= 2017 Taiwan blackout =

Blackout happened on August 15, 2017 in Taiwan

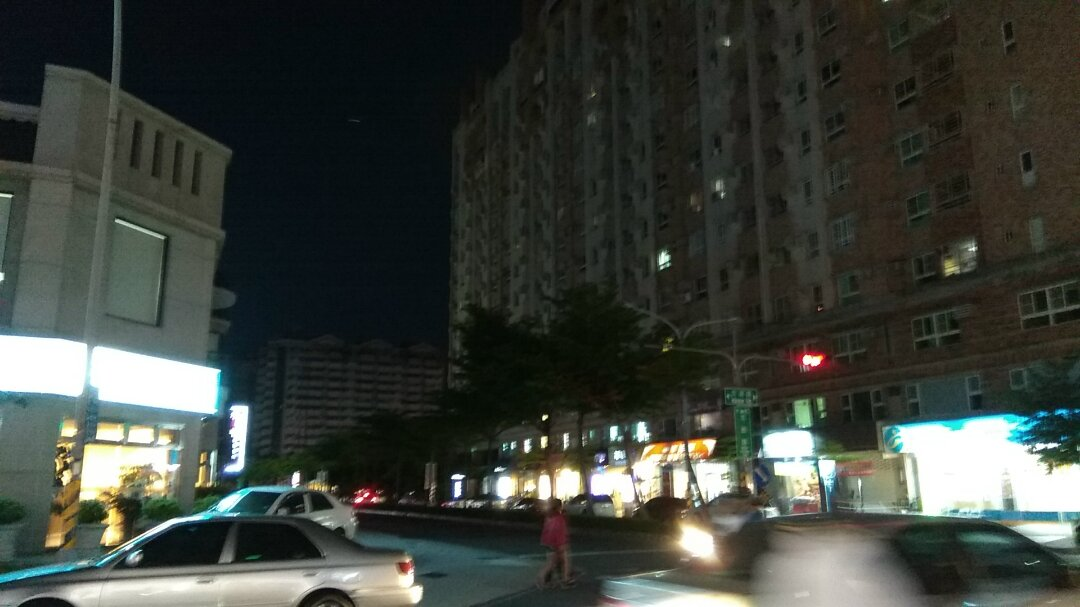
Blackout in Kaohsiung.

On 15 August 2017 at 4:52 p.m. NST, a massive blackout hit northern half of Taiwan, affecting 6.68 million households. Electricity rationing was implemented at 6:00 p.m. and the blackout fully ended at 9:40 p.m. The power outage is also known as the 815 blackout (815全台大停電).

== Event ==
=== Power plant ===
During the power supply equipment replacement for a control system of the metering station at Tatan Power Plant in Guanyin District, Taoyuan City by a contractor of CPC Corporation, the worker did not switch the system from auto mode to manual mode before starting the work, causing the two gas supply pipe valves to close and stop the supply of liquefied natural gas fuel source for two minutes. Six generators of the power plant fully tripped due to that, disrupting the supply of 4 GW of electricity.

=== Public ===
Residents in major cities in northern Taiwan reported slow-moving traffic, stalled lifts or gondolas, and no air conditioning. Some emergency services were called to rescue trapped people and the police were manually directing traffic. And before 2017 Summer Universiade.

== Reactions ==
Taipower responded by offering one day electricity charge cut from each household bill, which resulted in NT$270 million of revenue loss to the company.

President Tsai Ing-wen apologized to the people of Taiwan through her Facebook page, stating that electricity supply is a national security issue.

Economic Affairs Minister Lee Chih-kung resigned shortly afterwards to take responsibility. Premier Lin Chuan appointed Deputy Minister Shen Jong-chin as acting Minister to replace Lee.

CPC Corporation Chairperson Chen Chin-te resigned three days afterwards to take responsibility of the event which was then replaced by acting Chairperson Yang Wei-fuu. His resignation also was accepted by Premier Lin.

== Damages ==
The blackout caused at least NT$100 million (about US$3 million) of loss or damages to over 150 companies in industrial parks and export processing zones.

== Aftermaths ==
President Tsai promised that her administration would conduct a comprehensive review of the electrical grid of Taiwan to reexamine and strengthen it.

== See also ==
- Electricity sector in Taiwan
- List of major power outages
