= Cho Shih-chao =

Taiwanese politician

- 卓士昭
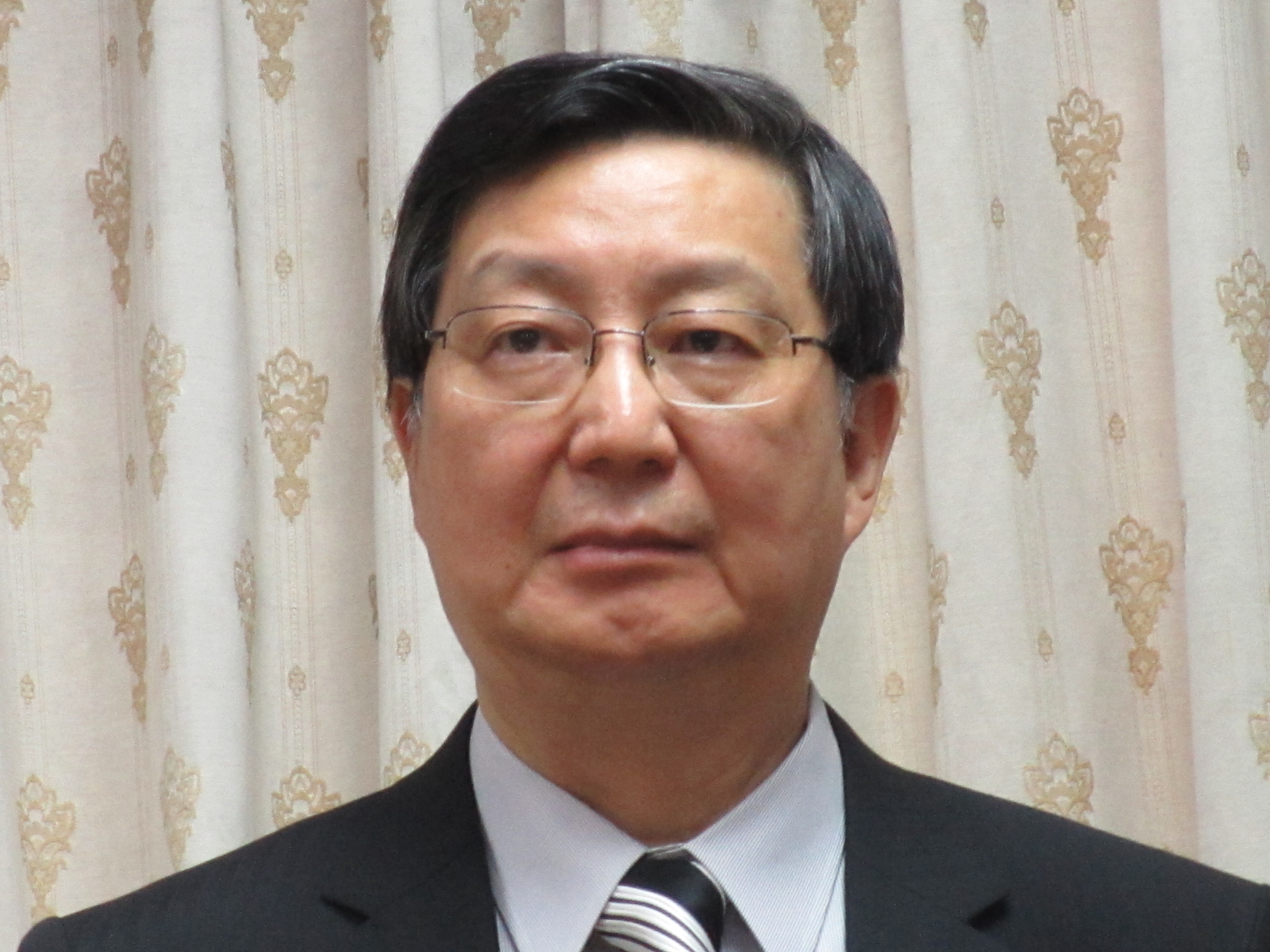

Deputy Minister of Economic Affairs of the Republic of China
- Incumbent
- Assumed office October 2014
- Minister: Woody Duh; John Deng
- Vice: Shen Jong-chin; Shen Jong-chin, Yang Wei-fuu
- Preceded by: Woody Duh; Vacant

Vice Minister of Economic Affairs of the Republic of China
- Incumbent
- Assumed office July 2012
- Minister: Shih Yen-shiang; Chang Chia-juch; Woody Duh
- Deputy: Francis Liang; Woody Duh; Vacant
- Vice: Woody Duh; Shen Jong-chin

ROC Representative to Kuwait
- In office 2008 – 17 October 2010

Personal details
- Born: 25 October 1951 (age 75)
- Education: University of Louisville (MBA)

Cho Shih-chao or Bill Cho (Chinese: 卓士昭; pinyin: Zhuó Shìzhāo; born 25 October 1951) is a Taiwanese politician, who has been the Deputy Minister of Economic Affairs (MOEA) of the Republic of China since October 2014.

== Education ==
Cho earned a Master of Business Administration (M.B.A.) degree from the University of Louisville in the United States.

== ROC Economic Affairs Vice Ministry ==
=== 2013 United States visit ===
In mid April 2013, Cho led Taiwanese delegations on a visit to Milpitas, California, United States for an investment and trade seminar. He and the delegations presented about Taiwan's investment environment, business opportunities in the manufacturing and service sector, investment environment in the Southern Taiwan Science Park and Taipei City and measures to promote bilateral trade between Taiwan and the United States.

He further stressed the signing of Economic Cooperation Framework Agreement between Taiwan and Mainland China in June 2010 is to increase the services and commodities trade between the two sides and to promote bilateral exchanges and cooperation in education and culture, which helps to make Taiwan a springboard to China.

=== Taiwan's Q1 2013 economic growth ===
Commenting on Taiwan's Q1 2013 lower-than-expected 1.54% economic growth at Legislative Yuan in end of April 2013, Cho said that since 70% of Taiwan's GDP is based on export, the MOEA will try to propose measures to boost the figure. He said that Taiwan still can achieve annual 3% GDP growth if the economy achieves its estimated growth rate for the remaining quarters of 2013. He said that the glow GDP growth figure was due to macroeconomic uncertainties in the global market which drags down Taiwan's export and lower domestic consumption.

=== Cross-strait service trade ===
In end of April 2013, Cho said that the Cross-Strait Service Trade Agreement had been concluded. Both sides will sign the agreement in near future, and hope that the consensus will become effective within the year 2013.

In end of June 2013, Cho joined a delegation led by Lin Join-sane, Chairman of Straits Exchange Foundation (SEF), to visit Shanghai from Taiwan for the cross-strait service trade agreement signing. The Taiwanese delegation includes Kao Koong-lian, SEF Vice Chairman and Secretary-General and Chang Hsien-yao, Deputy Minister of Mainland Affairs Council.

The cross-strait service trade agreement was signed on 21 June 2013 which consists of four chapters and twenty four articles. Under the agreement, 64 Taiwanese industries will be opened to mainland Chinese investments, ranging from transportation, tourism and traditional Chinese medicine sectors. Meanwhile, 80 mainland Chinese industries will be opened to Taiwanese investments, ranging from finance, retail, electronics, publishing and travel sectors.
