= Hwang Wang-hsiang =

Taiwanese economist

- 黃萬翔

Deputy Minister of National Development Council of the Republic of China
- In office 22 January 2014 – 2016
- Minister: Kuan Chung-ming; Duh Tyzz-jiun; Lin Chu-chia
- Preceded by: Position established

Deputy Minister of Council for Economic Planning and Development of the Republic of China
- In office 2008 – 21 January 2014
- Minister: Chen Tain-jy; Christina Liu; Yiin Chii-ming; Kuan Chung-ming
- Succeeded by: Position abolished

Personal details
- Education: National Cheng Kung University (BS); Chinese Culture University (MS); National Chengchi University (PhD)

Hwang Wang-hsiang (Chinese: 黃萬翔; pinyin: Huáng Wànxiáng) is a Taiwanese economist. He was a Deputy Minister of the Council for Economic Planning and Development during the Ma Ying-jeou administration and, after that council's merger into the National Development Council of the Executive Yuan on 22 January 2014, a Deputy Minister of the new council.

== Education ==
Hwang obtained his master's degree in architecture and urban planning from Chinese Culture University in 1984 and doctoral degree in land economics from National Chengchi University in 1994.

== Career ==
Hwang became a Deputy Minister of the Council for Economic Planning and Development after Ma Ying-jeou took office in 2008, and remained in the post through the council's frequent changes of minister. In July 2013 he was criticized for having council staff help deliver wedding invitations for his son's wedding to legislators' offices; he acknowledged that this was inappropriate and said he would ask staff to stop.

When the National Development Council was established on 22 January 2014, Hwang became one of its Deputy Ministers. He served under ministers Kuan Chung-ming, Duh Tyzz-jiun and Lin Chu-chia, and was still a deputy minister in the first half of 2016.

== See also ==
- National Development Council (Republic of China)
