= Industrial Development Administration =

Republic of China government agency

Coordinates: 25.033762°N 121.535361°E

- 經濟部產業發展署
- Logo of the Industrial Development Administration

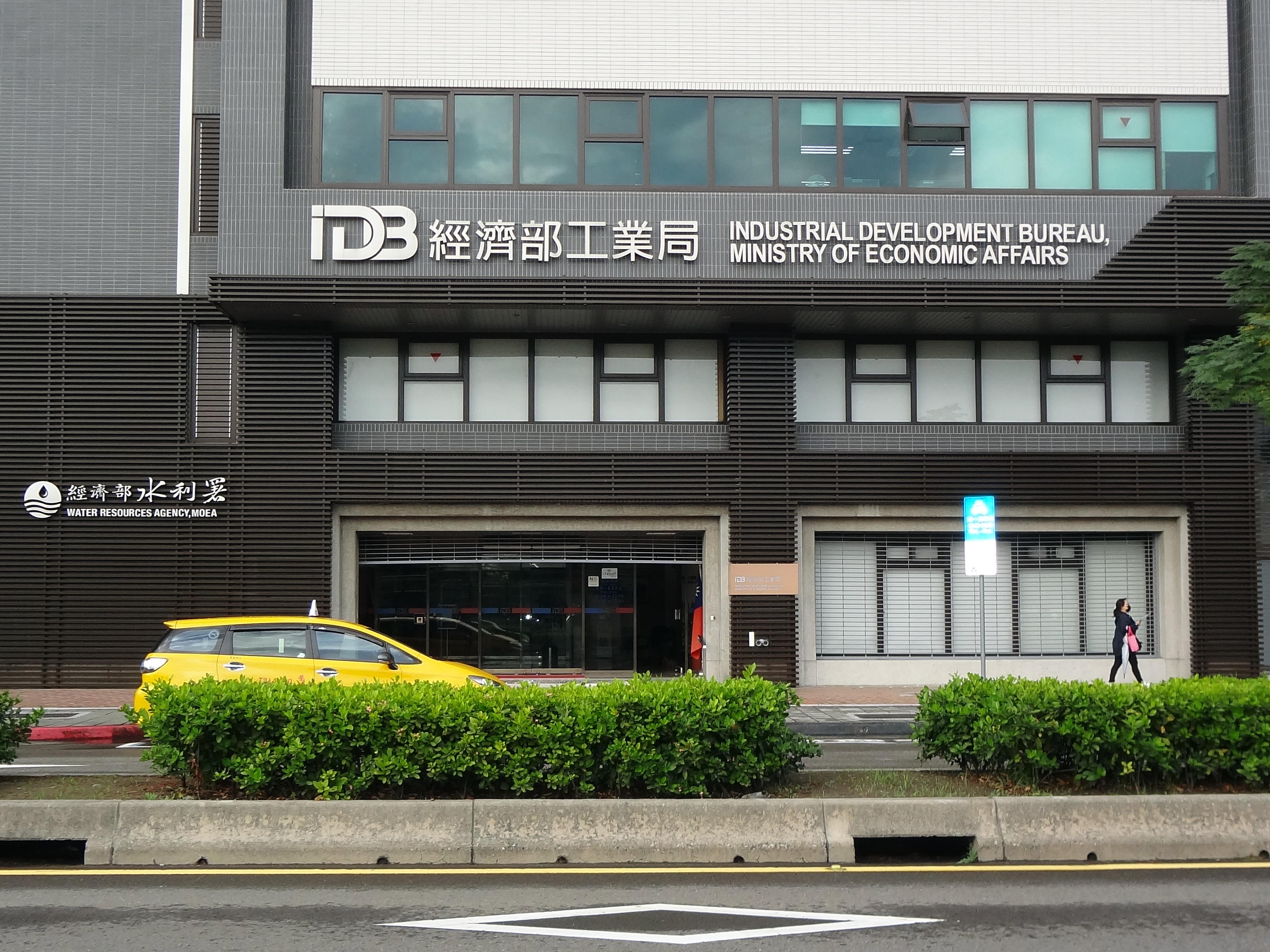
- Headquarters of the Industrial Development Administration

Agency overview
- Preceding agency: Industrial Development Bureau
- Headquarters: Da'an, Taipei, Taiwan
- Agency executives: Lien Ching-Chang, Director-General; Yang Chih-ching, Chen Pei-Li, Deputy Director-Generals
- Parent agency: Ministry of Economic Affairs
- Website: Official website

The Industrial Development Administration, MOEA (IDA; Chinese: 經濟部產業發展署) is the administrative agency of the Ministry of Economic Affairs of Republic of China. The economy of Taiwan has achieved Industrialized Economy (IE) status (which includes economies with adjusted manufacturing value added (MVA) per capita higher than $2,500 (PPP international dollars) or a gross domestic product per capita higher than $20,000 (international PPP)) as defined by UNIDO, and Taiwan is included in the UNIDO's Competitive Industrial Performance Index (CIP) and ranked 8th overall in UNIDO's Industrial Development Report among global economies in 2022.

== History ==
The agency was originally established as Industrial Development Bureau. It was renamed the Industrial Development Administration in 2023.

== Organizational structure ==
- Industrial Policy Division
- Metal and Mechanical Industries Division
- Information Technology Industries Division
- Consumer Goods and Chemical Industries Division
- Knowledge Services Division
- Sustainable Development Division
- Industrial Parks Division
- ICP Office

== Branch offices ==
- Central Region Office
- Southern Region Office

== Directors-General ==
- Soong Tieh-min
- Wei Yung-ning
- Hsu Kuo-an
- Yang Shih-chien
- Wang Chueh-ming
- Yiin Chii-ming
- Wang Ya-kang
- Shih Yen-shiang
- Chen Chao-yih
- Woody Duh
- Shen Jong-chin (June 2012–February 2014)
- Wu Ming-ji
- Leu Jang-hwa (August 2017–August 2022)
- Lien Ching-Chang (August 2022–)

== Transportation ==
The agency is accessible within walking distance East from Dongmen Station of Taipei Metro.
