= 智輝 =

智輝, meaning "intellect, sparkle", is an Asian given name.

It may refer to:

- J.W. Kuo (郭智輝; born 1953), Taiwanese business executive and politician
- Ho Chih-hui (何智輝; born 1950), county magistrate of Miaoli, Taiwan (1993-1997)
- Lok Chi-fai (駱智輝), fictional character in Hong Kong-Chinese film Raging Fire
- Michiteru Mita (三田 智輝; born 1975), Japanese former footballer and manager
- Tomoki, Japanese masculine given name
