= Tseng Wen-sheng =

Taiwanese politician (born 1969)

- 曾文生
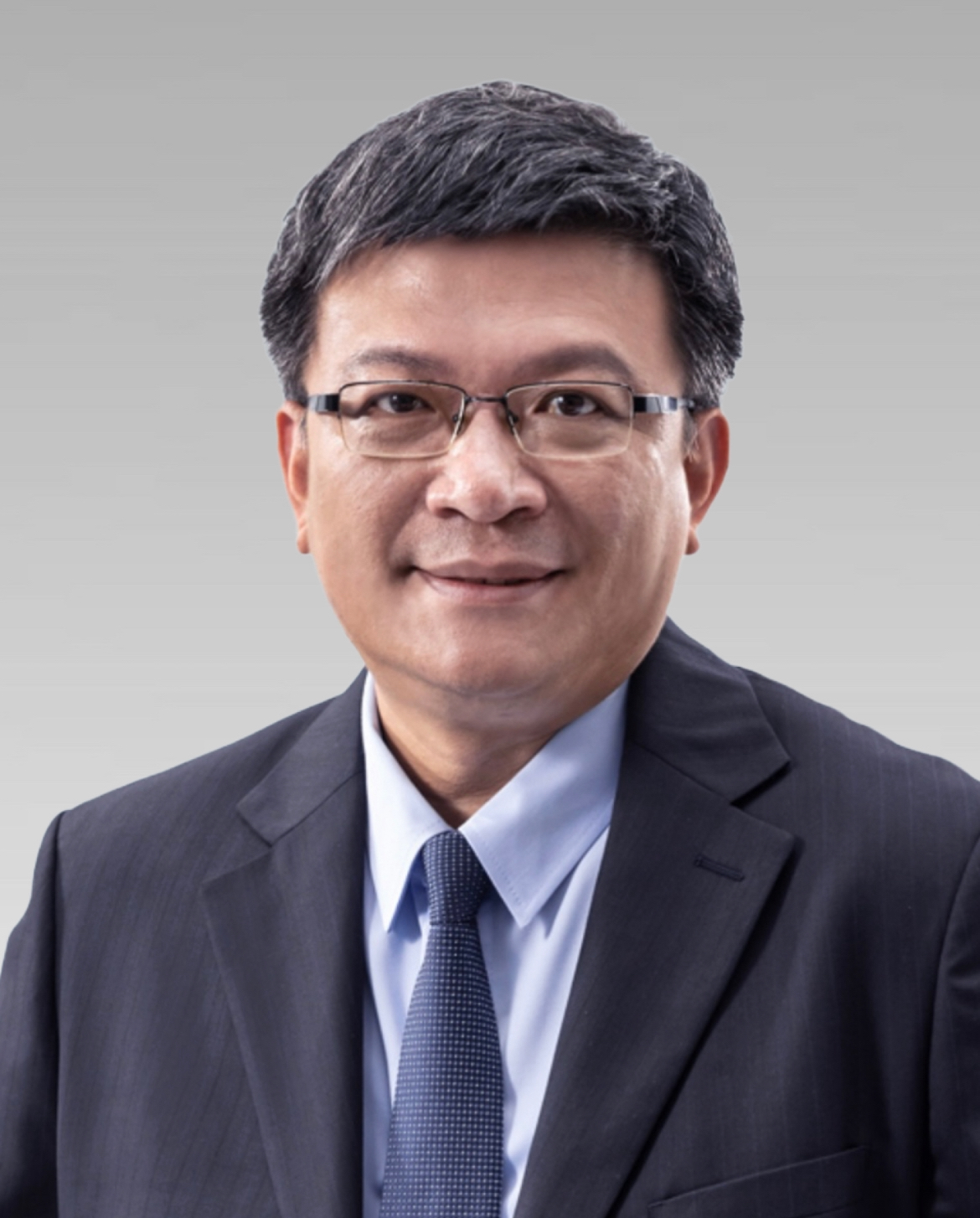
- Official portrait, 2022

20th Chairman of the Taiwan Power Company
- Incumbent
- Assumed office 8 March 2022
- Preceded by: Yang Wei-fuu

Deputy Minister of Economic Affairs
- In office 10 April 2018 – 20 May 2024 Serving with C.C. Chen
- Minister: Shen Jong-chin; Wang Mei-hua

Personal details
- Born: 20 October 1969 (age 57) Taoyuan, Taiwan
- Parent: Tseng Mao-hsing (father)
- Education: National Taiwan University (BS)

Tseng Wen-sheng (Chinese: 曾文生; born 20 October 1969), also known by his English name Vincent Tseng, is a Taiwanese politician who has served as the chairman of Taiwan Power Company since 2022. He was the deputy minister of Ministry of Economic Affairs from 2018 to 2024.

== Early life and education ==
Tseng Wen-sheng was born on 20 October 1969. His father Tseng Mao-hsing was active in the labor movement in Taiwan, and died in 2007.

Tseng was raised in Taoyuan and attended Taipei Municipal Jianguo High School. He then graduated from National Taiwan University with a Bachelor of Science (B.S.) in civil engineering.

== Political career ==
Tseng was a senior executive officer of the National Youth Commission from May 2004 to February 2005, when he was named leader of the Democratic Progressive Party's Department of Youth Development. He remained in that role through September 2006, and returned to the National Youth Commission as a researcher in January 2007. In September 2008, he began working for the Kaohsiung City Government Urban Development Bureau. Tseng then became an adviser to the city government before taking a senior executive position within its Economic Development Bureau in December 2010. He also headed the office of the mayor, Chen Chu. In March 2013, Tseng was appointed director-general of the municipal Economic Development Bureau. During his tenure the 2014 Kaohsiung gas explosions occurred, and he commented on the economic impact of the blasts, as well as municipal ordinances considered in their aftermath. Tseng also attended a number of domestic and international economic forums.

=== Ministry of Economic Affairs ===
Tseng was named deputy minister of economic affairs in April 2018. From this position, Tseng frequently commented on the actions of state-owned companies CPC Corporation, Taiwan and Taiwan Power Company, and feed-in tariffs for renewable energy, as well as specific renewable energy initiatives. Prior to the 2018 Taiwanese referendum, which included a question about reducing reliance on nuclear power, Tseng took part in a televised debate on nuclear power in Taiwan. Referendum results supported a slow annual reduction in production from thermal power plants, but opposed the governmental plan to phase out nuclear power by 2025. He took part in another debate about nuclear power before the 2021 Taiwanese referendum was held.
