= Wu Ming-ji =

Taiwanese management scientist

- 吳明機
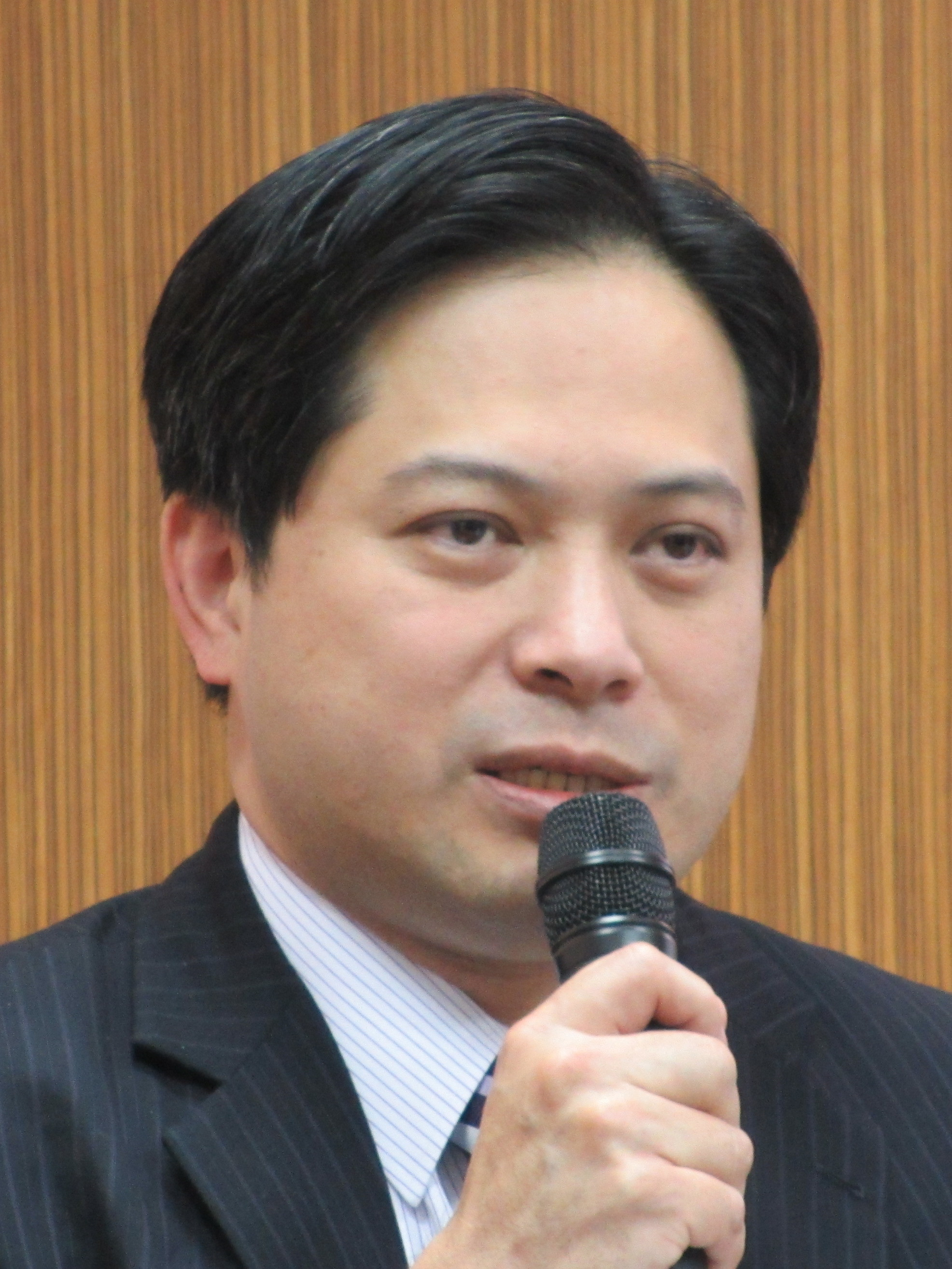

Deputy Minister of Council for Economic Planning and Development of the Republic of China
- In office 20 May 2012 – 2013
- Minister: Kuan Chung-ming
- Succeeded by: Chen Chien-liang

Personal details
- Education: National Taipei Institute of Technology (BS); University of Southern California (MBA); National Chengchi University (PhD)

Wu Ming-ji or Wu Ming-chi (traditional Chinese: 吳明機; simplified Chinese: 吴明机; pinyin: Wú Míngjī) is a Taiwanese management scientist. He was the Deputy Minister of the Council for Economic Planning and Development (CEPD) of the Executive Yuan in 2012–2013.

== Education ==
Wu graduated from National Taipei University of Technology with a bachelor's degree in electrical engineering and earned a Master of Business Administration (M.B.A.) from the University of Southern California in the United States. He then earned his Ph.D. in technology management and innovation management from National Chengchi University in 2008. His doctoral dissertation was titled, "Economies of platform innovation theory through knowledge modularization and reuse: The cases of software components and silicon intellectual properties (SIPs)".

== Political career ==
Prior to his appointment as the CEPD deputy ministry, Wu was the Director-General of the Department of Industrial Technology of the Ministry of Economic Affairs.

He is currently also the Director-General of Industrial Development Bureau of the Ministry of Economic Affairs.

== See also ==
- Council for Economic Planning and Development
