= Steven Chen =

Steven or Steve Chen, may refer to:

- Steve Chen (born 1978), Taiwanese-born American Internet entrepreneur
- Steven Chen (musician), member of The Airborne Toxic Event
- Chen Shyh-kwei or Steven Chen (born 1952), Taiwanese politician, Governor of Fujian Province of the Republic of China in 2013
- Steve Chen (computer engineer) (born 1944), Taiwanese computer engineer
- Steve Chen (politician) (born 1948), Taiwanese politician, Minister of Economic Affairs from 2006 to 2008
- Stephen S. F. Chen (born 1934), Taiwanese diplomat
