= 2022 National Taiwan University dormitory counselor sexual harassment case =

In 2022, a dormitory counselor at National Taiwan University (NTU) was accused of sexually harassing a resident student. During the handling of the case, NTU's Gender Equity Education Committee concluded that sexual harassment had not occurred. However, the Taipei High Administrative Court later ruled that the committee had been improperly constituted and revoked its decision. The Control Yuan censured NTU over numerous deficiencies in its handling of the case, while the Ministry of Education repeatedly ordered the university to reopen the investigation. Additional controversies arose over the disclosure of the victim's personal information. In March 2026, the dormitory counselor was sentenced to seven months' imprisonment for violating the Stalking and Harassment Prevention Act.

== Case ==
During Taiwan's #MeToo movement in June 2023, a married female dormitory counselor at NTU was accused of abusing her authority and position to repeatedly sexually harass a female doctoral student residing in the dormitory beginning in June 2022. The alleged acts included using a duplicate key to enter the student's room, secret photography and touching the student while she was asleep, rubbing against her body, and appearing outside her room late at night demanding to meet her. Unable to endure the harassment, the student sought assistance from the university in late September but was unsuccessful. On 31 October, she turned to the police, applied for a warning order under the Stalking and Harassment Prevention Act, and filed a complaint.

== Gender equity investigation ==
NTU reported the case to the Domestic Violence and Sexual Assault Prevention Center on 4 November. During the Gender Equity Education Committee proceedings, the dormitory counselor repeatedly claimed that she had merely been attempting to show concern for the student. Members of the committee concluded that audio recordings submitted by the student had been fabricated and even questioned whether the student resembled a victim. Ultimately, the committee determined that sexual harassment had not occurred, and the student's appeal was rejected by NTU.

In November 2024, the victim filed an Administrative Litigation Act（Taiwan） challenging the Gender Equity Education Committee's findings and simultaneously requested a reinvestigation. In March 2025, NTU convened a Student Appeals Review Committee meeting, during which the victim alleged that she was closely watched throughout the proceedings by two physically imposing university staff members, making her feel extremely uncomfortable. The Ministry of Education ordered NTU to reopen the investigation, but the university refused, arguing that it employed "dormitory counselors" rather than " housemaster".

In October 2025, the Taipei High Administrative Court ruled that the Gender Equity Education Committee had been improperly constituted and annulled its decision. NTU appealed the ruling. In December of the same year, the Ministry of Education's Gender Equity Education Committee resolved that NTU should conduct a new investigation. After NTU failed to do so, the Ministry's committee ruled again in March 2026 that the university must immediately reopen the case in accordance with the Gender Equity Education Act.

== Control Yuan investigation ==
Following its investigation, the Control Yuan concluded that NTU had become aware of the incident in September 2022 and had made a campus safety report, yet the dormitory counselor continued to harass the student in October. The university had failed to respond promptly and protect the student, thereby exposing her to safety risks. The Control Yuan also found that NTU had failed to establish appropriate codes of conduct and training for dormitory counselors. In July 2024, it adopted an investigation report formally censuring NTU. In January 2025, the Control Yuan returned NTU's review report and requested revisions.

== Criminal proceedings ==
After investigating the case, the Taipei District Prosecutors Office determined that the dormitory counselor had violated the Stalking and Harassment Prevention Act and committed coercion, and filed charges in May 2024. In March 2026, the Taiwan Taipei District Court sentenced the counselor to seven months' imprisonment for stalking and harassment, without the option of paying a fine in lieu of imprisonment.

== Personal information leaks ==
Several incidents involving the disclosure of Personal data occurred during the case.

For example:

- NTU president Chen Wen-chang, who served as chair of the Gender Equity Education Committee, violated confidentiality requirements by revealing the student's identity and telephoning her academic advisor, asking the advisor to "take better care" of the student and prevent the matter from escalating.
- Ping-Cheng Yeh, an NTU professor and then Political Deputy Minister of Education, disclosed the victim's personal information in April 2025. In December of the same year, the Taipei City Department of Social Welfare fined him NT$50,000 for violating the Sexual Assault Crime Prevention Act. In another incident, an NTU student disclosed the victim's personal information in March 2026 and was subsequently fined by the Taipei City Department of Social Welfare in May for violating the same law.
- Staff members of the Ministry of Education mistakenly assumed that members of the public who had contacted the ministerial mailbox belonged to a group and sent a reply using the carbon copy function, resulting in the disclosure of the personal information of eighteen individuals.
