= Hou Ho-shong =

Taiwanese engineer and politician

Hou Ho-shong (Chinese: 侯和雄; born 1944) is a Taiwanese engineer and politician.

== Career ==
Hou completed a master's degree in civil engineering at National Cheng Kung University and pursued a doctorate in civil and oceanographic engineering at the University of Florida. His dissertation, The Influence of Equivalent Sand Roughness on the Dispersion Coefficient in Laboratory and Natural Watercourses, was completed in 1976. Hou taught at the National Taiwan College of Marine Science and Technology, as well as National Taiwan University in an adjunct capacity. He joined the Kuomintang, and worked successively for the Taiwan Provincial Government, where he was affiliated with the Institute of Harbor and Marine Technology, the Ministry of Transportation and Communications, where he became head of the Transportation Engineering Department, and Kaohsiung City Government, serving as deputy mayor under Frank Hsieh. While serving as deputy mayor of Kaohsiung, Hou was an adjunct professor at National Sun Yat-Sen University. Following Hsieh's reelection as mayor, Hou became a presidential adviser and was replaced as deputy mayor by Yao Kao-chiao. Hou was named vice minister of economic affairs in August 2005, succeeding Yiin Chii-ming. Hou took office the next month. In October 2007, legislator Sun Ta-chien alleged that Hou and Chen Che-nan suggested that work on 29 missile boats worth NT$15 billion for the Ministry of National Defense be shared between China Shipbuilding Corporation (CSBC) and Jong Shyn Shipbuilding Company, despite the fact that CSBC had won the bid and reached an agreement with the defense ministry on 24 June 2007. In August 2007, the Nantou District Court detained Hou on charges of influence peddling and bribery, suspecting him of involvement in seven flood control-related construction projects. Economic affairs minister Steve Chen suspended Hou from his duties on 8 August 2007. On 29 November 2007, Hou was indicted on corruption charges by the Nantou Prosecutors' Office. Hou retired from public service on 22 June 2009, before the Control Yuan voted 10–2 on 30 July 2009 to impeach him. The Supreme Court convicted him of corruption in April 2013. He was released on parole in 2015. Hou returned to teaching, at National Sun Yat-sen University, Feng Chia University, National Taitung University.
