= Chen Hsiao-hung =

Taiwanese economist

- 陳小紅

Deputy Minister of the Council for Economic Planning and Development of the Republic of China
- In office 17 September 2012 – 21 January 2014
- Minister: Yiin Chii-ming; Kuan Chung-ming
- Succeeded by: Position abolished

Personal details
- Education: Chinese Culture University (BA); University of Missouri (MA); University of Pittsburgh (PhD)

Chen Hsiao-hung (traditional Chinese: 陳小紅; simplified Chinese: 陈小红; pinyin: Chén Xiǎohóng), also known by her English name Nancy Chen, is a Taiwanese economist. She was the Deputy Minister of the Council for Economic Planning and Development of the Executive Yuan until 21 January 2014.

== Education ==
After graduating from Chinese Culture University, Chen pursued graduate studies in the United States, where she earned a Master of Science (M.S.) in regional and community development from the University of Missouri and her Ph.D. in economics and social development from the University of Pittsburgh in 1977. Her doctoral dissertation was titled, "The elusiveness of administrative reform strategies for national development: a comparative view".

Upon receiving her doctorate, she completed postdoctoral research in urban and regional development as a researcher at the Massachusetts Institute of Technology (MIT).

== Political careers ==
Chen was the Deputy Minister of the Council for Economic Planning and Development from 17 September 2012 until 21 January 2014 and senior advisor to the President from 10 February until 31 July 2014.
