= Lee Chih-Kung =

Taiwanese applied physicist and engineer

- 李世光
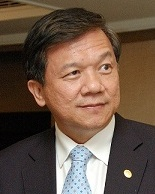
- Lee in 2010

Minister of Economic Affairs of the Republic of China
- In office 20 May 2016 – 15 August 2017
- Deputy: Shen Jong-chin
- Vice: Yang Wei-fuu; Wang Mei-hua, Yang Wei-fuu
- Preceded by: John Deng
- Succeeded by: Shen Jong-chin

Personal details
- Born: October 1959 (age 66)
- Education: National Taiwan University (BS); Cornell University (MS, PhD)
- Scientific career
- Fields: Applied mechanics Applied physics
- Thesis: Piezoelectric laminates for torsional and bending modal control: theory and experiment (1987)
- Doctoral advisor: Francis C. Moon

Lee Chih-Kung (C.K. Lee; Chinese: 李世光; pinyin: Lǐ Shìguāng; born October 1959) is a Taiwanese applied physicist and engineer. He is a distinguished professor of electronics engineering at National Taiwan University.

== Early life and education ==
Lee was born in Taipei, Taiwan, and has three brothers: Howard, Adam, and Ben. His parents were Lee Wen-hsiung and Lee Shu-lien.

After high school, Lee graduated from National Taiwan University with a Bachelor of Science (B.S.) in civil engineering in 1981. As an undergraduate, he won two engineering contests for papers on the fire protection of high-rise buildings and the analysis of dams.

After completing two years of military service in the Republic of China Air Force, Lee pursued graduate studies in the United States on a fellowship at Cornell University, where he earned a Master of Science (M.S.) in 1984 under Yih-Hsing Pao and his Ph.D. in theoretical mechanics, applied mechanics, and applied physics in 1987. As a doctoral student at Cornell, he developed piezoelectric modal sensors and actuators. His dissertation, completed under Francis C. Moon, was titled, "Piezoelectric laminates for torsional and bending modal control: theory and experiment".

== Career ==
In 1987, Lee joined IBM's Almaden Research Center in San Jose, California, as a research staff member and later as a staff to the IBM ARC Laboratory Director. His research work at IBM was primarily on the interdisciplinary areas related to magnetic disk drives, optoelectronic systems, metrology systems and piezoelectric systems. He was awarded an IBM Outstanding Technical Achievement Award for his work on reducing the thermal track mis-registration of the 3.5 inch, 320 MB, IBM 0661 hard disk file, a highly profitable commercial product at that time. He received two distinguished Invention Awards for his inventions and patents on laser encoders, nanometer fly height measurement systems, piezoelectric strain rate gages, and acceleration rate sensors for early shock arrival.

== Research interests ==
In 1994, he joined the faculty of National Taiwan University’s Institute of Applied Mechanics where he co-founded the Nano-Bio-MEMS research group. He is a well-recognized expert in the areas of flexible structure control, shock sensing, and sensor development due to his research work on distributed piezoelectric sensors and actuators. He has directed many research projects in the areas of ultra-high performance laser Doppler interferometers, laser encoders, sphere ellipsometry analyzers, curved distributed piezoelectric sensors/actuators, dot matrix writers, diffractive optical elements/systems, and laser writers. His specialty lies in systems integration which combines mechanics, optics, electronics, semiconductors, mechanisms, metrology, and interface systems to create new innovative systems. He has many research papers in various fields and has over 110 patents, including various technology transfers to industry. He has teamed up with other departments and research teams at other Universities, to focus on topics in medical care, chemical research, electronic engineering and biotechnology. Some results of their research efforts include the Sparkle holographic mastering system, AVID interferometer/vibrometer, an ellipsometer, an ultrasonic sensor with anisotropic beam pattern, SARS No. 1 antivirus compound, a flexible electret speaker, etc., all of which have been technology transferred to industry. The AVID interferometer/vibrometer won Photonic Spectra's Circle of Excellence Award in 1998 for one of the top 25 optoelectronic systems worldwide, the first time a Taiwan company won the award.

== Specialties ==
Optoelectronic and Piezoelectric Systems, MEMS & Nano-Systems, Optoelectronic Systems Design, Precision Metrology, Automation Technology, Biochip Systems, Technology Management.

== Careers ==
- Chairman, Industrial Technology Research Institute, Taiwan (2017/10~)
- Distinguished Professor, Graduate Institute of Electronics Engineering, National Taiwan University (2016/08~)
- Distinguished Professor, Institute of Applied Mechanics, National Taiwan University (2007/08~)
- Distinguished Professor, Department of Engineering Science and Ocean Engineering, National Taiwan University (2007/08~)
- Advisor, Ministry of Education, Taiwan (2002/01~2004/07, 2010/10~)
- Consultant, Taiwan Intellectual Property Training Academy (2007/01~)
- Taiwan Member of the Board, Pan Wen Yuan Foundation (2007/09~)
- President, Institute for Information Industry, Taiwan (2010/08~2012/09)
- Executive Vice-President, Industrial Technology Research Institute, Taiwan (2007/10~2010/07)
- Director General, Industrial Economics & Knowledge Center (IEK), Institute for Information Industry, Taiwan (2009/05~2009/10)
- Director General, Information and Communications Research Laboratories (ICL), Institute for Information Industry, Taiwan (2009/09~2009/12)
- Director General, Department of Engineering and Applied Science, National Science Council (2004/08~2007/07)
- Researcher, National Applied Research Laboratories, Taiwan (2004/03~2007/09)
- Managing Supervisor, Photonics Industry & Technology Development Association, Taiwan (2006/04~2007/07)
- Director, Biomedical Research and Development, Hsinchu Biomedical Science Park, National Taiwan University (2003/10~2006/08)
- Committee Member, Commission on Research and Development, National Taiwan University (2002/08~2005/07)
- Director, Division of Strategic Planning, Office of Research and Development, National Taiwan University (2002/02~2004/07)
- Program Director, MEMS & Nanotechnology Engineering Advancement Program, National Science Council, Taiwan Program Director MEMS Program, National Science Council, Taiwan (1999/03~2001/04)
- Director, NDT&M Lab, Tjing Ling Industrial Research Institute, National Taiwan University (1996/01~2000/12)
- IBM Almaden Research Center, San Jose, California, USA Research Staff Member 1987/06 to 1994/02

== Honors and awards ==
- Outstanding Research Award, National Science Council, Taiwan (1999–2005, 2010–2013)
- Fellow, Society of Theoretical & Applied Mechanics, Taiwan (November 2012)
- Gold Medal Prize, The 26th World Genius Convention (October 2012)
- Industry Contribution Award, SEMI Taiwan (2010, 2011, 2012)
- 2011 International Invention Hall of Fame and Lifetime Achievement Award, Taiwan International Invention Award Winners Association (November 2011)
- Chief Editor, International Journal of Automation and Smart Technology (Since March 2011)
- Fellow, Chinese Society for Management of Technology, Taiwan (November 2010)
- Fellow, Chinese Institute of Automation Engineers, Taiwan (January 2010)
- Optical Engineering Award, Taiwan Photonics Society (December 2009)
- Flexio, Red Dot Award: Design Concept (2009)
- FleXpeaker, The Wall Street Journal 2009 Technology Innovation Award: Consumer Electronics
- Excellent Project Award (ITRI Innovative Research Project), 2008 Taiwan Executive Yuan Supervised Project (May 2009)
- TECO Science & Technology Award, TECO Technology Foundation, Taiwan (November 2008)
- TWAS Prize in Engineering Sciences for 2007 (November 2007)
- Excellence Teaching Award, National Taiwan University (2007)
- Distinguished Professor, National Taiwan University (Since August 2007)
- Editorial Board, The Open Electrical and Electronic Engineering Journal, Bentham Science Publishers (Since March 2007)
- Fellow, the American Society of Mechanical Engineers (Since November 2006)
- Distinguished Teaching Award, National Taiwan University (2002)
- Outstanding Alumni Award, Dept. of Civil Engineering, College of Engineering, National Taiwan University (2002).
- First Y.Z. Hsu Scientific Chair Professor (Nano Science Category), Far Eastern Y.Z. Hsu Science and Technology Memorial Foundation (2002).
- Fellow, Institute of Physics (FInstP) (December 2001)
- Editorial Board, Journal of Smart Materials & Structures, Institute of Physics (Since 2001)
- 1st Prize, Gold Medal Dragon Thesis Award, Acer Foundation (1999 & 2000)
- Excellent Photonic Product Award, Photonics Industry & Technology Development Association & Industrial Development Bureau, Ministry of Economic Affairs, Taiwan (1998 & 2000)
- Technology Contribution Award, Optical Engineering Society of the Republic of China (ROCOES) (1997 & 1999)
- Outstanding Engineering Professor Award, Chinese Institute of Engineers (1998)
- Taiwan Excellent Product Award, Ministry of Economic Affairs, Taiwan (1998)
- 1998 Circle of Excellence Award, Photonics Spectra, USA (award for AVID, an advanced vibrometer/ interferometer device which was technology transferred to AHEAD Optoelectronics, Inc.)
- Award for Significant Contribution to Industry, Ministry of Education, Taiwan (1996, 1998)
- IBM Invention Achievement Award (1994)
- IBM Outstanding Technical Achievement Award (February 1991)
- IBM Research Division Annual Accomplishment List (1990)
- IBM Almaden Research Center Annual Accomplishment List (1989)
- Jefferson Goblet Award, AIAA (American Institute of Aeronautics and Astronautics) (April 1987)
- Taiwan Air Force General Command Award (highest honor for reserve officer) (1983)
