= Schive Chi =

Taiwanese politician (born 1947)

Hsueh Chi
- 薛琦
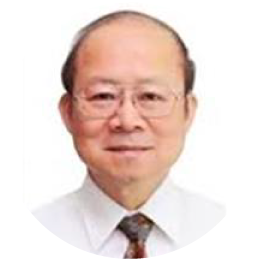

Governor of Fujian Province
- In office 30 September 2013 – 11 March 2014
- Preceded by: Luo Ying-shay
- Succeeded by: John Deng

Minister without Portfolio
- In office February 2013 – 2 March 2014
- Succeeded by: John Deng

Deputy Minister of Council for Economic Planning and Development of the Executive Yuan
- In office 1993–2000
- Minister: Vincent Siew; Hsu Li-teh; Chiang Pin-kung

Personal details
- Born: 28 June 1947 (age 78)
- Education: National Taiwan University (BA, MA); Case Western Reserve University (MA, PhD)

Hsueh Chi (Chinese: 薛琦; pinyin: Xuē Qí; born 28 June 1947), known also by his English name Schive Chi, is a Taiwanese economist and politician. He was the Governor of Fujian Province from 30 September 2013 to 11 March 2014.

== Education ==
Chi graduated with his bachelor's degree and master's degree in economics from National Taiwan University in 1969 and 1972, respectively. He then completed doctoral studies in the United States, earning a Master of Arts (M.A.) and his Ph.D. in economics from Case Western Reserve University in 1978. His doctoral dissertation, completed under economics professor Asam Adirlek, was titled, "Direct foreign investment, technology transfer and linkage effects: A case study of Taiwan".

== Early career ==
Chi was the chairman of the Taiwan Stock Exchange before being named a minister. He had previously led the Council of Economic Planning and Development, Taiwan Academy of Banking and Finance, and the Department of Economics at the National Taiwan University.
