= Yang Shih-chien =

Taiwanese politician

Yang Shih-chien (Chinese: 楊世緘; born c. 1944) is a Taiwanese politician.

== Education ==
Yang earned a masters of electrical engineering and a doctorate from Northwestern University.

== Career ==
Yang is a member of the Kuomintang. He was director-general of the Industrial Development Bureau prior to serving as political deputy minister of economic affairs from 1992 through 1994. Yang then led the Hsinchu Science Park Administration. In 1996, Yang was named a minister without portfolio. Following his retirement from politics in 2000, Yang founded the Global Strategic Investment Fund in March 2001. The Taiwan Solidarity Union suspected Yang of working in China, and disclosed the allegations in 2002. Subsequently, Yang's Global Strategic Investment Fund was fined by the Ministry of Economic Affairs. In 2010, Yang became the chairman of the China Prosper Investment and Management Company, based in Tianjin. Yang later served as national policy adviser to President Ma Ying-jeou.

== Personal life ==
Yang is a nephew of Rong Yiren, who served as vice president of the People's Republic of China from 1993 to 1998.
