= Steve Chen (politician) =

Taiwanese politician

- 陳瑞隆
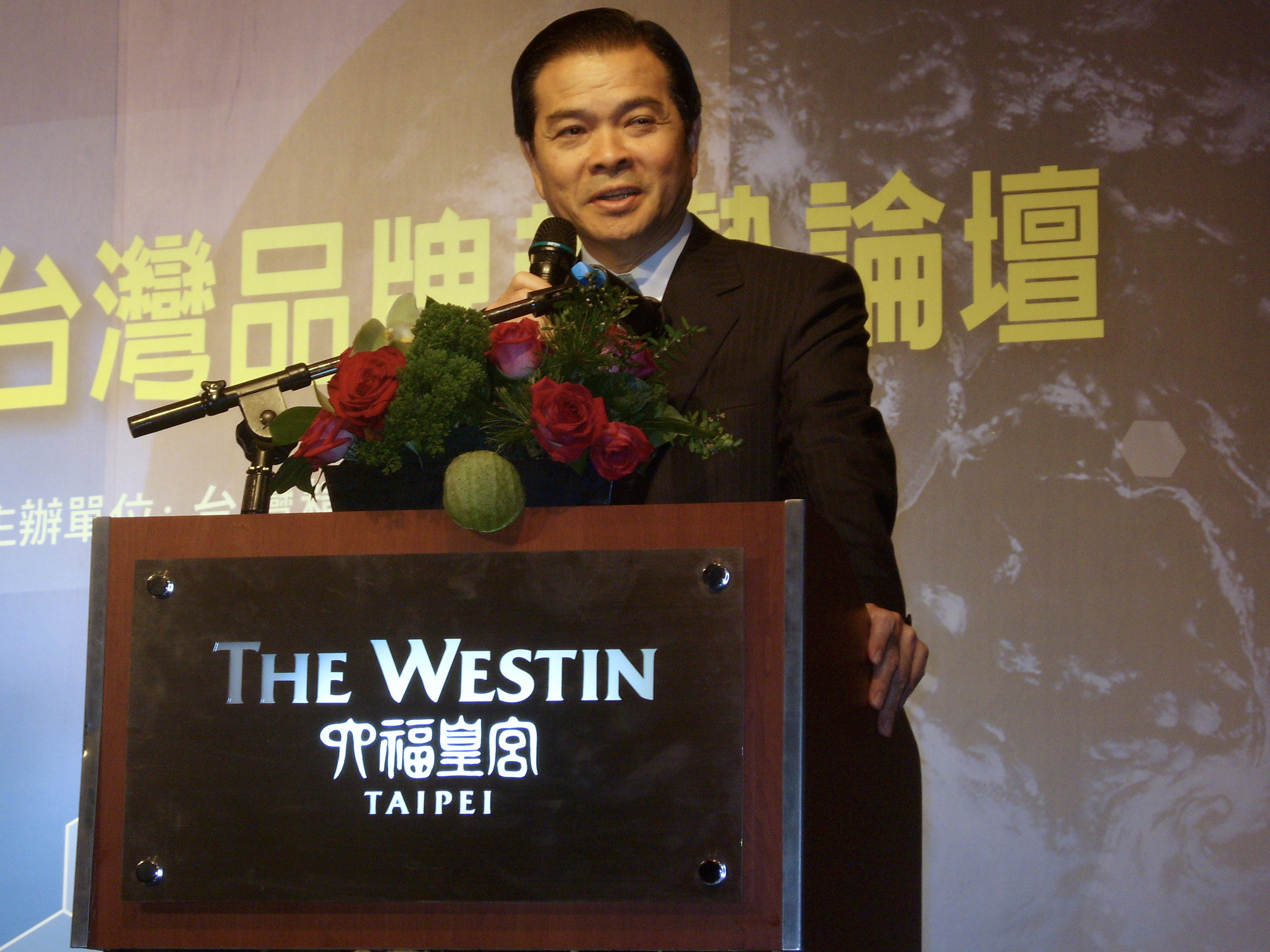
- Chen in 2007

Minister of Economic Affairs of the Republic of China
- In office 9 August 2006 – 20 May 2008
- Deputy: Shih Yen-shiang; Hou Ho-shong; Hsieh Fa-dah
- Preceded by: Morgan Hwang
- Succeeded by: Yiin Chii-ming

Personal details
- Born: 15 June 1948 (age 77) Chiayi, Taiwan
- Education: National Chung Hsing University (BA)

Chen Ruey-long (Chinese: 陳瑞隆; pinyin: Chén Ruìlóng; born 15 June 1948) is a Taiwanese politician.

== Career ==
Chen began his career at the Minister of Economic Affairs in 1973, with the Bureau of Foreign Trade upon graduation from National Chung Hsing University, where he had studied economics. As a deputy minister of economic affairs, Chen explored free trade agreements with Paraguay and the United States. He led negotiations with Nicaragua, which began in 2004 and continued until signing of an FTA in June 2006. Chen was named Minister of Economic Affairs in August 2006, and aided by deputy ministers Shih Yen-shiang, Hou Ho-shong, and Hsieh Fa-dah. Chen took office on 9 August and shortly thereafter commented on Cross-Strait economic ties, stating that moving manufacturing lines to China and other countries was not a bad thing, as long as research, development and design were based in Taiwan. As head of the Ministry of Economic Affairs, Chen continued to sign free trade agreements with Guatemala, El Salvador, and Honduras.

Chen left the Ministry of Economic Affairs in 2008, and was succeeded by Yiin Chii-ming. Chen assumed the chairmanship of Powerchip Technology Corporation in 2012, after company founder Frank Huang resigned. Chen visited the United States in 2015 to solicit American support for Taiwanese participation in the Trans-Pacific Partnership. By 2016, Chen had become the secretary-general of Cross-Strait CEO Summit Taiwan.
