= Hsieh Fa-dah =

Diplomat from Taiwan

- 謝發達
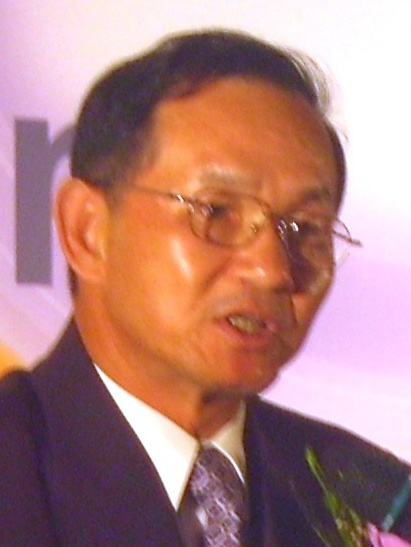

ROC Representative to Singapore
- In office May 2012 – 25 July 2015
- Preceded by: Vanessa Shih
- Succeeded by: Jacob Chang

ROC Representative to Switzerland
- In office September 2008 – April 2012
- Preceded by: George Liu

Vice Minister of Economic Affairs of the Republic of China
- In office August 2006 – September 2008
- Minister: Steve Chen

Vice Minister of Council for Economic Planning and Development of the Republic of China
- In office February 2002 – August 2006
- Minister: Lin Hsin-i; Hu Sheng-cheng

Secretary-General of Ministry of Economic Affairs of the Republic of China
- In office May 2000 – February 2002
- Minister: Lin Hsin-i

Personal details
- Born: 17 May 1950 (age 76) Taichung County, Taiwan
- Children: Thomas Hsieh, Nancy Hsieh
- Education: National Chengchi University (BA, MA)

Hsieh Fa-dah (Chinese: 謝發達; pinyin: Xiè Fādá; born 17 May 1950) is a Taiwanese government official and diplomat. He was the ROC representative to Singapore from 2012 to 2015.

== Education ==
Hsieh obtained his master's degree in economics from National Chengchi University in 1977.

== See also ==
- Ministry of Foreign Affairs (Republic of China)
