= Francis Liang =

Diplomat and politician from Taiwan

Liang Kuo-hsin
- 梁國新
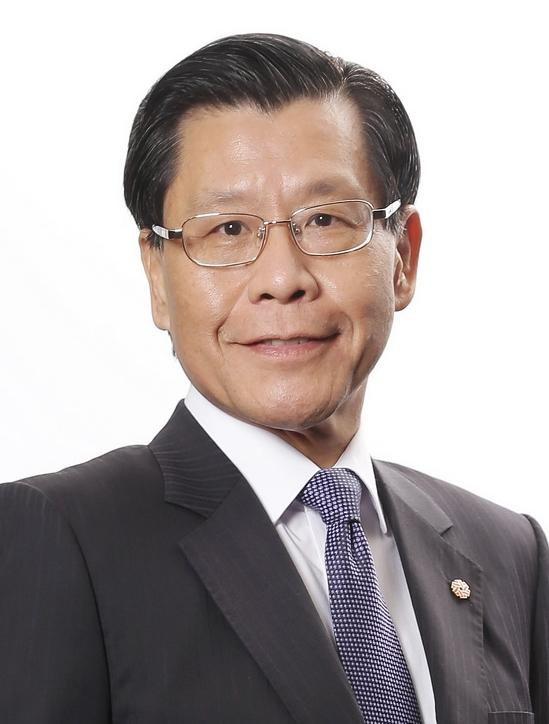

ROC Representative to Singapore
- In office December 2016 – 7 May 2023
- Preceded by: Antonio Chiang
- Succeeded by: Tung Chen-yuan

Deputy Minister of Economic Affairs of the Republic of China
- In office July 2012 – February 2014
- Minister: Chang Chia-juch
- Vice: Woody Duh, Cho Shih-chao
- Succeeded by: Woody Duh

Vice Minister of Economic Affairs of the Republic of China
- In office October 2009 – June 2012
- Minister: Shih Yen-shiang

Personal details
- Born: 17 December 1951 (age 74)
- Education: National Taiwan University (LLB, LLM); University of Miami (MBA)

Liang Kuo-hsin (Chinese: 梁國新; pinyin: Liáng Guóxīn; born 17 December 1951), also known by his English name Francis, is a Taiwanese retired diplomat and former politician. Prior to this, Liang served as Vice Minister and Deputy Minister of Economic Affairs (MOEA) in 2009–2014, and chairman of the Taiwan External Trade Development Council (TAITRA) from 2014 to 2016, and the Representative of Taipei Representative Office in Singapore from 2016-2023.

== Early life and education ==
Liang was born on December 17, 1951. After high school, he attended law school at National Taiwan University and graduated with a Bachelor of Laws (LL.B.) and a Master of Laws (LL.M.). He then earned a Master of Business Administration (M.B.A.) from the University of Miami in the United States.

== Political career ==
Before holding the ministerial post in the MOEA, Liang has held several positions, such as Chief of Staff in the Vice Presidential Office, Head of economic division of the Taipei Economic and Cultural Representative Office in the United States and Deputy Director of Bureau of Foreign Trade of the MOEA.

Since joining the government in 1978, Liang has held several key domestic and overseas positions in which he applied his expertise in international economic law and trade negotiations to promote Taiwan's economic development and expand the overseas markets for Taiwan's export sectors.

=== Deputy Minister of Economic Affairs ===
During Liang's concurrent tenures as Vice Minister of Economic Affairs and Chief Trade Negotiator, and later as Deputy Minister, Liang played an instrumental role in the signing of the Economic Cooperation Framework Agreement (ECFA) between China and Taiwan in 2010, a bilateral investment accord with Japan in 2011, the Cross-Straits Investment Protection and Promotion Agreement in 2012, an economic cooperation agreement with New Zealand (ANZTEC) and an economic partnership agreement with Singapore (ASTEP) in 2013. He also co-chaired the first three Regular Meetings of the Cross-Straits Economic Cooperation Committee as Chief Delegate from Taiwan, and actively promoted closer economic and trade relations with the US and the European Union.

In recognition of Liang's achievements, the Ministry of Economic Affairs (MOEA) conferred upon him the Medal of Economic Contribution, First Order, on February 13, 2014, making him the first government official ever to receive the honor.

== Civil career ==
In February 2014, Liang tendered his resignation from the Ministry citing health reasons. He was later appointed as an adviser to the Executive Yuan. In August that year, Liang was appointed the chairman of the Taiwan External Trade Development Council.

Since then, Liang has led a team of over 1,200 trained specialists across its Taipei headquarters, 4 domestic branch offices and 60 overseas branch offices worldwide, organizing more than 300 overseas trade promotion events and 40 international trade shows each year.

== Diplomatic career ==
Liang served as the head of the Taipei Representative Office in Singapore to promote bilateral relations between Taiwan and Singapore from 2016-2023. He retired from public service at the end of his posting.
