= Wang Mei-hua =

Taiwanese politician

- 王美花
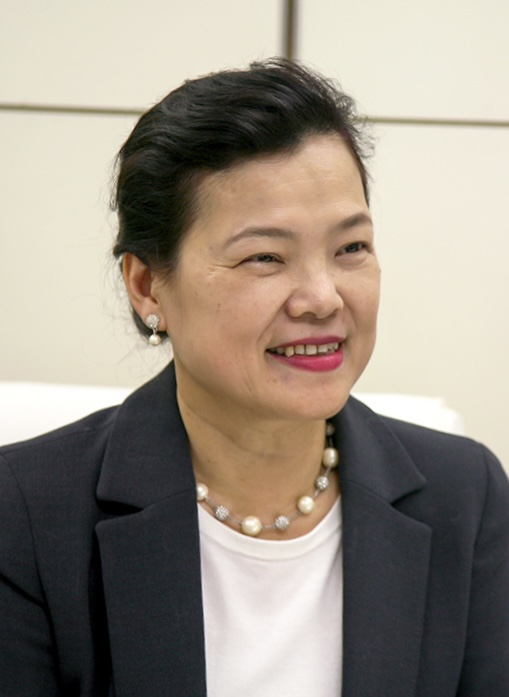
- Official portrait, 2020

35th Minister of Economic Affairs
- In office 19 June 2020 – 20 May 2024
- Premier: Su Tseng-chang; Chen Chien-jen
- Deputy: Tseng Wen-sheng
- Preceded by: Shen Jong-chin
- Succeeded by: J.W. Kuo
Other offices
Deputy Minister of Economic Affairs
In office June 2019 – 19 June 2020 Serving with Tseng Wen-sheng
| Minister | Shen Jong-chin |
| Vice | Lin Chuan-neng |
Vice Minister of Economic Affairs
In office July 2016 – June 2019
| Minister | Lee Chih-kung; Shen Jong-chin |
| Succeeded by |

Personal details
- Born: 10 August 1958 (age 68) Ershui, Changhua, Taiwan
- Party: Independent
- Spouse: Wellington Koo (m. 1983)
- Education: National Taiwan University (LLB)

Wang Mei-hua (Chinese: 王美花; pinyin: Wáng Měihuā; born 10 August 1958) is a Taiwanese politician and lawyer who served as the Minister of Economic Affairs of Taiwan from 2020 to 2024. Prior to her ministership, she also served as the deputy and vice minister of the ministry.

== Education ==
After graduating from Taichung Municipal Taichung Girls' Senior High School, Wang earned her bachelor's degree in law from National Taiwan University.

== Political career ==
Wang was the director-general of the Intellectual Property Office within the Ministry of Economic Affairs until July 2016, when she was named vice minister of economic affairs. She remained vice minister through June 2019, and became deputy minister later that month. Wang was promoted to economic affairs minister on 19 June 2020, succeeding Shen Jong-chin, who had assumed the vice premiership.

== Personal life ==
Wang is married to Wellington Koo.

Political offices
| Preceded by Shen Jong-chin | Minister of Economic Affairs of Taiwan; 2020–2024 | Succeeded by J.W. Kuo |
