= Chen Wen-chang =

Taiwanese chemical engineer (born 1963)

- 陳文章
- Chang in 2023

President of National Taiwan University
- Incumbent
- Assumed office 8 January 2023
- Preceded by: Kuan Chung-ming

Personal details
- Born: April 10, 1963 (age 63) Taichung, Taiwan
- Education: National Taiwan University (BS); University of Rochester (MS, PhD)
- Scientific career
- Fields: Chemical engineering
- Thesis: Small Bandgap Conducting Polymers Based on Conjugated Poly(Heterocycle Methines) (1993)
- Doctoral advisor: Samson Jenekhe

Chen Wen-chang (Chinese: 陳文章; pinyin: Chén Wénzhāng; born April 10, 1963) is a Taiwanese chemical engineer and academic administrator who has been the president of National Taiwan University since 2023.

== Early life and education ==
Chen was born in Shalu, Taichung, on April 10, 1963. He moved with his family to Xinying, Tainan, when he was three years old. His father was a tricycle driver, and his mother was a small business owner. He graduated from National Tainan First Senior High School.

After high school, Chen studied chemical engineering at National Taiwan University (NTU), where he was one of the highest-ranked students of his class (top 6%) and was twice awarded a dean's list scholarship. After graduating from NTU with a Bachelor of Science (B.S.) in 1985, ranked seventh in his class, he completed two years of mandatory military service in the Republic of China Armed Forces.

In the fall of 1987, Chen went to the United States to complete graduate studies at the University of Rochester, where he earned a Master of Science (M.S.) in 1991 and his Ph.D. in 1993, both in chemical engineering. His doctoral dissertation, completed under chemical engineer Samson A. Jenekhe, was titled, Small Bandgap Conducting Polymers Based on Conjugated Poly(Heterocycle Methines). As a graduate student, he won the university's Elon Huntington Hooker Fellowship.

== Academic career ==
After completing his doctorate, Chen joined the Chemical Industry Research Institute of the Industrial Technology Research Institute (ITRI), where he worked on gradient-index optical lenses and optical communications fibers before returning to academia in 1996. In August 1996, he joined the Department of Chemical Engineering at National Taiwan University (NTU) as an associate professor, and was promoted to a full professorship in August 2000. NTU appointed him a distinguished professor in 2006.

Chen was director of the Institute of Polymer Science and Engineering at NTU from August 2005 to July 2011 and director of the university's Polymer Nanotechnology Research Center from 2007 to 2013. He served as polymer program coordinator for Taiwan's National Science Council from January 2009 through December 2011. Chen was associate dean of the NTU College of Engineering from August 2011 to July 2017 and director of its Center of Strategic Materials Alliance for Research and Technology from June 2013 through December 2017. He also directed NTU's Center for Southeast Asia Education from June 2017 to March 2019. In August 2017, Chen became dean of the College of Engineering, a position he held until January 2023. He additionally became director of NTU's Advanced Research Center for Green Materials Science and Technology in June 2018.

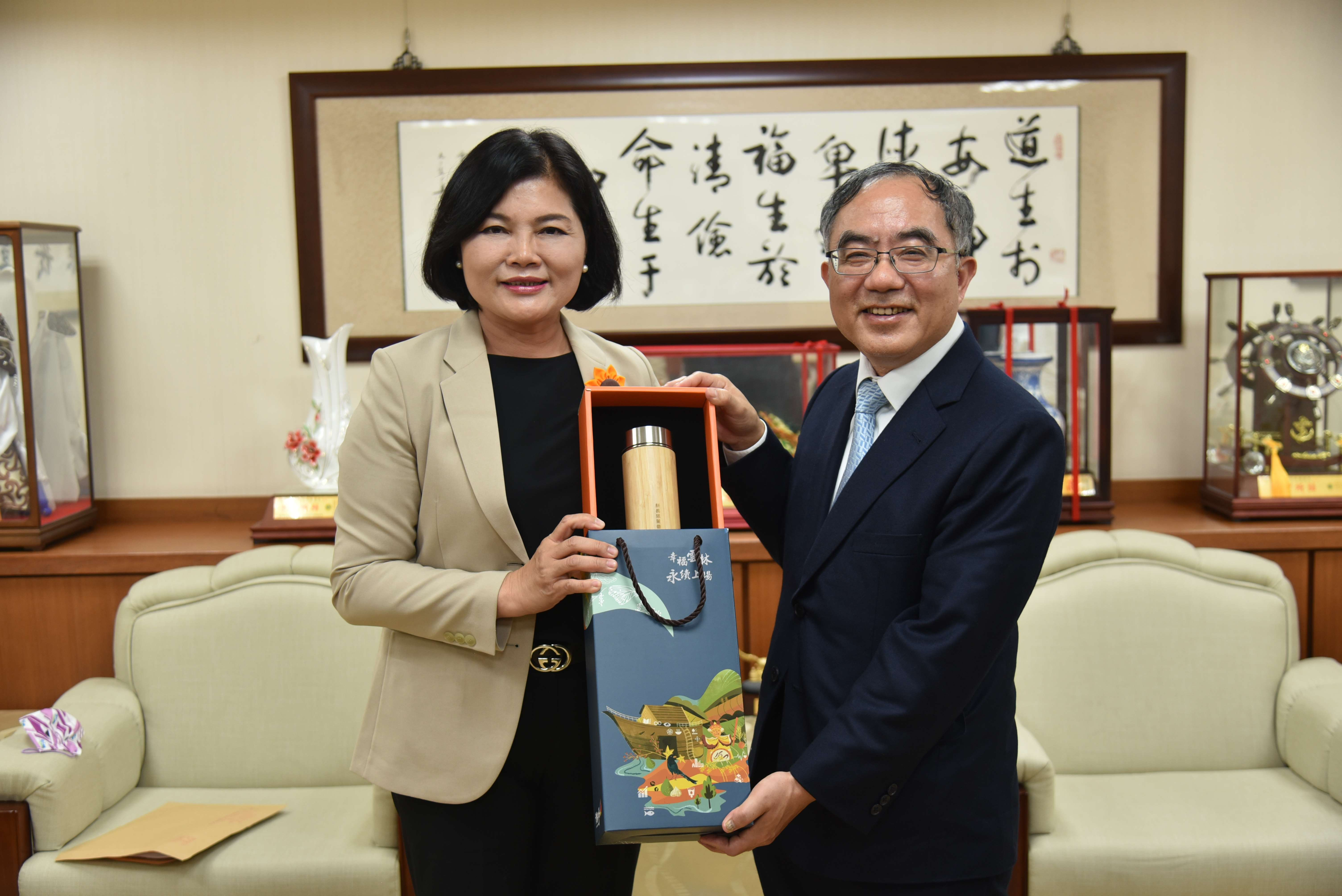
Chen with Yunlin magistrate Chang Li-shan in 2023

Chen served as president of the Polymer Society, Taipei, from March 2018 to February 2020 and as president of the Federation of Asian Polymer Societies from November 2019 to June 2021. In 2018, Chen and French polymer scientist Redouane Borsali received the 20th Franco-Taiwanese Scientific Grand Prize for their research on using renewable materials in electronic devices. At the annual meeting of the Society of Polymer Science, Japan in 2019, he received its International Award for his contributions to organic polymers and nanostructured materials for electronic and optoelectronic applications. The Ministry of Education selected Chen as a National Chair Professor in engineering and applied science in 2020. He was selected for the National Chair a second time as a member of its 28th cohort in 2024, giving him the status of lifetime honorary National Chair Professor.

=== President of National Taiwan University (2023–present) ===
On October 7, 2022, NTU's presidential selection committee chose Chen as the university's thirteenth president after two rounds of voting among six finalists. The Ministry of Education approved his appointment later that month for a four-year term running from January 8, 2023, through January 7, 2027. Chen succeeded Kuan Chung-ming as president and has continued to hold a professorship in chemical engineering while directing the Advanced Research Center for Green Materials Science and Technology.

== Research ==
Chen's research has focused on electronic and optoelectronic polymers, including controlling the electronic and optical properties of donor–acceptor polymers and applying polymeric materials to light-emitting diodes, thin-film transistors, solar cells, memory devices and integrated soft electronics. His work has also encompassed polymer nanomaterials and nanocomposite optical materials, including organic memory devices, polymer thin-film transistors, solar-energy devices and optical films.

In October 2023, the Université Grenoble Alpes conferred an honorary doctorate on Chen in recognition of his research international collaboration. In May 2025, the French government appointed him a Knight of the Legion of Honour in recognition of his work promoting scientific research, academic exchange and cultural ties between France and Taiwan.

== Personal life ==
Chen is married and has two daughters.
