= Cheng Shiu University =

University in Niaosong, Kaohsiung, Taiwan

- 正修科技大學
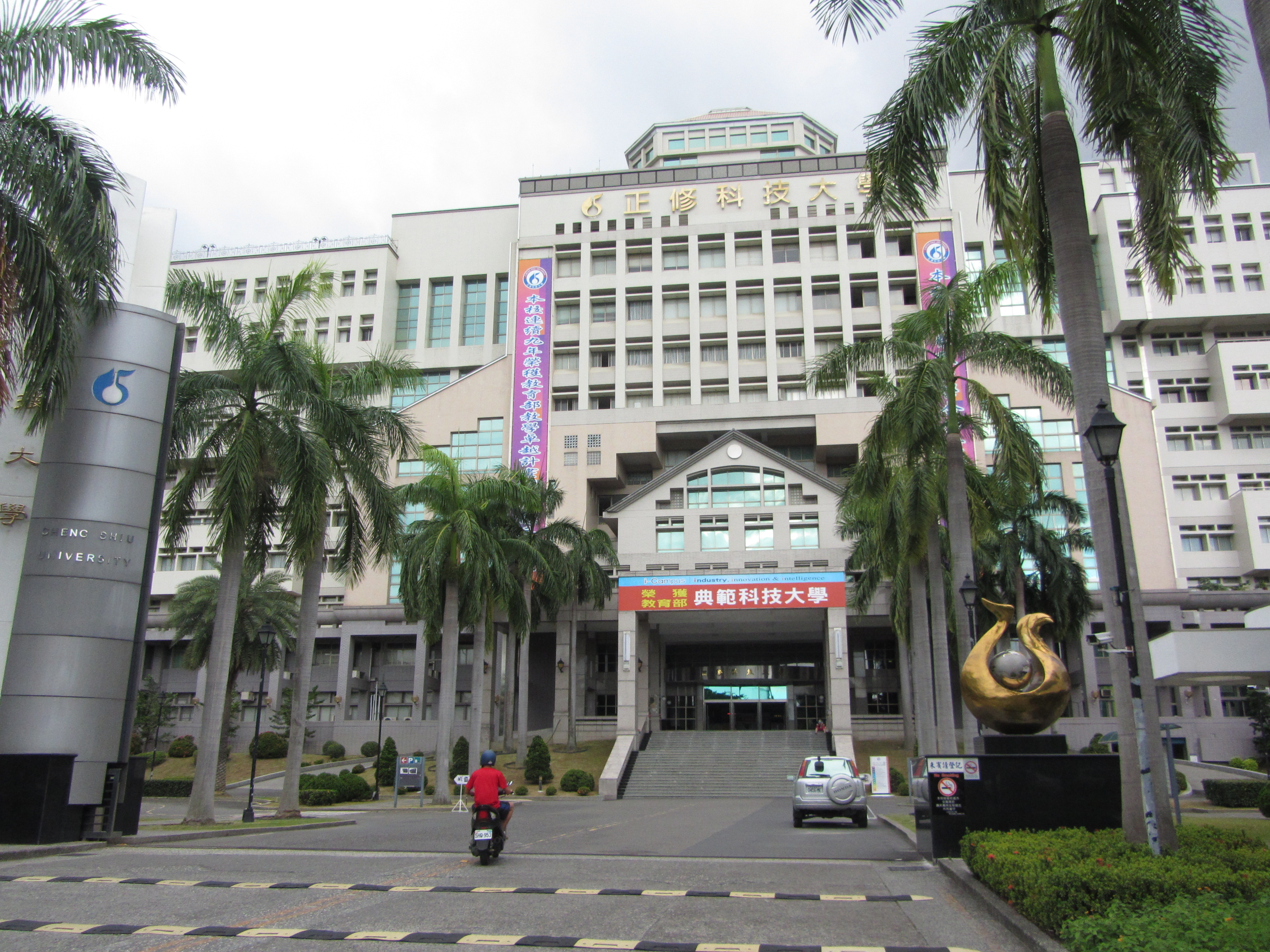
- Motto in English: Unto Perfection
- Type: private university
- Established: 1965 (as Cheng-Shiu Junior College of Technology); 2003 (as CSU)
- Location: Niaosong, Kaohsiung, Taiwan; 22°39′1.2″N 120°21′0.0″E
- Website: Official website

Cheng Shiu University
- Traditional Chinese: 正修科技大學
- Simplified Chinese: 正修科技大学
Transcriptions
Standard Mandarin
- Hanyu Pinyin: Zhēngxiū Kējì Dàxué
Southern Min
- Hokkien POJ: Chèng-siu Kho-ki Tāi-ha̍k

Cheng Shiu University (CSU; Chinese: 正修科技大學; Pe̍h-ōe-jī: Chèng-siu Kho-ki Tāi-ha̍k) is a private university located in Niaosong District, Kaohsiung, Taiwan. CSU offers a wide range of undergraduate and graduate programs across several faculties, including the College of Humanities and Social Sciences, the College of Business, the College of Engineering, and the College of Information and Electrical Engineering.

The university offers a range of international programs, including study abroad opportunities, international internships, and language programs.

== History ==
Established in 1965, it was founded by three friends, Lee Cheng-Sheng (李金盛), Gong Junke, and Zheng Junyuan. It was initially named Cheng-Shiu Junior College of Technology. It became Cheng-Shiu Institute of Technology and Commerce in 1980 after being reorganized and approved by the Ministry of Education. In 1999, it became Cheng Shiu Institute of Technology, and in 2003 it was upgraded to its current name.

== Faculties ==
- College of Engineering
- College of Management
- College of Life and Creativity
- Center for General Education
- Center for Teacher Education

== Notable alumni ==
- Chu Hsing-yu, member of Legislative Yuan (1993–2005)
- Li Mei-jhen, councilor of Kaohsiung City Council
- J.W. Kuo, government minister

== See also ==
- List of universities in Taiwan
