= Chen Chien-liang =

Taiwanese economist (born 1963)

- 陳建良

Deputy Minister of National Development Council of the Republic of China
- Incumbent
- Assumed office 22 January 2014
- Minister: Kuan Chung-ming
- Preceded by: Position established
- Succeeded by: Lin Huan

Deputy Minister of Council for Economic Planning and Development of the Republic of China
- In office 2013 – 21 January 2014
- Minister: Kuan Chung-ming
- Preceded by: Wu Ming-ji
- Succeeded by: Position abolished

Personal details
- Born: November 19, 1963 (age 62) Tainan, Taiwan
- Education: National Chengchi University (BA, MA); University of California, Los Angeles (MA, PhD)

Chen Chien-liang (Chinese: 陳建良; pinyin: Chén Jiànliáng; born November 19, 1963) is a Taiwanese economist. He was the deputy minister of the National Development Council of the Executive Yuan since 22 January 2014.

== Early life and education ==
Chen was born on November 19, 1963, in Tainan. He graduated from National Chengchi University with a bachelor's degree in economics in 1987 and a master's degree in economics in 1989. He then completed doctoral studies in the United States, where he earned a Master of Arts (M.A.) in 1995 and his Ph.D. in economics from the University of California, Los Angeles, in 1995 under economics professors Arnold Harberger and Duncan Thomas. His doctoral dissertation was titled, "Household consumption and saving behavior: evidence from Taiwanese household surveys".

== See also ==
- National Development Council (Republic of China)
