= Chang Chia-juch =

Taiwanese politician

- 張家祝
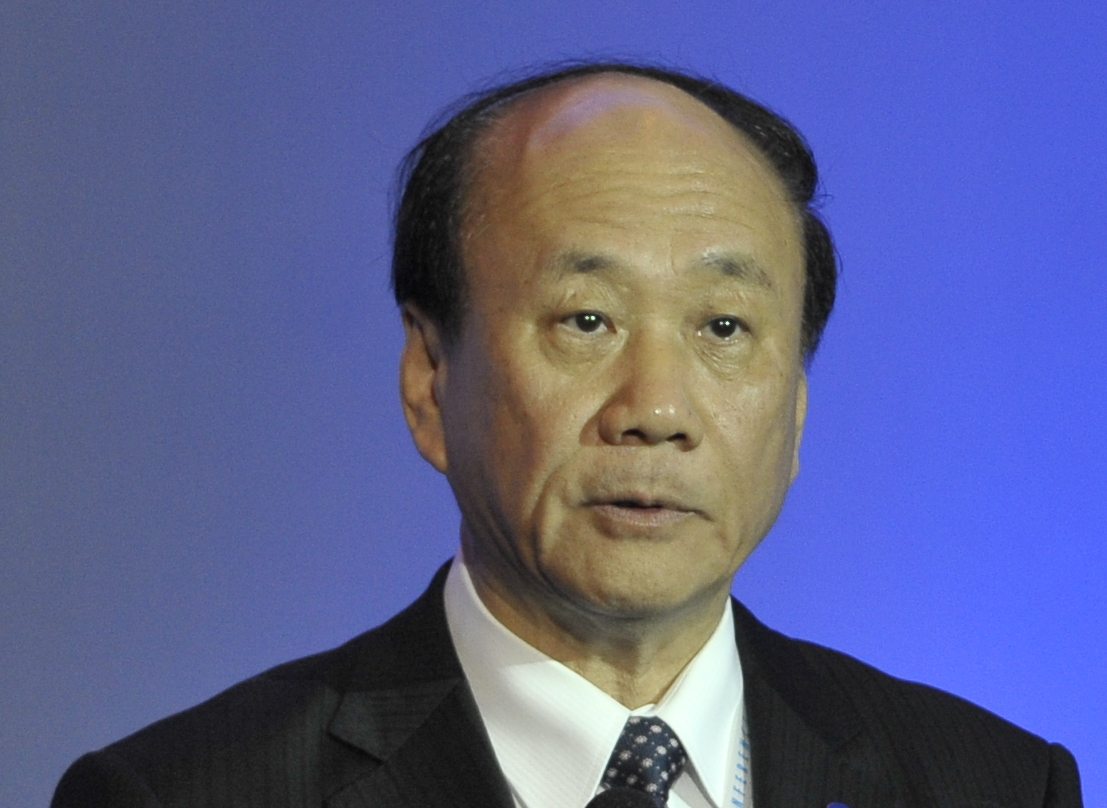
- Chang in 2013

Minister of Economic Affairs of the Republic of China
- In office 18 February 2013 – 10 August 2014
- Deputy: Francis Liang; Woody Duh
- Vice: Woody Duh, Cho Shih-chao; Cho Shih-chao, Shen Jong-chin
- Preceded by: Shih Yen-shiang
- Succeeded by: Woody Duh

Vice Minister of Transportation and Communications of the Republic of China
- In office 1995–2005
- Minister: Tsai Chao-yang; Lin Fong-cheng; Yeh Chu-lan; Lin Ling-san; Kuo Yao-chi

Personal details
- Born: 25 June 1950 (age 76) Shanghai, China
- Party: Kuomintang
- Education: National Cheng Kung University (BS); San Jose State University (MS); Purdue University (PhD)
- Scientific career
- Fields: Transportation engineering
- Thesis: A Rail System Optimization Model for the Transportation of Coal (1979)
- Doctoral advisor: Robert D. Miles

Chang Chia-juch (Chinese: 張家祝; pinyin: Zhāng Jiāzhù; born 25 June 1950) is a Taiwanese engineer and politician who was Minister of Economic Affairs from 2013 to 2014.

== Early life and education ==
Chang was born in Shanghai on June 25, 1950, and moved with his family to Taiwan during the Great Retreat. After high school, he graduated from National Cheng Kung University with a B.S. in civil engineering in 1973. He then completed doctoral studies in the United States, earning an M.S. in civil engineering from San Jose State University in 1976 and his Ph.D. in transportation engineering from Purdue University in 1979 under professor Robert D. Miles. His doctoral dissertation was titled, "A Rail System Optimization Model for the Transportation of Coal".

== ROC Economic Affairs Ministry ==
=== Longmen nuclear power plant ===
In mid April 2013, commenting on Taiwan's fourth nuclear power plant construction, Chang said that the power plant has undergone rigorous integration and testing, therefore it is inappropriate to call the plant as an "assembled car". He added that the MOEA has created a team to inspect the overall system of the plant over the next six months to end the controversy.

=== Electric vehicle industry ===
Speaking at an automotive trade show in mid April 2013, Chang spoke about Taiwan's young electric vehicle industry. In the midst of growing world oil price and rising environmental awareness, he said that the MOEA is currently considering efforts to lower the cost of manufacturing, marketing and distributing electric vehicles to general public.

However, he acknowledged the current stumbling blocks for common usage of electric vehicle, especially on the current technology and availability of the charging stations around Taiwan.

=== 2013 H7N9 flu virus outbreak ===
At the end of April 2013 during the H7N9 flu virus outbreak, citing from the research result from Taiwan Institute of Economic Research, Chang warned that if this outbreak continues for three months, Taiwan's GDP forecast will drop by 0.004%. The flu will also hit Taiwan's consumption, production and export-related sectors if the outbreak gets worse. To mitigate this situation, Chang said that the MOEA has prepared a special task force to monitor the ongoing situation, and they will aim to be well-prepared to prevent the disease from spreading further.

=== Taiwan's Q1 2013 economic growth ===
Commenting on Taiwan's Q1 2013 lower-than-expected 1.54% economic growth at Legislative Yuan in the end of April 2013, Chang said the MOEA will continue to promote policies to strengthen Taiwan's export and domestic investment. He also reassure people to be more optimistic on the annual GDP growth, because low GDP growth in Q1 doesn't mean low GDP growth in the remaining quarters in the same year.

=== 2014 APEC Ministerial meeting ===
In mid May 2014 during the Asia-Pacific Economic Cooperation (APEC) Ministerial meeting in Qingdao, Shandong, Chang had a meeting with PRC Minister of Commerce Gao Hucheng. Chang asked the Mainland China side to give a pragmatic response to the key problems that are the challenges to the singing of the Cross-Strait Service Trade Agreement between the two sides, in which those problems are linked primarily to the industrial sectors. Gao promised that the Mainland side will continue their internal coordination and reiterated Beijing's effort to promote a win-win condition for cross-strait exchanges.
