= Chu Hsing-yu =

Taiwanese politician

- 朱星羽
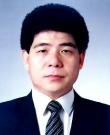

Member of the Legislative Yuan
- In office 1 February 1993 – 31 January 2005
- Constituency: Kaohsiung I

Personal details
- Born: 22 December 1956 Gushan, Kaohsiung, Taiwan
- Died: 18 February 2013 (aged 56) Sanmin, Kaohsiung, Taiwan
- Party: Non-Partisan Solidarity Union
- Other political affiliations: Democratic Progressive Party (until 2003)

Chu Hsing-yu (Chinese: 朱星羽; pinyin: Zhū Xīngyǔ; 22 December 1956 – 18 February 2013) was a Taiwanese politician.

Chu Hsing-yu was born in Gushan District, Kaohsiung. He succeeded his father, a cement worker by trade, as district chief when the elder Chu was diagnosed with lung disease. Upon completing his father's term, Chu was elected to the position himself. During this time, he earned a college degree from Cheng-Shiu Institute of Technology and Commerce. Chu then served two terms on the Kaohsiung City Council. In 1992, Chu won his first election to the Legislative Yuan. He left the Democratic Progressive Party in 2003, and served a portion of his final legislative term as an independent. Though he was invited to campaign for DPP candidates in 2004, he rejected the offer.

As a legislator, Chu became known for controversial statements and a combative personality, for which his DPP membership had been repeatedly suspended. He was involved in at least three such confrontations in 2004, by which time he had left the Democratic Progressive Party. In April, Chu challenged interior minister Su Jia-chyuan to solve the 3-19 shooting incident in a year's time. If Su was successful, Chu pledged to commit suicide. Chu punched Yu Jane-daw and William Lai in separate incidents later that year.

Chu did not run for reelection in 2004, but joined the Non-Partisan Solidarity Union after stepping down from the legislature, retiring to live alone on Guanyinshan. He died in 2013 of a heart attack, aged 56, while staying at a motel in Sanmin District, Kaohsiung.
