= Samson Jenekhe =

Nigerian-born chemical engineer

- Born: Okpella, Nigeria

Academic background
- Education: Michigan Technological University (BS); University of Minnesota (MS, PhD)

Academic work
- Institutions: University of Rochester; University of Washington
- Website: https://www.cheme.washington.edu/facultyfinder/samson-a-jenekhe

Samson Ally Jenekhe is the Boeing-Martin Professor of Chemical Engineering and Professor of Chemistry at the University of Washington. Jenekhe was previously a chemical engineer at the University of Rochester where his work focused on semiconducting polymers and quantum wires. He has authored over 300 research articles and 28 patents.

== Early life and education ==
Samson earned his Bachelor of Science in engineering from Michigan Technological University and his doctoral degree from the University of Minnesota.

== Career ==
Jenekhe joined the faculty of chemistry at the University of Washington in 2000 as a professor of chemical engineering and chemistry. In 2003, he was one of three University of Washington Professors elected to the American Association for the Advancement of Science.

In 2013, he was elected to the Washington State Academy of Sciences. The next year, he was listed by the Clean Energy Institute as one of the 2014 Highly Cited Researchers.

He was elected a Fellow of the American Physical Society in 2003. Jenekhe has been selected as the 2021 recipient of the APS Polymer Physics Prize "for pioneering and sustained outstanding contributions to the synthesis, photophysics, and structure-morphology-performance relationships in semiconducting polymers for electronic and photovoltaic applications."

== Honors and fellowships ==
- APS Polymer Physics Prize, 2021
- Charles M. A. Stine Award for Excellence in Materials Science and Engineering, 2014
- Member of the Washington State Academy of Sciences, 2013
- In 2022, Jenekhe was elected to the National Academy of Engineering.

== Selected publications ==
- Li, H.; Kim, F. S.; Ren, G.; Jenekhe, S. A. “High Mobility n-Type Conjugated Polymers for Organic Electronics,” J. Am. Chem. Soc. 2013, 135, 14920-14923. DOI:10.1021/ja407471b.
- Earmme, T.; Hwang, Y. J.; Murari, N. M.; Subramaniyan, S.; Jenekhe, S. A. “All-Polymer Solar Cells with 3.3% Efficiency Based on Naphthalene Diimide-Selenophene Copolymer Acceptor,” J. Am. Chem. Soc. 2013, 135, 14960-14963. DOI: 10.1021/ja4085429.
- Richards, J. J.; Rice, A. H.; Nelson, R. M.; Kim, F. S.; Jenekhe, S. A.; Luscombe, C. K.; Pozzo, D. C. “Modification of PCBM crystallization via incorporation of C60 in polymer/fullerene solar cells,” Adv. Funct. Mater. 2013, 23, 514-522.
- Colbert, A.; Janke, E.; Hsieh, S.; Subramaniyan, S.; Schlenker, C. W.; Jenekhe, S. A.; Ginger, D. S. “Hole Transfer from Low Bandgap Quantum Dots to Conjugated Polymers in Organic/Inorganic Hybrid Photovoltaics,” J. Phys. Chem. Lett. 2013, 4, 280-284.
- Ren, G.; Schlenker, C. W.; Ahmed, E.; Subramaniyan, S.; Olthof, S.; Kahn, A.; Ginger, D. S.; Jenekhe, S. A. “Photoinduced Hole Transfer Becomes Suppressed with Diminished Driving Force in Polymer-Fullerene Solar Cells While Electron Transfer Remains Active,” Adv. Funct. Mater. 2013, 23, 1238-1249.
- Strein, E.; Colbert, A.; Nagaoka, H.; Subramaniyan, S.; Schlenker, C. W.; Janke, E.; Jenekhe, S. A.; Ginger, D. S. “Charge Generation and Energy Transfer in Hybrid Polymer/Infrared Quantum Dot Solar Cells,” Energy Environ. Sci. 2013, 6, 769-775.
- Hahm, S. G.; Rho, Y.; Jung, J.; Kim, S. H.; Sajoto, T.; Kim, F. S.; Barlow, S.; Park, C. E.; Jenekhe, S. A.; Marder, S. R.; Ree, M. “High-Performance n-Channel Thin-Film Field-Effect Transistors Based on a Nanowire-Forming Polymer,” Adv. Funct. Mater. 2013, 23, 2060-2071.
- Tucker, N. M.; Briseno, A. L.; Acton, O.; Yip, H. L.; Ma, H.; Jenekhe, S. A.; Xia, Y.; Jen, A. K. Y. “Solvent-Dispersed Benzothiadiazole-Tetrathiafulvalene Single-Crystal Nanowires and Their Application in Field-Effect Transistors,” ACS Appl. Mater. Interfaces 2013, 5, 2320-2324.
- Li, H.; Kim, F. S.; Ren, G.; Hollenbeck, E. C.; Subramaniyan, S.; Jenekhe, S. A. “Tetraazabenzodifluoranthene Diimides: New Building Blocks for Solution Processable N-Type Organic Semiconductors,” Angew. Chem. Int. Ed. 2013, 52, 5513-5517.
- Hwang, Y. J.; Murari, N. M.; Jenekhe, S. A. “New n-Type Polymer Semiconductors Based on Naphthalene Diimide and Selenophene Derivatives for Organic Field-Effect Transistors,” Polym. Chem. 2013, 4, 3187-3195.
- Earmme, T.; Jenekhe, S. A. “Improved electron injection and transport by use of baking soda as a low-cost, air-stable, n-dopant for solution-processed phosphorescent organic light-emitting diodes,” Appl. Phys. Lett. 2013, 102, 233305/1-4.
- Shoaee, S.; Subramaniyan, S.; Xin, H.; Keiderling, C.; Tuladhar, P. S.; Jamieson, F.; Jenekhe, S. A.; Durrant, J. R. “Charge photogeneration for a series of thiazolo-thiazole donor polymers blended with the fullerene electron acceptors PCBM and ICBA,” Adv. Funct. Mater. 2013, 23, 3286-3298.
