= Woody Duh =

Taiwanese politician (born 1959)

Duh Tyzz-jiun
- 杜紫軍
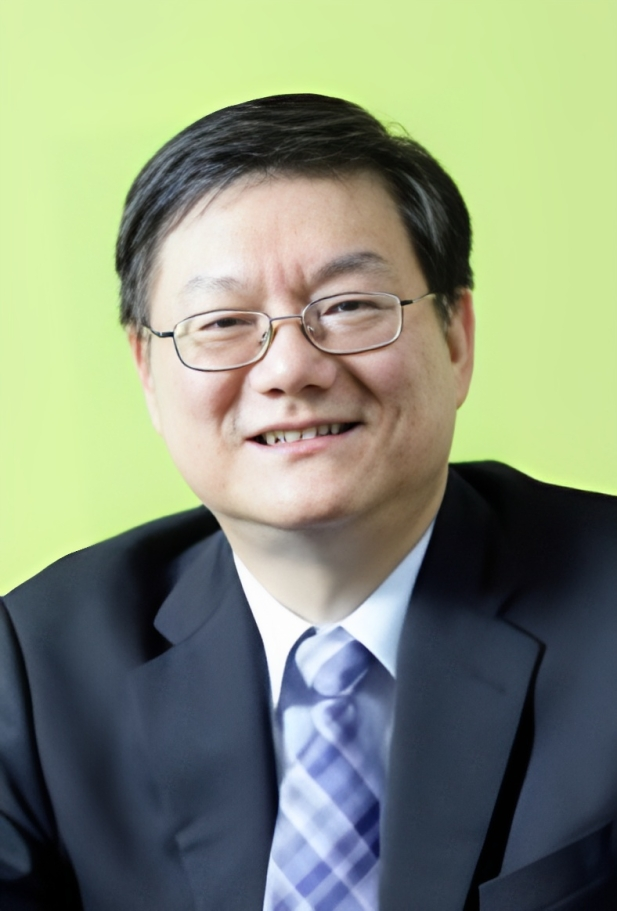

Vice Premier of the Republic of China
- In office 1 February 2016 – 20 May 2016
- Premier: Chang San-cheng
- Preceded by: Chang San-cheng

Minister of the National Development Council
- In office 4 February 2015 – 31 January 2016
- Preceded by: Kuan Chung-ming
- Succeeded by: Lin Chu-chia

Governor of Fujian Province
- In office 8 December 2014 – 31 January 2016
- Preceded by: John Deng
- Succeeded by: Lin Chu-chia

Minister without Portfolio
- In office 8 December 2014 – 31 January 2016
- Preceded by: John Deng
- Succeeded by: Lin Chu-chia

Minister of Economic Affairs
- In office 10 August 2014 – 7 December 2014
- Vice Minister: Cho Shih-chao, Shen Jong-chin
- Preceded by: Chang Chia-juch
- Succeeded by: John Deng

Deputy Minister of Economic Affairs
- In office February 2014 – 10 August 2014
- Minister: Chang Chia-juch
- Vice: Cho Shih-chao, Shen Jong-chin
- Succeeded by: Vacant

Vice Minister of Economic Affairs
- In office June 2012 – February 2014
- Minister: Chang Chia-juch
- Deputy: Francis Liang
- Vice: Cho Shih-chao
- Succeeded by: Shen Jong-chin

Personal details
- Born: 23 October 1959 (age 66)
- Party: Independent
- Education: National Taiwan University (BS, MS, PhD)

Duh Tyzz-jiun (Chinese: 杜紫軍; pinyin: Dù Zǐjūn; Pe̍h-ōe-jī: Tō͘ Chú-kun; born 23 October 1959), also known by his English name Woody, is a Taiwanese agricultural scientist and politician who served as Vice Premier of the Republic of China from February 2016 to May 2016. He was previously the governor of Fujian Province from 2014 to 2016 and Minister of Economic Affairs from August 2014 to December 2014.

== Early life and education ==
Duh was born on October 23, 1959. After graduating from Kaohsiung Municipal Kaohsiung Senior High School, he studied forestry at National Taiwan University, where he earned his bachelor's degree, master's degree, and then his Ph.D. in 1992, all in agricultural science with a specialization in forestry. His doctoral dissertation was titled, "Comparison of the application of various analytical instruments in pulp cooking control and pulp lignin content determination" (Chinese: 多種分析儀器在製漿蒸煮控制及紙漿木質素含量測定上之應用比較).

In 1993, Duh completed postdoctoral research in environmental engineering in the United States at the State University of New York College of Environmental Science and Forestry.

== Early career ==
In his early career, Duh worked as a specialist at the MOEA National Bureau of Standards in 1983–1994, Executive Officer and Section Chief of 5th Directorate of the Executive Yuan in 1994–1997, Senior Technical Specialist of the Industrial Development Bureau (IDB) in 1997, Director of the 6th Division of the IDB in 1997–2001, Chief Secretary of IDB in 2001–2003, Deputy Director-General of the MOEA Small and Medium Enterprise Administration in 2003-2004, and as Chief Secretary of Council for Economic Planning and Development in 2004. He then remained in the MOEA serving as the Director-General of the Department of Commerce in 2004–2006, Counselor in 2006–2007, Director-General of the Department of Industrial Technology in 2007-2009m and Director-General of the IDB in 2009–2012.

== Economic Affairs Vice Minister ==
=== Chang Chi Foodstuff Factory Co cooking oil scandal ===
Responding to the scandal regarding the adulteration and mislabeling of cooking oil made by Chang Chi Foodstuff Factory Co. in October 2013, Duh said that although the cooking oil company had obtained the Good Manufacturing Practice (GMD) certificate, the company might give wrong information regarding their manufacturing process to the Industrial Development Bureau. He said that currently the bureau is reviewing the GMD system and might require manufacturers to present its export and import activities and declaration and to allow on-the-spot inspection of their production lines when seeking certification.

== Economics minister ==
Duh was the Minister of Economic Affairs (MOEA) of the Republic of China from 10 August 2014 after his predecessor Chang Chia-juch's resignation amid the 2014 Kaohsiung gas explosions. He tendered his resignation from the post on 30 November 2014 after the 2014 Republic of China local election.
