= Tomoki =

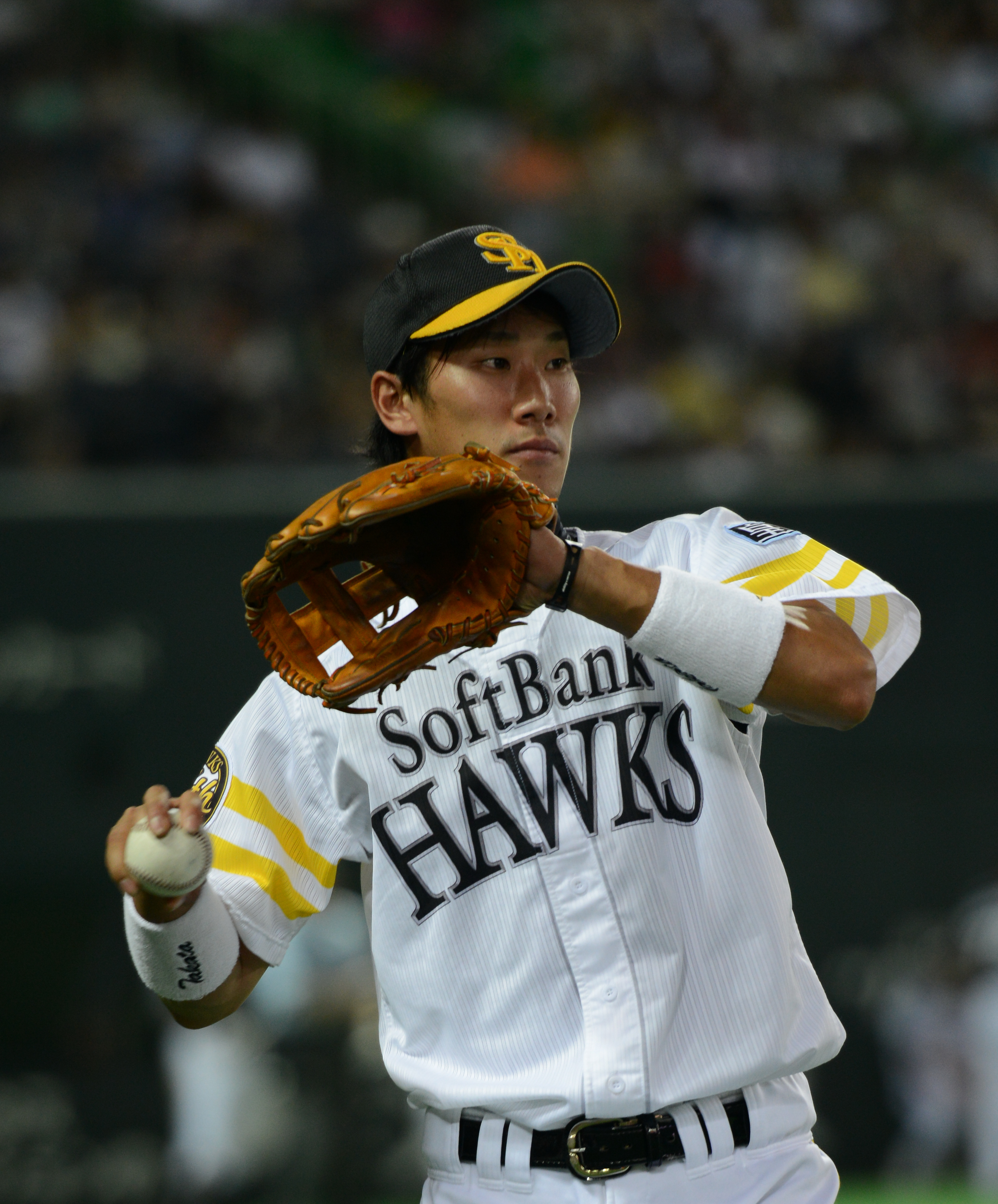
- Tomoki Takata, Japanese baseball player
- Pronunciation: tomokʲi (IPA)
- Gender: Male

Origin
- Origin: Japanese
- Meaning: Different meanings depending on the kanji used

Tomoki is a masculine Japanese given name which is the male counterpart of Tomoko.

== Written forms ==
Tomoki can be written using many different combinations of kanji characters. Some examples:

- 友紀, "friend, chronicle"
- 友規, "friend, to scheme"
- 友喜, "friend, rejoice"
- 友貴, "friend, precious"
- 友機, "friend, opportunity/machine"
- 友基, "friend, foundation"
- 友輝, "friend, sparkle"
- 友起, "friend, rise/wake up"
- 友希, "friend, hope"
- 友毅, "friend, firm"
- 知紀, "know, chronicle"
- 知規, "know, to scheme"
- 知喜, "know, rejoice"
- 知貴, "know, precious"
- 知機, "know, opportunity/machine"
- 知樹, "know, tree"
- 智紀, "intellect, chronicle"
- 智規, "intellect, to scheme"
- 智喜, "intellect, rejoice"
- 智貴, "intellect, precious"
- 智輝, "intellect, sparkle"
- 共紀, "together, chronicle"
- 共貴, "together, precious"
- 朋喜, "companion, rejoice"
- 朋毅, "companion, firm"
- 朝紀, "morning/dynasty, chronicle"
- 朝機, "morning/dynasty, opportunity/machine"
- 朝樹, "morning/dynasty, tree"
- 朝毅, "morning/dynasty, firm"

The name can also be written in hiragana ともき or katakana トモキ.

== Notable people with the name ==
- Tomoki Hasegawa (長谷川 智樹; born 1957), Japanese composer and arranger
- Tomoki Hoshino (星野 智樹; born 1977), Japanese baseball player
- Tomoki Ikemoto (池元 友樹; born 1985), Japanese footballer
- Tomoki Imai (今井 智基; born 1990), Japanese footballer
- Tomoki Iwata (岩田 智輝; born 1997), Japanese footballer
- Tomoki Kameda (亀田 和毅; born 1991), Japanese Mexican boxer
- Tomoki Kikuya (菊谷 知樹; born 1968), Japanese composer and arranger
- Tomoki Kobayashi (小林 智樹; born 1969), Japanese anime director
- Tomoki Kyoda (京田 知己; born 1970), Japanese anime director
- Tomoki Suzuki (鈴木 智樹; born 1985), Japanese footballer
- Tomoki Takata (高田 知季; born 1990), Japanese baseball player
- Tomoki Ueda (上田 智輝; born 1996), Japanese footballer
- Tomoki Yoshida (吉田 智紀; born 1982), Japanese rugby union player
- Tomoki Yoshikawa (吉川 智貴; born 1989), Japanese futsal player

== Fictional characters ==
- Tomoki Sakurai (桜井 智樹), protagonist of the manga series Sora no Otoshimono
- Tomoki Himi (氷見 友樹), Tommy Himi in English dub, a character from Digimon Frontier
- Tomoki Kuroki (黒木 智貴), a character in Watamote

== See also ==
- 6101 Tomoki, a main-belt minor planet
