= Kuan Chung-ming =

Taiwanese economist

- 管中閔
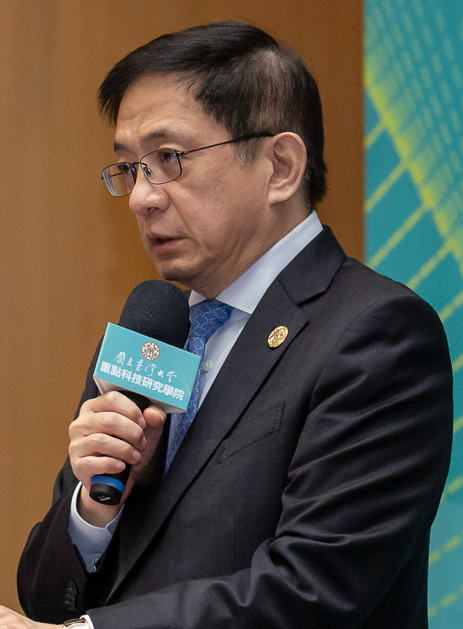
- Kuan in 2021

President of National Taiwan University
- In office 8 January 2019 – 7 January 2023
- Preceded by: Tei-Wei Kuo (interim); Yang Pan-chyr
- Succeeded by: Chen Wen-chang

Minister of the National Development Council
- In office 22 January 2014 – 4 February 2015
- Deputy: Hwang Wang-hsiang, Chen Chien-liang, Sung Yu-hsieh
- Preceded by: Himself (as Minister of the Council for Economic Planning and Development)
- Succeeded by: Woody Duh

Minister of the Council for Economic Planning and Development
- In office 18 February 2013 – 21 January 2014
- Deputy: Hwang Wang-hsiang, Chen Chien-liang, Chen Hsiao-hung
- Preceded by: Yiin Chii-ming
- Succeeded by: Himself (as Minister of the National Development Council)

Personal details
- Born: 15 August 1956 (age 70) Taipei, Taiwan
- Education: Chinese Culture University (BA); University of California, Davis (MA); University of California, San Diego (PhD)
- Scientific career
- Fields: Econometrics
- Thesis: Estimation of neural network models (1989)
- Doctoral advisor: Halbert White; Clive Granger

Kuan Chung-ming (Chinese: 管中閔; pinyin: Guǎn Zhōngmǐn; born 15 August 1956) is a Taiwanese economist and econometrician. He was the president of National Taiwan University (NTU) from 2019 to 2023.

After graduating from Chinese Culture University, Kuan earned his doctorate in economics in 1989 from the University of California, San Diego, under Halbert White and Clive Granger. He returned to Taiwan in 1994 and became a professor of economics at NTU, then an economics researcher at Academia Sinica, where he was later elected an academician. He served in the Kuomintang government as a minister without portfolio and as the head of the Council for Economic Planning and Development and its successor, the National Development Council, from 2013 to 2015.

Kuan was elected NTU president in January 2018, but the Ministry of Education delayed his appointment for nearly a year over an alleged conflict of interest, a dispute that led to the resignations of three education ministers. He took office in January 2019 and garnered controversy for having written paid magazine editorials while serving as a minister. He declined to seek a second term and was succeeded by Chen Wen-chang in 2023.

== Early life and education ==
Kuan was born on 15 August 1956 in Taipei, Taiwan. His father, Kuan Chi-yu (管起予), was a native of Huaining County, Anhui, China, who relocated to Taiwan after the Chinese Civil War during the Great Retreat in 1949. His mother, Lin Su-zhuang (林素粧), was born in Xiamen, Fujian, China, and moved to Taiwan in 1947, where she became a clerk at National Taiwan University in 1948. His parents married in 1953, and his elder brother was born the following year.

Kuan attended kindergarten at the Affiliated Experimental Elementary School of National Chengchi University, where he was a member of its second kindergarten class. In 1968, he attended the private Ta Hwa Junior High School. He then enrolled at Taipei Municipal Chien Kuo High School in 1971.

After high school, Kuan graduated from Chinese Culture University with a bachelor's degree in economics in 1978. He then completed compulsory military service as a reserve officer on Dongyin Island, after which he pursued graduate studies in the United States. He earned his Master of Arts in economics from the University of California, Davis in 1984. He then earned his Ph.D. in econometrics from the University of California, San Diego in 1989. His doctoral dissertation, completed under economist Halbert White and Nobel Prize laureate Clive Granger, was titled, Estimation of Neural Network Models.

== Academic career ==
After completing his doctorate, Kuan became an assistant professor of economics at the University of Illinois Urbana-Champaign in August 1989. He received teaching awards from the university in 1990, 1991, 1992, and 1993. In August 1994, Kuan returned to Taiwan and became a professor of economics at National Taiwan University (NTU). He initially took leave from the University of Illinois, where he was promoted to an associate professor with tenure in August 1995 before leaving the institution in July 1996. He remained a full-time professor in NTU's Department of Economics until July 1999.

In June 1999, Kuan was appointed director of the Social Science Research Center of Taiwan's National Science Council, serving until July 2001. He joined the Institute of Economics at Academia Sinica as a research fellow in August 1999. Kuan became director of the institute in August 2001 and held the position until August 2007. During his directorship, he was promoted to distinguished research fellow in September 2004, a position he retained until January 2009. He also was a visiting professor of economics at the University of California, San Diego, from September to December 2005. From January to May 2008, Kuan was a visiting professor of economics at the University of Southern California.

In February 2009, Kuan returned to NTU as a distinguished professor in the Department of Finance and was appointed an NTU University Chair Professor. He also held a joint appointment in the university's Department of Economics. Between February 2009 and February 2012, he maintained a joint research appointment with Academia Sinica's Institute of Economics, returning to the institute in the same capacity between August 2015 and July 2018.

Kuan served as president of the Taiwan Economic Association in 2003. He was also associate editor and subsequently editor-in-chief of the economics journal Taiwan Economic Review between 1994 and 1998. From 1998 to 2001, he held editorial positions at Academia Economic Papers, including that of executive editor. He was also an associate editor of the Journal of Econometrics between 1999 and 2008 and of Econometric Reviews beginning in 2004.

== National Taiwan University presidency ==
=== Election and appointment dispute ===
On 5 January 2018, Kuan was elected president of National Taiwan University (NTU) to fill the seat left vacant by Yang Pan-chyr, who chose not to serve another term when his tenure expired in June 2017. Kuan had been due to begin his term on 1 February 2018, but it was delayed by controversy over his position on the board of a private company and by allegations of plagiarism. Kuan was an independent director on the board of Taiwan Mobile, while the company's vice chairman, Richard Tsai Ming-hsing, sat on the 21-member NTU committee responsible for electing the university's president. The Ministry of Education also found that Kuan had served on Taiwan Mobile's board and its salary committee before the university approved his application to take up those positions. In March 2018, further allegations surfaced accusing Kuan of having illegally taught in China since 2005.

The ministry was accused of interfering in NTU's autonomy because of the delay, and a group of NTU professors, students, and alumni filed a complaint with the Taipei District Prosecutors' Office accusing Minister of Education Pan Wen-chung of nonfeasance. Pan resigned in April 2018 over the controversy surrounding his alleged interference in Kuan's appointment, and physicist Wu Maw-kuen was named to replace him. On 27 April 2018, the ministry rejected Kuan's appointment, citing a conflict of interest arising from his roles as an independent director and a member of the salary and auditing committees at Taiwan Mobile while he was a professor. NTU objected to the decision, stating that it had adhered to regulations throughout the election process. Wu said that Kuan had breached NTU regulations by failing to disclose his role as an independent director at Taiwan Mobile while Tsai was sitting on the election committee. Critics of the Democratic Progressive Party (DPP) government saw the ministry's move as politically motivated, as Kuan had associations with the Kuomintang (KMT). At a school affairs meeting on 12 May 2018, NTU urged the ministry to approve Kuan's election and to take legal action if necessary.

Yeh Jiunn-rong took office as minister of education in July 2018, after two of his predecessors had stepped down over the controversy. Yeh later required NTU to return to the stage of the selection process at which five candidates, including Kuan, remained and to vote again, but the selection committee declined to restart the selection. Wu Ruey-beei, a fellow NTU professor and candidate in the election, filed an administrative lawsuit against the ministry and NTU in September 2018, asking that the election be held again because of a potential conflict of interest. On 24 December 2018, Yeh announced that the ministry had approved Kuan's appointment. Yeh asked NTU to complete a review of the flaws and disputes that had surfaced during the election within three months and to report to the ministry on corrective measures. Yeh then resigned after announcing the decision. On 4 January 2019, the Taipei High Administrative Court rejected Wu Ruey-beei's application for an injunction to stop Kuan from taking office.

=== Inauguration and impeachment ===
Kuan took office as NTU's 12th president on 8 January 2019. But on 15 January 2019, the Control Yuan voted seven to four to impeach Kuan. The impeachment concerned opinion pieces that Kuan wrote under a pen name for Next Magazine while serving in the Cabinet as a minister without portfolio and as head of the National Development Council. In February 2019, the Control Yuan said that Kuan had earned at least NT$18 million from unreported work during the 15 years in which he held positions at Academia Sinica and NTU. On 2 September 2019, the Public Functionary Disciplinary Sanction Commission issued Kuan a reprimand, finding that he had received NT$675,000 in fees for the editorials in violation of the rule barring civil servants from holding second jobs.

On 23 October 2021, Kuan announced that he would not seek a second term, citing his age. On 7 October 2022, engineering dean Chen Wen-chang was elected as the university's next president after two rounds of voting. Kuan's term ended on 7 January 2023.

== Awards and honors ==
Kuan received the National Science Council's Distinguished Research Award in 1994 and 1996. He was awarded five-year Outstanding Scholarship Awards by Taiwan's Foundation for the Advancement of Outstanding Scholarship in 1997 and 2002. In 1999, he received the Ministry of Education's 43rd Academic Award in the social sciences. Kuan was elected an academician of Academia Sinica in the Division of Humanities and Social Sciences in 2002. In 2014, he was elected a fellow of The World Academy of Sciences in the social and economic sciences. Kuan was subsequently awarded a National Chair Professorship by Taiwan's Ministry of Education in 2018.

In 2020, Kuan received the Taiwan Economic Association's Outstanding Contribution to Economics Award in recognition of his contributions to econometric research. He was also named a fellow of the Journal of Econometrics in 2020.
