= John Deng =

Taiwanese politician (born 1952)

Deng Chen-chung
- 鄧振中
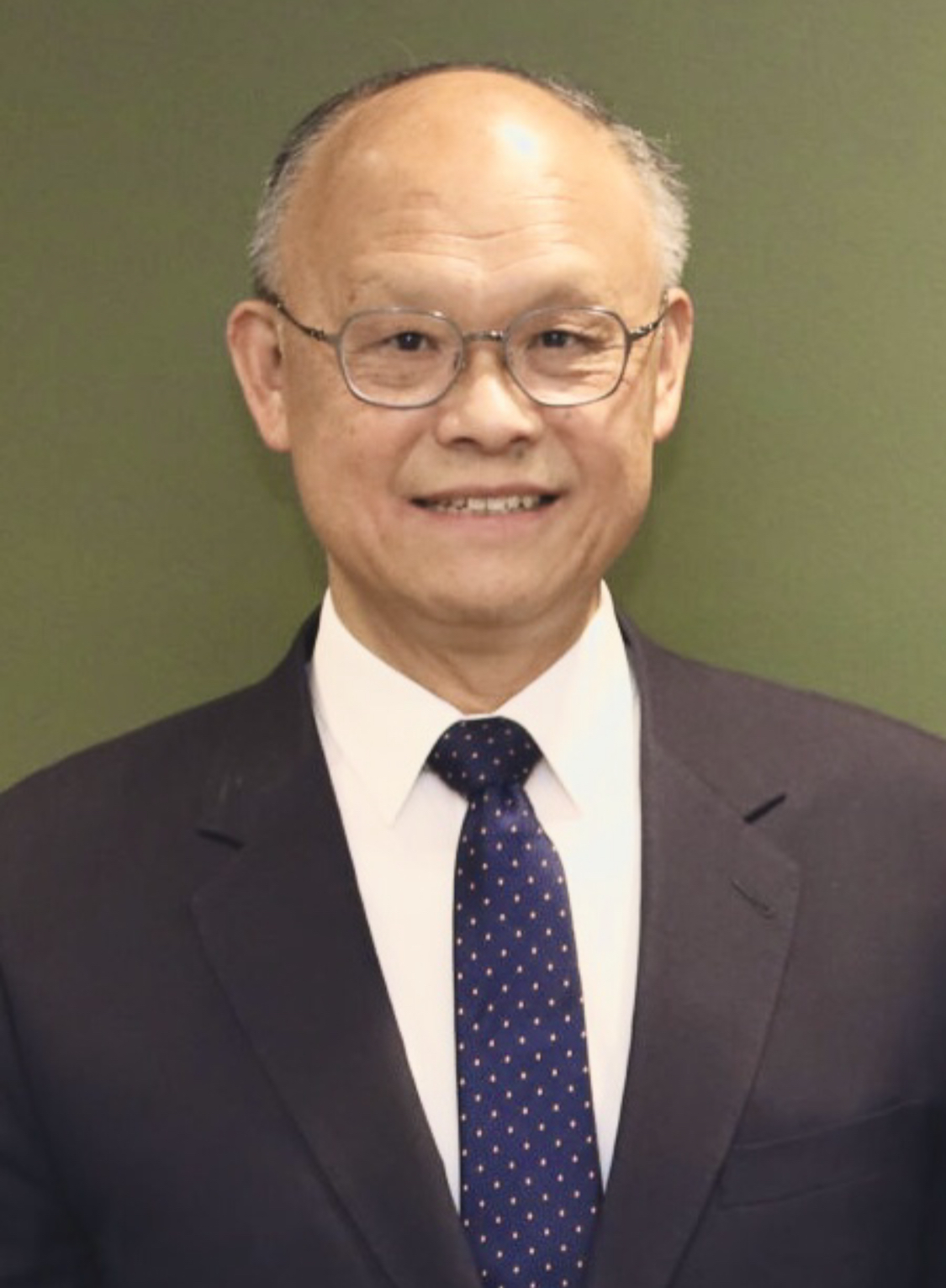
- Official portrait, 2023

Minister without Portfolio of the Office of Trade Negotiations
- In office 9 August 2016 – 20 May 2024
- Premier: Lin Chuan; William Lai; Su Tseng-chang; Chen Chien-jen
- Preceded by: Shih Jun-ji
- In office 3 March 2014 – 7 December 2014
- Premier: Jiang Yi-huah
- Preceded by: Schive Chi
- Succeeded by: Woody Duh

Minister of Economic Affairs
- In office 8 December 2014 – 20 May 2016
- Prime Minister: Mao Chi-kuo; Simon Chang
- Deputy: Cho Shih-chao
- Preceded by: Woody Duh
- Succeeded by: Chih-Kung Lee

Governor of Fujian Province
- In office 25 March 2014 – 7 December 2014
- Premier: Jiang Yi-huah
- Preceded by: Schive Chi
- Succeeded by: Woody Duh

Deputy Secretary-General of the National Security Council
- In office 25 November 2009 – 2 March 2014
- Secretary-General: Su Chi; Hu Wei-chen; Jason Yuan
- Preceded by: Kao Chang
- Succeeded by: Liu Da-nien

Political Deputy Minister of Economic Affairs
- In office 20 May 2008 – 24 November 2009
- Minister: Yiin Chii-ming

Deputy Representative of Taiwan to United States
- In office 2006–2007
- Representative: David Lee

Deputy Minister of Mainland Affairs Council
- In office 20 May 2000 – 5 March 2002
- Minister: Tsai Ing-wen

Personal details
- Born: 29 July 1952 (age 74) Sanxing, Yilan, Taiwan
- Party: Independent
- Education: Soochow University (LLB); George Washington University (LLM)

Deng Chen-chung (traditional Chinese: 鄧振中; simplified Chinese: 邓振中; pinyin: Dèng Zhènzhōng; born 29 July 1952), also known by his English name John Deng, is a Taiwanese lawyer. He is currently a minister without portfolio in charge of the Office of Trade Negotiations. He was the Minister of Economic Affairs since 8 December 2014 until 20 May 2016.

== Early life and education ==
Deng obtained his bachelor's degree in law from Soochow University, and his master's degree in law from George Washington University in the United States.

== Economic affairs ministry ==
=== Ministry appointment ===
Upon his appointment to the position of Minister of Ministry of Economic Affairs on 5 December 2014, Deng laid out goals he would work towards during his appointed ministerial term. He said that he would strive to boost the competitiveness of Taiwan's industries, explore the mainland Chinese and international markets and improve the lives of the Taiwanese people. He added that clear objectives were needed to boost Taiwan's competitiveness, which included better promoting Taiwan's product in Mainland China and elsewhere, thus he would push the ministry for free trade deals with other countries.

=== Electricity conservation ===
In July 2015, Deng called on public and business sectors to conserve electricity when reserved capacity reached to a level of only 670 MW.

== Second term as minister without portfolio ==
Tsai Ing-wen named Deng minister without portfolio in charge of the Office of Trade Negotiations in August 2016.
