= J.W. Kuo =

Taiwanese business executive and politician (born 1953)

Kuo Jyh-huei
- 郭智輝
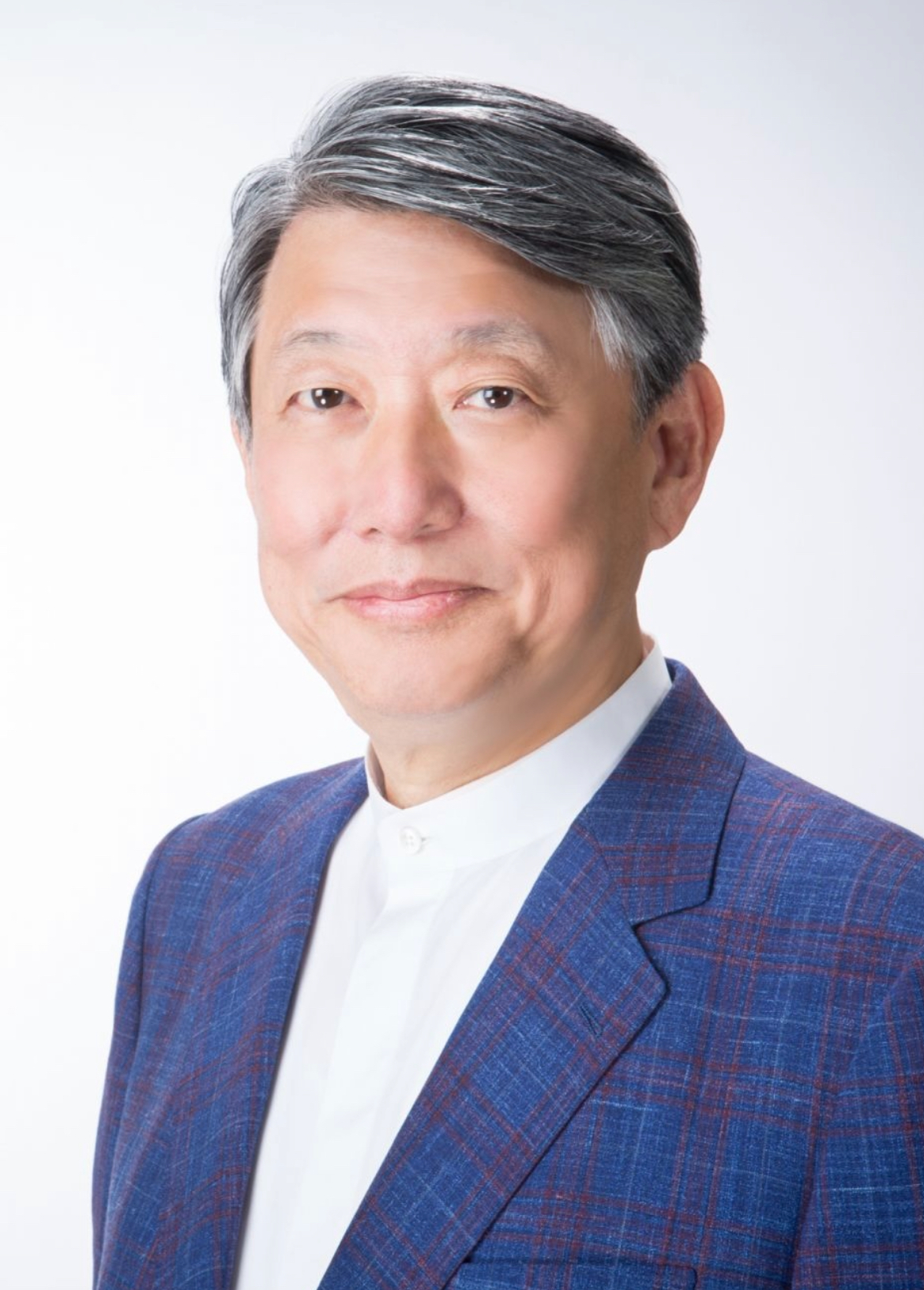
- Official portrait, 2024

36th Minister of Economic Affairs
- In office 20 May 2024 – 1 September 2025
- Premier: Cho Jung-tai
- Preceded by: Wang Mei-hua
- Succeeded by: Kung Ming-hsin

Personal details
- Born: 7 February 1953 (age 73) Pingtung County, Taiwan
- Party: Independent
- Education: Cheng Shiu University (BA); National Taipei University (MBA, PhD)

Kuo Jyh-huei (Chinese: 郭智輝; pinyin: Guō Zhìhuī; born 7 February 1953) is a Taiwanese business executive and politician who served as Taiwan's Minister of Economic Affairs from April 2024 to August 2025.

== Early life and education ==
Kuo was born in Pingtung County. In his first sales job after completing military service, Kuo learned Japanese in two years, and later worked for Terry Gou as an interpreter and driver. Kuo has served as chairman of TeaLa, and co-founded TOPCO Scientific Company.

After graduating from Cheng Shiu University, Kuo earned a Master of Business Administration (M.B.A.) in 2001 and his Ph.D. in business administration from National Taipei University in 2006. His doctoral dissertation was titled, "An empirical study on the impact of senior managers' psychological distance, background, and organizational isomorphism on the timing of corporate investment in China: A case study of Taiwan's electronic information industry" (Chinese: 高階管理者心理距離、背景及組織同形化對企業投資中國時點的實證研究—以我國電子資訊產業為例).

== Political career ==
On 16 April 2024, Kuo was appointed Minister of Economic Affairs in Cho Jung-tai's incoming cabinet, succeeding Wang Mei-hua in the role. Legislators from the Kuomintang panned the selection of Kuo as economic minister, drawing attention to his 2005 conviction of violating the Securities and Exchange Act, TOPCO Group's investments and business registrations in mainland China, and his reneging on a "promise to become involved" in the Chinese Professional Baseball League.

In May 2024, Kuo announced to an ICT industry group plans for the Lai administration to open overseas science parks in countries where Taiwanese businesses have made major investments, including the United States, Mexico, and Japan. Kuo later signed an economic development statement of intent with Texas governor Greg Abbott in July 2024 and oversaw the opening of a State of Texas economic office in Taipei.

In July 2024, Kuo raised concerns about the reliability of Taiwan's electric power grid, claiming that, due to the increased power consumption from artificial intelligence data centers, the country would face electric shortages from 2025 to 2028, potentially leading to blackouts.

Kuo resigned as Minister of Economic Affairs on 22 August 2025 citing the impact of the job on his health. He was succeeded by Kung Ming-hsin.

In 2026, Kuo served on the Taiwan–Japan Relations Association. That year, he was also considered for the presidency of the Chinese Taipei Baseball Association, a position that went to Chou Ling-wen.

Political offices
Preceded by Wang Mei-hua	Minister of Economic Affairs of Taiwan; 2024–2025	Succeeded by Kung Ming-hsin
