= Francis C. Moon =

American mechanical engineer (born 1939)

Francis Charles Moon (born 1939) is an American mechanical engineer.

Moon earned his bachelor's and master's degrees in mechanical engineering from the Pratt Institute in 1962 and 1964, respectively, then completed his doctoral studies at Cornell University. He later joined Cornell's faculty, succeeding Yih-Hsing Pao as chair of the Department of Theoretical and Applied Mechanics from 1980 to 1987, then serving as director of Sibley School of Mechanical and Aerospace Engineering at Cornell University until 1992. Moon was also Joseph C. Ford Professor of Engineering, and was awarded emeritus status upon retirement.

Moon was honored with the 2011 Robert Henry Thurston Lecture Award from the American Society of Mechanical Engineers. He was elected a member of the United States National Academy of Engineering in 1996, "[f]or experimental research in chaotic and nonlinear dynamics and development of superconducting levitation devices."

== Selected books ==
- Moon, Francis C. (2004) [1987]. Chaotic Vibrations: An Introduction for Applied Scientists and Engineers. Wiley. Bibcode:1987nsf..rept.....M. doi:10.1002/3527602844. ISBN 9780471856856.
- Moon, Francis C. (1992). Chaotic and Fractal Dynamics: Introduction for Applied Scientists and Engineers. Wiley. ISBN 9780471545712.
- Moon, Francis C. (2007) [1994]. Superconducting Levitation: Applications to Bearings and Magnetic Transportation. Wiley. Bibcode:1994slab.book.....M. ISBN 978-3-527-61752-4.
- Moon, Francis C. (1997). Dynamics and Chaos in Manufacturing Processes. Wiley. ISBN 9780471152934.
- Moon, Francis C. (2007). The Machines of Leonardo Da Vinci and Franz Reuleaux Kinematics of Machines from the Renaissance to the 20th Century. History of Mechanism and Machine Science. Vol. 2. Springer. doi:10.1007/978-1-4020-5599-7. ISBN 978-1-4020-5598-0.
