= Yang Wei-fuu =

Taiwanese politician

- 楊偉甫

Vice Minister of Economic Affairs
- In office January 2015 – April 2019
- Minister: John Deng; Lee Chih-kung
- Deputy: Shen Jong-chin
- Succeeded by: Lin Chuan-neng

Personal details
- Born: 1952 (age 73–74)
- Education: National Chung Hsing University (BS); Colorado State University (MS)

Yang Wei-fuu (Chinese: 楊偉甫; pinyin: Yáng Wěifǔ; born 1952) is a Taiwanese politician, who has been the Vice Minister of Economic Affairs of Taiwan since January 2015.

== Education ==
Yang earned his bachelor's degree in civil engineering from National Chung Hsing University and master's degree in the same field from Colorado State University in the United States.

== Early careers ==
Yang was the Director General of Water Resources Agency (WRA), Director of WRA Central Regional Water Resources Office, WRA Deputy Chief Engineer and WRA section chief.
