= Yiin Chii-ming =

Taiwanese politician

- 尹啟銘
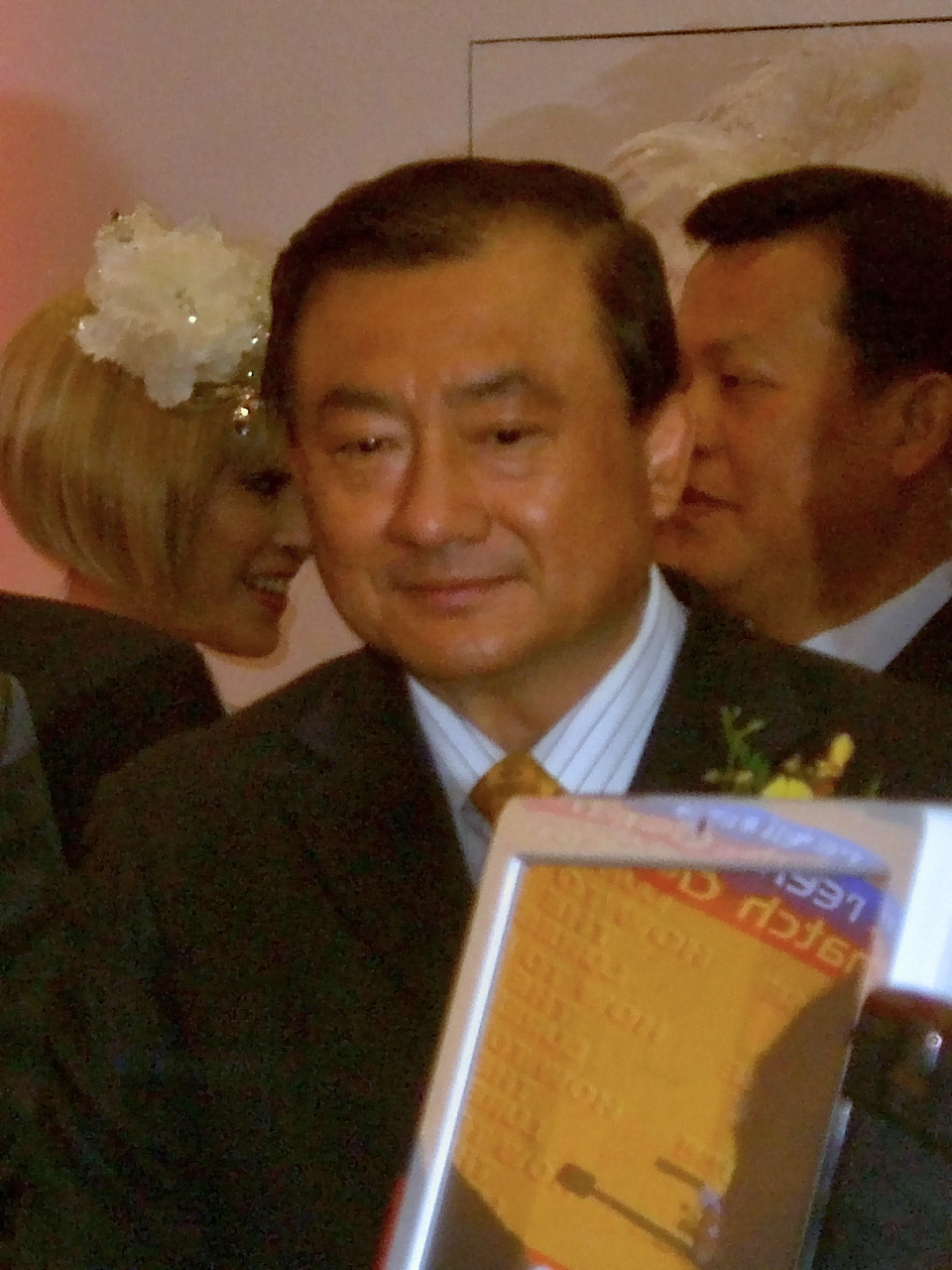

Minister without Portfolio of the Executive Yuan
- In office 20 May 2012 – 17 February 2013

Minister of Council for Economic Planning and Development of the Republic of China
- In office 6 February 2012 – 17 February 2013
- Deputy: Chen Hsiao-hung
- Preceded by: Christina Liu
- Succeeded by: Kuan Chung-ming

Minister without Portfolio of the Executive Yuan
- In office 16 November 2009 – 2 December 2011

Minister of Economic Affairs of the Republic of China
- In office 2008–2009
- Deputy: John Deng
- Preceded by: Steve Chen
- Succeeded by: Shih Yen-shiang

Administrative Deputy Minister of Economic Affairs of the Republic of China
- In office 1997–2005
- Minister: Wang Chih-kang; Lin Hsin-yi; Christine Tsung; Lin Yi-fu; Ho Mei-yueh
- Succeeded by: Hou Ho-shong

Personal details
- Born: 2 June 1952 (age 74) Tainan, Taiwan
- Party: Kuomintang
- Education: National Chiao Tung University (BS, MS); National Chengchi University (PhD)

Yiin Chii-ming (Chinese: 尹啟銘; pinyin: Yǐn Qǐmíng; born 2 June 1952) is a Taiwanese politician. He was the Minister of the Council for Economic Planning and Development (CEPD) of the Executive Yuan from 2012 to 2013.

== Education ==
Yiin graduated from National Chiao Tung University with a bachelor's degree in computer science and control engineering in 1974 and a master's degree in management science in 1978. He then earned his Ph.D. in business administration from National Chengchi University in 1989. His doctoral dissertation was titled, "The relationship between product innovation freedom, corporate strategy and technology policy: An empirical study of Taiwan's information electronics industry" (Chinese: 產品創新自由度、企業策略與技術政策之關係－以台灣資訊電子業實證研究－).

== Personal life ==
Yiin is married with one son and one daughter.
