= Shen Jong-chin =

Politician from Taiwan

- 沈榮津
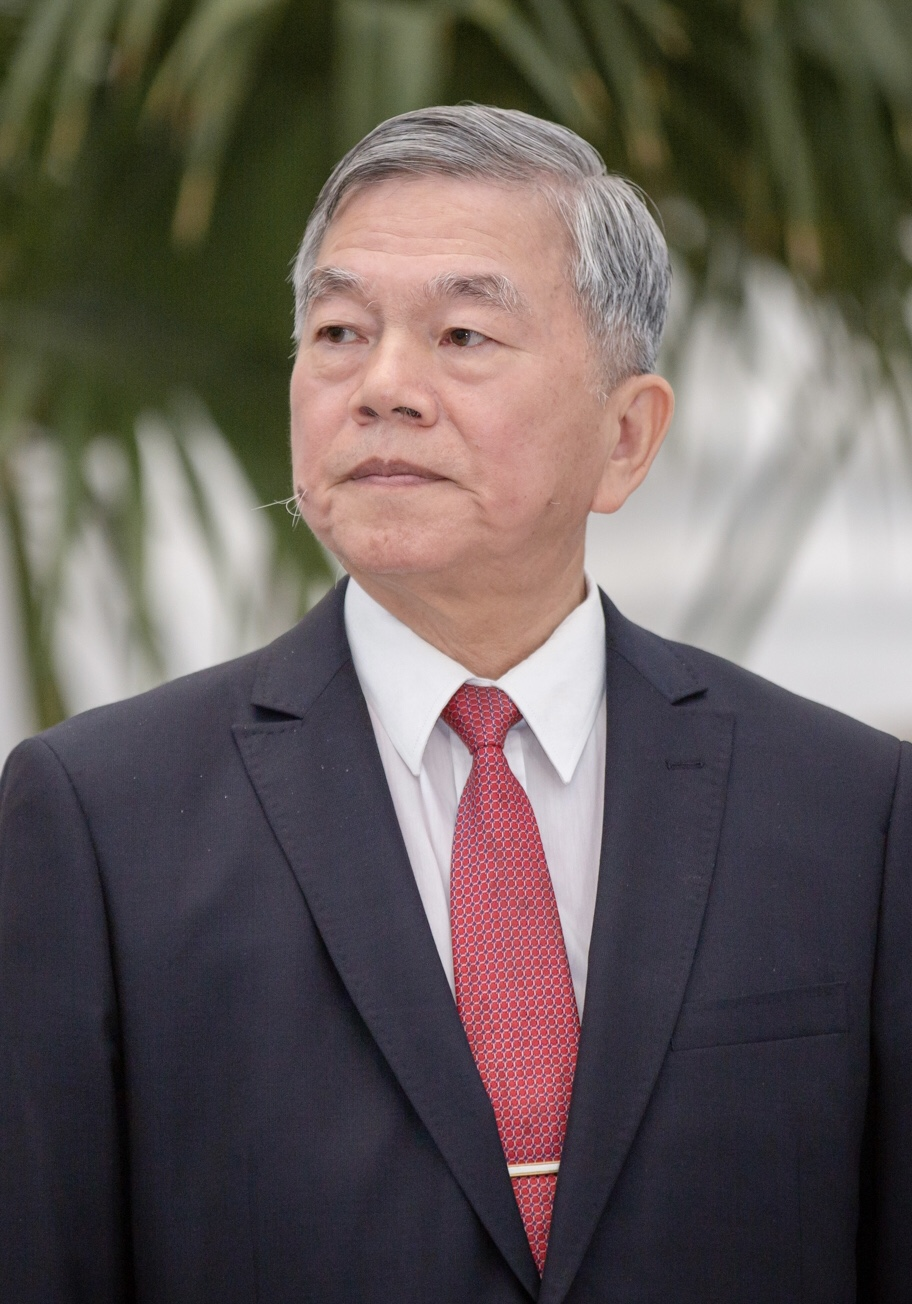
- Official portrait, 2020

Senior Advisor to the President
- Incumbent
- Assumed office 3 February 2023
- President: Tsai Ing-wen; Lai Ching-te

Chairman of the Taiwan Financial Holdings Group
- Incumbent
- Assumed office 3 February 2023
- Preceded by: Joseph Lyu

38th Vice Premier of Taiwan
- In office 19 June 2020 – 30 January 2023
- Premier: Su Tseng-chang
- Preceded by: Chen Chi-mai
- Succeeded by: Cheng Wen-tsan

34th Minister of Economic Affairs
- In office 8 September 2017 – 19 June 2020; Acting: 16 August 2017 – 8 September 2017
- Premier: Lin Chuan; Lai Ching-te; Su Tseng-chang
- Preceded by: Lee Chih-kung
- Succeeded by: Wang Mei-hua
Deputy ministerial offices
Administrative Deputy Minister of Economic Affairs
In office 20 May 2016 – 15 August 2017
Minister	Lee Chih-kung
Vice	Yang Wei-fuu
Succeeded by	Kung Ming-hsin
Vice Minister of Economic Affairs
In office February 2014 – 20 May 2016
Minister	Chang Chia-juch; Woody Duh
Deputy	See list: Woody Duh Cho Shih-chao
Preceded by	Woody Duh
Succeeded by

Personal details
- Born: July 27, 1951 (age 74) Sinying, Tainan, Taiwan
- Party: Independent
- Education: Provincial Taipei Institute of Technology (BS); National Taipei University of Technology (MS)

Shen Jong-chin (traditional Chinese: 沈榮津; simplified Chinese: 沈荣津; pinyin: Shěn Róngjīn; Pe̍h-ōe-jī: Sím Êng-tin; born 1951) is a Taiwanese politician who served as the vice premier of the Republic of China (Taiwan) from 2020 to 2023.

== Education ==
Shen obtained his bachelor's degree in electrical engineering from Provincial Taipei Institute of Technology and master's degree in commerce automation and management from National Taipei University of Technology.

== Political career ==
Shen led the Export Processing Zone Administration prior to heading the Industrial Development Bureau in 2012, succeeding Woody Duh. Shen became vice minister of economic affairs in 2014, again replacing Duh. He took office as deputy minister of economic affairs on 20 May 2016, with the Lin Chuan cabinet. He served as acting minister following the resignation of Lee Chih-kung in August 2017, and was retained by premier Lai Ching-te.

=== Anti-China movement in Vietnam ===
Responding to the destruction of Taiwanese companies operating in Vietnam due to the anti-China movement because of the China National Offshore Oil Corporation oil exploration in the disputed territories in South China Sea, Shen led a delegation to Vietnam to assist Taiwanese business people in the country in mid May 2014. They visited Bình Dương and Đồng Nai Provinces. The riot led to the damage of 224 Taiwanese companies and suspension of 1,100 Taiwanese enterprises.

=== Vice premiership ===
On 19 June 2020, Shen was appointed vice premier, succeeding Chen Chi-mai, who had resigned to contest in the 2020 Kaohsiung mayoral by-election.

Political offices
Preceded by Lee Chih-kung	Minister of Economic Affairs; 2017–2020	Succeeded by Wang Mei-hua
Preceded by Chen Chi-mai	Vice Premier of the Republic of China; 2020–2023	Succeeded by Cheng Wen-tsan
