= Shih Yen-shiang =

Taiwanese chemist and chemical engineer

- 施顏祥
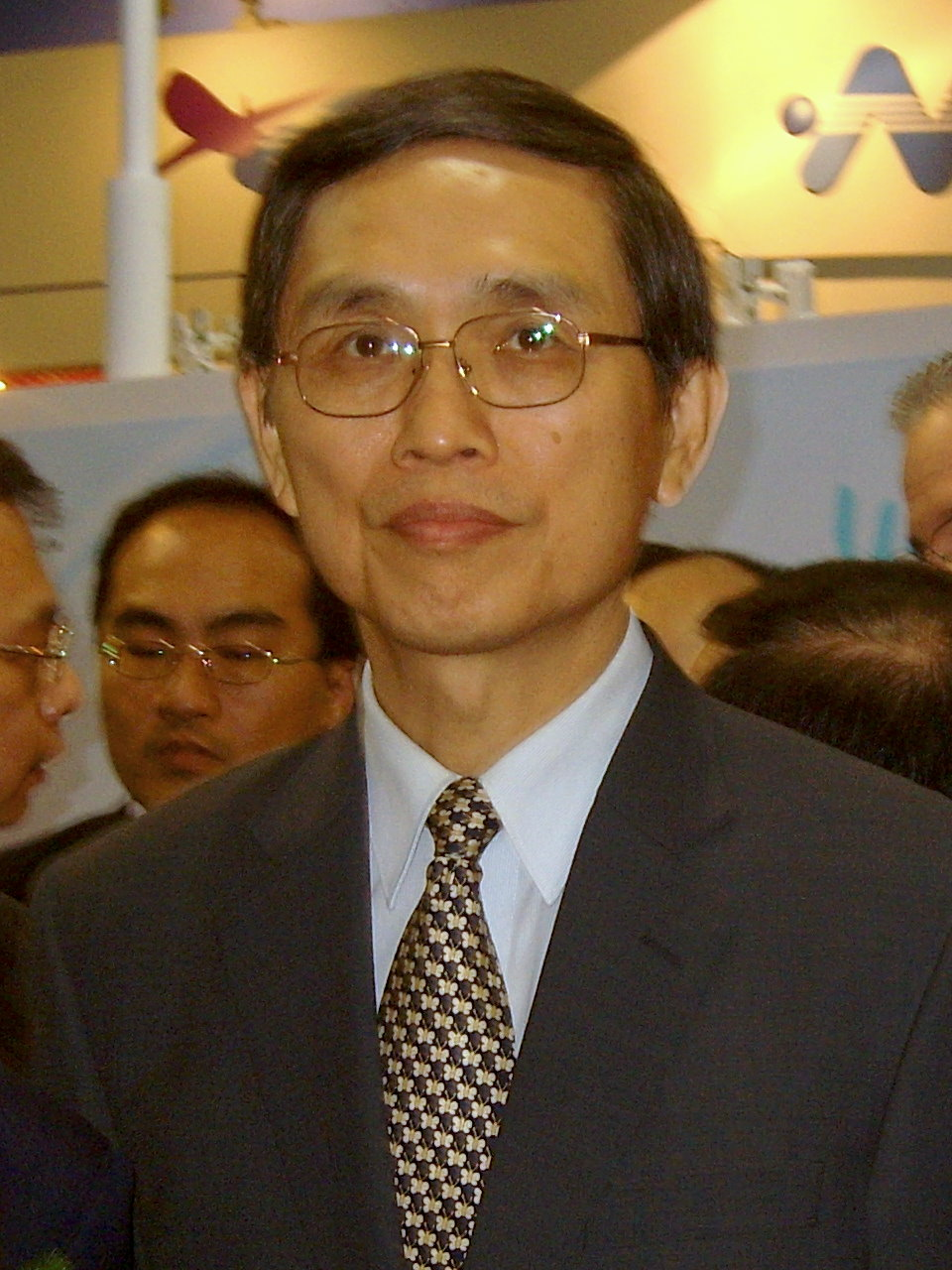

Minister of Economic Affairs of Taiwan
- In office 10 September 2009 – 17 February 2013
- Vice: Francis Liang
- Preceded by: Yiin Chii-ming
- Succeeded by: Chang Chia-juch

Personal details
- Born: 24 March 1950 (age 76) Taichung, Taiwan
- Education: National Taiwan University (BS); University of Kansas (MS); Massachusetts Institute of Technology (MS, PhD)

Shih Yen-shiang (Chinese: 施顏祥; pinyin: Shī Yánxiáng; born 24 March 1950) is a Taiwanese chemist and chemical engineer. He was the Minister of Economic Affairs from 2009 to 2013.

== Early life and education ==
Shih was born in Taichung on March 24, 1950. He graduated from National Taiwan University with a Bachelor of Science (B.S.) in chemistry in 1972, then completed graduate and doctoral studies in the United States. He earned a Master of Science (M.S.) in chemistry from the University of Kansas in 1975, then a second M.S. and his Ph.D. in 1979 from the Massachusetts Institute of Technology (MIT) in chemical engineering.
