= Chien Shih-Liang =

Chinese-born Taiwanese chemist (1908–1983)

- 錢思亮
- Born: 1908; Hangzhou, Zhejiang, China
- Died: 15 September 1983 (aged 74–75); Taipei, Taiwan
- Education: Tsinghua University (BS); University of Illinois at Urbana Champaign (MS, PhD)
- Occupation: Chemist
- Children: Robert Chien; Shu Chien; Fredrick Chien
- Relatives: Carl Chien (grandson)

Chien Shih-Liang aka S. L. Chien (Chinese: 錢思亮; pinyin: Qián Sīliàng; 1908–1983), was a Taiwanese chemist who served as the President of the Academia Sinica. A graduate of Tsinghua University and the University of Illinois Urbana-Champaign, he also served as President of National Taiwan University.

== Biography ==
Chien was from Hangzhou, Zhejiang. After graduating from Tianjin Nankai High School, he matriculated at Tsinghua University Department of Chemistry in 1927. He won the Boxer Indemnity Scholarship Program in 1931 and went to the United States together with Wu Ta-You. Chien continued his study in chemistry at the University of Illinois Urbana-Champaign (UIUC) where he obtained a M.S. in 1932 and Ph.D. in 1934.

Chien returned to China after obtaining PhD and joined the Peking University Department of Chemistry. Chien was a professor and the head of the department.

In 1949, Chien went to Taipei, and was recruited professor of chemistry and the provost of the National Taiwan University, by its then-president Fu Sinian. From 1951 until 1970, Chien was the President of the National Taiwan University.

In 1964, Chien was elected Academician of the Academia Sinica division of physical and mathematical sciences. From 1970 to 1983, Chien served the President of Academia Sinica. In 1983, Chien received honorary doctoral degree from his alma mater University of Illinois Urbana-Champaign.

From 1971 to 1981, Chien also served the director of the Atomic Energy Council of the Executive Yuan.

In 2016, Chien was honored with a postal stamp in his likeness by Chunghwa Post, the national postal service of Taiwan.

== Family ==
Chien's father Chien Hong-ye (錢鴻業) was a Chief Justice in the Supreme Court of the Republic of China, and was assassinated in Shanghai in 1940. Chien had three sons. The eldest, Robert Chien and youngest, Fredrick Chien, became politicians. His second son Shu Chien is a biologist and engineer. A grandson, Carl Chien, is a businessman.

Academic offices
Preceded by Shen Kang-po (acting)	President of the National Taiwan University; 1951–1970	Succeeded by Yen Chen-hsing
Preceded by Wang Shijie	President of Academia Sinica; 1970–1983	Succeeded by Wu Ta-You
