= Shirley Kuo =

Taiwanese economist

Kuo Wang-jung
- 郭婉容

Minister of Finance
- In office 22 July 1988 – 1 June 1990
- Preceded by: Robert Chien
- Succeeded by: Wang Chien-shien

Minister of Council for Economic Planning and Development
- In office 1 June 1990 – 27 February 1993
- Preceded by: Fredrick Chien
- Succeeded by: Vincent Siew

Personal details
- Born: 25 January 1930 (age 96) Tainan Prefecture, Taiwan, Empire of Japan
- Party: Kuomintang
- Spouse(s): Liu Ching-jui (m. 1949; died 1961) Ni Wenya (m. 1968; died 2006)
- Children: Christina Liu
- Education: National Taiwan University (BS); Massachusetts Institute of Technology (MS); Kobe University (PhD)

Kuo Wang-jung (Chinese: 郭婉容; pinyin: Guo Wǎnróng; born 25 January 1930), also known by her English name Shirley Kuo, is a Taiwanese economist.

== Education ==
After graduating from National Tainan Girls' Senior High School, Kuo studied economics as an undergraduate at National Taiwan University and received her bachelor's degree in 1952. She then went to the United States and earned a Master of Science (M.S.) from the Massachusetts Institute of Technology (MIT) in 1960. In 1984, she completed doctoral studies in Japan, earning her Ph.D. in economics from Kobe University.

== Career ==
Upon her appointment to the Ministry of Finance, Kuo became the first female cabinet minister in the history of the Republic of China. She led the ministry from 1988 to 1990, before being named the head minister of the Council for Economic Planning and Development, a position she held until 1993.

She was married to Ni Wen-ya until his death in 2006. A daughter from her first marriage, Christina Liu, was finance minister in 2012. Peng Ming-min is her first cousin.
