= Mark Caltonhill =

British translator and writer

Mark Caltonhill is a British translator and writer. He is the author of "Private Prayers and Public Parades - Exploring the Religious Life of Taipei".

== Career ==
Caltonhill, who studied first botany and later Chinese, both at the University of Edinburgh, is a writer and performer, currently based in Taiwan, R.O.C.

Caltonhill is a frequent contributor to Taiwan's English-language newspapers (Taipei Times, Taiwan News, China Post), for the last he has been both a columnist, writing under the byline Jonathan Wardle a weekly column "View from the Hill" covering various cultural topics, and an unnamed leader writer, covering politics and current affairs. He also writes for magazines such as Amcham's "Topics", Taipei City Government's "Discover Taipei", Tourism Bureau's "Travel In Taiwan" and various Government Information Office publications. His English-language book "Private Prayers and Public Parades - Exploring the Religious Life of Taipei" was published in 2002 by the Department of Information, Taipei City Government. Subsequent publications cover museums and tourism, and a collection of poems and short fiction (see bibliography).

Caltonhill earlier worked as a comedian/juggler in Europe and Taiwan, appearing in Leofoo and other theme parks and on television. Since 2010 he has resumed his performance career, presenting stand up and comedy poetry, and most recently comedy songs. As a performer he is known as Mark Malarkey (English-language shows) and Hushuo Make (胡說馬克) (Chinese-language shows).

== Bibliography ==
- Private Prayers and Public Parades - Exploring the Religious Life of Taipei Caltonhill, Mark (2002). Private Prayers and Public Parades - Exploring the Religious Life of Taipei. Department of Information, Taipei City Government. ISBN 957-01-3260-4.
- Taipei Taipei Epiphanies : Exploring Taipei's Museums and Their Surrounding Cultural Hotspots, 2006, Co-writer
- Malarkey's Amusement Park, 2008, Jiyue Publications, (poems and short fiction)
- Michelin Green Guide—Taiwan, 2011, Co-writer
