= Fredrick Chien =

Taiwanese diplomat and politician (born 1935)

Chien Foo
- 錢復
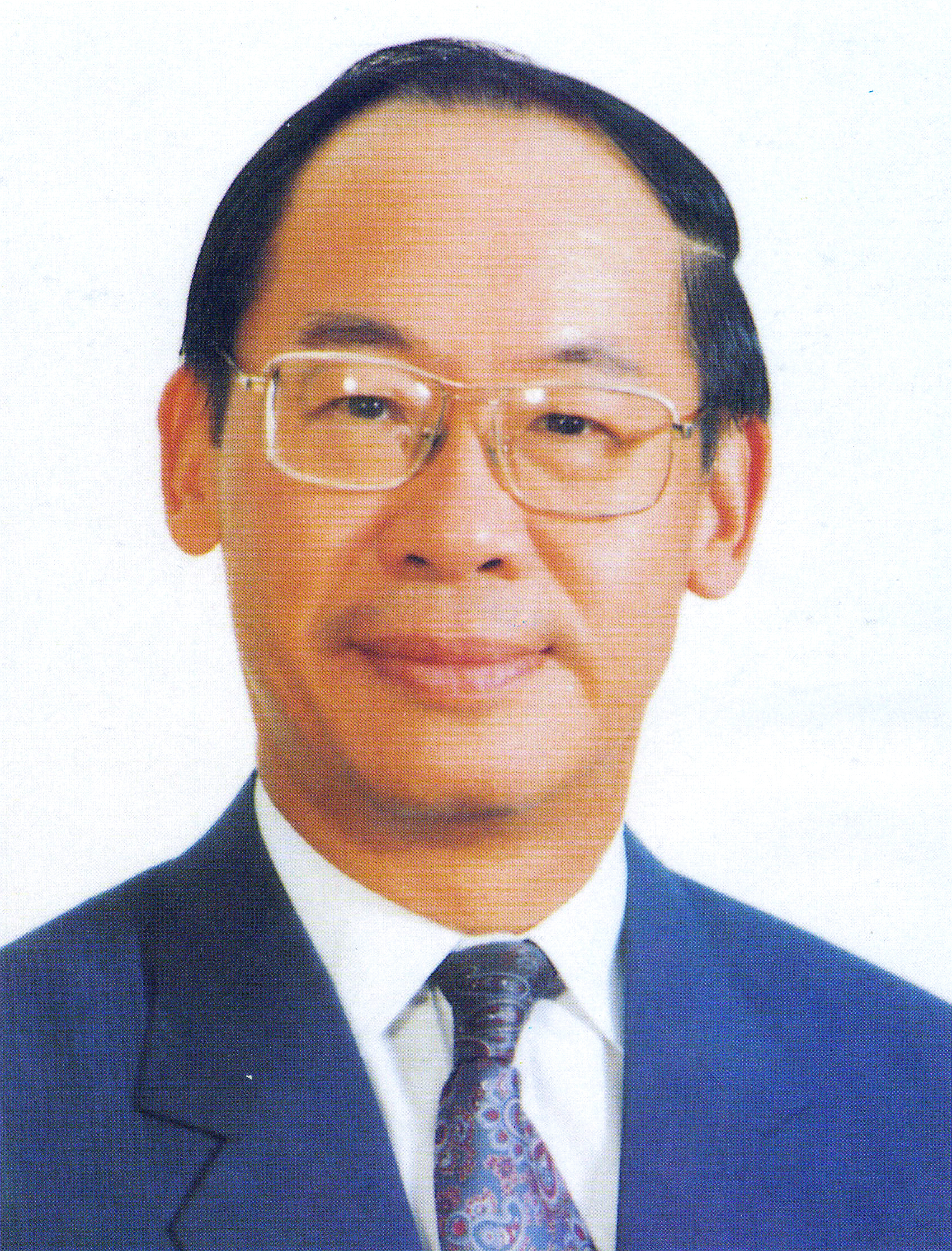
- Official portrait, 1997

President of Control Yuan
- In office 1 February 1999 – 1 February 2005
- Preceded by: Wang Tso-yung
- Succeeded by: Wang Chien-shien (2008)

Speaker of the National Assembly
- In office 8 July 1996 – 13 January 1999
- Preceded by: Title Established
- Succeeded by: Su Nan-cheng

Minister of Foreign Affairs of the Republic of China
- In office 1 June 1990 – 10 June 1996
- Vice: Stephen S. F. Chen
- Preceded by: Lien Chan
- Succeeded by: John Chiang

Chairman of the Council for Economic Planning and Development
- In office 22 July 1988 – 1 June 1990
- Preceded by: Chao Yao-tung
- Succeeded by: Shirley Kuo

Minister without Portfolio of the Executive Yuan
- In office 22 July 1988 – 1 June 1990
- Premier: Yu Kuo-hwa; Lee Huan

ROC Representative to the United States
- In office 19 November 1982 – 20 July 1988
- Preceded by: Cai Weiping
- Succeeded by: Ting Mao-shih

Director-General of the Government Information Office
- In office 1 June 1972 – 19 May 1975
- Preceded by: James Wei
- Succeeded by: Ting Mao-shih

Personal details
- Born: 21 March 1935 (age 91) Beijing, Republic of China
- Party: Kuomintang
- Spouse: Julie Tien (m. 1963)
- Children: Carl; Carol
- Parents: Chien Shih-Liang (father); Chang Wan-tu (mother)
- Relatives: Robert Chien, Shu Chien (brothers); Chien Hong-ye (grandfather)
- Education: National Taiwan University (BA); Yale University (MA, PhD)
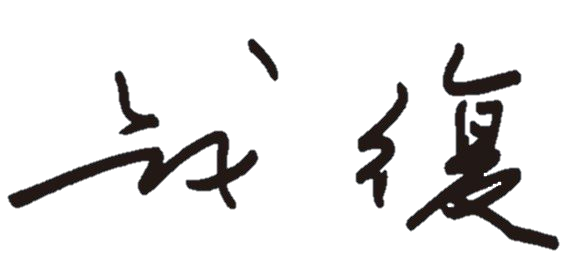
- Signature

Military service
- Allegiance: Republic of China
- Branch/service: Republic of China Army
- Years of service: 1956–1958

Chinese name
- Traditional Chinese: 錢復
- Simplified Chinese: 钱复
Transcriptions
Standard Mandarin
- Hanyu Pinyin: Qián Fù
- Bopomofo: ㄑㄧㄢˊㄧㄈㄨˋ

Chien Foo (Chinese: 錢復; born 21 March 1935), also known by his English name Fredrick Foo Chien, is a Taiwanese diplomat and politician who served as the president of the Control Yuan from 1999 to 2005. After earning his doctorate from Yale University, he assumed a series of governmental positions including Director-General of the Government Information Office from 1972 to 1975, Republic of China Representative to the United States from 1982 to 1988, Chairman of the Council for Economic Planning and Development from 1988 to 1990, and Minister of Foreign Affairs from 1990 to 1996. He was also the Speaker of the National Assembly between 1996 and 1999.

== Early life and family ==
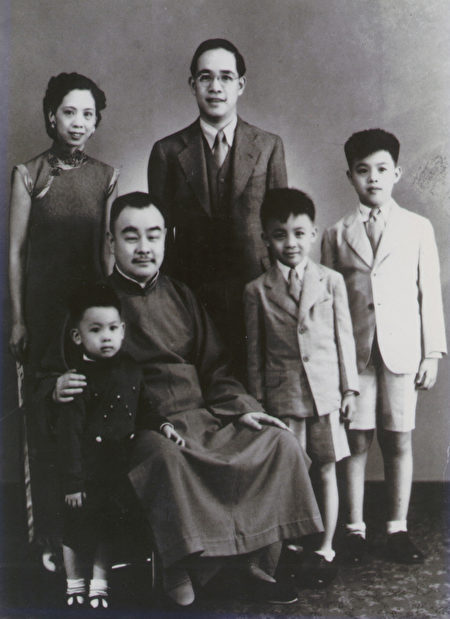
Chien poses for a family photo in Shanghai, 1939

Chuen was born in Peking's Shou Shan Hospital, a hospital of the Peking Union Medical College, on March 21, 1935 (February 17 on the lunar calendar). His family's ancestral home was Hangzhou, Zhejiang. Chien's paternal grandfather, Chien Hong-Yeh, was a Chief Judge of the Criminal Court in Shanghai. Chien's father, Chien Shih-Liang, was a chemist and educator, and the former President of the National Taiwan University and Academia Sinica. Chien's mother was Chang Wan-tu.

In the fall of 1937, at the age of two, as the Second Sino-Japanese War broke out, his family moved to Shanghai to live with his paternal grandfather. His grandfather was assassinated during the Wang Jingwei regime in July 1940 after refusing to go along with a Japanese attempt to control the court system. After the war ended, his family moved back to Peking, where his father became the chair of Peking University's Chemistry Department at the invitation of President Fu Ssu-nien. With the Chinese Civil War, his family moved to Shanghai in mid-January 1949 and then to Taiwan with the Nationalist Government in mid-February.

=== Education ===
In Taiwan, Chien was a student at Jianguo High School, where he graduated in 1952. He attended National Taiwan University as an undergraduate, graduating in 1956 with a bachelor's degree with honors in political science. During his time at the National Taiwan University, he was elected as the president of the student government and held the first Model United Nations conference in Taiwan. He also joined the China Youth Corps, where he visited Turkey and Spain in 1955. Chien passed the foreign service examination in 1956.

After completing his conscription, he pursued advanced studies in the United States, first earning an M.A. degree from Yale University in New Haven, Connecticut, in 1959 and then a Ph.D. in international relations from Yale in 1962. His thesis examined Qing dynasty diplomacy toward Joseon Korea during the late 19th century, covering the period from 1876 to 1885.

Chen was engaged to Julie Tien on September 16, 1961, with Madame Hu Shih presiding over the ceremony in New York. On September 22, 1963, the couple were married at Taipei's Armed Forces Officers Club with Wang Yun-wu officiating their marriage.

== Early career ==
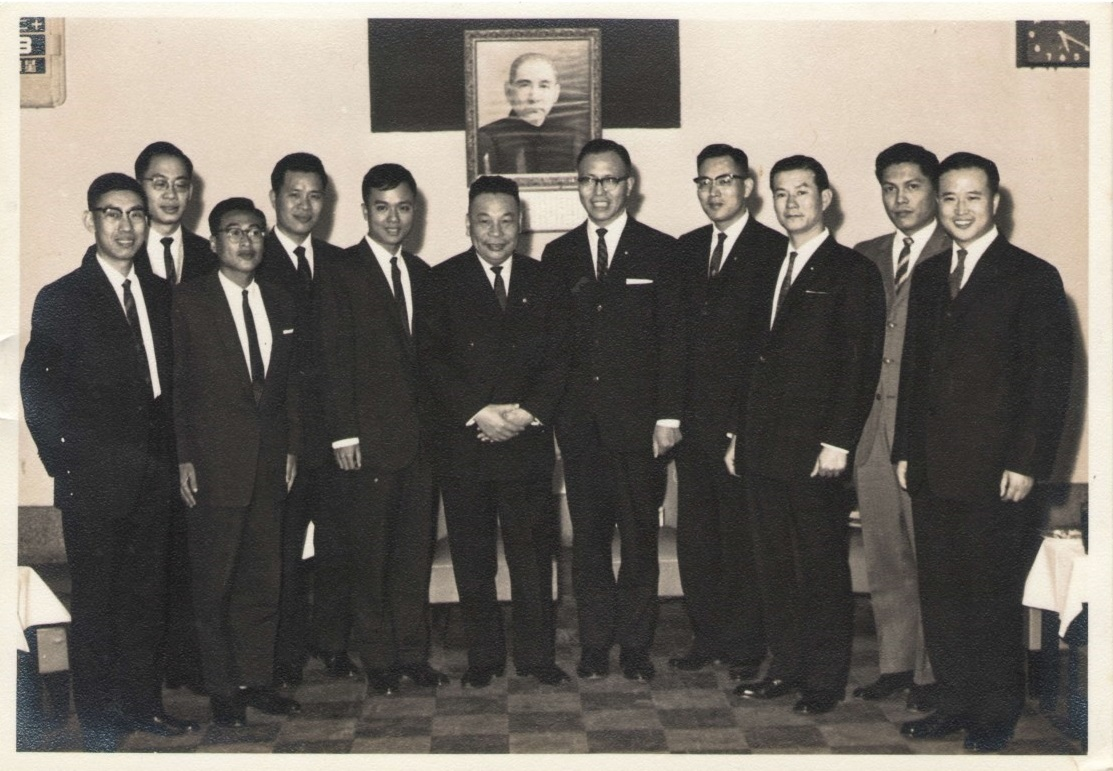
Recipients of the 1st Annual Ten Outstanding Young Persons Award poses with Chiang Ching-kuo in 1963

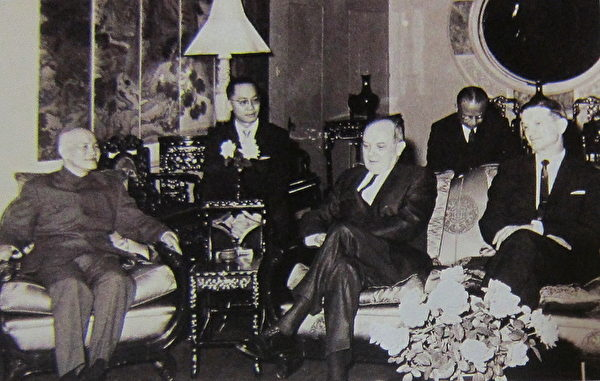
Chien (back) interprets for President Chiang Kai-shek during a meeting with US Secretary of State Dean Rusk, December 08, 1966

Upon returning to Taiwan in 1961, Chien interned at the Ministry of Foreign Affairs for three months and subsequently joined the Ministry in early 1962. Within months, he transferred to the Executive Yuan, as a secretary and the English interpreter for Premier and Vice President Chen Cheng. Chien also served as the English secretary and interpreter for President Chiang Kai-shek from 1965 to 1975. Chien recalled frequently serving as an interpreter for President Chiang Kai-shek and said the experience gave him valuable exposure to international leaders.

In 1963, Chien was awarded the 1st Annual Ten Outstanding Young Persons Award of the Republic of China along with other figures such as businessman Wu Yao-ting and politician Peng Ming-min.

Chien was an executive officer for the Ministry from 1962 to 1963 and section chief of the 1st Section of the Department of North American Affairs from 1964 to March 1967. He served as the deputy director-general of the Department from March 1967 to July 1969 and then as director-general from July 1969 to June 1972. As Director-General in Taipei, he pushed to accelerate congressional liaison work in Washington. He also helped initiated massive invitational programs for senators, members of the House, and congressional aides to visit Taiwan.

On August 18, 1969, Chien graduated from the 10th class of the Defense Research Institute.

In September 1971, Chien attended the Twenty-sixth session of the United Nations General Assembly as an advisor to the Permanent Mission of the Republic of China to the UN.

Two months prior to Richard Nixon's 1972 visit to China, Chien interpreted for Deputy Premier Chiang Ching-Kuo during a two-hours long conversation with US Ambassador Walter P. McConaughy.

In March 1972, he met with his counterpart, Assistant Secretary of State for Far Eastern Affairs Marshall Green, in Taipei and discussed the after-effects of Nixon's visit to the mainland. During their conversation, the two discussed the meaning of the "normalization" of relations with the mainland. Green claimed that the US would maintain diplomatic ties and the Sino-American Mutual Defense Treaty with the ROC.

Chien taught at the National Chengchi University as an adjunct associate professor between 1962 and 1964, and as an adjunct professor at National Taiwan University from 1970 to 1972.

== Director-General of the Government Information Office ==
In June 1972, Chien was appointed as the 7th director-general of the Government Information Office (GIO) by Premier Chiang Ching-kuo, succeeding James Wei.

In June 1974, Chien opened the 20th Asian Film Festival in Taipei, emphasizing the importance of Asian countries developing their own film industries.

As the director-general of the GIO, Chien hosted the 10th and 11th Golden Bell Awards in 1974 and 1975.

Chien traveled abroad seven times as Director-General, with four trips to the United States, two to Europe, and one to Korea. Floyd Kalber interviewed Chien on NBC's Today Show on April 16, 1974, and he also appeared on ABC's AM America on March 14, 1975. On March 18, 1975, Chien delivered an address to a Joint Session of the New Hampshire State Legislature, speaking about the friendship between the two nations and ROC's goal towards economic equality. During his trips, he met with United States Information Agency Director Frank Shakespeare, Assistant Secretary of State for East Asian and Pacific Affairs Robert S. Ingersoll, former Governor of California Pat Brown, Admiral John S. McCain Jr., and more.

Ting Mao-shih replaced Chien as the Director-General of the Government Information Office in May 1975.

== Vice and Deputy Minister of Foreign Affairs ==
The Cabinet approved Chien's appointment as Vice Minister of Foreign Affairs on May 15, 1975, and Chien assumed his new position on May 19.

On February 14, 1978, Chien began an eight-country diplomatic tour to strengthen ties with European nations. The trip included stops in Belgium, the Netherlands, France, Italy, the Holy See, and more. During the same trip, he met with the Austrian Chancellor Bruno Kreisky and foreign minister Willibald Pahr.

After President Jimmy Carter's announcement to de-recognize the Republic of China on December 16, 1978, Chien met with US Ambassador Leonard S. Unger and provided six suggestions to the US Government. According to the Chien, the recommendations included: 1) to protect the Chinese residing in the United States; 2) to safeguard our properties in the US; 3) to refrain from lobbying other friendly government to follow the US lead; 4) to secure the validity of treaties and agreements between us; 5) to set up new offices for continuing all kinds of exchanges (we suggested the name should be 'Republic of China Liaison Office in the United States' as proposed by Senator Edward Kennedy earlier); and, 6) to continue supplying us with defensive weapons as required.

On December 27, Chien received the United States delegation led by Deputy Secretary of State Warren Christopher. During the joint press conference at Taipei Songshan Airport, Chien stated that the de-recognition "disrupted the traditional friendship and harmonious relations between our two countries and has seriously impaired the peace and security of the Asian‐Pacific region." He also declared that "the US government unilaterally yielded to Chinese Communist terms" in severing diplomatic relations and disregarding commitments such as the Mutual Defense Treaty. Recalling the press conference and the statement he made on behalf of the ROC government, Chien said: "That was not my opinion only. I was speaking from the point of view of my country. Though I received warm praise for my speech, my heart was still heavy, since the break in relations seemed to show that all the efforts of diplomats, including myself, had been in vain."

Chien was promoted to the Deputy Foreign Minister position on July 26, 1979, while serving concurrently as the Director-General of the Department of Policy Planning.

In December 1979, Chien visited Thailand and met with Prime Minister Kriangsak Chamanan and discussed the economic outlook and the status of refugees in Thailand.

Deputy Foreign Minister Chien and Mrs. Chien, along with GIO Director-General James Soong, Deputy Director-General of the Bureau of Foreign Trade Vincent Siew, and others accompanied Premier Sun Yun-suan on a two-week tour of three Central American allies – Costa Rica, Panama, and the Dominican Republic – in August 1980. The delegation met with President Rodrigo Carazo of Costa Rica, President Arístides Royo of Panama, and President Antonio Guzmán of the Dominican Republic.

In early June 1981, Chien made a trip to Singapore and met with Prime Minister Lee Kuan Yew and discussed issues around regional stability. Chien and Lee remained lifelong friends.

In December, Chien accompanied Premier Sun Yun-suan on a visit to Indonesia and met with Suharto and other key officials.

In 1982, Chien became the first ROC Deputy Foreign Minister to visit Japan after the break of diplomatic relations ten years prior. He met with Chief Cabinet Secretary Kiichi Miyazawa on April 12 and with Foreign Minister Yoshio Sakurauchi on April 13.

Also, in 1982, before the issuance of the Third Communiqué (817 Communiqué), which included language on the US's intent to decrease its sale of arms to Taiwan gradually, American Institute in Taiwan (AIT) Director James R. Lilley personally delivered Ronald Reagan's Six Assurances to Chien. Chien then passed the message on to President Chiang Ching-kuo.

He remained as Deputy Foreign Minister until November 19, 1982, when he was appointed as the ROC Representative to the United States by President Chiang Ching-kuo.

== ROC Representative to the United States ==
From November 1982 to July 1988, Chien served as the Representative (ambassador equivalent) of the Coordination Council for North American Affairs (CCNAA) Office in the United States, ROC's de facto embassy in Washington, D.C. Mr. and Mrs. Chien arrived at their new post on January 7, 1963, and was greeted by the former Congressman & Mrs. Walter Judd at the Washington Dulles International Airport.

Upon arriving at his new post, he "found the new assignment very tough, as there was a lack of trust on both sides," and morale at the office was low. He also had to check in with the State Department on everything he did, such as accepting invitations and giving interviews. Soon afterward, such restrictions were lifted.

According to AIT Chairman David Dean, Chien was a brilliant and effective envoy, and his term as the ROC representative "was off to a running start and didn't seem to slow down the entire time he was in Washington." A declassified Central Intelligence Agency memo noted Chien's ability to cultivate relationships with key figures in the US government and private sector and described him as a tough and aggressive diplomat who is "willing to compromise on form in order to obtain a stronger substantive relationship."

Due to the unique status of the ROC, as its representative in the United States, Chien once said: "establishing a long-term friendship requires working at building up good will" and that "all the things in Sino-American relations that are good for us can't be discussed, and the things that are bad are the ones that everyone sees."

Shortly upon arriving at the United States, on January 12, 1983, Chien met with Assistant Secretary of State for East Asian and Pacific Affairs Paul Wolfowitz on Secretary George Shultz's forthcoming trip to the mainland. Wolfowitz briefed Chien again on February 16 after the Secretary's visit.

On February 18, only a month and a half after assuming his post, at the introduction of Senator James A. McClure, Chien met with President Ronald Reagan at a Conservative Political Action Conference reception.

On May 19, at the AIT Washington headquarters located in Arlington County, Virginia, Chien met with National Security Advisor William P. Clark Jr., National Security Council's Gaston J. Sigur Jr., and AIT's David Dean. Chien said that arms sales are essential to the confidence of Taiwan's public. Chien also referenced that Taiwan is willing to help the US assist the economic developments in the Central America region and that joint projects with American funds would be undertaken by Taiwanese personnel and technical teams.

On December 1, Mr. and Mrs. Chien were invited by Vice President George H. W. Bush for a welcome dinner at the Alibi Club, where they discussed their studies at Yale University, bilateral relations between the ROC and US, and the effects of high-level visits between the US and mainland China on Taiwan.

Prior to President Regan's April 1984 visit to the mainland, Chien worked with White House Chief of Staff James Baker, NSC's Sigur, and State Department's Wolfowitz to prevent US concessions to China on issues related to Taiwan.

After the death of the Republic of China statesman Wellington Koo at the age of 97, Chien delivered a eulogy for the former Chinese Ambassador to the United States on November 19, 1985, at Manhattan's Frank E. Campbell Funeral Chapel.

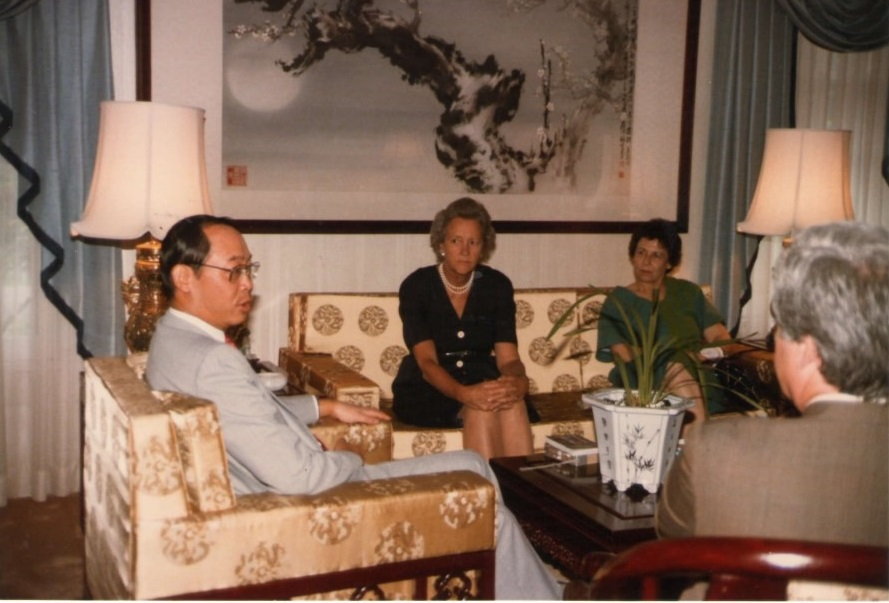
Chien invites Washington Post's Katharine Graham to the historic Twin Oaks Estate, September 11, 1986

During his tenure, Chien delivered a total of 224 speeches. Chien spoke at the state legislatures of Arizona, Pennsylvania, and West Virginia, the US Conference of Mayors, and think tanks such as but not limited to the Council on Foreign Relations, Atlantic Council, and the World Affairs Council. He also toured prestigious universities and gave speeches at Yale, Cornell, Michigan, and Georgetown. In an October 1986 speech at Harvard University titled "The Taiwan Experience Progress – Toward Democracy," Chien spoke about Taiwan's model of development, the processes involved in the success of Taiwan's economic growth, and the benefits of land reform.

In a 1988 interview with the Los Angeles Times's James Mann, Chien said that he personally met with all 100 members of the United States Senate and met with approximately 230 members of the House of Representatives. In the same interview, he also added that "[a]ll the meetings (with executive-branch officials) have to be on neutral ground, such as restaurants, hotels and what-not," and "[i]n terms of frequency, it's much more frequent now than before 1979." Mann went on to say that "Fredrick Chien may not be an Ambassador, but his understanding of how Washington operated and his influence probably exceeded 98% of all ambassadors in Washington."

When Chien was scheduled to leave his post in 1988, over 50 congressmen and senators gave farewell speeches on the floor and paid tribute to Chien's work as the ROC representative. An honor seldom enjoyed even by departing foreign ambassadors. His farewell reception on August 8 at the Hyatt Regency Washington on Capitol Hill was attended by more than 3200 guests from all three branches of government, including but not limited to Under Secretary of State for Political Affairs Michael Armacost, Attorney General Edwin Meese, Secretary of Commerce William Verity Jr., Secretary of Agriculture Richard Lyng, 17 senators, 48 members of congress, and an associate justice of the Supreme Court of the United States.

=== Twin Oaks restoration ===
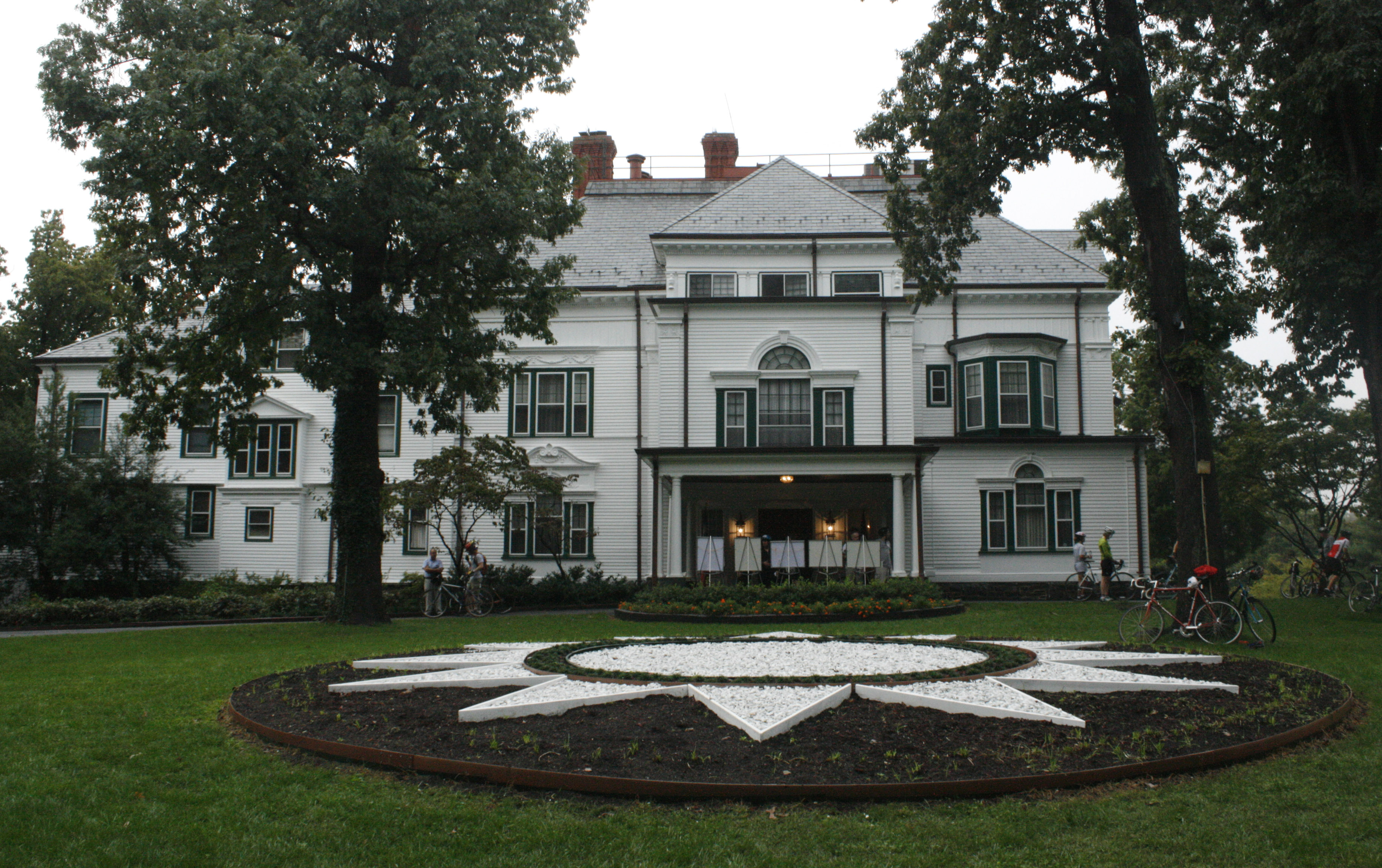
The Twin Oaks Estate was restored during Chien's tenure

When Chien arrived in Washington, D.C., in 1983, Twin Oaks, ROC ambassador's former residence, required extensive repairs upon the transfer of the property back to the ROC Government from the Friends of Free China Association a few months prior. Chien and his wife supervised the repair and restoration of the 26-room English Georgian Renaissance-style mansion. The Chiens sourced Chinese calligraphy and paintings through the Director of the National Palace Museum and furniture from the Veterans Affairs Council's associated businesses. Upon its completion, while the mission was no longer the representative's residence, it was used for cultural, economic, and social purposes. After being closed for two thousand plus days and a nine-months restoration, which cost US$500,000, Twin Oaks reopened on September 13, 1984, and held its first social event for Howard University on the following day.

=== New office building ===
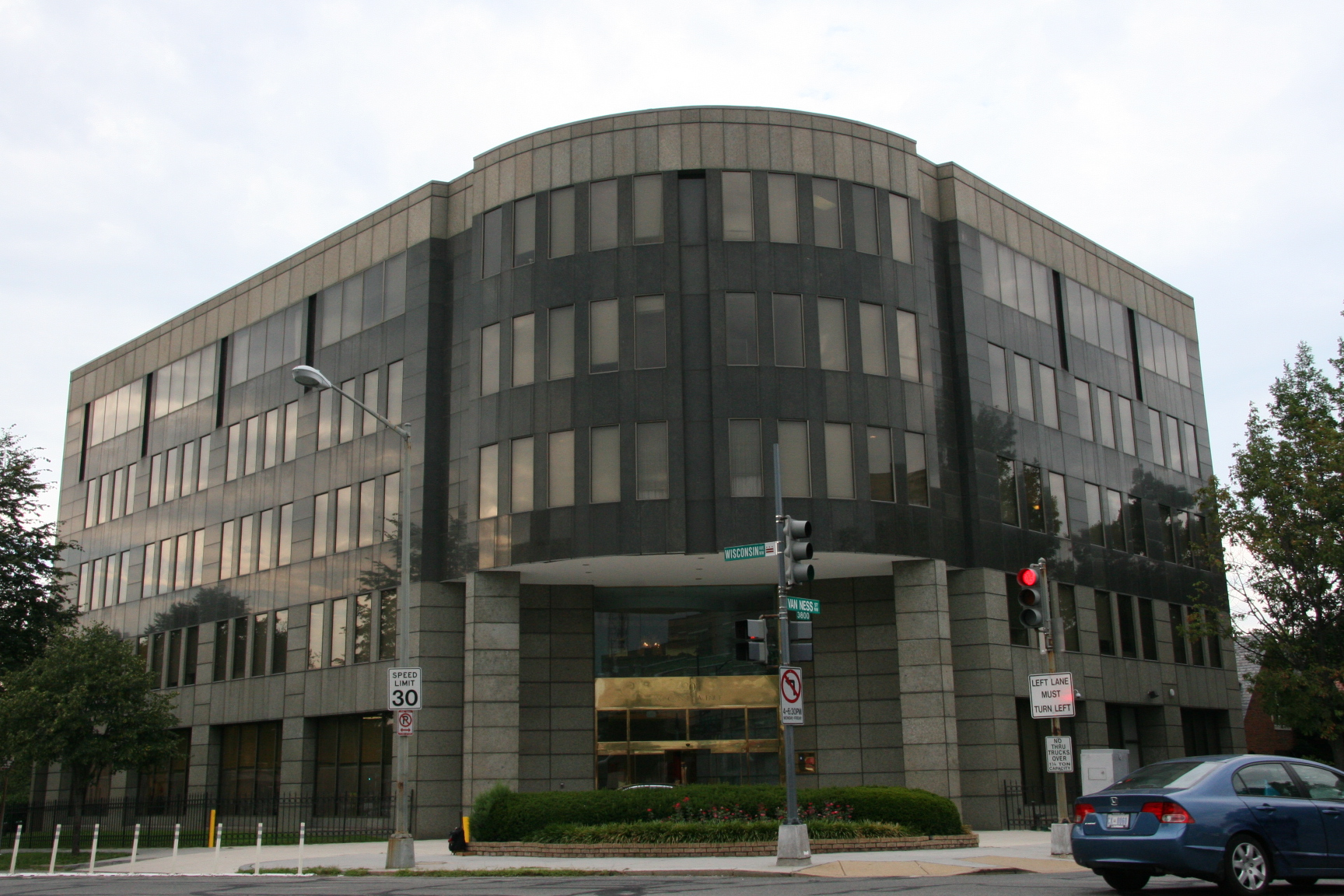
The current TECRO office building on Wisconsin Avenue, Washington, D.C., was purchased and built during Chien's tenure as Representative to the US

Early in Chien's tenure as the ROC Representative, he purchased the land of the current office building of Taipei Economic and Cultural Representative Office in the United States (TECRO), back then known as CCNAA Office in the United States, on Wisconsin Avenue in Northwest, Washington, D.C. The original office building was located on the outskirts of Washington, D.C., on River Road in Bethesda, Maryland. The new 5-story building broke ground in January 1985 and was completed on November 25 of the following year.

== Chairman of the Council for Economic Planning and Development ==
Following the death of President Chiang Ching-kuo in 1988, Chien was recalled to Taipei and appointed by President Lee Teng-hui as the Chairman of the Council for Economic Planning and Development. During his tenure, he served concurrently as a Minister without Portfolio of the Executive Yuan, also known as Minister of State. In 1988, Chien was elected as a member of the Kuomintang Central Standing Committee at the 13th National Congress serving in the role until 1998.

Shirley Kuo, the Minister of Finance and Taiwan's first female cabinet minister, was selected as Chein's replacement as Chairperson of the Council for Economic Planning and Development.

== Minister of Foreign Affairs ==
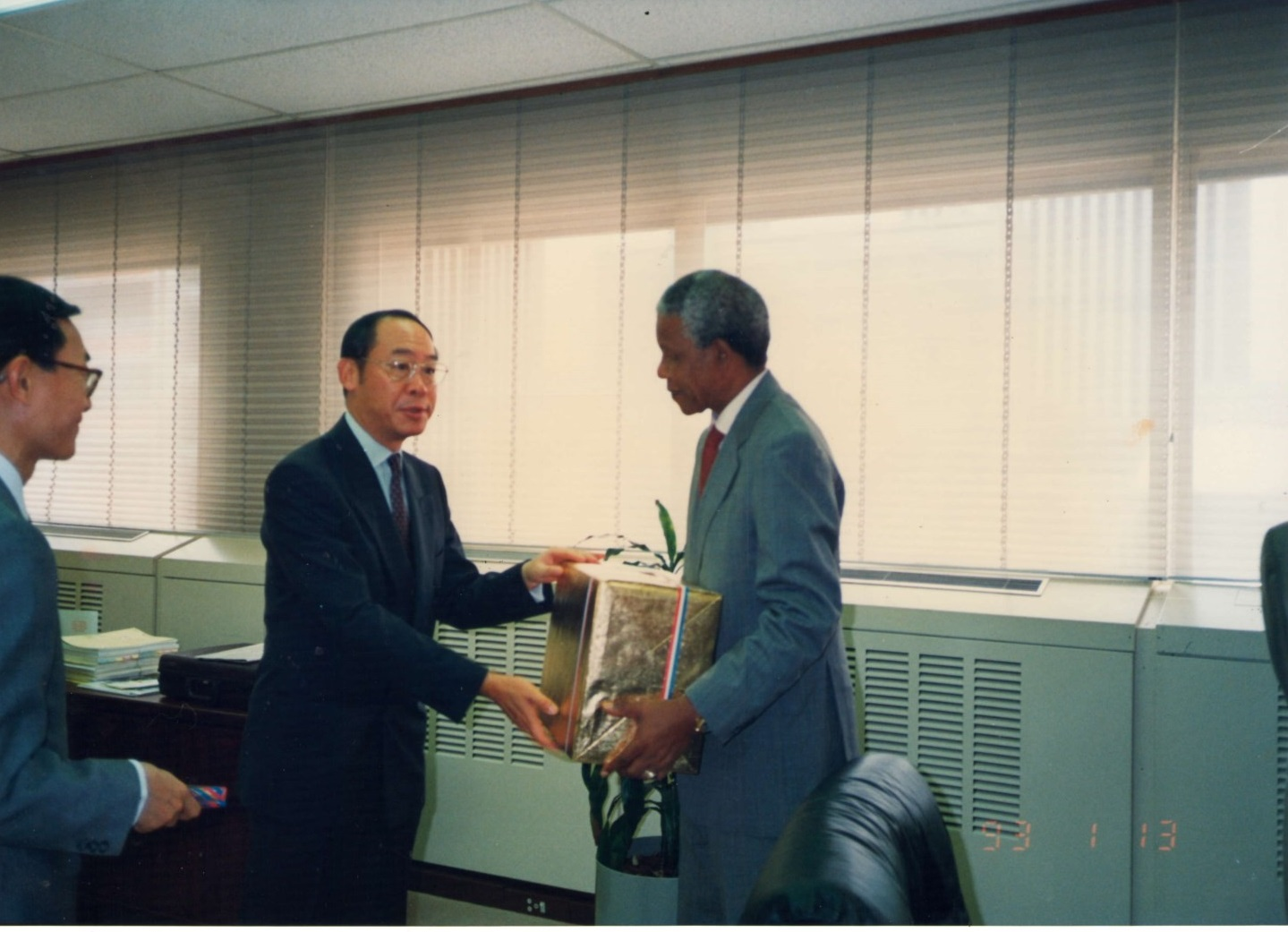
Chien meets with African National Congress's Nelson Mandela in Johannesburg, South Africa in 1993

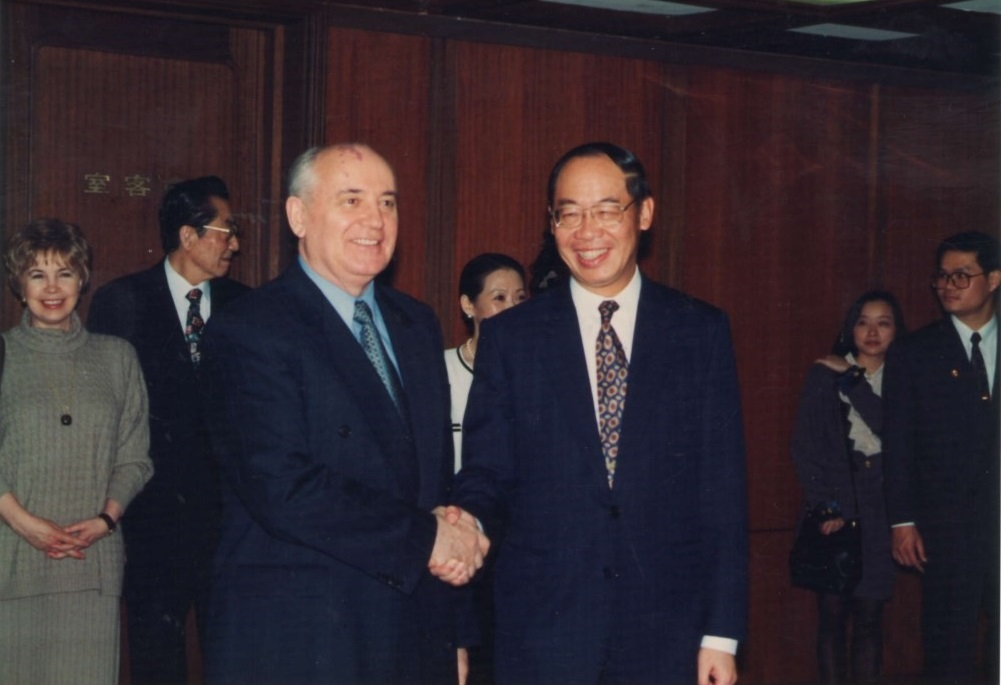
Chien welcomes Mr. & Mrs. Mikhail Gorbachev to Taipei, March 21, 1994

On June 1, 1990, as part of the new Hau Pei-tsun cabinet, Chien was appointed the Minister of Foreign Affairs replacing Lien Chan. During his tenure as Foreign Minister, he also served a member of the Veterans Affairs Council, Mainland Affairs Council, and Council for Cultural Affairs.

Saudi Arabia became the first diplomatic ally to cease ties with the ROC during Chien's tenure, and it established diplomatic relations with the People's Republic in July 1990.

In January 1991, Mr. and Mrs. Chien traveled to Africa to meet with South Africa's F. W. de Klerk and Swaziland's Mswati III. The Chiens were accompanied by Section Chief David Lin, who would, later on, become the Minister of Foreign Affairs under President Ma Ying-jeou's administration. During a meeting with President de Klerk on January 22, the South African leader assured that his government cherished the special relationship with the ROC and that there was no hidden agenda to develop relations with the mainland. During the visit, Chien and South Africa's Minister of Finance Barend du Plessis signed an agreement for the ROC to provide South Africa's Industrial Development Corporation with a $60 million low-interest loan.

Speaking at the International Conference on the Republic of China and the New International Order on August 21, 1991, Chien said that his country stands beside the freedom-loving nations of the world and is "willing to seize every opportunity to fulfill (her) destiny in a transformed international context." He added that the three prongs of "pragmatic diplomacy" are to consolidate and strengthen existing diplomatic ties, develop and upgrade substantive ties with countries without diplomatic relations, and to participate or resume participation in international organizations and activities according to a more flexible formula.

In a December 1991 essay published in Foreign Affairs, Chien shared Taiwan's model of "pragmatic diplomacy" and also stated that "Taiwan's experience shows that the Chinese people, like any other people, are fully capable of practicing democracy, promoting rapid economic growth ... and living peacefully with their neighbors." Chien also cited Taiwan's growing status in the international community, with its growing economic strength, rapid democratization, and flexible diplomacy.

On June 29, 1992, Chien announced that the ROC resumed diplomatic relations with the African nation of Niger, without asking the Niger government to sever ties with the mainland. Soon afterward, the mainland broke off diplomatic ties with Niger.

During a July interview with political scientist Dennis V. Hickey, when asked about the issue of representation, Chien stressed that "we still adhere to the position of one China and that Taiwan is a part of (the Republic of) China."

When the Republic of Korea, the last Asian country with formal diplomatic relations with ROC, decided to transfer diplomatic recognition to the PRC in August, as foreign minister, Chien criticized"[t]he Government of Roh Tae-woo has violated the trust and trampled on international justice."

Chien and his wife Julie made a visit to Singapore in November 1992 despite Singapore's official diplomatic relationship with Beijing.

Chien cited in the 1992 year-end press conference that while the ROC formally applied for accession to the GATT (under the name of Separate Customs Territory of Taiwan, Penghu, Kinmen, and Matsu), "the biggest challenge for us...would be re-entry to the United Nations."

Chien made a "private visit" to Japan as the ROC foreign minister in February 1993, marking the first ministerial visit to Japan since 1972 when the two nations broke its relations.

On April 21, two weeks after President Lee's announcement at the Legislative Yuan, Chien announced that the ROC would formally apply to rejoin the UN by September 1995, the first time the ROC government published a timeframe on its bid to rejoin the UN. On July 4, speaking on television, Chien called for the people of Taiwan to "tell their foreign friends that it is unfair and wrong for the international community to refuse to accept 20.8 million people who want to join the United Nations." Weeks later, on July 29, at the ROC-Central American Joint Cooperative Committee Conference, in San José, Costa Rica, Chien called upon the attendees' nations to speak in favor of the ROC membership in the UN during the UN General Assembly.

At a speech sponsored by the Friends of the East-West Center on August 6, Chien said that close economic, commercial, and technological cooperation is key to avoiding confrontation. He also emphasized that the ROC intends to "be a partner for peace, progress and prosperity in what we hope will be a more enlightened era ahead."

Commenting on the ROC's participation in the UN in January 1994 interview, Chien said: "Ever since we declared our intention to participate in the UN, (Beijing) has become even more adamant in its attempts to downgrade our (ROC) status and evade reality."

Chien and President Lee attended Nelson Mandela's inauguration on May 10, 1994, after South Africa's historic all-race election.

On January 3, 1996, the ROC and Senegal re-established diplomatic relations, bringing the number of countries that recognizes the ROC to 31. At the joint communique signing ceremony with Foreign Minister Moustapha Niasse, Chien noted that the "establishment of diplomatic ties marks a significant development in our pursuit of pragmatic diplomacy."

Later on towards his term as foreign minister, it was reported that Chien had quarrels with President Lee over the key elements of pragmatic diplomacy, leading Lee to shift more decision making directly to the Office of the President.

== Speaker of the National Assembly ==
Chien was elected Speaker on July 8, 1996, four days after the 3rd National Assembly (NA) began. Chien, a member of the KMT, was selected with the support of the New Party, the third-largest party in the NA, as the KMT only held a slim majority in the Assembly. Hsieh Lung-sheng was elected as deputy speaker.

== President of the Control Yuan ==
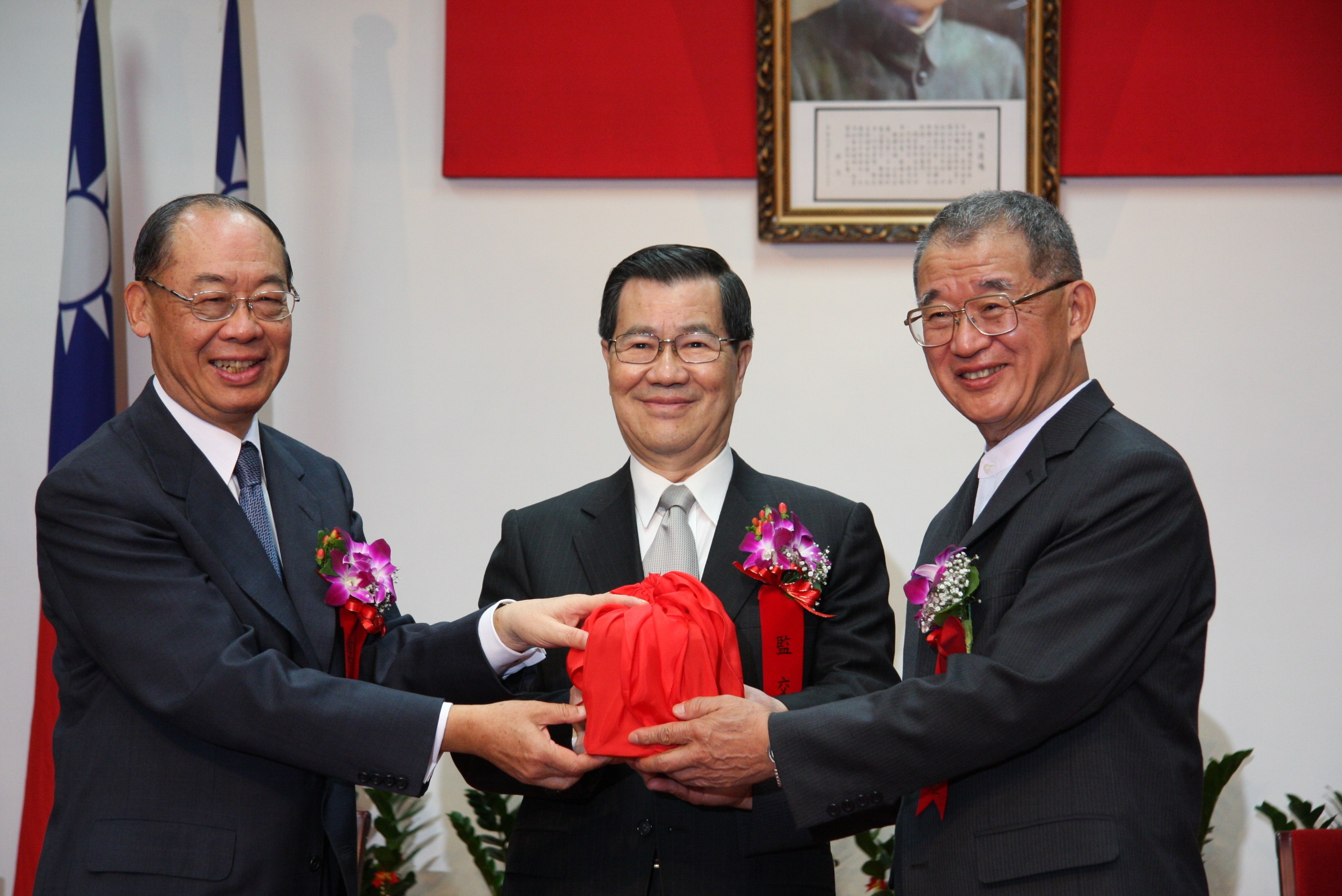
Chien (left) and Vice President Vincent Siew (middle) and incoming Control Yuan President Wang Chien-shien (right) at the handover ceremony in 2008

On December 3, 1998, President Lee Teng-hui announced his intention to nominate Chien to replace Wang Tso-jung as the President of the Control Yuan. Lee sent the formal nomination over to the National Assembly for confirmation on December 5. The confirmation introductions and hearings took place between December 16 and 22, and the review process by Assembly members took place between December 23 and January 12 of the following year. On January 13, 1999, the National Assembly confirmed Chien as President of the Control Yuan. Chien was sworn in on February 1 for a six-year term.

In 2001, after the September 11 attacks, Chien was asked by President Chen Shui-bian to visit New York on behalf of the ROC government and to present a $1 million check for the people of the United States.

In June 2004, President Chen appointed Chien as a special envoy to attend the state funeral of former US President Ronald Reagan in the United States.

On July 6, 2004, President Chen Shui-bian appointed Chien as the Chair of the 319 Shooting Truth Investigation Special Committee.

After more than four decades of career in public service, Chien concluded his six-year term on January 31, 2005, and returned to private life.

On March 9, 2005, Chien received the Order of Chiang Chung-Cheng from President Chen Shui-bian for his service as the President of the Control Yuan. In his remarks, he stated the importance of an independent Control Yuan and its position in the Constitution of the Republic of China.

Following his tenure, the candidate nominated by President Chen Shui-bian was not confirmed by the Legislative Yuan controlled by the Kuomintang; thus, the Control Yuan was idle until the confirmation of Wang Chien-shien 2008 under the new Ma Ying-jeou administration.

== Post political career ==
Since his retirement in 2005, Chien has served as the Chairperson of the Cathay Charity Foundation and a senior advisor of the Cathay United Bank. Chien previously sat on the bank's board of directors. Since 2011, Chien succeeded Lee Huan as the Chairman of the Pacific Cultural Foundation. Chien also serves along with Morris Chang and Lien Chan as a board member for the Chiang Ching-kuo Foundation for International Scholarly Exchange. The private nonprofit organization provides support for research grants on Chinese studies in the humanities and social sciences at overseas institutions. Chien was elected chairman of the foundation in 2019.

Chien is a Distinguished Chair Professor at Chung Hua University, a private university Hsinchu City, Taiwan, and the Honorary Dean of the university's Chung Hua College.

Chien, along with Acer Inc.'s Stan Shih and others, were promoters of Dharma Drum Mountain and Ven. Master Sheng-yen's New Six Ethics Campaign for Social Harmony and Peace.

In 2010, Chien was awarded the Distinguished Alumni Award by National Taiwan University.

On March 24, 2015, Chien accompanied President Ma Ying-jeou to Singapore to pay last respects to Singapore's founding father, Lee Kuan Yew, at the private wake at Sri Temasek.

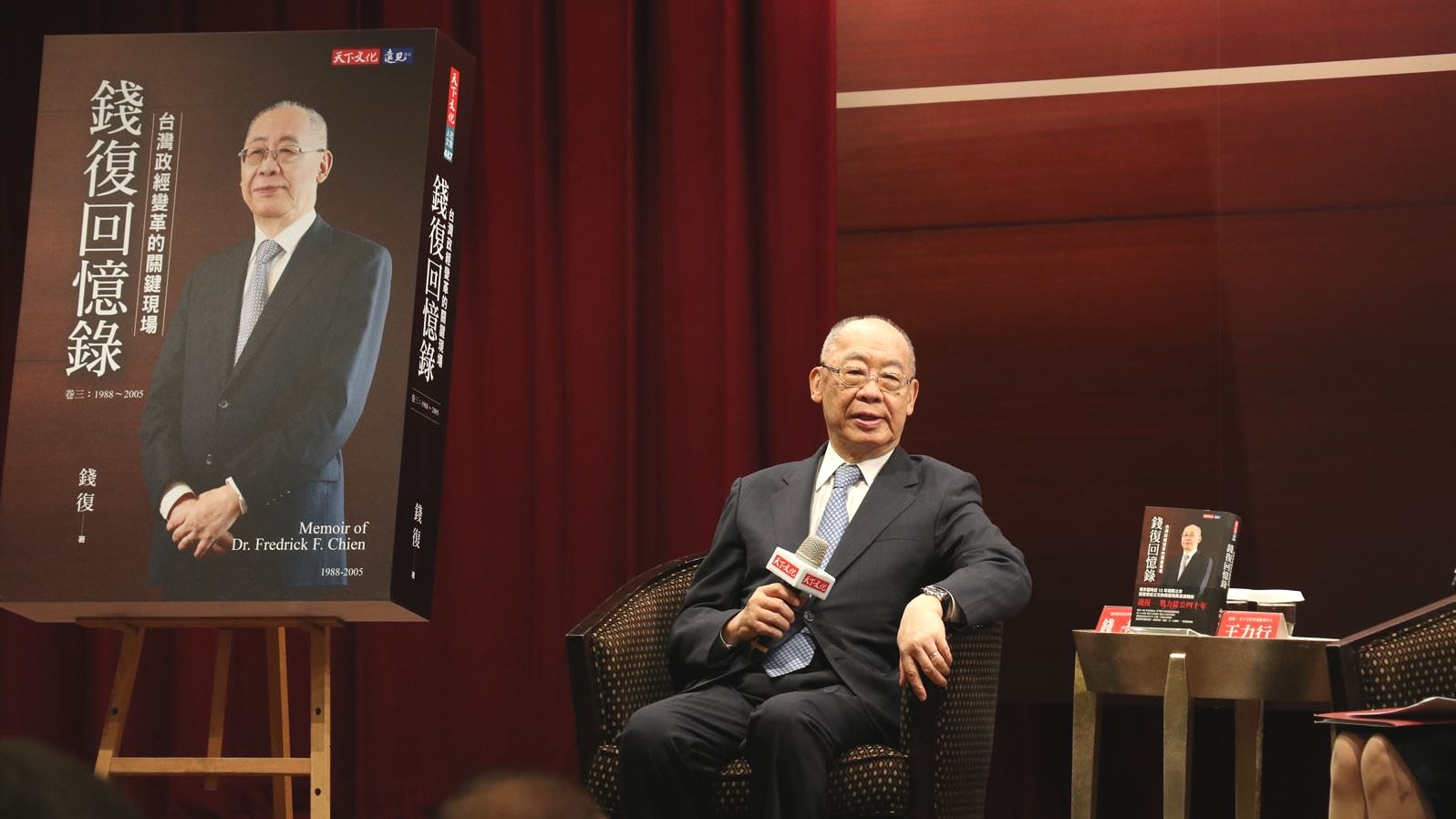
Chien presents his third memoir, May 12, 2020

On May 12, 2020, Chien's new memoir presentation ceremony was attended by former Vice President Vincent Siew, former President of the Legislative Yuan Wang Jin-pyng, former Governor of the Central Bank Perng Fai-nan, Foxconn founder Terry Gou, in addition to three former Ministers of Foreign Affairs, Chen Chien-jen, Francisco Ou, and Timothy Yang. His wife, Julie, children Carl and Carol, and grandchildren were also present. At the event, Siew, who once worked under Chien as his deputy at the Council for Economic Planning and Development, credited Chien as a very successful and an excellent diplomat. Chien mentioned that the pragmatic diplomacy practiced during his time as the foreign minister did not equate to "money diplomacy." He also spoke about how he turned down President Lee Teng-hui's offer to form a cabinet as he believed that being premier was an impossible mission.

=== Boao Forum for Asia ===
Chien, in his capacity as the senior advisor of the Cross-Straits Common Market Foundation, attended and led multiple delegations to the Boao Forum for Asia in Hainan. From 2009 to 2011, Chien met with Chinese Premier Wen Jiabao, known to the media as the "Chien-Wen Meetings."

== Family and personal life ==
Chien is married to Julie Tien, with whom he has a son and a daughter, Carl and Carol. Carl Chien received an MBA from Georgetown University and now serves as the Vice-chairman Asia Pacific and Senior Country Officer Taiwan for JPMorgan. Carl married Virginia (Ginny) Hu, with sons Justin, Darren, and Fred Jr., and daughter Christen. Carol married David Sun, with daughters Alex, Katherine, and son William.

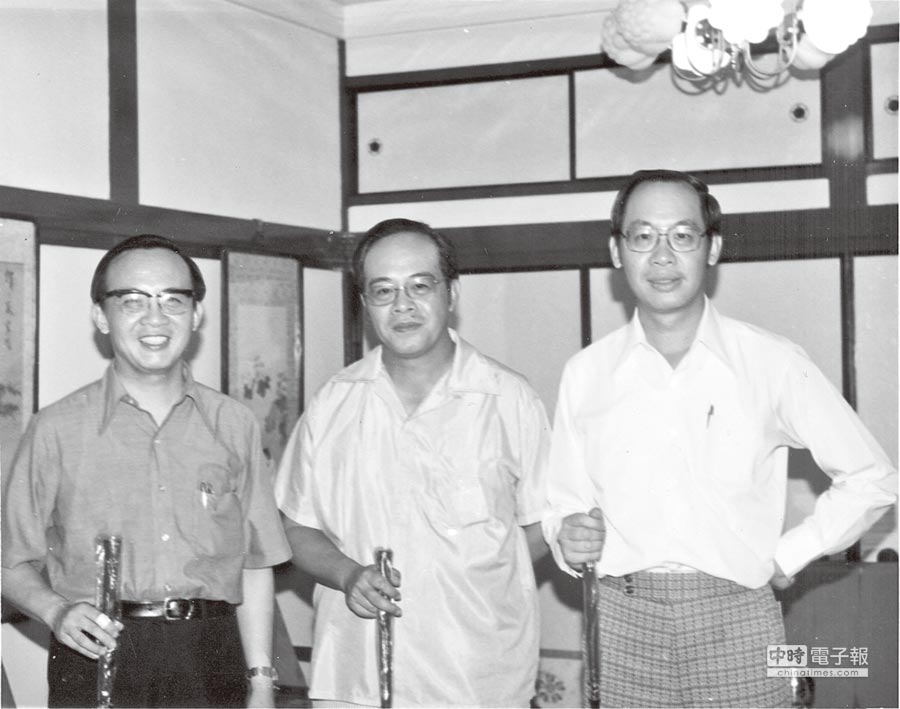
Chien (right) with his brothers Robert (middle) and Shu (left) holding golf clubs in 1970

Chien is the youngest of the three siblings, the others being Robert and Shu. Chien's eldest brother, Robert Chien, was an economist and government official who served as the Minister of Finance, and the Secretary-General of the Executive Yuan. Chein's second brother, Shu Chien, is a physiologist and bioengineer, a recipient of the National Medal of Science, and a professor at the University of California, San Diego.

Chien is known as one of the "four princes of Taiwan" along with Lien Chan, Chen Li-an, and Shen Chun-shan, all of whose fathers attained prominence in politics prior to their sons' successes.

Chien is a member of the American University Club in Taipei and an honorary member of the Club of Rome.

Chien speaks Mandarin, English, and Cantonese. He also enjoys playing golf.

Chien once said that he is always serious in his attitude to life, study, work, and self-improvement.

== Awards and honours ==
=== National honours ===
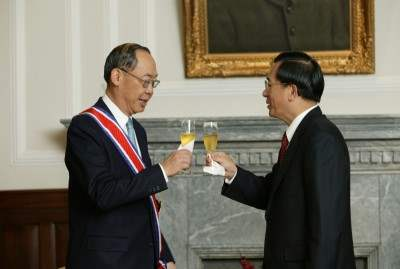
Chien receives the Order of Chiang Chung-Cheng from President Chen Shui-bian at the Presidential Office Building in 2005

- Republic of China: Order of Brilliant Star with Grand Cordon (1975)
- Republic of China: Order of Propitious Clouds with Special Grand Cordon (2000)
- Republic of China: Order of Chiang Chung-Cheng (2005)

=== Foreign honours ===
- South Korea: Order of Diplomatic Service Merit (1972)
- South Vietnam: Sac-Lenh of the Order of Kim Khanh (1973)
- Paraguay: Grand Cross of the Order of National Merit (1975)
- Dominican Republic: Grand Officer of the Order of Merit of Duarte, Sánchez and Mella (1975)
- Dominican Republic: Grand Cross with Silver Breast Star of the Order of Merit of Duarte, Sánchez and Mella (1975)
- Honduras: Grand Cross with Silver Star of the José Cecilio del Valle Order (1979)
- El Salvador: Grand Cross with Silver Star of the Order of José Matías Delgado (1979)
- Haiti: Grand Officer of the National Order of Honour and Merit (1979)
- South Africa: Grand Cross of the Order of Good Hope (1979)
- Panama: Order of Vasco Núñez de Balboa (1980)
- Dominican Republic: Grand Cross with Silver Breast Star of the Order of Christopher Columbus (1982)
- Paraguay: Extraordinary Grand Cross of the Order of National Merit (1975)
- Swaziland: Chief Counsellor of the Royal Order of the King Sobhuza II (1991)
- Honduras: Grand Cross with Silver Star of the Order of Francisco Morazán (1991)
- Central African Republic: Grand Officer of the Order of Central African Merit (1992)
- Guatemala: Grand Cross of the Order of the Quetzal (1992)
- El Salvador: Grand Cross with Silver Star of the Order of José Matías Delgado (1992)
- Guatemala: Grand Cross of the Order of Antonio José de Irisarri (1992)
- Nicaragua: Grand Cross of the Order of José Dolores Estrada Battle of San Jacinto (1993)
- Costa Rica: Grand Silver Cross of the National Order of Juan Mora Fernández (1993)
- Niger: Grand Officer of the National Order of Niger (1994)
- Burkina Faso: Officer of the National Order of Burkina Faso (1994)
- Panama: Grand Cross of the Order of Manuel Amador Guerrero (1994)
- Guinea Bissau: National Order of Merit of Co-operation and Development (1995)
- Guatemala: Grand Cross of the Order of the National Sovereign Congress (1995)

=== Honorary degrees ===
- South Korea: Honorary LL.D. degree, Sung Kyun Kwan University (1972)
- Honorary LL.D. degree, American University in the Caribbean (1988)
- United States: Honorary D.Lit. degree, Wilson College (1993)
- United States: Honorary Dr. of Public Service, Florida International University (1994)
- United States: Honorary LL.D. degree, Boston University (1997)
- United States: Honorary LL.D. degree, Idaho State University (1997)

=== Awards ===
- 1st Annual Ten Outstanding Young Persons Award of the Republic of China (1963)
- 5th Annual National Taiwan University Distinguished Alumni Award (2010)

== Published works ==
=== Books ===
- Chien, Fredrick Foo (1967), The opening of Korea; A Study of Chinese Diplomacy, 1876-1885, Connecticut: Shoestring Press, OCLC 953610
- Chien, Fredrick Foo (1975), Speaking As a Friend, Taipei: Government Information Office, OCLC 7507165
- Chien, Fredrick Foo (1976), More Views of A Friend, Taipei: Government Information Office, OCLC 961588577
- Chien, Fredrick Foo (1988), Faith and Resilience: The Republic of China Forges Ahead, Kwang Hwa Publishing U.S.A. Inc.
- Chien, Fredrick Foo (1995), Opportunity and Challenge, Tempe: Arizona Historical Foundation, OCLC 607811502
- 錢復 (2005), 錢復回憶錄 [The Memoirs of Fredrick Chien] (in Chinese (Taiwan)), 天下遠見出版股份有限公司, ISBN 978-986-417-416-4, OCLC 58650808. In two volumes (ISBN 9789864174171, ISBN 978-986-417-418-8).
- 錢復 (2020), 錢復回憶錄・卷三 1988-2005台灣政經變革的關鍵現場 [The Memoirs of Fredrick Chien] (in Chinese (Taiwan)), 天下遠見出版股份有限公司, ISBN 978-986-479-995-4.

=== Journal articles ===
- Chien, Fredrick Foo (1996), "Pragmatic Diplomat: The Principles of Taiwanese Foreign Policy", Harvard International Review, 19 (1), ISSN 0739-1854, OCLC 91933623

== See also ==
- Politics of the Republic of China
- Foreign relations of Taiwan
- Taiwan–United States relations
- List of ministers of foreign affairs (Republic of China)
- List of presidents of the Control Yuan

Government offices
Preceded by James Wei	Director-General of the Government Information Office; 1972–1975	Succeeded by Ting Mao-shih
Preceded by Chao Yao-tung	Chairman of the Council for Economic Planning and Development; 1988–1990	Succeeded by Shirley Kuo
Preceded by Lien Chan	Minister of Foreign Affairs; 1990–1996	Succeeded by John Chiang
Preceded by Wang Tso-yung	President of the Control Yuan; 1999–2005	Succeeded by Vacant (2005-2008); Wang Chien-shien (2008)
Diplomatic posts
Preceded by Cai Weiping	ROC Representative to the United States; 1982–1988	Succeeded by Ting Mao-shih
Political offices
Preceded by New office	Speaker of the National Assembly; 1996–1999	Succeeded by Su Nan-cheng
Non-profit organization positions
Preceded by	Chairperson of the Cathay Charity Foundation; 2005–present	Incumbent
Preceded by Mao Kao-wen	Chairman of the Chiang Ching-kuo Foundation; 2019–present	Incumbent
