= Christina Liu =

Taiwanese politician (born 1955)

Liu Yee-ru
- 劉憶如
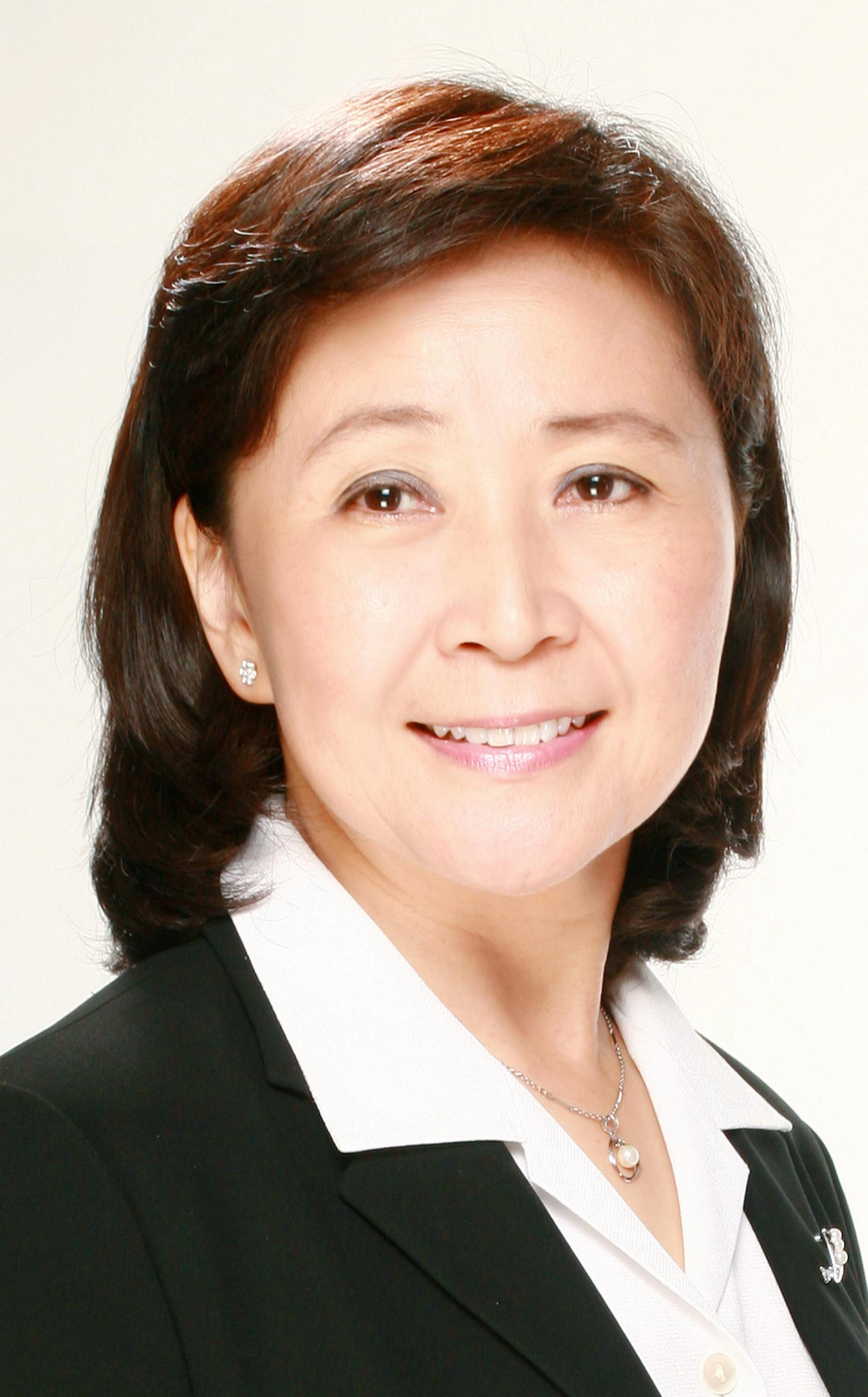
- Liu in 2010

Minister of Finance
- In office 6 February 2012 – 30 May 2012
- Preceded by: Lee Sush-der
- Succeeded by: Chang Sheng-ford

Minister of Council for Economic Planning and Development
- In office 20 May 2010 – 6 February 2012
- Preceded by: Tsai Hsun-hsiung
- Succeeded by: Yiin Chii-ming

Member of the Legislative Yuan
- In office 1 February 2002 – 20 November 2007
- Succeeded by: Luo Shu-lei

Personal details
- Born: 7 April 1955 (age 71) Taipei, Taiwan
- Party: Non-Partisan Solidarity Union (since 2007); People First Party (until 2007)
- Parent: Shirley Kuo (mother)
- Education: National Taiwan University (BA); University of Chicago (MBA, PhD)

Liu Yee-ru (Chinese: 劉憶如; pinyin: Liú Yìrú; born 7 April 1955), also known by her English name Christina Liu, is a Taiwanese economist and politician. She was first elected to the Legislative Yuan in 2001, and served until 2007. Subsequently, Liu led the Council for Economic Planning and Development from 2010 to 2012, when she was named finance minister. Liu left the finance ministry later that year and was appointed to the Hong Kong Economic Development Commission in 2013.

== Early life and education ==
Liu was born in Taipei on April 7, 1955. Her father, Liu Qingrui, was a professor of political science at National Taiwan University. Her mother, Shirley Kuo, was an economist in the Ministry of Finance. She has two sisters: Eileen and Sharon.

After graduating from Taipei First Girls' High School, Liu studied political science at National Taiwan University and obtained a Bachelor of Arts (B.A.) in 1977. She then completed advanced studies in the United States, where she earned a Master of Business Administration (M.B.A.) in 1980 and her Ph.D. in economics in 1986, both from the University of Chicago. Her doctoral dissertation, completed under Israeli economist Jacob A. Frenkel, was titled, "Effects of Monetary and Real Shocks on Exchange Rate Dynamics".

== Political career ==
Liu served in the Legislative Yuan from 2002 to 2007 as a member of the People First Party. She resigned her legislative seat in November 2007 to run for reelection as a member of the Non-Partisan Solidarity Union, and lost. Liu then became the chief economic adviser to Chinatrust Financial Holding until she was named the minister of the Council for Economic Planning and Development in 2010. Liu led the CEPD until 2012, when she was appointed the Minister of Finance. In April 2012, Liu pushed for a capital gains tax against the wishes of the Kuomintang legislative majority. She submitted her resignation on 29 May, and it was approved the next day. In 2013, Liu was appointed to the Hong Kong Economic Development Commission.

== Personal life ==
Liu was married twice. She divorced Johnsee Lee in 1995. Her second marriage, to Simon Dzeng, ended in 2010 when both filed for divorce.
