= Order of Propitious Clouds =

Civilian order of the Republic of China

Order of Propitious Clouds 卿雲勳章
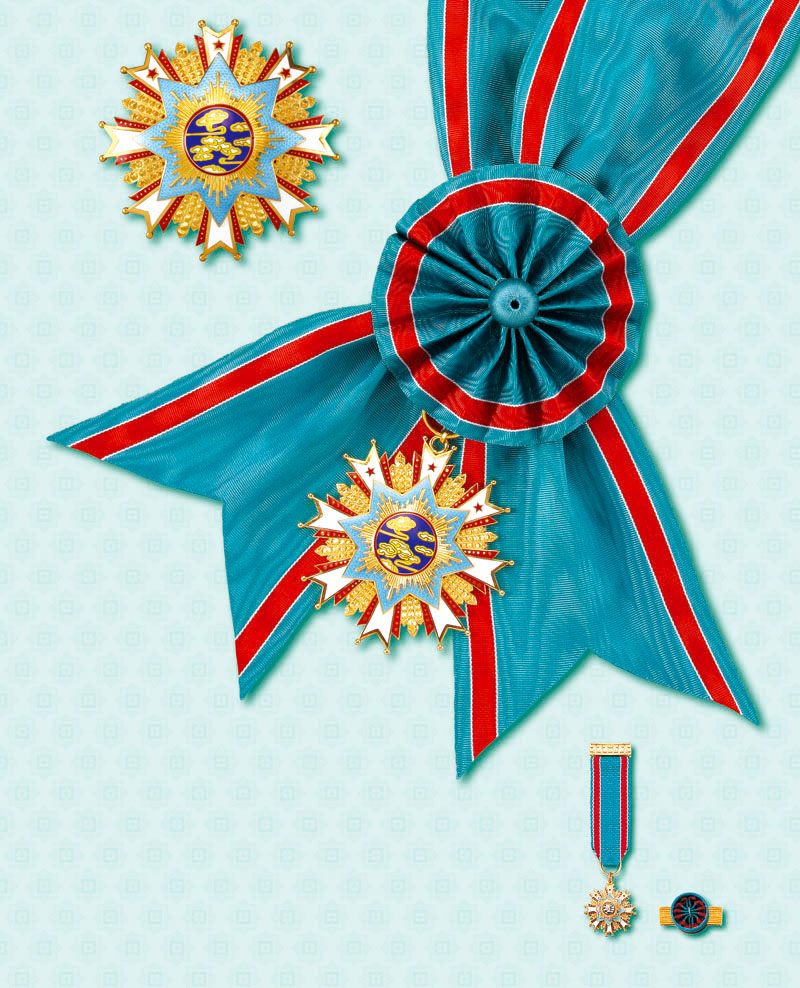
- Order of the Propitious Clouds cordon, badge, star, medal and lapel pin
- Awarded for: Civil servants who had outstanding performances, and non-civil servants and foreigners who contributed for the country.
- Description: The center of the medal features a picture of propitious clouds in token of auspiciousness.
- Country: Republic of China (Taiwan)
- Presented by: President of the Republic of China (Taiwan)
- Eligibility: Civilian
- Status: Active
- Established: 12 February 1941

Precedence
- Next (higher): Order of Chiang Chung-Cheng
- Equivalent: Order of Brilliant Star

Order of Propitious Clouds
- Traditional Chinese: 卿雲勳章
- Simplified Chinese: 卿云勋章
Transcriptions
Standard Mandarin
- Hanyu Pinyin: Qīngyún xūnzhāng
- Wade–Giles: Ch'ing^{1}-yün^{2} hsün^{1}-chang^{1}
- IPA: [tɕʰíŋ.y̌n ɕýnʈʂáŋ]

The Order of Propitious Clouds (Chinese: 卿雲勳章) is a civilian order of the Republic of China (Taiwan). The center of the medal features a picture of clouds, as a token of auspiciousness. This order was instituted in 1941 and classified into nine ranks. As with other orders, both citizens of the Republic of China and foreigners can be awarded the Order of Propitious Clouds.

== History ==
The Order of Propitious Clouds was awarded to twenty persons between 1943 and March 1945.

== Classes ==
Grades	Ribbon bar
1st Class (Special Grand Cordon)	
2nd Class (Grand Cordon)	
3rd Class (Green Grand Cordon)	
4th Class (Special Cravat)	
5th Class (Cravat)	
6th Class (Special Rosette)	
7th Class (Rosette)	
8th Class (Special Ribbon)	
9th Class (Ribbon)	

== Recipients ==
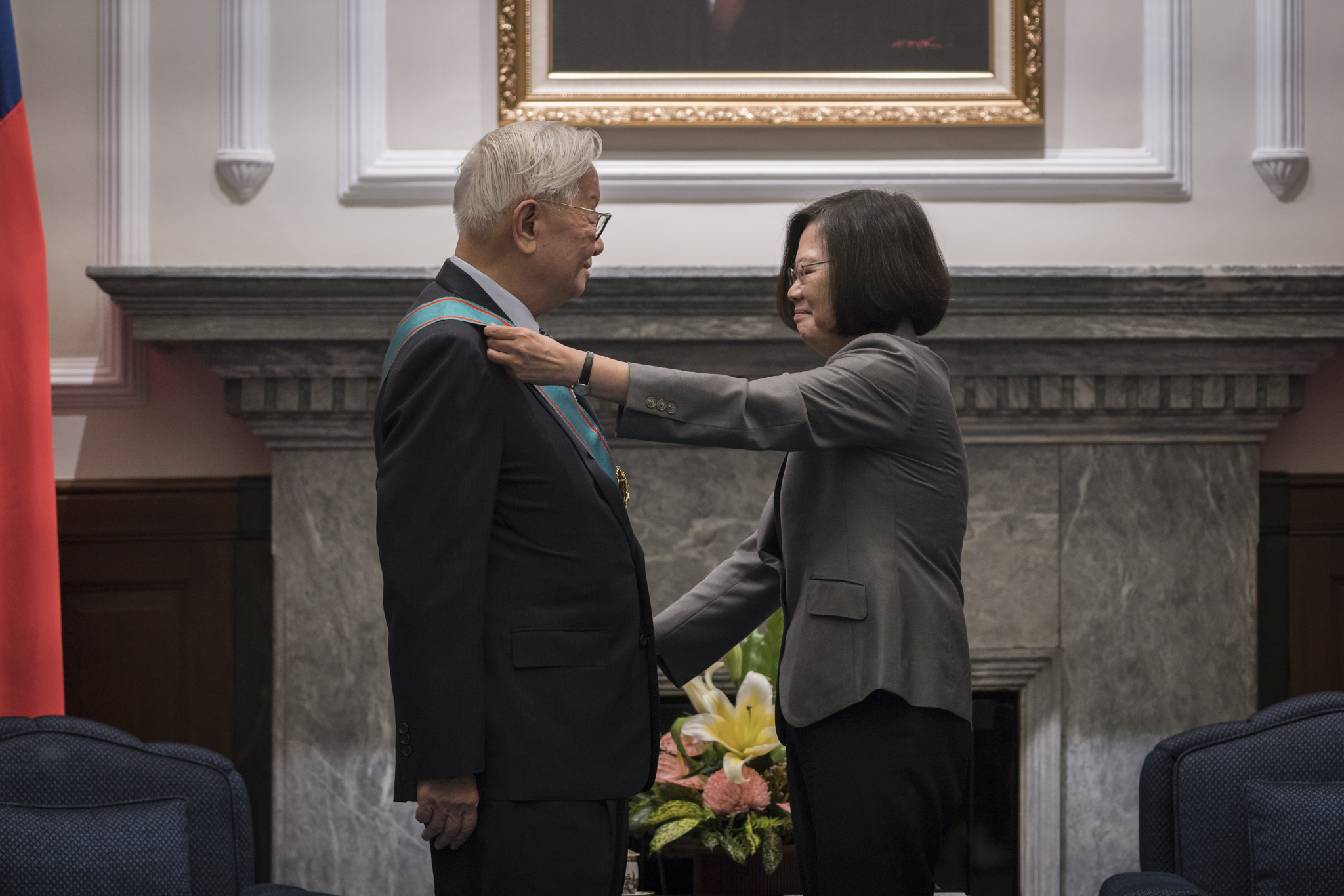
Morris Chang receiving the Order of Propitious Clouds with Special Grand Cordon from President Tsai Ing-wen

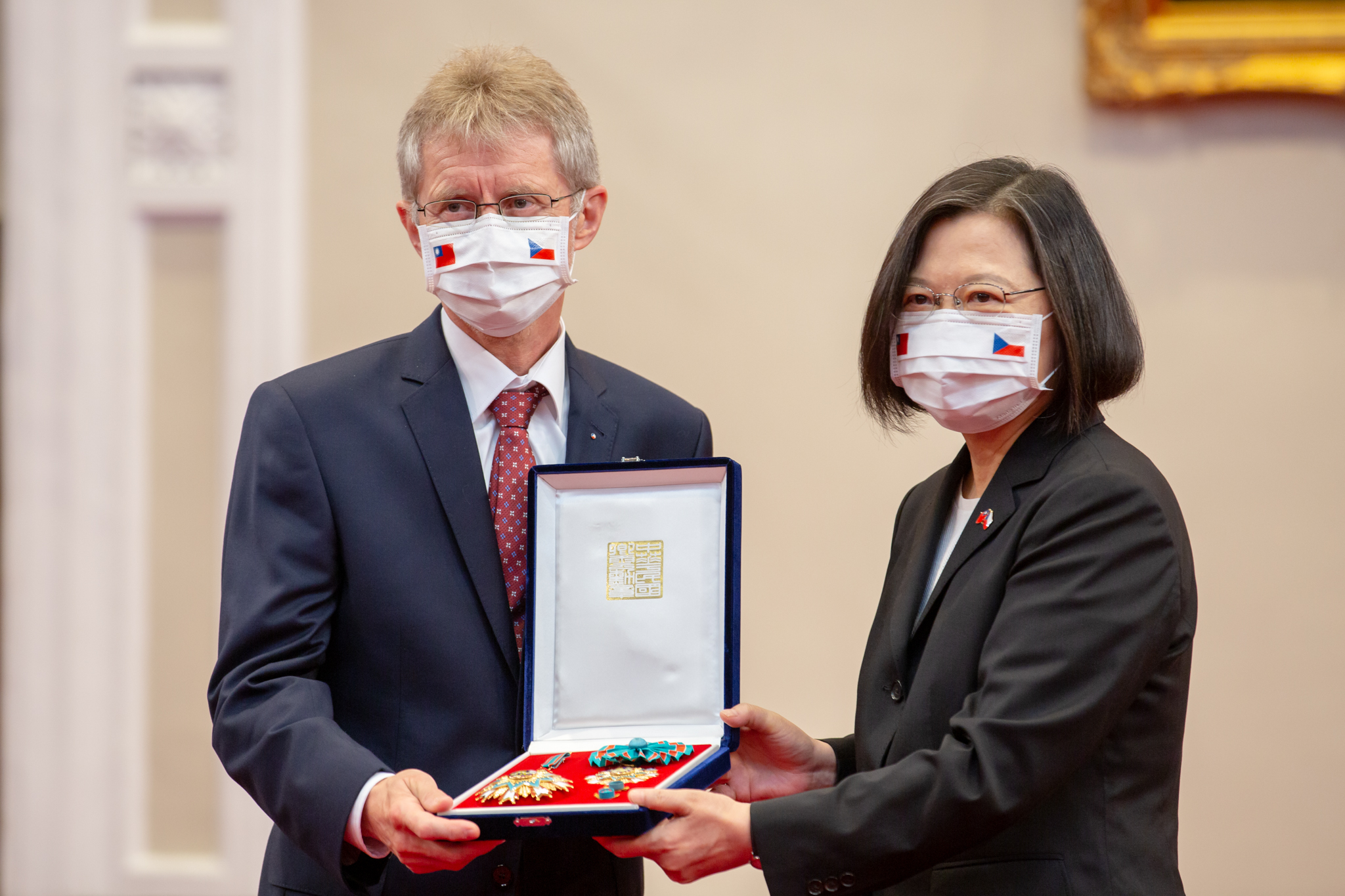
Miloš Vystrčil, in memoriam of his late predecessor Jaroslav Kubera, accepting the Order of Propitious Clouds with Special Grand Cordon

- Edvard Beneš, President of Czechoslovakia
- P. W. Botha, State President of South Africa
- John Antonio Briceño, Prime Minister of Belize
- Raymond F. Burghardt (薄瑞光), Director of the American Institute in Taiwan
- Mohammad Reza Pahlavi, Shah of Iran
- Avila Camacho, President of Mexico
- Morris Chang, founder and former CEO of Taiwan Semiconductor Manufacturing Company (TSMC)
- Chiang Kai-shek, President of the Republic of China
- Fredrick Chien, President of Control Yuan
- Lai Ching-te, 8th President of Taiwan
- José Figueres Ferrer, President of Costa Rica
- Timothy Harris, Prime Minister of Saint Kitts and Nevis
- Jesse Helms, U.S. Senator from North Carolina
- Nobusuke Kishi, Prime Minister of Japan
- Jaroslav Kubera, in memoriam, President of the Senate of the Czech Republic
- Lin Chuan, Premier of the Republic of China
- Eva Macapagal, First Lady of the Philippines
- Park Chung-hee, South Korean president
- Ileana Ros-Lehtinen, Member of the U.S. House of Representatives from Florida's 27th district
- Shih Chi-yang, President of the Judicial Yuan
- Queen mother Sirikit of Thailand
- Hermann Otto Solms, German Father of the House of the Bundestag
- Hassan bin Talal, Jordanian Prince
- Jose Villannueva, Dominican Ambassador to the Republic of China
- Wang Ginn-wang, Minister of the Coast Guard Administration (Taiwan)
- Yin Shun, Buddhist monk and scholar
- Alain Richard, French Senator and former Minister of Defense
- Luis Castiglioni, Paraguayan Minister of Industry and Commerce and former vice-president of Paraguay
- Nancy Pelosi, Speaker of the U.S. House of Representatives
- Jean Robert Pitte, Perpetual Secretary of the Academy of Moral and Political Sciences under the Institut de France
- Shinzo Abe, Prime Minister of Japan

== See also ==
- Song to the Auspicious Cloud
