= Council for Economic Planning and Development =

- 經濟建設委員會; Jīngjì Jiànshè Wěiyuánhuì
- Logo

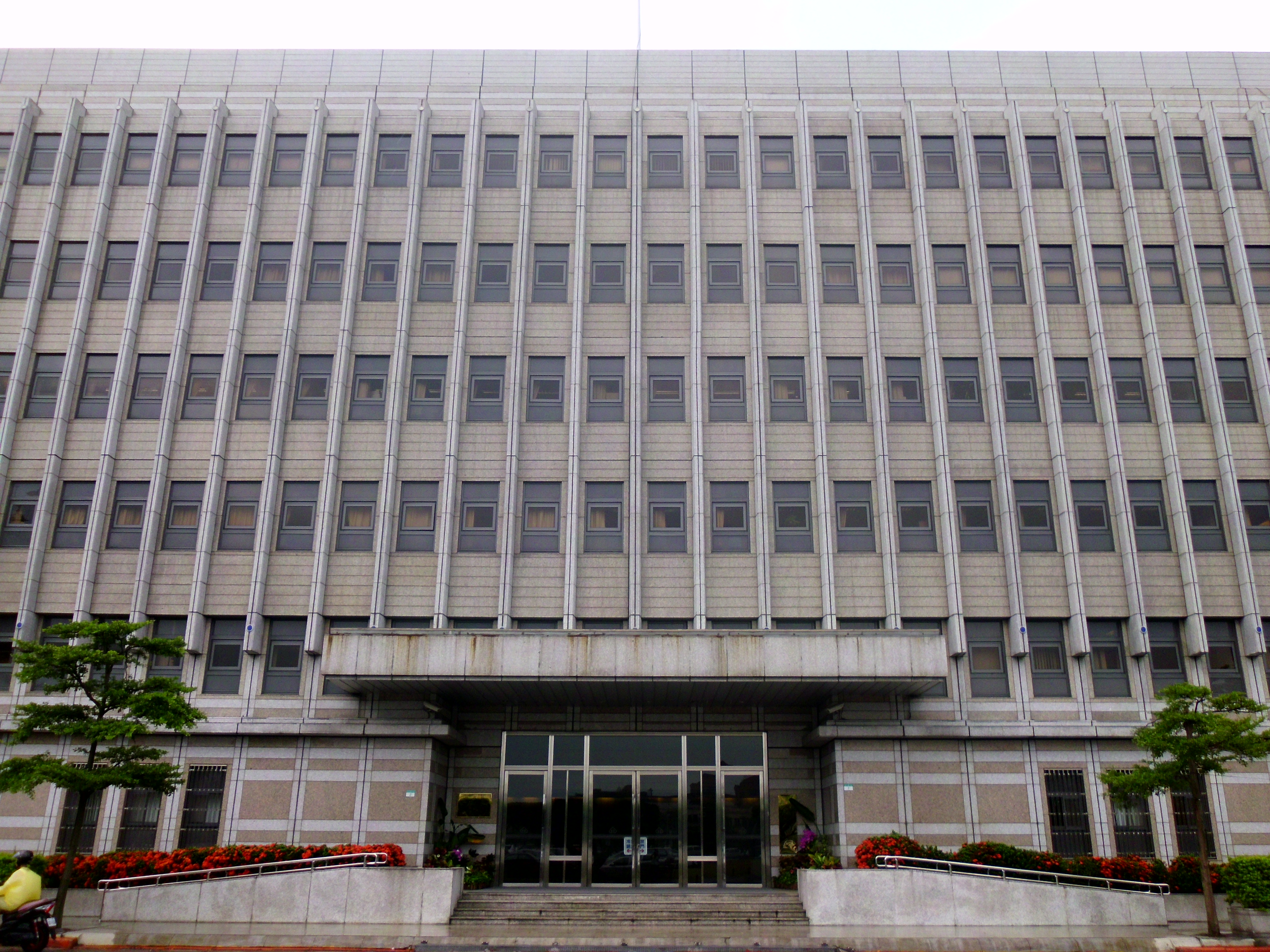

Agency overview
- Formed: 4 June 1948 (as Council for United States Aid); December 1977 (as CEPD)
- Dissolved: 21 January 2014
- Superseding agency: National Development Council
- Jurisdiction: Taiwan (ROC)
- Headquarters: Taipei City
- Parent agency: Executive Yuan
- Website: archive.cepd.gov.tw

The Council for Economic Planning and Development (CEPD; Chinese: 經濟建設委員會; pinyin: Jīngjì Jiànshè Wěiyuánhuì; Pe̍h-ōe-jī: Keng-chè Kiàn-siat Úi-oân-hōe) was a government agency responsible for drafting overall plans for national economic development in Taiwan (ROC). It also assessed development projects, proposals and programmes submitted to the Executive Yuan. It also coordinated the economic policy making activities of ministries and agencies and the monitoring the implementation of development projects, measures and programmes. The CEPD acted in an advisory role to the central government in formulating economic policies. The chairperson reported to the Minister and three Vice Ministers and one Secretary-General.

The members of the council included bureaucrats from other agencies. They included:

- Minister without portfolio, Executive Yuan
- Governor of the Central Bank
- Minister of Finance
- Minister of Economic Affairs
- Minister of Transportation and Communications
- Chairman of the Council of Agriculture
- Secretary General of the Executive Yuan
- Director General of the Directorate General of Budget, Accounting and Statistics, Executive Yuan
- Chairman of Public Construction Commission, Executive Yuan
- Chairperson of the Ministry of Labor

== History ==
The agency was established in 1948 as the Council for United States Aid (CUSA) which was established as part of the Sino-American Economic Aid Agreement signed between the Republic of China and the United States in the same year. In September 1963, CUSA was reformed as the Council for International Economic Cooperation and Development (CIECD) then as the Economic Planning Council (EPC) in 1973 to strengthen the planning and research functions of the Executive Yuan. In December 1977, the EPC was merged with the Finance and Economic Committee and reorganised as the CEPD to promote comprehensive national economic development. On 22 January 2014, CEPD was merged with Research, Development and Evaluation Commission to form the National Development Council.

== Structure ==
The internal structure of the agency was as follows:

- Department of Overall Planning
- Department of Economic Research
- Department of Sectoral Planning
- Department of Manpower Planning
- Department of Urban and Housing Development
- Department of Financial Analysis
- Department of Supervision and Evaluation
- Department of General Affairs
- Personnel Office
- Government Ethics Office
- Accounting Office
- Center for Economic Deregulation and Innovation

== Ministers ==
=== Council for United States Aid ===
- Weng Wenhao (4 June 1948 – 28 November 1948)
- Sun Fo (28 November 1948 – 12 March 1949)
- He Yingqin (12 March 1949 – 12 June 1949)
- Yan Xishan (12 June 1949 – 15 March 1950)
- Chen Cheng (15 March 1950 – 1 June 1954)
- Yu Hung-Chun (1 June 1954 – 22 August 1957)
- Yen Chia-kan (22 August 1957 – 15 July 1958)
- Chen Cheng (15 July 1958 – September 1963)

=== Council for International Economic Cooperation and Development ===
- Chen Cheng (September 1963 – 21 December 1963)
- Yen Chia-kan (21 December 1963 – 4 August 1969)
- Chiang Ching-kuo (4 August 1969 – 1 August 1973)

=== Economic Planning Council ===
- Chang Chi-cheng (1 August 1973 – 11 June 1976)
- Yang Chia-lin (11 June 1976 – 1 December 1977)

=== Council for Economic Planning and Development ===
- Yu Kuo-hwa (1 December 1977 – 1 June 1984)
- Chao Yao-tung (1 June 1984 – 22 July 1988)
- Fredrick Chien (22 July 1988 – 1 June 1990)
- Shirley Kuo (1 June 1990 – 27 February 1993)
- Vincent Siew (27 February 1993 – 14 December 1994)
- Hsu Li-teh (15 December 1994 – 10 June 1996)
- Chiang Pin-kung (10 June 1996 – 20 May 2000)
- Chen Po-chih (20 May 2000 – 1 February 2002)
- Lin Hsin-i (1 February 2002 – 20 May 2004)
- Hu Sheng-cheng (20 May 2004 – 21 May 2007)
- Ho Mei-yueh (21 May 2007 – 20 May 2008)
- Chen Tain-jy (20 May 2008 – 10 September 2009)
- Tsai Hsun-hsiung (10 September 2009 – 19 May 2010)
- Christina Liu (20 May 2010 – 6 February 2012)
- Yiin Chii-ming (6 February 2012 – 17 February 2013)
- Kuan Chung-ming (18 February 2013 – 21 January 2014)

== See also ==
- National Development Council (Taiwan)
- Economy of Taiwan
