= Order of Chiang Chung-Cheng =

Civilian order of the Republic of China (Taiwan)

Order of Chiang Chung-Cheng 中正勳章
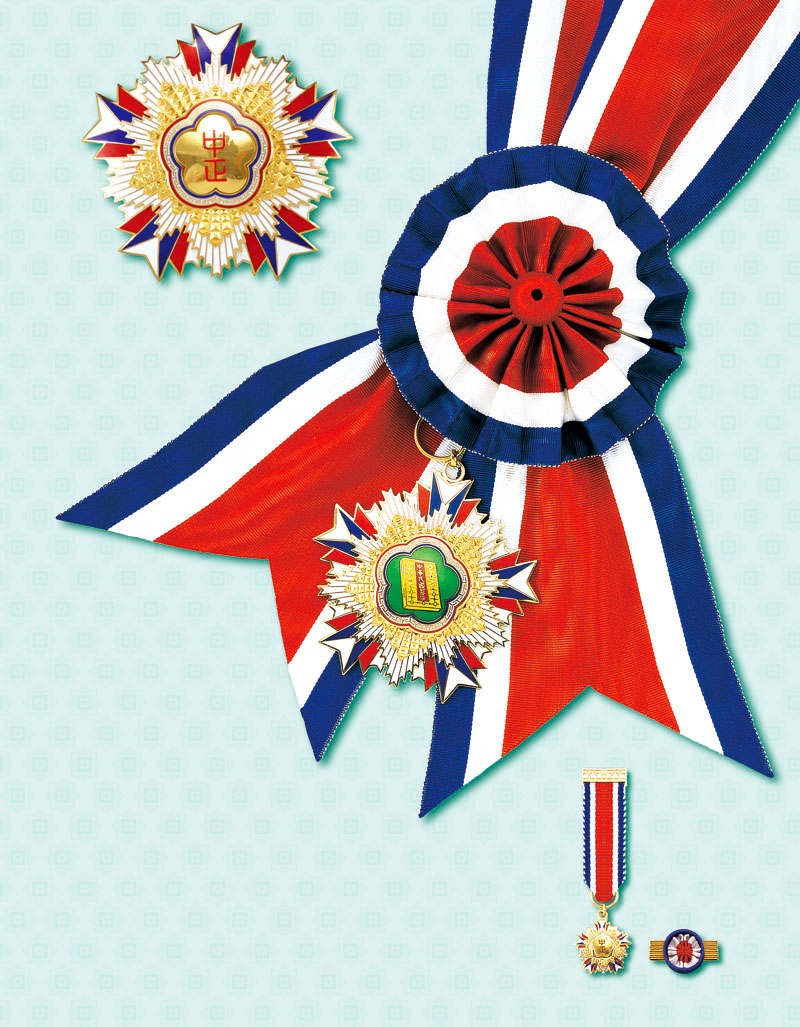
- Order of Chiang Chung-Cheng cordon, badge, star, medal and lapel pin
- Type: Single-grade Grand Cordon
- Description: The characters "Chung-cheng", the Chinese name of the late President Chiang Kai-shek, are inscribed on the main medal, while the accompanying medal has a picture of the ROC Constitution.
- Country: Republic of China (Taiwan)
- Presented by: President of the Republic of China (Taiwan)
- Eligibility: Civilian who had outstanding contributions to the Three Principles of the People, Anti-communism, Revival of Chinese Culture and constitutional democracy.
- Status: Active
- Established: 11 January 1980
- First award: Gu Zhutong
- Final award: Wu Den-yih

Highlights
- Total: 12
- Ribband of the order

Precedence
- Next (higher): Order of Dr. Sun Yat-sen
- Next (lower): Order of Propitious Clouds

The Order of Chiang Chung-Cheng is a civilian order of the Republic of China. The Chinese characters for "Chung-cheng", the Chinese name of President Chiang Kai-shek, are inscribed on the main medal, while the accompanying medal has a picture of the Republic of China Constitution. The order was instituted in 1980 and has no ranks. Abolition of the order has been discussed since 2017, and a moratorium on its conferral has been in place since then.

== Recipients ==
Date Awarded	Recipient	Service Awarded For
1981	Gu Zhutong	Strategy Advisor to the President
1982	Chang Dai-chien	Prodigious Chinese Artists
1987	Zhang Qun	Senior Advisor to the President
2000	Lien Chan	Vice President of the Republic of China
2005	Fredrick Chien	President of the Control Yuan
2007	Weng Yueh-sheng	President of the Judicial Yuan
2008	Chang Chun-hsiung	Premier of the Republic of China
2008	Wang Jin-pyng	President of the Legislative Yuan
2009	Liu Chao-shiuan	Premier of the Republic of China
2010	Lai In-jaw	President of the Judicial Yuan
2012	Vincent Siew	Vice President of the Republic of China
2016	Wu Den-yih	Vice President of the Republic of China
