= Chen Po-chih =

Taiwanese economist

- 陳博志
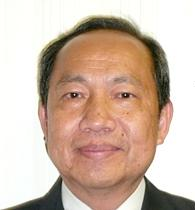

Minister of the Council for Economic Planning and Development of the Republic of China
- In office 20 May 2000 – 1 February 2002
- Preceded by: Chiang Pin-kung
- Succeeded by: Lin Hsin-i

Personal details
- Born: 1 February 1949 (age 77) Huwei, Yunlin, Taiwan
- Education: National Taiwan University (BA, PhD)

Chen Po-chih (Chinese: 陳博志; pinyin: Chén Bózhì; born 1 February 1949) is a Taiwanese economist. He was the Minister of the Council for Economic Planning and Development of the Executive Yuan from 20 May 2000 until 1 February 2002.
