= James Wei =

Taiwanese news media executive

- 魏景蒙
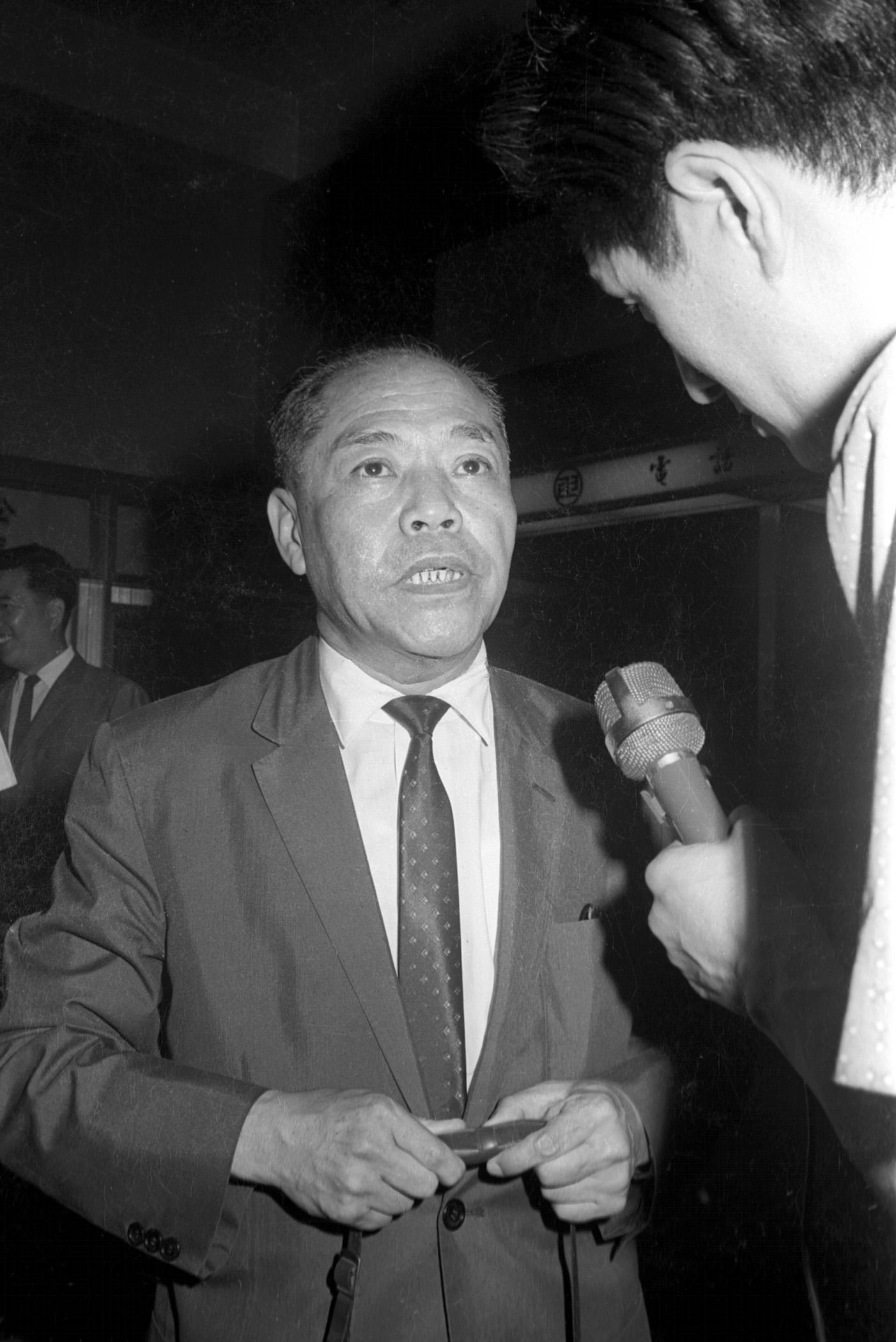
- James Wei (middle) in 1967

Minister of Government Information Office of the Republic of China
- In office November 1966 – June 1972
- Preceded by: James Shen
- Succeeded by: Fredrick Chien

Personal details
- Born: 28 August 1907 Hangzhou, Zhejiang, Qing dynasty
- Died: 7 October 1982 (aged 75) Beitou, Taipei, Taiwan
- Education: Yenching University

James Wei (Chinese: 魏景蒙; pinyin: Wèi Jǐngméng; 28 August 1907 – 7 October 1982) was a Taiwanese news media executive who led the Government Information Office from 1966 to 1972.

== Biography ==
=== Mainland China years ===
James Wei was born in Zhejiang on 28 August 1907, and he graduated from Yenching University in 1928. After graduating from university, he became a journalist for Tianjin Yong Bao (庸報) and North China Star (明星報). In 1938, Wei became a Special member of the Central Propaganda Department of the Chinese Kuomintang. In 1942, Wei began working for the Ministry of Information, the predecessor organization to what became known as the Government Information Office.

In 1946, he became a director of the Shanghai Office, the International Publicity Office of the Central Propaganda Department of the Chinese Kuomintang.(中國國民黨中央宣傳部國際宣傳處上海辦事處主任)

=== Taiwan years ===
He moved to Taiwan in 1949, and established the China News on 5 June 1949. The publication was later renamed Taiwan News. Alongside his role as the newspaper's founding publisher, Wei was also a Reuters correspondent and deputy director of the Central News Agency. Wei became the managing director of the Broadcasting Corporation of China in 1954, leaving the position to succeed James Shen as head of the Government Information Office in 1966. He accepted a promotion at the Central News Agency in 1972, serving as director until retirement in 1978. Wei remained an adviser to Chiang Ching-kuo until he died of a heart attack on 7 October 1982, at Taipei Veterans General Hospital.
