= Julie Tien =

Taiwanese politician

Julie Tian, or Tian Ling-ling or Julie Chien (Chinese: 田玲玲; born October 27, 1937), is the wife of Taiwanese politician and diplomat Frederick Chien. Tian graduated from the National Chengchi University with a bachelor's degree in English in 1960 and later on earned a master's degree in library science from the George Peabody College for Teachers.

During her husband's tenure as the Republic of China's representative to the United States, Tian presided over the restoration of the Twin Oaks, where she was an active hostess in Washington's social circles.

== Works ==
- 張慧英 Sheena H. Y. Chang, 田玲玲 Julie Tian (2006), 優雅的智慧-田玲玲的生活錦囊 [Elegant Wisdom] (in Chinese (Taiwan)), Commonwealth Publishing Group, ISBN 9864177559.
