= James Shen =

Chinese diplomat

- 沈劍虹
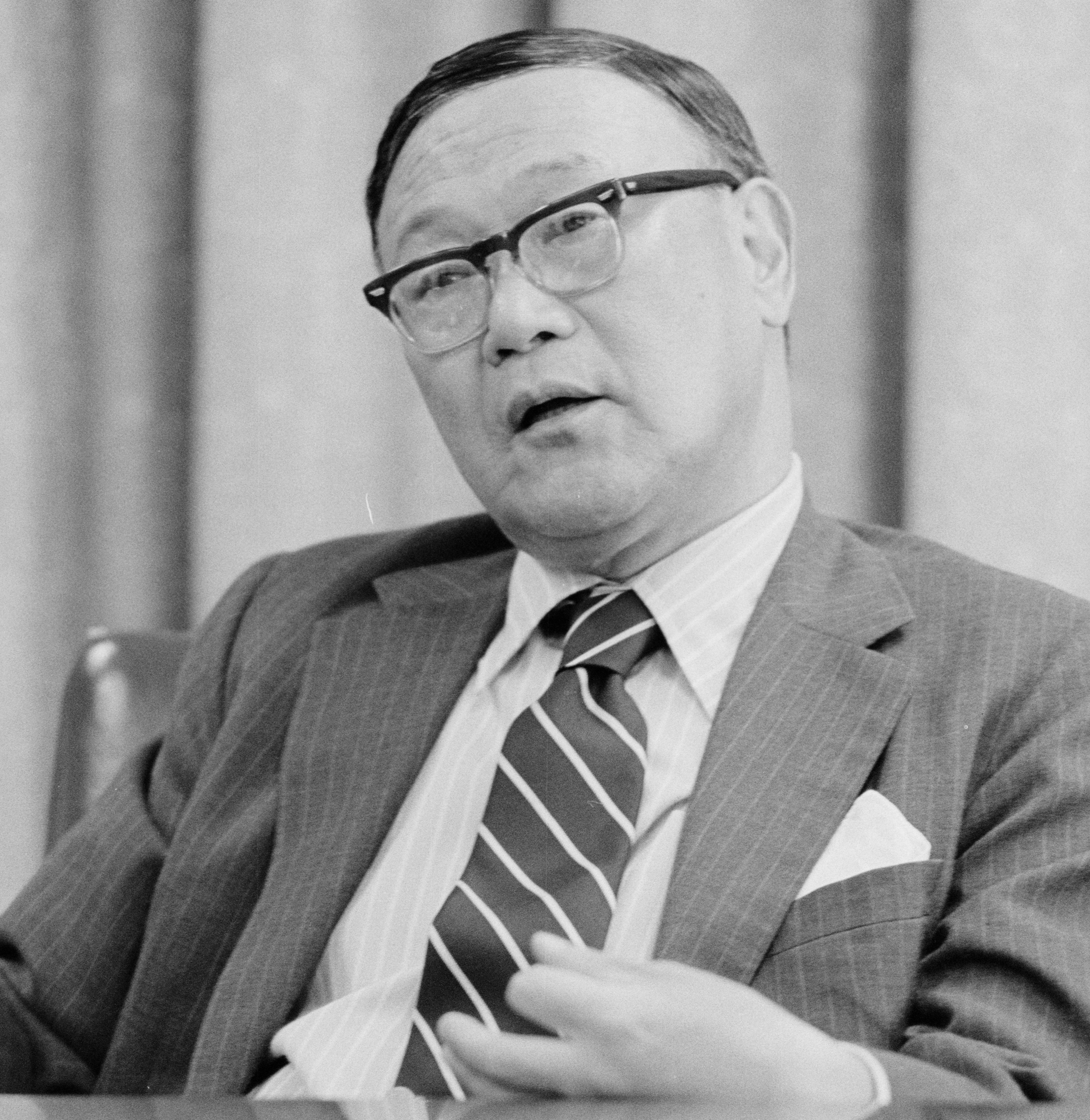
- Shen in 1976

ROC Representative to United States
- In office 1 January 1979 – 9 May 1979
- Preceded by: Position established
- Succeeded by: Shah Konsin

ROC Ambassador to United States
- In office 9 April 1971 – 31 December 1978
- Preceded by: Chou Shu-kai
- Succeeded by: Position abolished

Director of the Government Information Office
- In office July 1961 – November 1966
- Preceded by: Sherman Shen
- Succeeded by: James Wei

Personal details
- Born: 2 July 1909 Hongkew, Shanghai, Qing China
- Died: 12 July 2007 (aged 98) Taipei, Taiwan, Republic of China
- Party: Kuomintang
- Education: Yenching University; University of Missouri

James C.H. Shen (Chinese: 沈劍虹; pinyin: Shěn Jiànhóng; Wade–Giles: Shen Chien-hung; July 2, 1909, Shanghai – July 12, 2007, Taipei) was a Taiwanese diplomat. Shen served as the last official Republic of China ambassador to the United States before the U.S. switched its diplomatic recognition to the People's Republic of China in 1979.

== Early life ==
James Shen was born in Shanghai, Qing dynasty China, in 1909. Shen was educated at Yenching University, which was located in Beijing. He earned his master's degree in journalism at the University of Missouri in 1935.

Shen worked as a reporter and editor early in his career. He reported for media agencies throughout China, Taiwan and Hong Kong. He fled to Taiwan with the Nationalists when Chiang Kai-shek moved his government to Taipei following their defeat by Mao Zedong's Communist forces in 1949.

Additionally, Shen began work as an analyst and commentator for the Chinese government. His early government positions included "section chief" of the Ministry of Information's international department and as a department director for the Government Information Office (GIO). He also became the president of the then state-owned Central Motion Picture Corporation in 1963, and so has multiple film producer credits to his name.

== Diplomatic career ==
Shen served for a time as an English–Chinese language interpreter and secretary for Chinese Nationalist leader Chiang Kai-shek. He was then appointed spokesman for the Ministry of Foreign Affairs and head of the GIO.

Shen served as Taiwan's ambassador to Australia from 1966 until 1968 before returning to Taiwan to become vice minister of foreign affairs between 1968 and 1971.

Shen was appointed Republic of China ambassador to the United States in 1971. Shen arrived in Washington, D.C., to assume his post just months before U.S. President Richard Nixon visited mainland China on an official visit. While in China, Nixon signed a communiqué with Mao Zedong's government. The communique officially created the United States's One-China policy which acknowledged the People's Republic of China's position that there is but one China and Taiwan is part of China. The United States does not recognize the People's Republic of China's position and insists on the peaceful resolution of cross-strait differences, opposes unilateral changes to the status quo by either side, and encourages both sides to continue their constructive dialogue on the basis of dignity and respect.

Shen continued his efforts throughout the 1970s to persuade the United States to continue to recognize Taiwan and the Nationalists. The Nationalists and the United States had been important World War II and Cold War allies until the Nixon administration. Shen's diplomacy proved in vain. The United States, under President Jimmy Carter, officially severed diplomatic relations with Taiwan in 1979 as part of its One-China policy.

Shen returned to Taipei in January 1979 and retired. He wrote a highly critical book about the United States withdrawing its recognition of Taiwan, the event of which he was a first-hand witness. Shen died at his home in Taipei on July 12, 2007, following a lengthy illness. He was 98 years old and was survived by his wife, Wei-yi Shen.

Since 1979, Taiwan no longer maintains an embassy in the United States, since there are no official diplomatic relations between the two countries. However, Taiwan continues to operate a representative office in Washington D.C., called the Taipei Economic and Cultural Representative Office in the United States, with offices in twelve other American cities.
