= Chao Yao-tung =

Taiwanese economist

- 趙耀東

Minister of Council for Economic Planning and Development of the Republic of China
- In office 1 June 1984 – 22 July 1988
- Preceded by: Yu Kuo-hwa
- Succeeded by: Fredrick Chien

Minister of Economic Affairs of the Republic of China
- In office 1981–1984
- Preceded by: Chang Kwang-shih (張光世)
- Succeeded by: Hsu Li-teh

Personal details
- Born: 1916
- Died: 20 August 2008 (aged 91–92)
- Cause of death: Multiple organ dysfunction syndrome
- Education: Wuhan University (BS); Massachusetts Institute of Technology (MS)

Chao Yao-tung (Chinese: 趙耀東; 1916 – 20 August 2008) was a Taiwanese economist.

== Life and career ==
Chao was born in Jiangsu in 1916. He graduated from Wuhan University with a Bachelor of Science (B.S.) in mechanical engineering in 1940. He then completed graduate studies in the United States, where he earned a Master of Science (M.S.) from the Massachusetts Institute of Technology (MIT) in 1947.

In 1971, Chao helped found China Steel. He was the Minister of Economic Affairs from 1981 to 1984. Chao then served as chairman of the Council for Economic Planning and Development until 1988. Alongside Li Kwoh-ting, Chao became known for his influence on the Taiwan Miracle.

Chao Yao-tung died of multiple organ dysfunction syndrome on 20 August 2008, at the age of 92.
