= Shu Chien =

Chinese-American physiologist and bioengineer (born 1931)

- 錢煦
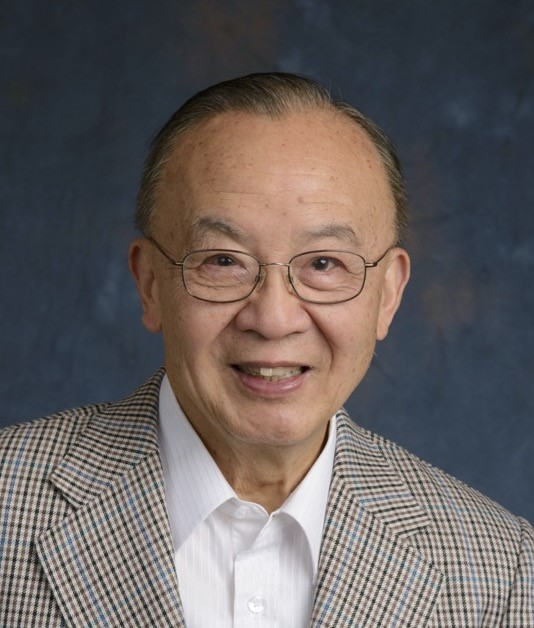
- Born: June 23, 1931 (age 95); Beijing, China
- Citizenship: United States
- Education: National Taiwan University (BS, MD); Columbia University (PhD)
- Known for: Fluid dynamics of blood flow Stem Cells
- Awards: National Medal of Science (2010); American Academy of Arts and Sciences (2006); National Academy of Engineering (1997); National Academy of Sciences (1994); Institute of Medicine (1993)
- Scientific career
- Fields: Bioengineering; Physiology
- Workplaces: University of California, San Diego
- Thesis: Quantitative evaluation of the circulatory adjustment of splenectomized dogs to hemorrhage (1958)

Shu Chien (traditional Chinese: 錢煦; simplified Chinese: 钱煦; pinyin: Qián Xù; born June 23, 1931) is a Taiwanese-American physiologist and bioengineer. His work on the fluid dynamics of blood flow has had a major impact on the diagnosis and treatment of cardiovascular diseases such as atherosclerosis. Chien is currently President of the Biomedical Engineering Society.

Chien was elected a member of the National Academy of Engineering in 1997 for research in blood rheology, microcirculation, cell mechanics, atherogenesis, and tissue engineering. He is one of only 11 scholars who are members of all three U.S. national institutes: the National Academy of Sciences, National Academy of Engineering, and the Institute of Medicine.

== Biography ==
Chien discussing his life and career.

Chien was born in Beijing and grew up in Shanghai. Chien's family are descendants of the royal family of the King Qian Liu of the Kingdom of Wuyue. His grandfather Chien Hong-ye (錢鴻業) was a Chief Justice in the Supreme Court of the Republic of China (in Shanghai). His father Chien Shih-Liang, a chemist, was former President of Academia Sinica. His elder brother Robert Chien (錢純) was former Minister of Finance of Taiwan, and former Secretary-general of Executive Yuan. His younger brother Fredrick Chien is also an influential politician in Taiwan. Shu Chien married Dr. Kuang-Chung Hu Chien in 1957.

From 1947 to 1948, Chien completed his medical preparatory study at Peking University Medical School. In 1949, Chien moved to Taiwan with his family. In 1953, Chien graduated from National Taiwan University. Chien went to study in the United States in 1954 and obtained his PhD in 1957 from Columbia University. Chien also received his M.D. from National Taiwan University.

From 1969 to 1988, Chien was a Professor of Physiology and Biophysics at Columbia University. Chien was a Founding Fellow of the American Institute for Medical and Biological Engineering in 1992.

Chien is current President (since 1991) of the Whitaker Institute of Biomedical Engineering at the University of California, San Diego (UCSD). Chien was the Chair of the Department of Bioengineering of UCSD from 1994 to 1999 and from 2002 to 2005. He is also the founding director of the Institute of Engineering in Medicine in July 2008. He was named as a recipient of the National Medal of Science by President Barack Obama on September 27, 2011, for "pioneering work in cardiovascular physiology and bioengineering".

=== 1967 Science Papers ===
In 1967 Chien published three papers in Science that advanced the understanding of the physics behind the flow of red blood cells. Chien and his colleagues were able to explore the flow properties of red blood cells through various experiments involved with filtering red blood cells through plastic porous sieves. One key finding was that the flow of red blood cells does not follow Newtonian behavior and this characteristic is fundamental in aiding red blood cells to squeeze through capillaries.

Chien and his colleagues further discovered the importance of the malleability of red blood cells to pass through tiny pores smaller than the cells' diameter. In other words, a healthy normal red blood cell is able to "squeeze" by deforming its shape and pass through small pores. In addition, this deformation helps lower the viscosity of blood and facilitate flow. Another important discovery that determines the viscosity of blood is the ability of red blood cells to aggregate to form rouleaux (like stacks of coins) due to their disc like shape. Chien and his colleagues discovered that this was a crucial factor in modulating viscosity and regulating blood flow and elucidated the mechanical, electrical and biochemical basis of this process. These discoveries show that the shape of red blood cells is not accidental, but rather a highly "engineered design" meant for efficient transportation.

=== Recent research ===
Chien has investigated the mechanisms by which mechanical forces such as pressure and flow regulate the behaviors of the cells in blood vessels, including the endothelial cells lining the vessel lumen and the smooth muscle cells in the vessel interior and their interactions. His work has led to the understanding how forces with a clear direction (as seen in the straight parts of the vascular tree) can protect the vessels from atherosclerosis and how forces without a clear direction (as seen in the branch points) make the vessels vulnerable to atherosclerosis. More recently, he has developed novel approaches to assess the optimum microenvironment for the growth and differentiation of stem cells.

=== Academic career ===
- 2008–2009, President of the Internal Society of Biorheology
- 2006–2008, President-Elect of the BMES Publications Board of Directors
- 2001–2002, President of the American Institute for Medical and Biological Engineering (AIMBE)
- 1992–1993, President of the Federation of American Societies for Experimental Biology
- 1990–1991, President of the American Physiological Society (APS). Chien is the 63rd President and the first Asian American President of APS.
- 1980–1981, President, The Microcirculatory Society
- Chairman of the steering committee of the North American Society of Biorheology
- President of the American Society of Chinese Medicine

== Honors and awards ==
- 2016 – Benjamin Franklin Medal in Mechanical Engineering
- 2012 – Columbia University Honorary Degree
- 2011 – National Medal Of Science, The White House
- 2006 – Founders' Award, National Academy of Sciences
- 2006 – Foreign Member, Chinese Academy of Sciences
- 2006 – Fellow, American Academy of Arts and Sciences
- 2005 – Member, National Academy of Sciences
- 2004 – Pierre Galletti Award, American Institute of Medical and Biological Engineering
- 1999 – National Health Medal, Department of Health, ROC
- 1998 – Lifetime Achievement Award, Chinese-American Engineers & Scientists Association of Southern California
- 1997 – Member, National Academy of Engineering
- 1996 – Melville Medal ASME
- 1994 – Member, Institute of Medicine, National Academy of Sciences
- 1992 – Founding Fellow, American Institute of Medical and Biological Eng.
- 1991 – Zweifach Award, Fifth World Congress for Microcirculation
- 1990 – Melville Medal ASME
- 1983 – Landis Award, Microcirculatory Society
- 1981 – The First Fahraeus Medal in Clinical Haemorheology
- 1980 – Nanci Medal for Research in Blood Rheology
- 1976 – Academician, Academia Sinica
