= I-Mei Foods =

Taiwanese food company

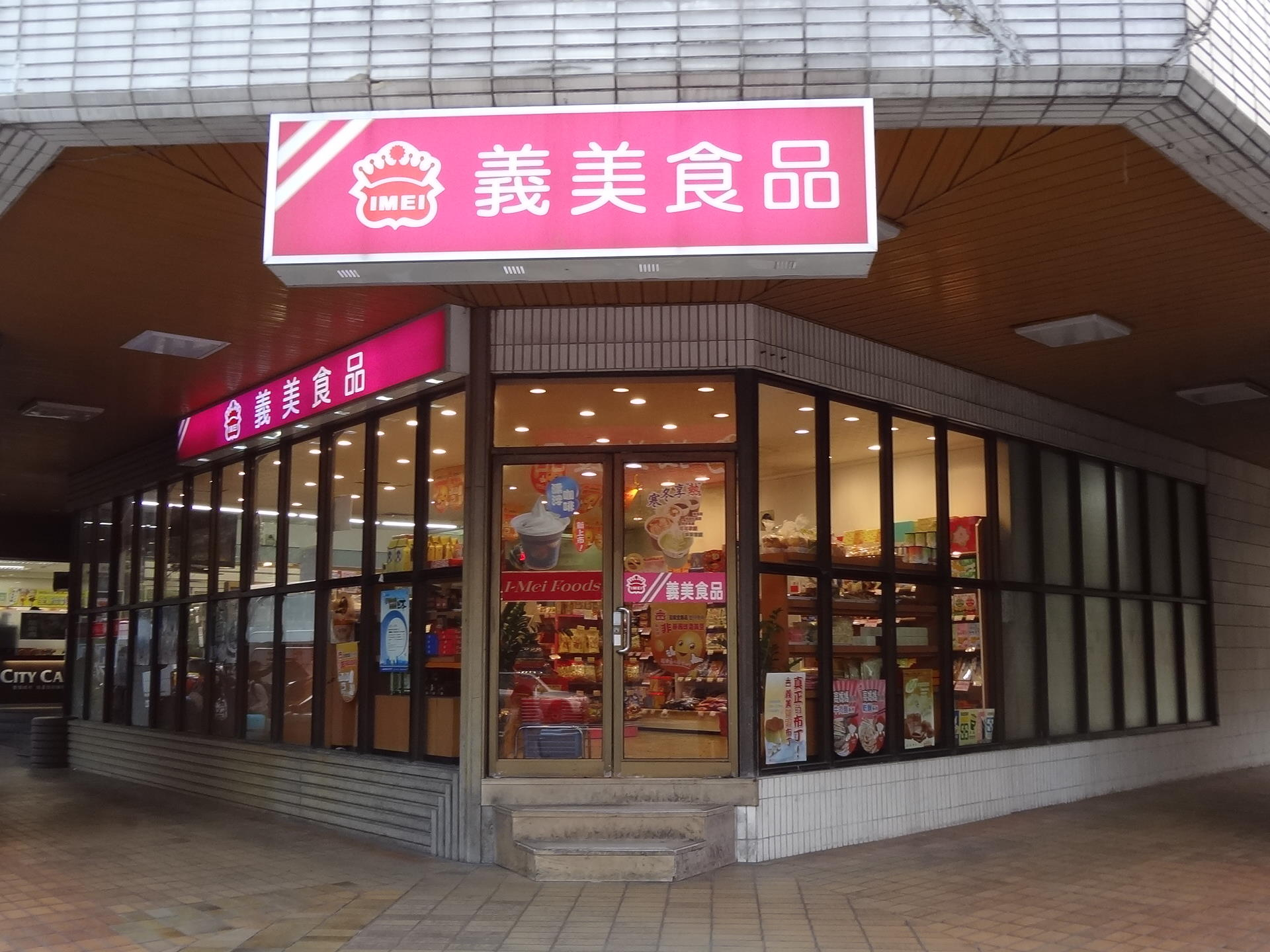
- Industry: Food
- Founded: 1934
- Headquarters: Taipei, Taiwan
- Key people: Henry Kao (Chairman)
- Products: Milk, dairy products, baked goods, snacks, candy
- Website: eng.imeifoods.com.tw

I-Mei Foods
- Chinese: 義美食品
Transcriptions
Standard Mandarin
- Hanyu Pinyin: Yì měi shípǐn

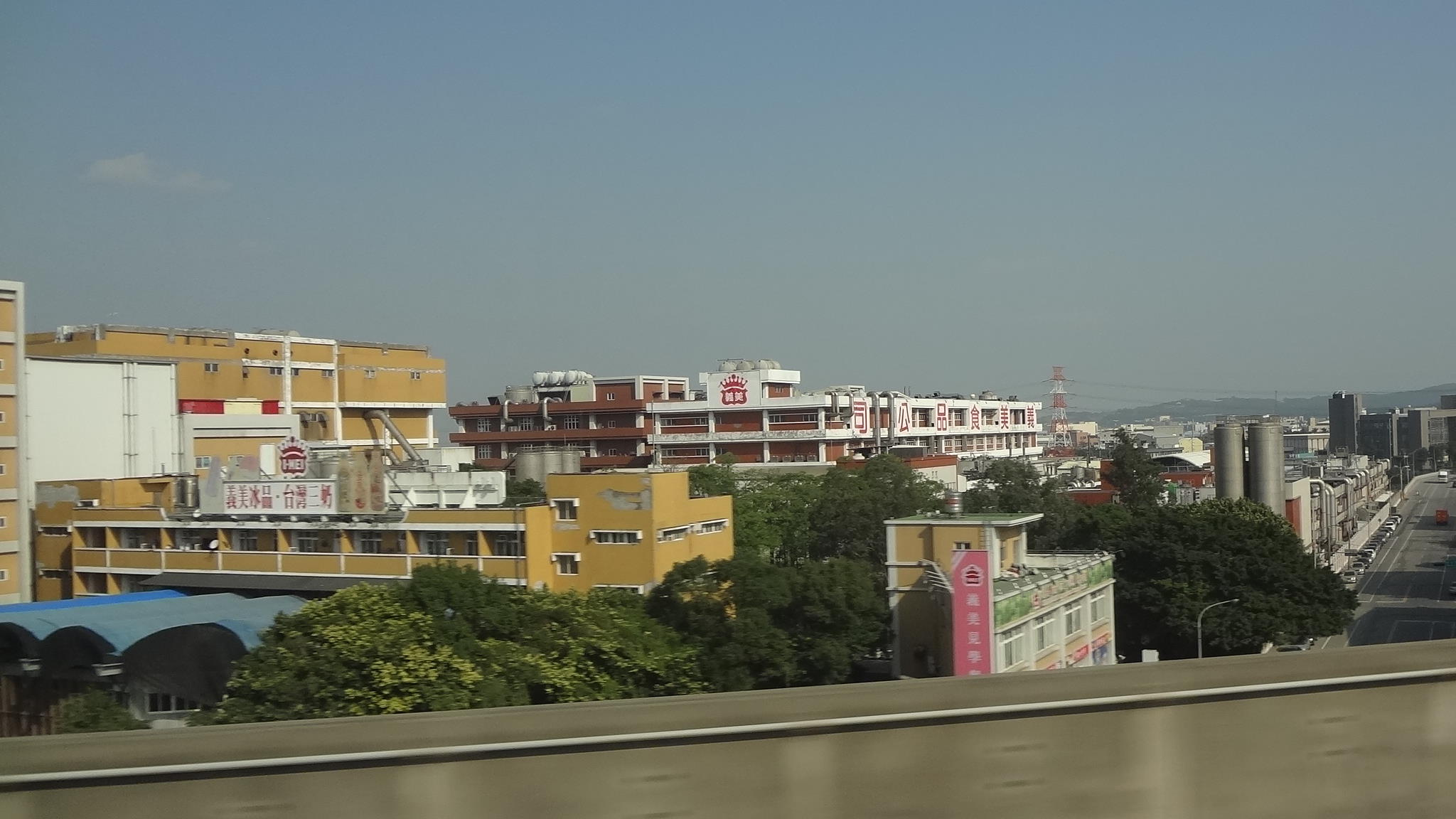
I-Mei Foods plant in Nankan, Taoyuan

I-Mei Foods (Chinese: 義美食品) is a Taiwanese food company founded in 1934. It is a well-known consumer brand in Taiwan and a major milk processor. I-Mei Foods Co was the top fast-moving consumer goods brand in Taiwan for 2022, its 9th consecutive year number one, with 90% of Taiwanese households having purchased an I-Mei product, according to a 2023 study by Kantar Group.

== History ==
I-Mei was founded as a traditional Taiwanese confectionery specializing in pineapple cakes and mung bean cakes. After World War II, they expanded finding success with a milk caramel. Based on the success of the milk caramel I-Mei expanded into the dairy industry in 1955. In the mid-1980s, it began supplying buns and dairy products to fast food chains like McDonald's, Burger King, KFC and MOS Burger.

In May 2019, Costco Taiwan pulled I-Mei brand fresh milk from the shelves after a few consumers on social media questioned the freshness of the milk. Milk products were returned to shelves after testing by the Health Department of Taoyuan City indicated that there was nothing off with the products.

In 2019, I-Mei celebrated its 85th birthday.

== Subsidiaries ==
- I-Mei Macrobiotics (義美生機)
- I-Mei Biomedicine (義美生醫)

=== I-Mei Gourmet Supplier ===
I-Mei Gourmet Supplier (義美吉盛) operates food courts in Taiwan. They operate three food courts in Taoyuan International Airport. As of 2019, Luis Ko (高志明) is the Chairman of I-Mei Gourmet Supplier.

=== Taiwan News ===
Taiwan News (formerly China News) is an English and Chinese-language online newspaper and former print newspaper in the Republic of China (Taiwan). It was purchased by I-Mei Foods in the 1997, who eventually transitioned the publication to a fully online venture. I-Mei also publishes the Chinese-language news weekly of the same name.

The publication has a roster of foreign and Taiwanese reporters. It has business partnerships with Media Outreach, PR Newswire, Reuters, and Report Ocean.

== See also ==
- List of companies of Taiwan
