= Tsai Hsun-hsiung =

Taiwanese urban planner, architect, and politician (born 1941)

- 蔡勳雄
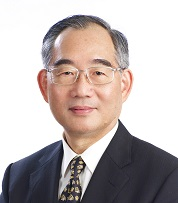

Minister of Council for Economic Planning and Development
- In office 10 September 2009 – 19 May 2010
- Preceded by: Chen Tain-jy
- Succeeded by: Christina Liu

Governor of Taiwan Province
- In office 20 May 2008 – 10 September 2009
- Preceded by: Lin Hsi-yao
- Succeeded by: Chang Jin-fu

Minister of the Environmental Protection Administration
- In office 10 June 1996 – 20 May 2000
- Preceded by: Chang Lung-cheng
- Succeeded by: Edgar Lin

Personal details
- Born: 23 June 1941 (age 84) Taiwan
- Party: Kuomintang
- Education: National Taiwan University (BS); Massachusetts Institute of Technology (MS); Princeton University (PhD)

Tsai Hsun-hsiung (Chinese: 蔡勳雄; pinyin: Cài Xūnxióng; born 23 June 1941) is a Taiwanese urban planner, architect and politician. He served as Minister of the Environmental Protection Administration from 1996 to 2000. Tsai was named the Governor of Taiwan Province in 2008 before being named the Minister of Council for Economic Planning and Development in 2009. He stepped down from the CEPD in 2010.

== Early life and education ==
Tsai was born in Taiwan on 23 June 1941. His family was a prominent landowning family in Changhua during the Japanese rule of Taiwan. When Tsai was a child, his father was imprisoned for being sympathetic to Marxism.

Tsai graduated from National Taiwan University with a Bachelor of Science (B.S.) in 1964 and completed advanced studies in the United States at the Massachusetts Institute of Technology (MIT), where he earned a Master of Science (M.S.) in urban studies and urban planning in 1974. Tsai then earned his Ph.D. in urban planning from Princeton University in 1979. His doctoral dissertation, completed under professor Chester Rapkin, was titled, "Housing investment and national policy: Expanding the private market to meet social needs of Taiwan".
