= Taiwan News =

Taiwanese online newspaper

- Type: Online newspaper
- Format: Online
- Owner: I-Mei Foods
- Publisher: Luis Ko
- Founded: 1949 (as China News, 1999 changed name)
- Political alignment: Pan-Green
- Headquarters: Taipei, Taiwan
- Website: www.taiwannews.com.tw

Taiwan News
- Traditional Chinese: 臺灣英文新聞
- Simplified Chinese: 台湾英文新闻
- Literal meaning: Taiwan English News
Transcriptions
Standard Mandarin
- Hanyu Pinyin: Táiwān Yīngwén Xīnwén
- Wade–Giles: T'ai-wan Ying-wen Hsin-wen

Alternative Chinese name
- Traditional Chinese: 英文臺灣日報
- Simplified Chinese: 英文台湾日报
- Literal meaning: English Taiwan Daily
Transcriptions
Standard Mandarin
- Hanyu Pinyin: Yīngwén Táiwān Rìbào
- Wade–Giles: Ying-wen T'ai-wan Jih-pao

China News
- Traditional Chinese: 英文中國日報
- Simplified Chinese: 英文中国日报
- Literal meaning: English China Daily
Transcriptions
Standard Mandarin
- Hanyu Pinyin: Yīngwén Zhōngguó Rìbào
- Wade–Giles: Ying-wen Chung-kuo Jih-pao

Taiwan News (formerly China News) is an English and Chinese-language online newspaper and former print newspaper in the Republic of China (Taiwan). It was purchased by I-Mei Foods in the 1997, who eventually transitioned the publication to a fully online venture. I-Mei also publishes the Chinese-language news weekly of the same name.

The publication has a roster of foreign and Taiwanese reporters. It has business partnerships with Media Outreach, PR Newswire, Reuters, and Report Ocean.

== Editorial position ==
Under the new ownership of I-Mei Foods, Taiwan News changed its editorial stance from being pro-KMT to being in favor of the Pan-Green coalition and Taiwan independence. According to former editor Anthony Lawrance, Taiwan News opposes autocracies and the People's Republic of China. In the late 1990s, Taiwan News rejected Chinese unification as advocated by the Kuomintang and associations of Taiwan with the People's Republic of China under the "one country, two systems" principle.

== History ==
China News was founded on 6 June 1949 in Taipei by James Wei, a journalist with close ties to the KMT and former employee of the Ministry of Information. The newspaper was established to cater for foreign residents and the local population in Taiwan. At the time it was the only English-language daily newspaper in Taiwan and it was a newspaper published in the afternoon. Later on, in order to compete with its new competitor, China News had to change and was published in the morning in order not to lose its advertisements.

In 1960, the newspaper switched to block printing in a full-size page format.

Wei left the newspaper in 1965. Wei was also a Reuters correspondent and deputy director of the Central News Agency. During his later years he was the sixth Director of the Government Information Office, serving from October 31, 1966, to June 1, 1972. Wei was a close advisor to Chiang Ching-kuo.

China News ran into financial difficulties in 1996 and received capital injection from I-Mei Foods, but the management of the newspaper was unchanged. In May 1999, I-Mei Foods acquired 50 percent stake in the newspaper for NTD$60 million (US$1.8 million). The newspaper's name was changed to Taiwan News to reflect the newspaper's new focus on readers in Taiwan and to avoid confusion with China Daily and China News Service. After the change in ownership, Taiwan News increased its page count and lowered staff wages. Under the ownership of I-Mei Foods, Simone Wei became the newspaper's chairperson and I-Mei CEO Kao Chih-ming became the publisher.

By 1998, 63 percent of Taiwan News' readership were local readers and the rest were businesspeople, diplomats, academics, teachers and students from outside Taiwan. Former editor Anthony Lawrance said in 2001 that Taiwan News mainly republished wire stories and had few articles with original reporting due to a lack of financial resources to hire English-speaking journalists and produce good translations from Chinese news articles, the high turnover of foreign editorial staff and the absence of an English speaking environment in Taiwan.

In 2010, Taiwan News went digital and simultaneously ended its weekly financial and cultural magazine. In 2015, Taiwan News became an all-digital publication when it ended all print editions.

== See also ==
- Media of Taiwan
