= Robert Chien =

Taiwanese politician (1929–2014)

Robert Chien, or Chien Chun (Chinese: 錢純; pinyin: Qián Chún; February 8, 1929 – March 2, 2014), was a Taiwanese economist and politician. Chien graduated from the National Taiwan University with a bachelor's degree in economics and later on earned a master's degree from the University of Minnesota. He was the Deputy Governor of the Central Bank of the Republic of China (1974–1985), Minister of Finance (1985-1988), and the Secretary-General of the Executive Yuan (1988-1989).

== Family ==
His father Chien Shih-Liang, a chemist, was a former president of Academia Sinica. His younger brother Shu Chien is a biologist and engineer, and youngest brother Fredrick Chien is an influential politician in Taiwan who served as the President of Control Yuan and Minister of Foreign Affairs.
