= Carl Chien =

Taiwanese businessman

- 錢國維
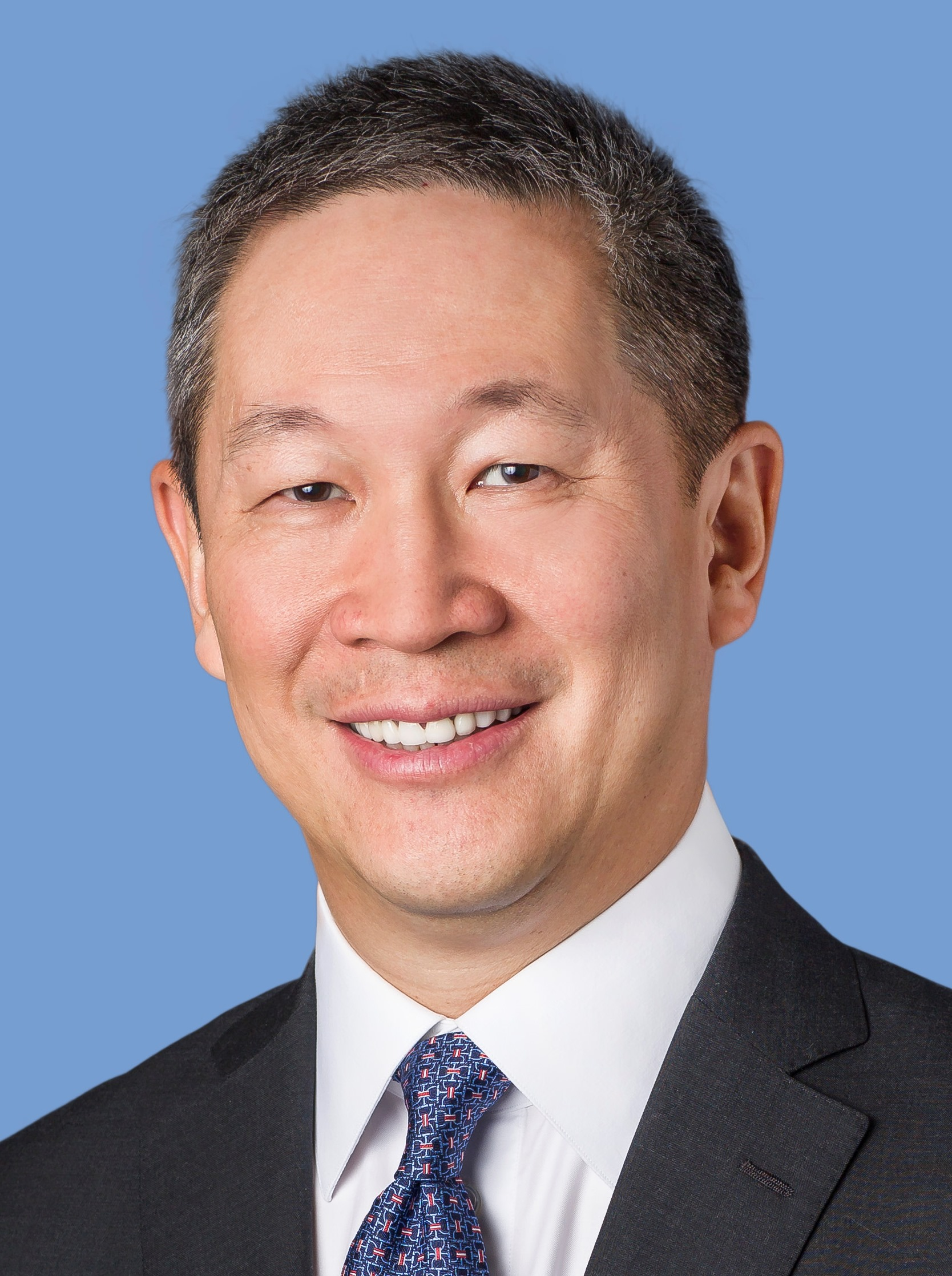
- Born: December 20, 1964 (age 61); Taipei, Taiwan
- Education: Georgetown University (BA, MBA)
- Occupations: Vice Chairman Asia Pacific and CEO Taiwan, J.P. Morgan

Carl Chien
- Traditional Chinese: 錢國維
Transcriptions
Standard Mandarin
- Hanyu Pinyin: Qián Guówéi
- Wade–Giles: Chien Kuo-wei

Carl Chien (born 20 December 1964) is a Taiwanese businessman. He is currently the Vice Chairman of Asia Pacific at J.P. Morgan and a member of the bank’s Asia Pacific Management Committee, responsible for building and fostering senior client relationships throughout 17 markets in the region. He is also the Chief Executive Officer for J.P. Morgan Taiwan. Carl represents J.P. Morgan in international conferences including the Boao Forum for Asia, APEC Business Council, and Summer World Economic Forum.

Carl joined J.P. Morgan in 2002 to lead the firm’s Taiwan franchise. In 2015, Chien was named a head of greater China banking, alongside David Li. In 2017, Chien was named vice chairman for J.P. Morgan Asia-Pacific.

Carl has an MBA in International Commerce & Finance from Georgetown University, Washington D.C.
