= Presidency of Ma Ying-jeou =

2008–2016 ROC presidential administration

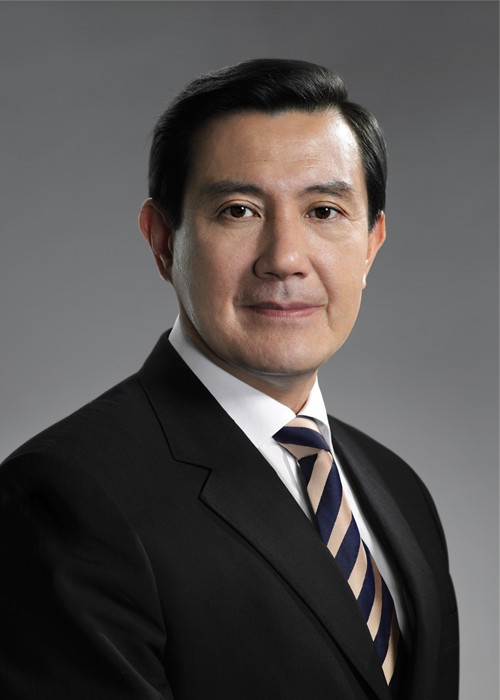
- Presidency of Ma Ying-jeou; 20 May 2008 – 20 May 2016
- President: Ma Ying-jeou
- Vice President: Vincent Siew; Wu Den-yih
- Premier: See list: Liu Chao-shiuan Wu Den-yih Sean Chen Jiang Yi-huah Mao Chi-kuo Chang San-cheng
- Cabinet: See list: Liu; Wu; Chen; Jiang; Mao; S. Chang
- Party: Kuomintang (KMT)
- Election: 2008; 2012
- Seat: Wanli Residence, Zhongzheng, Taipei

The presidency of Ma Ying-jeou began on 20 May 2008, when Ma Ying-jeou was sworn in as 11th president of the Republic of China and the sixth president of the republic since it became established on the island of Taiwan, succeeding Chen Shui-bian. Ma won the 2008 Taiwanese presidential election on 22 March 2008 with 58% of the vote, ending eight years of DPP rule and becoming officially recognized as the sixth president of the Republic of China. Ma won with 7,659,014 votes against DPP nominee Frank Hsieh's 5,444,949 votes. Ma's overwhelming victory in the presidential election gave him political mandate to make changes in Taiwan.

== Presidency ==
=== Inauguration ===
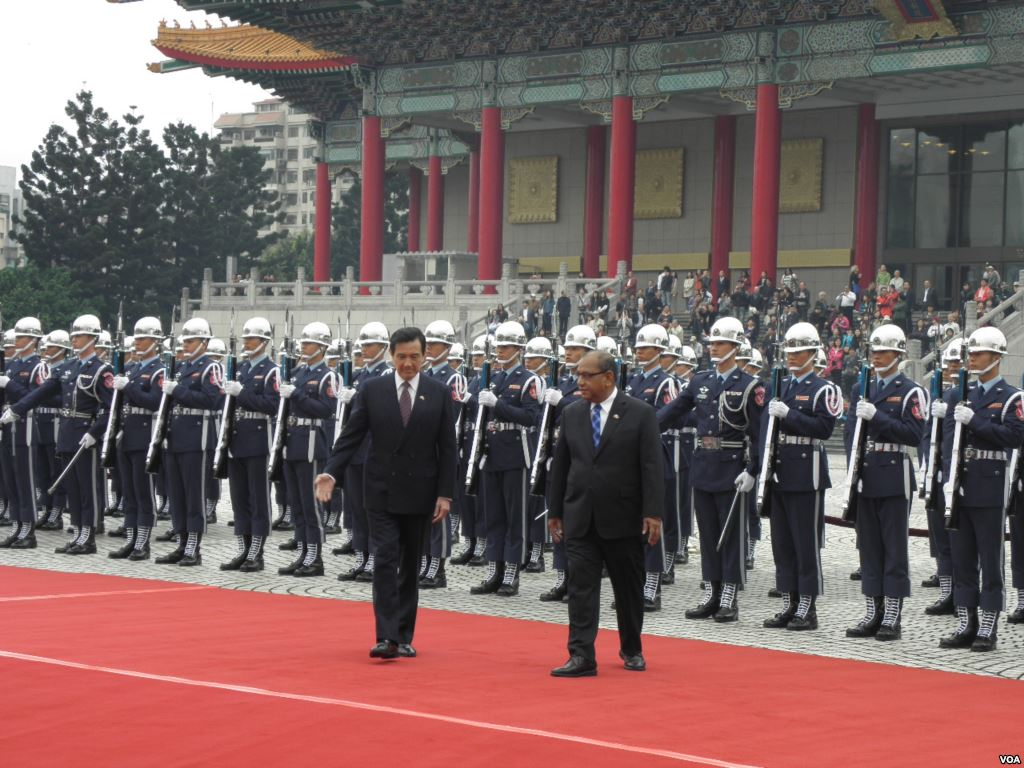
Marshall Islands' President Christopher Loeak visits Ma at the Chiang Kai-shek Memorial Hall.

Ma took office on 20 May 2008. The inaugural ceremony took place in the Taipei Arena in Taipei. A state dinner took place in Kaohsiung the same day.

Ma was named among the 2008 Time 100 in its "Leaders & Revolutionaries" section. He is described by Time as "one of those rare politicians who have an opportunity to shape the destiny not only of their own nation but also of an entire region".

On 12 August 2008, Ma embarked on his first foreign trip as president. Ma's visit centered upon improving relations with Taiwan's Latin American allies. He attended the inaugurations of both Leonel Fernández of the Dominican Republic and Fernando Lugo of Paraguay. Ma also made a stop at Panama and met with President Martín Torrijos. There was an emphasis that there would be no new aid packages during the visits; if any new economic aid were to be announced, they would be announced from Taiwan and not from abroad. The trip included U.S. stop-overs in Los Angeles, Austin, and San Francisco. Ma's trip across the Pacific was via commercial flight and only chartered a smaller jet from the United States; he was accompanied by an 81-member delegation.

=== Cross-strait relations ===
After his success in the presidential election, Ma Ying-jeou said he had no immediate plans to visit mainland China and would work to fulfill his campaign pledge to improve relations with mainland China, starting direct charter flights, allowing mainland Chinese tourists to visit Taiwan and lifting the ROC's legislative restrictions on the financial sector to invest in mainland China. Ma, in his inaugural address, laid out his promise in dealing with cross-strait relations that there would be "no reunification, no independence, and no war" (不統, 不獨, 不武) during his tenure as president. Critics argue that Ma, rather than follow his campaign promise, has been following his father's will instead, where Ma Ho-ling clearly states his final words were "Repress independence supporters; Lead (Taiwan) to unification." During an interview in England in 2006, Ma affirmed that his goal was to lead Taiwan to "eventual unification".

An article published in the 11 August 2008 edition of the Time magazine said that in less than three months' time, "relations between Taiwan and PRC have arguably seen the most rapid advancement in the six-decade standoff between the two governments. Ma launched direct weekend charter flights between PRC and Taiwan for the first time, opened Taiwan to mainland Chinese tourists, eased restrictions on Taiwan investment in mainland China and approved measures that will allow mainland Chinese investors to buy Taiwan stocks." l

During the Second Chen–Chiang summit visit by Chen Yunlin on 3 November 2008, chairman of the Beijing-based Association for Relations Across the Taiwan Straits (ARAT), the opposition Pan-Green Coalition criticized the visit as "taking steps toward eventual reunification" and damaging Taiwan's sovereignty. Opposition to the visit by the chairman of the ARAT also sparked massive peaceful rallies and protests organised by the opposition DPP party on 25 October 2008. Preliminary estimates place the number of protesters at around 500,000. Protesters accused Taiwanese President Ma Ying-jeou "of making too many concessions and moving too fast in relaxing restrictions on trade and investment with China." Government's polls have suggested that Chen Yunlin's visit and the government's policy of normalising cross-strait relations have support of 50% to 60% of the Taiwanese population.

Chen's visit was the highest level visit from mainland China to Taiwan that had taken place since the Chinese Civil War in 1949. Chen was expected to meet with his Taipei-based counterpart, Chiang Pin-kung beginning on 4 November 2008. The two sides signed four agreements on 5 November, detailing the loosening of restrictions with regards to air, marine, and postal links as well as better regulations on food safety. The Ma government refused to disclose the treaties only until days before they went into effect.

During Chen's visit in Taipei, he was met with a series of strong protests directed at himself and Ma Ying-jeou, some of which were violent, with Molotov cocktails being thrown by the protesters at riot police. A series of arrests were made after the protests, with a secret letter being sent from the police to a member of the media. Local police reported that 149 of its officers were injured during the opposition protests. Chen referred to Ma simply as "Mr. Ma," not as "President". However, this is consistent with the previous convention in 2008, when KMT ex-politician Lien Chan met PRC leader Hu Jintao in Peru. Lien did not call Hu Jintao "President," but instead used his title "General Secretary" as the leader of the Chinese Communist Party (CCP) and the top position in PRC government.

After the chaos during and after Chen's visit, college students and professors launched a peaceful sitout, known as the Wild Strawberry student movement (Chinese: 野草莓運動), demanding a more reasonable assembly law and a stop to police violence. A few days into the sitout, the prime minister Liu Chao-shiuan accidentally spoke of his opinion during an interview on air that he did not think the movement would last more than three days, angering students, professors, and the general public. In the end, the sitout lasted one month. Then, it moved into an organizational direction. However, the polls in two of Taiwan's biggest newspapers after the visit still reported that about 70% of the Taiwanese public considered Chen's visit to have a positive effect on Taiwan's development, while 22% of the respondents thought the effect would be negative, with the remaining 8% not expressing an opinion. The Pan-Green caucus have continuously alleged this result being a form of media manipulation by the KMT. However, other major polls in Taiwanese newspapers and news websites have shown similar results regardless of political alignment.

A free trade agreement with China was signed in 2010 called the Economic Cooperation Framework Agreement (ECFA), which was accompanied by a debate and protests. Ma attempted to pass the Cross-Strait Service Trade Agreement in his second term, building on the ECFA. This sparked the Sunflower Student Movement, initiated by a coalition of students and civic groups in the Legislative Yuan and later also the Executive Yuan. On 26 September 2014, a student protester hurled the book Formosa Betrayed at Ma and hit the president, who was not hurt by the incident. The Presidential Office condemned the act of violence.

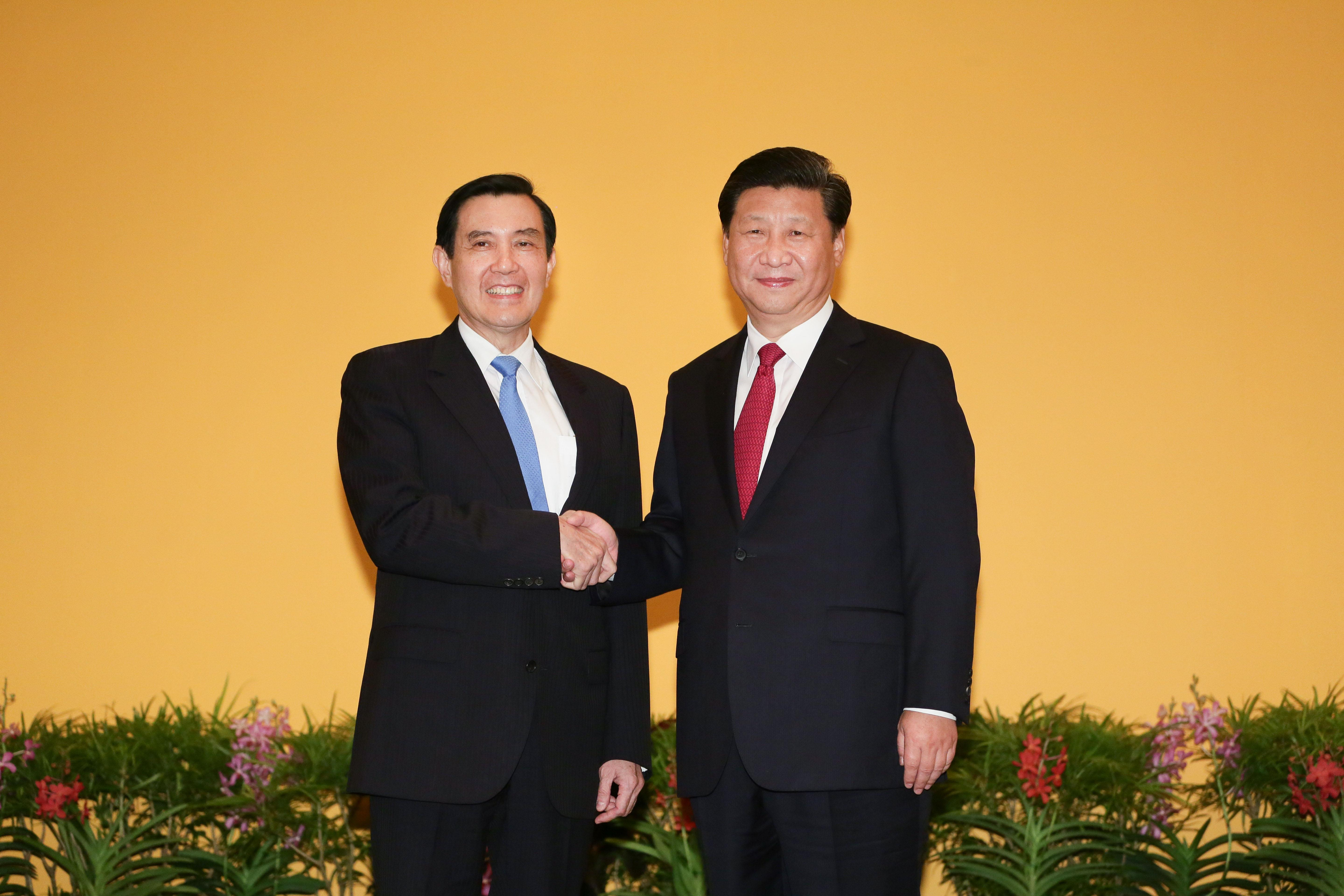
Ma Ying-jeou met with Mainland top leader Xi Jinping in November 2015 in their capacity as the leader of Taiwan and Mainland China respectively.

On 7 November 2015, Ma met and shook hands with the Chinese Communist Party General Secretary Xi Jinping in Singapore within their capacity as Leader of Taiwan and Leader of Mainland China respectively. The meeting marked the first ever meeting between leaders of both sides since the end of Chinese Civil War in 1949. Both leaders addressed each other using the honorific xiānshēng (Chinese: 先生, "Mister").

==== Direct links policy ====
On 15 December 2008, Taiwan and mainland China resumed direct sea, air, and mail links, ending an almost six-decade-long ban between the two sides on such trips. Previous flights between the two regions required a connection in Hong Kong. As many as 108 flights per week as well as 60 cargo flights per month were scheduled, evenly divided between Taiwanese and mainland Chinese airlines.

Shipping companies, due to shorter voyages and time savings, are able to save up to US$120 million (TWD $4 billion) each year. Previously, shipping companies from both sides of the strait were required to reroute their ships into third-country waters. The two sides also agreed that neither the ROC nor the PRC flag will be displayed when a ship enters port.

In July 2009, Ma rejected the proposal to open the airspace of the Taiwan Strait to accommodate higher passenger traffic, citing that the Taiwan Strait airspace is important to Taiwanese security.

=== Economic issues ===
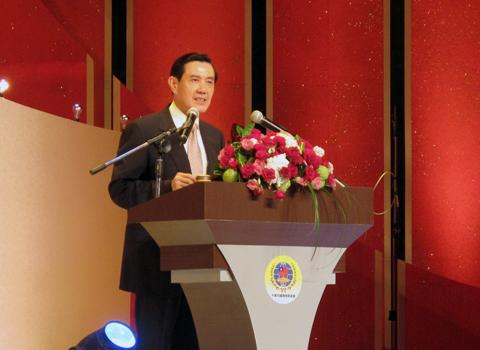
Ma in 2010 during the Double Ten Day celebrations

One of Ma's promises as presidential candidate was called the "633 Plan", which promised economic growth rate of 6%, unemployment rate of less than 3%, and per capita income of more than US$30,000. At the time, the high unemployment rate (~4.06% in July) and consumer price index three months after Ma's inauguration were unprecedented, having not been seen in 28 years.

The economic downturn caused about 2,000 companies in Taiwan to go bankrupt in the six months following Ma's inauguration, according to a governmental commercial office in Taipei. The Taiwan Stock Exchange also fell to two-year lows in September 2008.

On 11 September 2008, Ma's cabinet unveiled a $5.6-billion USD ($180-billion TWD) economic stimulus package. Among the items of the package were infrastructure projects, economic incentives to small businesses, and other tax cuts. Stock transaction taxes were also halved for the next six months. Taiwan's economy was projected to grow 4.3% in 2008, down from 5.7 in 2007, according to Fitch Ratings.

Although an economic stimulus plan was introduced, Taiwan stocks still closed lower on 11 September 2008. The Financial Times describes Taiwan's economic downturn as results from "downward pressure driven by global factors". Analysts also point out that, "during its first 100 days in office, the government has made a series of bold steps to deregulate economic Cross-Strait ties. But as these policies coincided with the global downturn and foreign investors had already bought Taiwan stocks heavily before the election, betting on the reforms, the island's market has seen a sell-off worse than the regional average." Taiwan's government reported that the economy contracted 8.36 percent during the last three months of 2008. Taiwan's economy rebounded by growing 10% in 2010.

=== Bid for KMT leadership ===
Ma Ying-jeou registered as the sole candidate for the election of the KMT chairman on 25 June 2009 and won the next day with 93.87% of the vote. Ma inaugurated as the chairman of the Kuomintang on 12 September 2009. This would have allowed Ma to be able to meet with People's Republic of China (PRC) paramount leader Hu Jintao (at the time the CCP general secretary) and other PRC delegates, as he would be able to represent the KMT as the leader of a Chinese political party, rather than as head-of-state of a political entity unrecognized by the PRC. Ma, however, ruled out meeting his PRC counterpart Hu Jintao in a 14 July 2009 interview with Taiwan's Commercial Times newspaper. In the interview, Ma states, "A meeting in the capacity of a party chairman will not solve the problem because other people would still insist that I meet him as the president."

=== Typhoon Morakot ===
Typhoon Morakot, the worst typhoon to strike Taiwan in fifty years, hit Taiwan on 8 August 2009. In the storm's aftermath, President Ma was criticized for his handling of the disaster by both sides of Taiwan's political spectrum. Many news outlets likened Typhoon Morakot to being Ma's "Hurricane Katrina." Editorials and political commentators accused Ma of, among other charges, poor leadership and poor crisis management. Many critics believe that hundreds of lives could have been spared, had the Ma administration been aware of the typhoon's seriousness. Taiwan's political commentators were most critical of Ma's refusal to declare a state of emergency and fully mobilize the military. Instead, Ma Ying-jeou blamed the local governments, which were under the control of the DPP in Southern Taiwan, for not having the villagers evacuated earlier. Ma's approval ratings sank from 52% (in May) to 29% in a United Daily News poll. In an August 2009 CNN online poll, 82% of respondents wanted Ma to resign. An editorial piece lambasted Ma, saying, "[Ma] has been distant and arrogant, and he has only made [victims] more angry instead of comforting them...He has not shown decisiveness required in a leader when facing a sudden disaster."

Following pressure from the opposition, Ma took steps to publicly apologize for his government's failure to respond swiftly with rescue and recovery efforts. Ma cancelled 2009's Double Ten Day national celebrations and his state visit to the Solomon Islands for the Third Taiwan-South Pacific summit. A probe was launched to investigate why government response was slow and inadequate, and vice foreign minister Andrew Hsia tendered his resignation to Ma's premier, Liu Chao-shiuan. Defense minister Chen Chao-min also resigned before Liu himself stepped down.

Another controversy arose in the disaster's aftermath involved a document leaked from the Ministry of Foreign Affairs that instructed the ROC embassies and representative offices to turn down aid from foreign nations. Vice Foreign Minister Andrew Hsia made an explanation, saying that it was meant to say "presently" foreign aids were not needed, but nevertheless took the blame and offered to resign. However, critics were convinced that Hsia's resignation was only to cover-up the fact that Ma gave the order to turn down foreign aid.

== Administration ==
=== Cabinets ===
Succession	Picture	Name	Political party	Term	Vice-Premier	Notes
1		Liu Chao-shiuan	KMT	20 May 2008 – 10 September 2009	Paul Chiu	
2		Wu Den-yih	KMT	10 September 2009 – 6 February 2012	Eric Chu Sean Chen	
3		Chen Chun (Sean Chen)	KMT	6 February 2012 – 18 February 2013	Jiang Yi-huah	
4		Jiang Yi-huah	KMT	18 February 2013 – 8 December 2014	Mao Chi-kuo	
5		Mao Chi-kuo	KMT	8 December 2014 – 1 February 2016	Chang San-cheng	
6		Chang San-cheng (Simon Chang)	Independent	1 February 2016 – 20 May 2016	Woody Duh	
