= Tien Chiu-chin =

Taiwanese politician

Tien Chiu-chin MLY
- 田秋堇
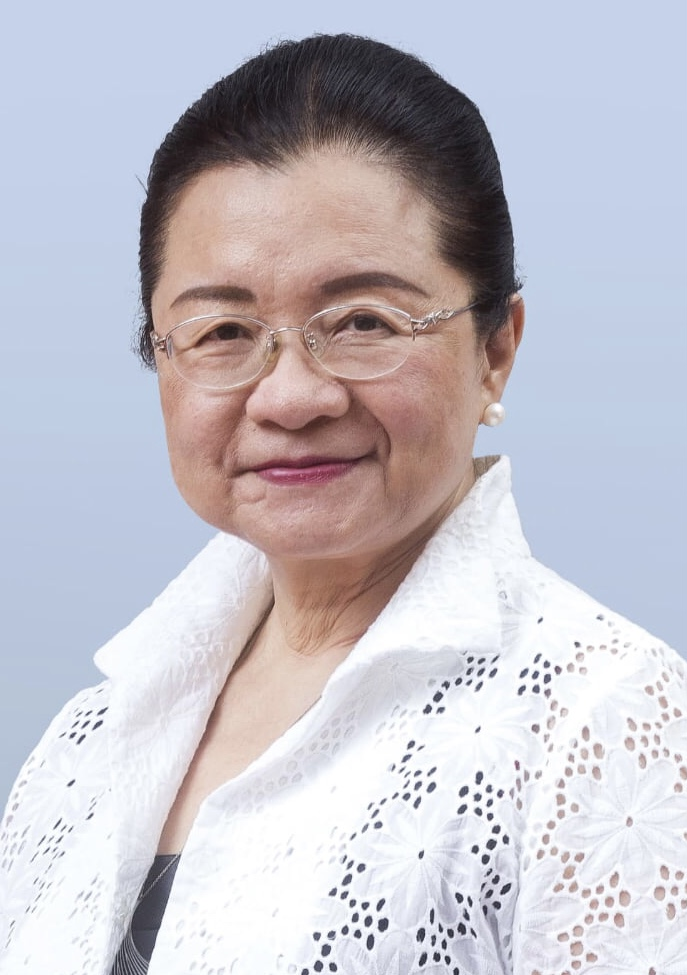

Member of the Control Yuan
- Incumbent
- Assumed office 24 January 2018

Deputy Minister of the Overseas Community Affairs Council of the Republic of China
- In office 20 May 2016 – June 2018
- Minister: Wu Hsin-hsing
- Vice: Roy Leu
- Succeeded by: Kao Chien-chih

Member of the Legislative Yuan
- In office 1 February 2005 – 31 January 2016
- Constituency: Republic of China

Personal details
- Born: 27 May 1954 (age 72) Taipei, Taiwan
- Party: Democratic Progressive Party
- Education: National Taiwan University (BA)

Tien Chiu-chin (Chinese: 田秋堇; pinyin: Tián Qiūjǐn; born 27 May 1954) is a Taiwanese politician. She served in the Legislative Yuan from 2005 to 2016, and later that year became the deputy minister of the Overseas Community Affairs Council. Tien was nominated a member of the Control Yuan in 2018.

== Education and early career ==
Tien graduated from National Taiwan University with a bachelor's degree in philosophy. She was close to Lin Yi-hsiung, and worked as his secretary.

== Political career ==
Tien won three straight elections on the Democratic Progressive Party party-list proportional representation ticket in 2004, 2008, and 2012. She was named deputy minister of the Overseas Community Affairs Council in 2016, and nominated by the Tsai Ing-wen presidential administration to the Control Yuan in March 2017. During her legislative confirmation hearing in January 2018, she expressed conditional agreement to the abolition of the Control Yuan. Tien's nomination, alongside ten others, was approved by the Legislative Yuan, as the Democratic Progressive Party held a majority. Tien was renominated to the Control Yuan in June 2020.
