= Simon Chang cabinet =

Cabinet in Taiwan (2016)

- 47th premiership of the Republic of China

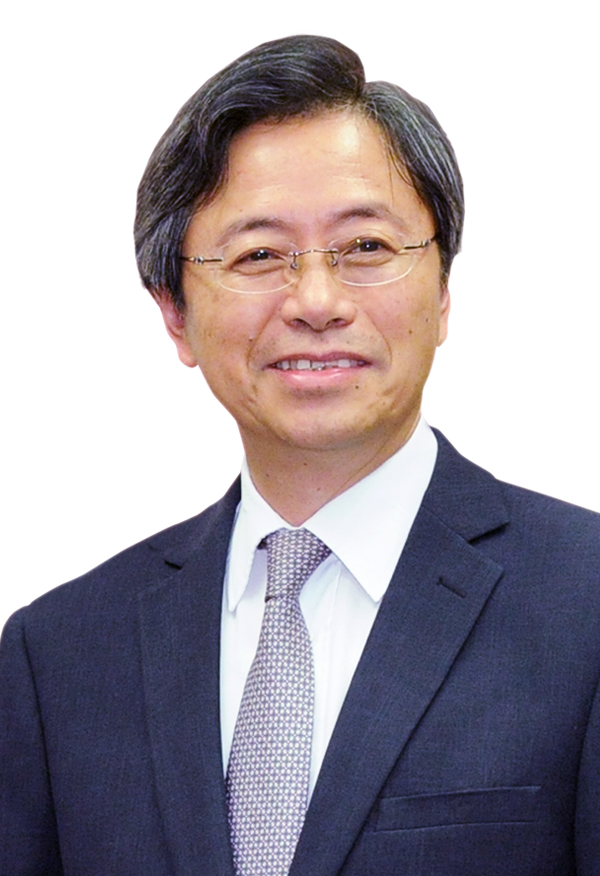
- Date formed: 1 February 2016
- Date dissolved: 20 May 2016

People and organisations
- Head of state: Ma Ying-jeou
- Head of government: Simon Chang
- Head of government's history: Vice Premier (2014–16)
- Deputy head of government: Woody Duh
- Member parties: KMT
- Status in legislature: Minority government
- Opposition parties: DPP
- Opposition leader: Tsai Ing-wen

History
- Legislature term: 8th Legislative Yuan
- Predecessor: Mao Chi-kuo cabinet
- Successor: Lin cabinet

Simon Chang cabinet refers to the Government of the Republic of China (Taiwan) from 1 February to 20 May 2016, headed by Premier Simon Chang. Most popular in the past eight years of Kuomintang governance, it was the first ministry led by an independent premier since 1928, and the last under President Ma Ying-jeou after the ruling party was defeated in the presidential election.

== History ==
On 16 January 2016, Mao Chi-kuo resigned as premier following the ruling Kuomintang's defeat in both presidential and legislative election. Simon Chang, then vice premier, became the acting premier. President Ma Ying-jeou dismissed the Mao cabinet on 25 January, and appointed Chang as the successor on 1 February.

According to pollsters, the Chang cabinet had the highest approval rate amongst ministries during Ma's tenure, even surpassing the presidency's popularity. The administration won appreciation over the handling of the aftermath of the 2016 southern Taiwan earthquake, which happened just five days after the cabinet assumed office.

The cabinet resigned on 12 May amidst the upcoming transfer of power, and was succeeded by the Lin cabinet after Tsai Ing-wen of the opposition inaugurated as the president.

== Cabinet ==
Portfolio	Minister	Took office	Left office	Party
Premier	Simon Chang	1 February 2016	20 May 2016	Independent
Vice Premier	Woody Duh	1 February 2016	20 May 2016	Independent
Secretary-General of the Executive Yuan	Chien Tai-lang	24 January 2015	20 May 2016	Kuomintang
Minister of Interior	Chen Wei-zen	1 February 2016	20 May 2016	Kuomintang
Minister of Foreign Affairs	David Lin	1 February 2016	20 May 2016	Independent
Minister of National Defense	Kao Kuang-chi	31 January 2015	20 May 2016	Kuomintang
Minister of Finance	Chang Sheng-ford	4 June 2012	20 May 2016	Kuomintang
Minister of Education	Wu Se-hwa	6 August 2014	20 May 2016	Independent
Minister of Justice	Luo Ying-shay	30 September 2013	20 May 2016	Kuomintang
Minister of Economic Affairs	John Deng	8 December 2014	20 May 2016	Independent
Minister of Transportation and Communications	Chen Jian-yu	24 January 2015	20 May 2016	Independent
Minister of Culture	Hung Meng-chi	24 January 2015	20 May 2016	Independent
Minister of Health and Welfare	Chiang Been-huang	22 October 2014	20 May 2016	Independent
Minister of Labor	Chen Hsiung-wen	22 October 2014	20 May 2016	Kuomintang
Minister of Science and Technology	Shyu Jyuo-min	24 January 2015	20 May 2016	Independent
Minister of the Mongolian and Tibetan Affairs Commission	Jaclyn Tsai	24 January 2015	20 May 2016	Independent
Minister of Overseas Community Affairs Council	Chen Shyh-kwei	1 August 2013	20 May 2016	Kuomintang
Minister of the Veterans Affairs Council	Tung Hsiang-lung	1 November 2013	20 May 2016	Independent
Minister of Council of Indigenous Peoples	Lin Chiang-yi	1 August 2013	20 May 2016	Kuomintang
Minister of Hakka Affairs Council	Chung Wan-mei	1 February 2016	20 May 2016	Independent
Minister of Financial Supervisory Commission	Wang Li-ling	1 February 2016	20 May 2016	Independent
Minister of National Development Council	Lin Chu-chia	1 February 2016	20 May 2016	Independent
Minister of Mainland Affairs Council	Andrew Hsia	15 February 2015	20 May 2016	Independent
Minister of Council of Agriculture	Chen Chih-ching	1 February 2016	20 May 2016	Kuomintang
Minister of Environmental Protection Administration	Wei Kuo-yen	1 February 2016	20 May 2016	Kuomintang
Minister of Coast Guard Administration	Wang Chung-yi	1 February 2016	20 May 2016	Independent

Ministers of independent agency unaffected by the resignation of cabinets:

- Chairperson of Fair Trade Commission: Wu Shiow-ming
- Chairperson of Central Election Commission: Liu I-chou
- Chairperson of National Communications Commission: Howard S.H. Shyr
- Governor of Central Bank: Perng Fai-nan (Kuomintang)
- Minister of Atomic Energy Council, Executive Yuan: Chou Yuan-chin
- Minister of Public Construction Commission, Executive Yuan: Hsu Chun-yat
- Minister of Directorate General of Budget, Accounting and Statistics: Shih Su-mei (Kuomintang)
- Minister of Directorate-General of Personnel Administration: Huang Fu-yuan
- Director of National Palace Museum: Feng Ming-chu
- Minister without Portfolio: Feng Yen, Hsiao Chia-chi (Kuomintang), Chung Chia-te

== Opinion polls ==
Period	Conducted by	Approve	Disapprove
Early May	TISR	48.5%	18.3%
Late April	TISR	45.5%	20.2%
Early April	TISR	47.8%	17.0%
Late March	TISR	46.9%	20.6%
Early March	TISR	49.8%	15.5%
Late February	TISR	44.5%	16.2%
