= Roy Leu =

Taiwanese lawyer

Roy Leu Lü Yuan-Rong
- 呂元榮

Vice Minister of Overseas Community Affairs Council of the Republic of China
- Minister: Wu Ying-yih; Chen Shyh-kwei; Wu Hsin-hsing; Tung Chen-yuan
- Deputy: Chen Yu-mei; Hsin Shih-chang; Kao Chien-chih; Hsu Chia-ching

Personal details
- Education: National Taiwan University (LLB)

Roy Leu (traditional Chinese: 呂元榮; simplified Chinese: 吕元荣; pinyin: Lǚ Yuánróng) is a Taiwanese lawyer. He currently serves as the Vice Minister of the Overseas Community Affairs Council of the Executive Yuan.

== Education ==
Leu earned his bachelor's degree from the Department of Law of National Taiwan University.

== Overseas Community Affairs Council Vice Ministry ==
=== 2014 United States visit ===
In August 2014, Leu visited Chicago, Illinois (USA) to attend the 37th annual convention of Taiwan Benevolent Association of America (TBAA) and overseas Chinese group. Upon his arrival at the city on 14 August 2014, Leu visited Sun Yat-sen Memorial Park to pay his respect and lay flowers at the bronze statue of Sun. He then visited the Chinese Consolidated Benevolent Association of Chicago and heard a presentation about its operations. In the evening, Vice Minister Leu and ROC Representative to the United States Shen Lyu-shun was welcomed in a banquet hosted by TBAA, which was also attended by more than 100 representatives from dozens of overseas Chinese groups in Chicago.

On 15 August 2014, Leu, Shen and other government officials attended the founding assembly for the Committee for the Promotion of Support in North America for Taiwan's entry into Regional Economic Organizations, which aimed to bring together power of the overseas Chinese community to exert influence to help Taiwan join regional economic organizations.

On 16 August 2014, the 37th TBAA annual convention was held, which was attended by Leu and also by Lieutenant Governor of Illinois Sheila Simon. Two homeland situation symposiums were arranged, "The Domestic Political Situation" and "International Trends and Chinese Language Education Trends in the US".

== Personal life ==
Leu is fluent in Cantonese.
