= Mao Chi-kuo cabinet =

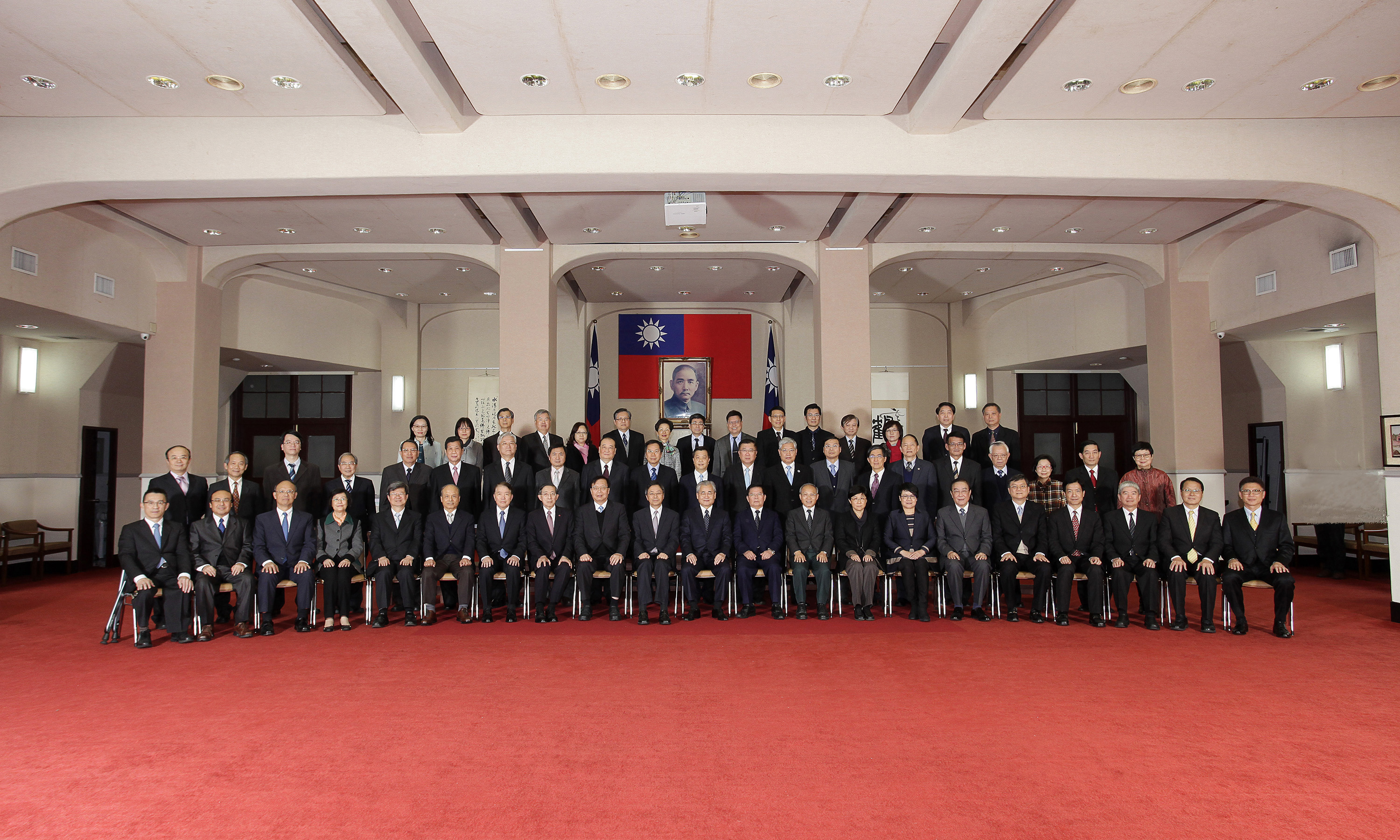
- Date formed: 8 December 2014
- Date dissolved: 1 February 2016

People and organisations
- Head of state: Ma Ying-jeou
- Head of government: Mao Chi-kuo
- Deputy head of government: Simon Chang
- Member parties: Kuomintang
- Status in legislature: Majority (64 / 113; 57%)
- Opposition party: Democratic Progressive Party
- Opposition leader: Tsai Ing-wen

History
- Predecessor: Jiang Yi-huah cabinet
- Successor: Simon Chang cabinet

Mao Chi-kuo cabinet (Chinese: 毛治國內閣; pinyin: Máo Zhìguó nèigé) was the cabinet of the Republic of China (Taiwan) led by Premier Mao Chi-kuo from 8 December 2014 to 1 February 2016. It was the fifth cabinet during the presidency of Ma Ying-jeou.

Following the 2016 presidential and legislative elections on 16 January 2016, Premier Mao announced his resignation, citing the need for political accountability and a smooth transition of power. He congratulated the winning candidates and thanked election staff for their work. Mao declined President Ma Ying-jeou’s attempt to retain him, stressing that the Executive Yuan should remain effective during the four-month transition period before the new administration took office.
