= Chang Fu-mei =

Taiwanese lawyer and politician

- 張富美
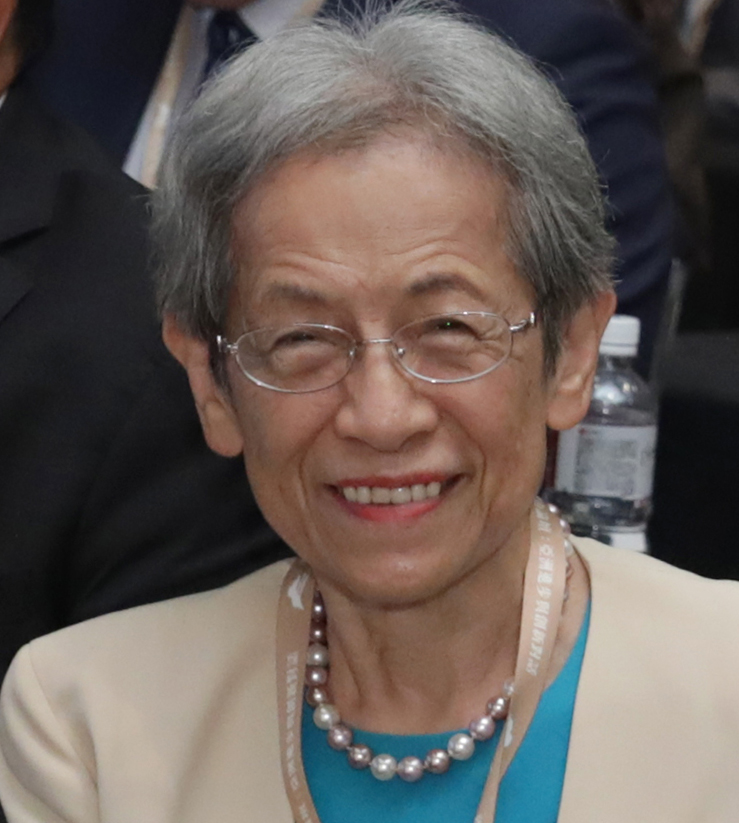
- Chang Fu-mei at the 2019 Yushan Forum

Minister of Overseas Compatriot Affairs Commission of the Republic of China
- In office April 2006 – 20 May 2008
- Preceded by: Position established
- Succeeded by: Wu Ying-yih

Minister of Overseas Chinese Affairs Commission of the Republic of China
- In office 20 May 2000 – April 2006
- Deputy: Wu Hsin-hsing
- Preceded by: Chiao Jen-ho
- Succeeded by: Position abolished

Personal details
- Born: 10 October 1938 (age 88) Yunlin County, Taiwan
- Education: National Taiwan University (LLB); Northwestern University (LLM); Harvard University (PhD)

Chang Fu-mei (Chinese: 張富美; pinyin: Zhāng Fùměi, born 10 October 1938) is a Taiwanese lawyer, historian, and politician. She served as the Minister of the Overseas Chinese Affairs Commission, subsequently Overseas Compatriot Affairs Commission of the Executive Yuan in 2000–2008.

== Education ==
Chang attended law school at National Taiwan University and graduated with a Bachelor of Laws (LL.B.) degree. She then completed graduate studies in the United States, earning a Master of Laws (LL.M.) at Northwestern University in 1962 from the Pritzker School of Law. In 1970, she earned her Ph.D. in history from Harvard University. Her doctoral dissertation was titled, "Private code commentaries in the development of Ch'ing law, 1644-1911".

Chang moved to the United States after witnessing her close friends being defamed and incarcerated after the Kaohsiung Incident. She searched all of the possible avenues in the US government and a slew of academic institutions.

== Early political life ==
She took up a role in the National Assembly, became executive director of the Commission for Examining Petitions and Appeal of the Taipei City Government and became the watchdog member of Control Yuan.

== Overseas Chinese Affairs Commission Minister ==
=== United States visit ===
Chang, as the Minister of Overseas Chinese Affairs Commission, visited United States in 16–17 April 2003 where she was accompanied by Director-General of Taipei Economic and Cultural Office in Chicago. They met with the members of TAAMN, University of Minnesota Taiwan Student Association (TSA) and other Taiwan-related organizations hosted by TAAMN and TSA. The next day, they met with Governor of Minnesota Tim Pawlenty and other officials.
