= Fan Yang-shang =

Taiwanese politician (born 1937)

Fan Yang-shang (Chinese: 范揚盛; born 21 October 1937) is a Taiwanese politician.

Fan attended the Taipei campus of National Chung Hsing University, where he earned a bachelor's degree in sociology. He pursued graduate study in the same subject at Waseda University. Fan worked as a consultant for the World Hakka Federation and was also the director of the Greater New York Hakka Association. In his return to Taiwan, Fan was successively appointed to the Overseas Chinese Affairs Commission, elected to the second National Assembly, and served on the Legislative Yuan from 1999 to 2002. While a member of the Legislative Yuan, Fan represented Overseas Chinese on behalf of the Kuomintang, and served as convenor of the Foreign Affairs Committee.
