= Chen Yu-mei =

Taiwanese politician (1966–2017)

- 陳玉梅
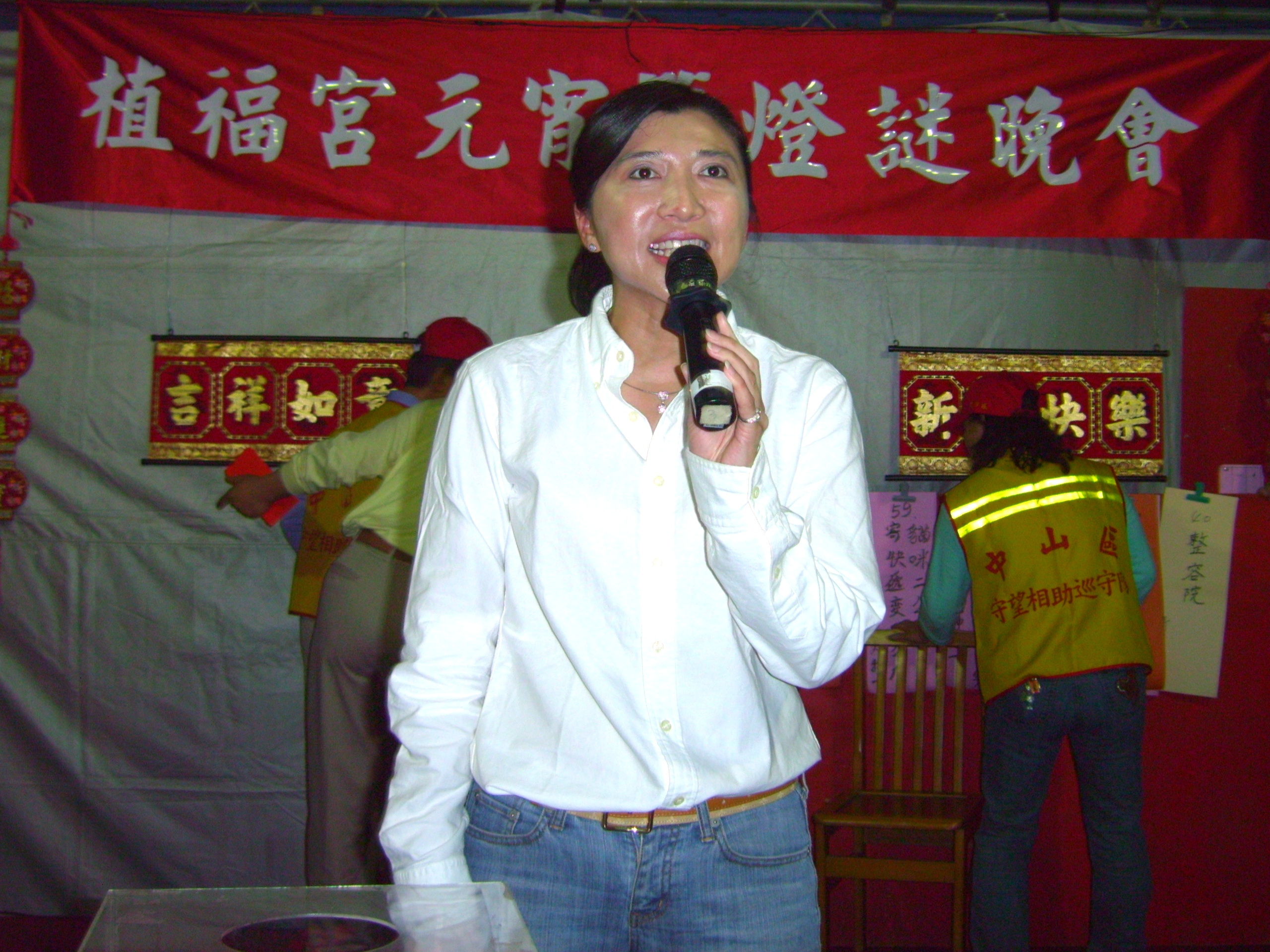

Deputy Minister of the Overseas Community Affairs Council
- In office 18 September 2013 – 8 August 2014
- Minister: Chen Shyh-kwei
- Vice: Roy Leu
- Preceded by: Jen Hong
- Succeeded by: Hsin Shih-chang

Personal details
- Born: 22 July 1966 Taipei, Taiwan
- Died: 22 January 2017 (aged 50) Taipei, Taiwan
- Party: Kuomintang
- Education: Aoyama Gakuin University (BBA); National Taiwan University (MBA)

Chen Yu-mei (Chinese: 陳玉梅; pinyin: Chén Yùméi; 22 July 1966 – 22 January 2017) was a Taiwanese politician. She served as Deputy Minister of the Overseas Community Affairs Council of the Executive Yuan from 18 September 2013 to 8 August 2014.

== Education and early career ==
Chen obtained her bachelor's degree in business administration from Aoyama Gakuin University in Japan and her Executive MBA from National Taiwan University. She worked in the media as a TV and radio host and spokesperson.

== Political career ==
She was a member of Taipei City Council for five consecutive terms from 25 December 1994 until 25 December 2010. During her term on the city council, she worked with non-profit organizations and exchange programs with sister cities abroad, gaining familiarity with overseas community affairs.

=== Overseas Community Affairs Council Deputy Ministry ===
==== Appointment ====
On 18 September 2013, the Executive Yuan appointed Chen as the Deputy Minister of the Overseas Community Affairs Council, after the reorganization of the council to have only two deputy ministers. Chen's mandate was to guide overseas community affairs regarding business, students, news and overseas Chinese media, and to assist the OCAC in cooperating with the government to help develop emerging markets, construct a global network for overseas youth, and cultivate and retain talent.

==== Resignation ====
On 8 August 2014, Chen officially resigned to attend to other career plans. A tea party was held that day to see off the departing Deputy Minister Chen, which was attended by Minister Chen Shyh-kwei, Deputy Minister Roy Leu, all OCAC staff as well as her mother. Minister Chen granted her a Grade 1 Huaguang Professional Medal and volunteer's hat and vest, hoping that she would always be an overseas Chinese affairs volunteer.

Chen expressed her gratitude for having served at the council and thanked her staff for their assistance and support over the previous 10 months of her deputy ministerial term. She was succeeded by Hsin Shih-chang, a professor from National Taiwan Normal University.
