= Hsin Shih-chang =

Academician and politician of Taiwan

- 信世昌

Deputy Minister of the Overseas Community Affairs Council of the Republic of China
- Incumbent
- Assumed office 8 August 2014
- Minister: Chen Shyh-kwei
- Vice: Roy Leu
- Preceded by: Chen Yu-mei

Personal details
- Education: National Taiwan Normal University (BA); Indiana University Bloomington (MS, PhD)

Hsin Shih-chang (Chinese: 信世昌; pinyin: Xìn Shìchāng) is a Taiwanese academic. He was the Deputy Minister of the Overseas Community Affairs Council of the Executive Yuan, having served since 18 August 2014 to 19 May 2016.

== Early life and education ==
Hsin graduated from National Taiwan Normal University with a bachelor's degree in Chinese language and literature, then completed graduate studies in the United States at Indiana University Bloomington, where he earned a Master of Science (M.S.) and his Ph.D. in instructional systems design and educational technology from the Indiana University School of Education in 1994. His doctoral dissertation, completed under professor Theodore W. Frick, was titled, "Implementing computers in schools: Two case studies in Taiwan".

== Early career ==
In 1994-1995, he was the Associate Professor of the Department of Visual Communications at Shih Hsin University. He then moved to the Graduate Institute of Teaching Chinese as a Second Language of National Taiwan Normal University to become Associate Professor in 1995-2001, Full Professor in 2001 to present, and Chair in 2001-2007. In 2010-2011, he was the Deputy Dean of the International Affairs Division.

He was also the President of Association of Teaching Chinese as a Second Language. In 2004-2005, he was the Visiting Scholar of the Department of East Asian Languages and Civilizations of Harvard University in the United States and in 2008-2009 as a Visiting Professor of the Free University of Berlin in Germany.

== Political career ==
Hsin had worked with the OCAC on the promotion of overseas Chinese education for over 20 years and thus invited to be the Deputy Minister for OCAC, in charge of educational and cultural affairs, in terms of overseas Chinese language education, overseas Chinese students recruitment strategies and overseas Chinese media collaborations.
