= List of ambassadors of Haiti to Taiwan =

Coordinates: 25.117191°N 121.524123°E

Ambassador of Haiti to Taiwan
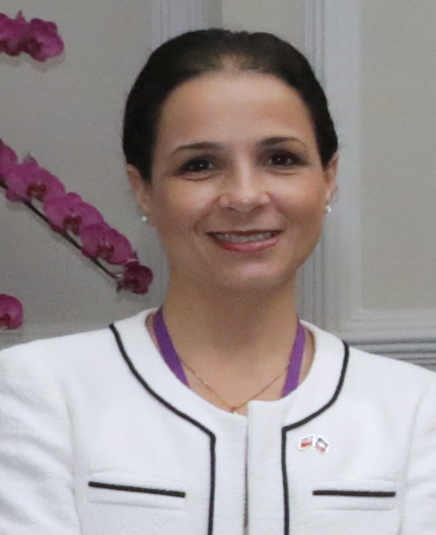
- Incumbent; Rachel Coupaud since October 11, 2015
- Inaugural holder: Carlo Boulos
- Formation: April 8, 1980

The Haitian ambassador in Taipei is the official representative of the Government in Port-au-Prince to the Government of Taiwan.

== List of representatives ==
Diplomatic agrément/Diplomatic accreditation	ambassador	Chinese language	Observations	List of heads of state of Haiti	List of premiers of the Republic of China	Term end
1956			ROC established diplomatic ties with Haiti	Paul Eugène Magloire	Yu Hung-Chun	
April 8, 1980	Carlo Boulos Jean-Claude Bordes		with residence in Tokyo (Japan)	Jean-Claude Duvalier	Sun Yun-suan	
August 16, 1981			Chargé d'affaires	Jean-Claude Duvalier	Sun Yun-suan	
May 8, 1983	Paul Raymond Perodin	白若丹	May 8, 1983 married May 1 to Miss Mane-Carmel Berrouet	Jean-Claude Duvalier	Sun Yun-suan	July 26, 1990
September 1991	Sonny Seraphin	塞拉凡		Jean-Bertrand Aristide	Hau Pei-tsun	1999
March 2002	Lafontaine Saint Louis	盛祿誼		Jean-Bertrand Aristide	Yu Shyi-kun	April 1, 2004
August 2005	Paul Raymond Perodin	白若丹		Boniface Alexandre	Frank Hsieh	
October 11, 2015	Rachel Coupaud	庫珀	*From February 2012 till October 4, 2015 she was Chargé d'affaires.	Michel Martelly	Mao Chi-kuo	2020
