= Jen Hong =

Taiwanese politician

- 任弘

Deputy Minister of Overseas Chinese Affairs Council of the Republic of China
- Minister: Wu Ying-yih
- Succeeded by: Chen Yu-mei

Personal details
- Education: Tamkang University; National Taiwan Normal University

Jen Hong (Chinese: 任弘; pinyin: Rén Hóng) is a Taiwanese politician. He was the Deputy Minister of the Overseas Chinese Affairs Council of the Executive Yuan.
