= Lin Hsi-yao =

Taiwanese politician

- 林錫耀
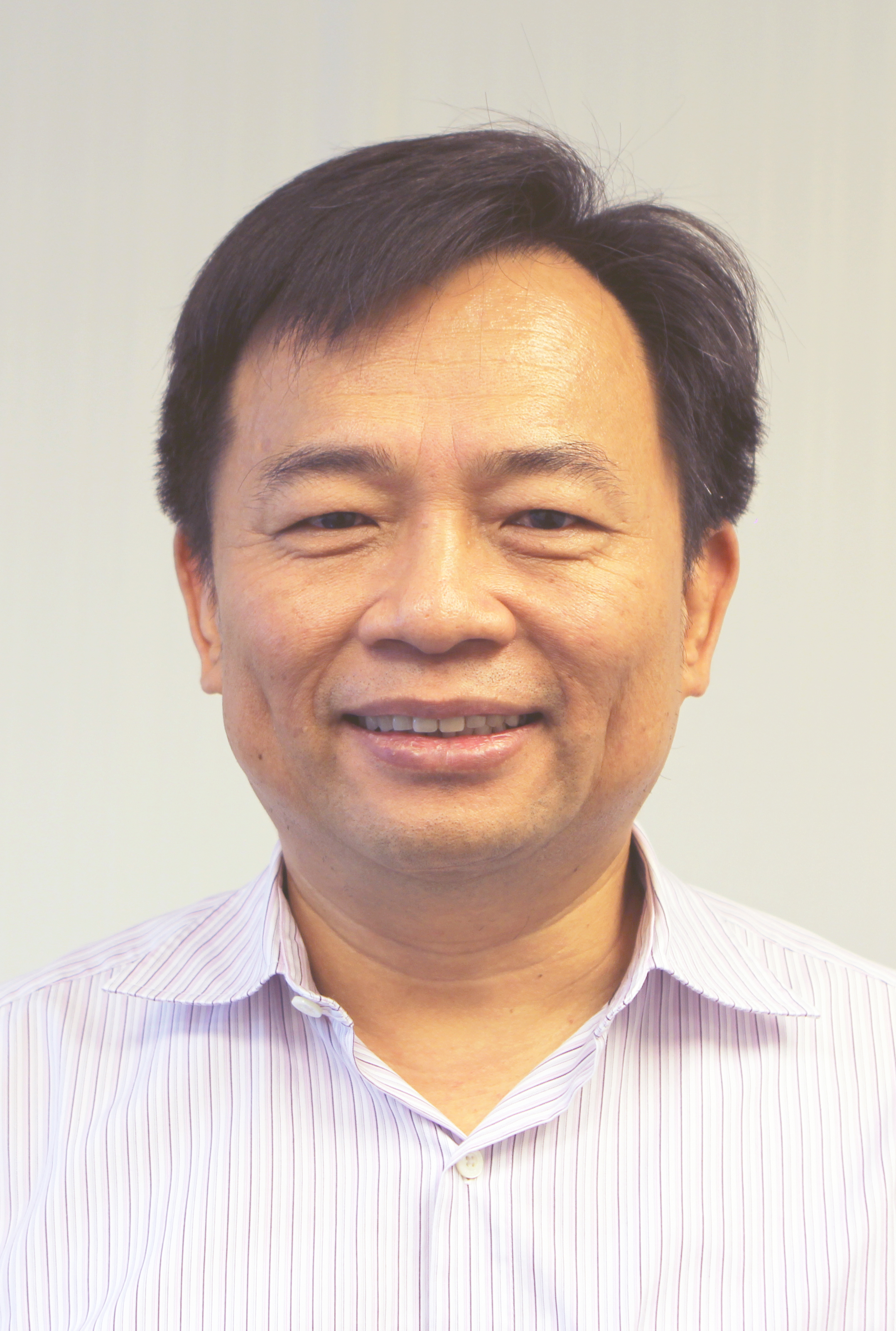
- Official portrait, 2012

35th Vice Premier of the Republic of China
- In office 20 May 2016 – 7 September 2017
- Prime Minister: Lin Chuan
- Preceded by: Woody Duh
- Succeeded by: Shih Jun-ji

19th and 23rd Secretary-General of the Democratic Progressive Party
- In office 20 May 2020 – 26 Nov 2022
- Chairwoman: Tsai Ing-wen
- Preceded by: Luo Wen-jia
- Succeeded by: Sidney Lin (acting)
- In office 5 June 2012 – 28 May 2014
- Chairman: Su Tseng-chang
- Preceded by: Su Chia-chyuan
- Succeeded by: Joseph Wu

Minister without Portfolio
- In office 21 December 2007 – 20 May 2008
- Premier: Chang Chun-hsiung

19th Chairman of the Provincial Government (Note: Titled as chairman of the Taiwan Provincial Government; as a governor that was appointed by the Executive Yuan.)
- In office 7 December 2007 – 19 May 2008
- Appointed by: Executive Yuan
- Prime Minister: Su Tseng-chang; Chang Chun-hsiung
- Preceded by: Lin Kuang-hua; Jeng Peir-fuh (acting)
- Succeeded by: Tsai Hsun-hsiung

Acting Magistrate of Taipei County
- In office 20 May 2004 – 20 December 2005
- Preceded by: Su Tseng-chang
- Succeeded by: Chou Hsi-wei

Deputy Magistrate of Taipei County
- In office 1 March 1999 – 20 May 2004
- Magistrate: Su Tseng-chang

Director of the Department of Environmental Protection
- In office 1 December 1990 – 1992
- Magistrate: Yu Shyi-kun

Personal details
- Born: 25 December 1961 (age 64) Yilan County, Taiwan
- Party: Democratic Progressive Party
- Spouse: Huang Hui-jiao
- Education: National Taiwan University (BS, MS)

Lin Hsi-yao (Chinese: 林錫耀; pinyin: Lín Xíyào; Pe̍h-ōe-jī: Lîm Sek-iāu; born 25 December 1961) is a Taiwanese politician. He was the first Vice Premier of Taiwan under the Tsai Ing-wen government and the Lin cabinet. He served as the secretary-general of the Democratic Progressive Party from 2012 to 2014 and 2020 to 2022, he resigned the office with the incumbent chairwoman Tsai Ing-wen after the party's poor performance in the local elections in 2022. He had also served as the Acting Magistrate of Taipei County, Deputy Magistrate of Taipei County, and Minister without Portfolio of the Executive Yuan.

== Education ==
Lin graduated from National Taiwan University with a bachelor's degree in civil engineering in 1983 and a master's degree in civil engineering in 1990.

== Vice Premiership ==
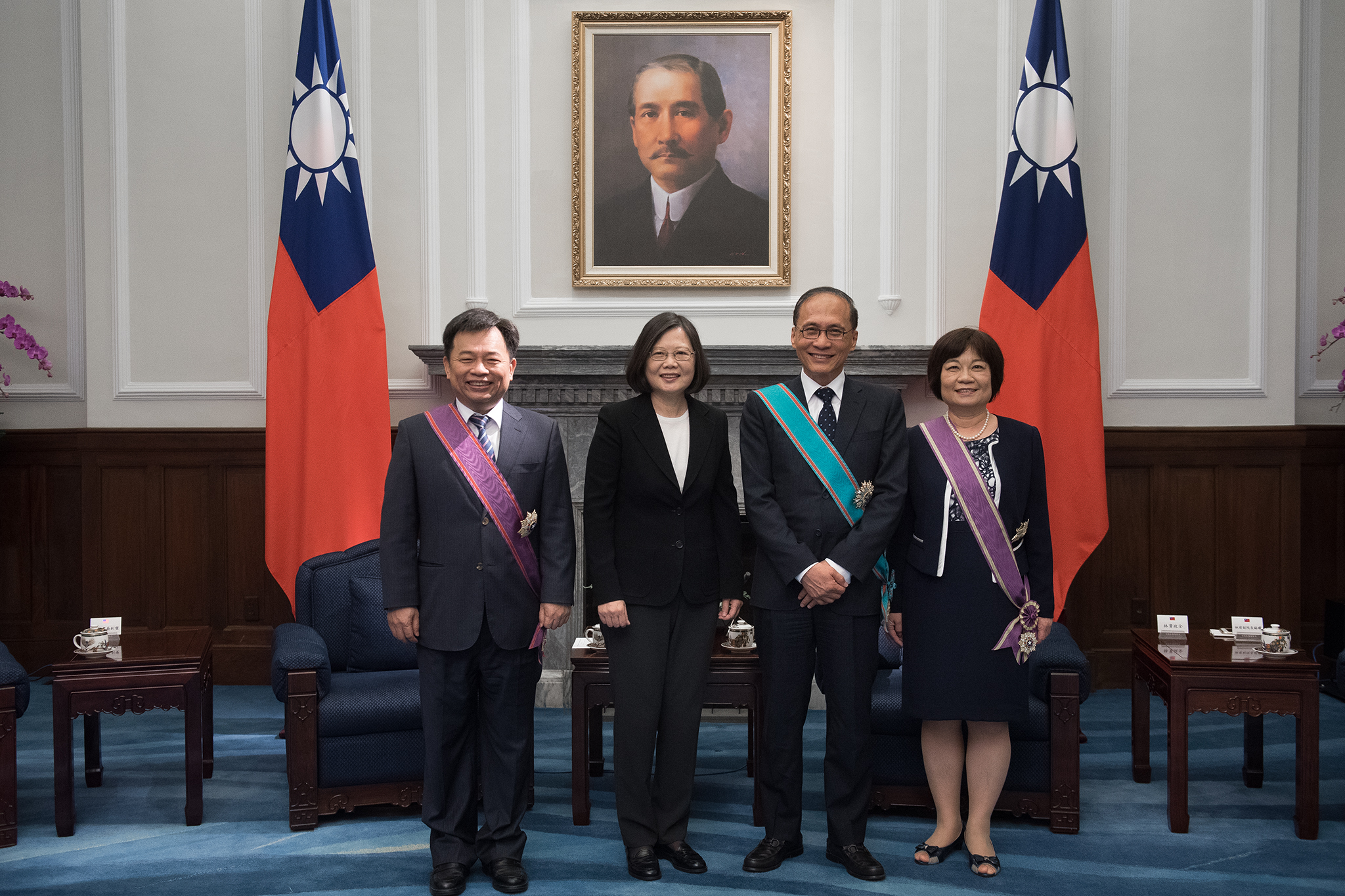
Lin Hsi-yao and the members of Lin cabinet was presented with an Order of Brilliant Star from the president Tsai Ing-wen in September 2017.

On 7 April 2016, Premier-designate Lin Chuan appointed Lin Hsi-yao to the position of vice premier. Lin Hsi-yao resigned in September 2017, and was shortly afterward presented with an Order of Brilliant Star.

== Later political career ==
Lin later worked on Tsai Ing-wen's 2020 presidential campaign. She won a second term, after which Lin was named secretary-general of the Democratic Progressive Party.

== Notes ==
Party political offices
Preceded by Luo Wen-jia	Secretary-General of the Democratic Progressive Party; 2020–	Incumbent
