= Lin cabinet =

- 48th premiership of Taiwan

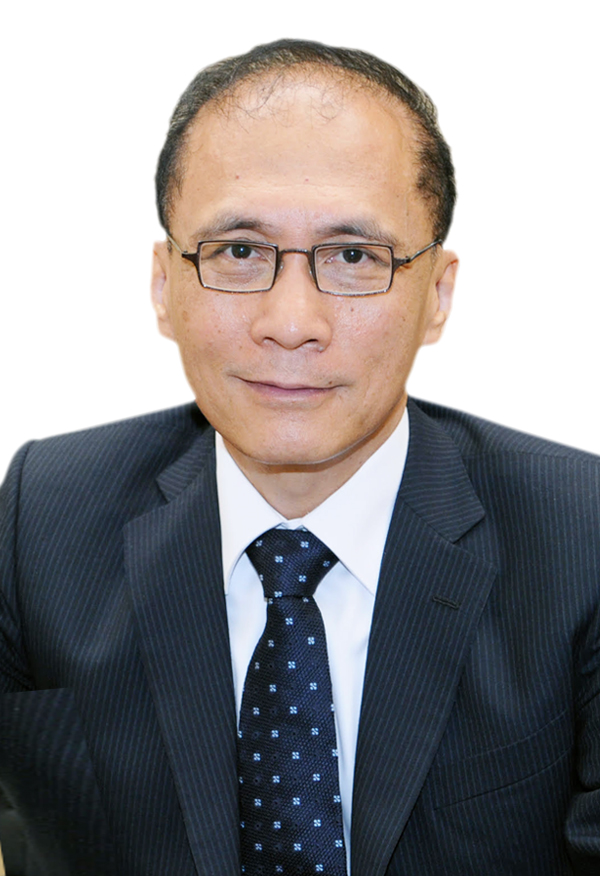
- Date formed: 20 May 2016
- Date dissolved: 3 September 2017

People and organisations
- Head of state: Tsai Ing-wen
- Head of government: Lin Chuan
- Deputy head of government: Lin Hsi-yao
- Total no. of members: ?
- Member parties: Democratic Progressive Party (DPP)
- Status in legislature: DPP majority, pan-green majority
- Opposition parties: Kuomintang
- Opposition leader: Johnny Chiang

History
- Election: 2016 Taiwanese legislative election
- Legislature term: Ninth Legislative Yuan
- Predecessor: Simon Chang cabinet
- Successor: Lai cabinet

On 15 March 2016, president-elect of the Republic of China Tsai Ing-wen named Lin Chuan premier. He was confirmed by the Legislative Yuan soon after and took office on 20 May 2016.

On 3 September 2017, Premier Lin Chuan tendered his resignation to President Tsai Ing-wen, which was reluctantly accepted. A recent poll showed Lin's approve rating to be a mere 28.7%, with 6 in 10 respondents dissatisfied with the performance of his cabinet.

== Members of the Executive Yuan ==
=== Ministers ===
- Lin Hsi-yao, Vice Premier
- Yeh Jiunn-rong, Interior
- David Lee, Foreign Affairs
- Feng Shih-kuan, National Defense
- Sheu Yu-jer, Finance
- Pan Wen-chung, Education
- Chiu Tai-san, Justice
- Lee Chih-kung, Economic Affairs
- Hochen Tan, Transportation and Communications
- Lin Tzou-yien, Health and Welfare
- Cheng Li-chun, Culture
- Kuo Fang-yu, Labor
- Yang Hung-duen, Science and Technology

=== Ministers without portfolio ===
In the Lin cabinet, the following held office as ministers without portfolio:

- Audrey Tang
- Chang Ching-sen, also serving as Governor of Fujian Province
- Chen Tain-jy, also serving as Minister of National Development Council
- Hsu Jan-yau, also serving as Governor of Taiwan Province and Minister of Mongolian and Tibetan Affairs Commission
- John Deng
- Lin Wan-i
- Wu Hong-mo, also serving as Minister of Public Construction Commission
- Wu Tsung-tsong

=== Staff ===
- Chen Mei-ling, Secretary-General
- Ho Pei-shan and Sung Yu-hsieh, Deputy Secretaries-General
