= Joyce Feng =

Taiwanese politician

Joyce Feng Feng Yan
- 馮燕

Minister without Portfolio of the Executive Yuan
- In office 1 August 2013 – 19 May 2016
- Preceded by: Chen Shyh-kwei

Personal details
- Education: National Taiwan University; University of Illinois at Urbana-Champaign

Joyce Feng (Chinese: 馮燕; pinyin: Féng Yàn) is a Taiwanese politician. She was a Minister without Portfolio of the Executive Yuan (1 August 2013 - 19 May 2016), supervising social welfare operations.

== Taiwan Girls' Day inauguration ==
Speaking at the inauguration ceremony of Taiwan Girls' Day in Taipei on 11 October 2013, Feng said that the development underscored the commitment of the ROC government to creating a friendly environment for girls and pursuing gender equality, which is in line with the International Day of the Girl Child adopted by the United Nations in 2011.
