= Wu Hsin-hsing =

Taiwanese political scientist

- 吳新興
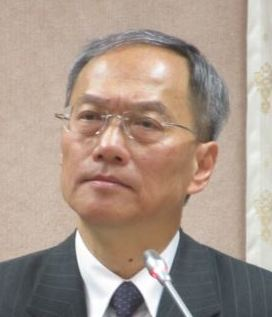
- Wu Hsin-hsing answering interpellation at the Foreign and National Defense Committee, Legislative Yuan.

Minister of Overseas Community Affairs Council of the Republic of China
- In office 20 May 2016 – 19 May 2020
- Deputy: Tien Chiu-chin; Kao Chien-chih
- Vice: Roy Leu
- Preceded by: Chen Shyh-kwei
- Succeeded by: Tung Chen-yuan

ROC Representative to the Philippines
- In office 2003–2008

Deputy Minister of Overseas Chinese Affairs Commission of the Republic of China
- In office 2000–2003
- Minister: Chang Fu-mei

Personal details
- Education: Soochow University (BA); New Mexico State University (MA); University of Melbourne (PhD)

Wu Hsin-hsing (Chinese: 吳新興; pinyin: Wú Xīnxīng) is a Taiwanese political scientist who served as Minister of the Overseas Community Affairs Council, Republic of China (ROC) from 20 May 2016 until 19 May 2020.

== Education ==
Wu obtained his bachelor's degree in English literature from Soochow University in 1982, master's degree in international relations from New Mexico State University in the United States in 1984 and doctoral degree in political science from the University of Melbourne in Australia in 1989.

== See also ==
- Overseas Chinese
