= Paul Chiu =

Taiwanese economist and politician (1942–2025)

Chiu Cheng-hsiung
- 邱正雄
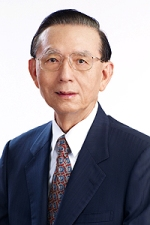
- Official portrait, 2008

28th Vice Premier of the Republic of China
- In office 20 May 2008 – 10 September 2009
- Prime Minister: Liu Chao-shiuan
- Preceded by: Chang Chun-hsiung (acting)
- Succeeded by: Eric Chu

21st Minister of Finance
- In office 10 June 1996 – 20 May 2000
- Prime Minister: Lien Chan; Vincent Siew
- Deputy: Yen Ching-chang
- Preceded by: Lin Chen-kuo
- Succeeded by: Shea Jia-dong

Personal details
- Born: 19 February 1942 Karenkō Prefecture, Taiwan, Empire of Japan
- Died: 22 July 2025 (aged 83)
- Party: Kuomintang
- Education: National Taiwan University (BA); Ohio State University (MA, PhD)

Chiu Cheng-hsiung (Chinese: 邱正雄; pinyin: Qiū Zhèngxióng; 19 February 1942 – 22 July 2025), also known by his English name Paul Chiu, was a Taiwanese economist and politician. He was the first appointed vice premier of the Executive Yuan in the presidency of Ma Ying-jeou. Before his vice premiership, he was the minister of Finance, during the previous government of the Kuomintang, from 1996 to 2000.

== Early life and education ==
Chiu was born in Hualien County (then part of Karenkō Prefecture) on 19 February 1942 during the Japanese rule of Taiwan. His family soon relocated to Yilan County but moved back to Hualien in 1956. After graduating with honors from National Hualien Senior High School, Chiu studied economics at National Taiwan University and graduated with his bachelor's degree in 1964. He then completed graduate studies in the United States at Ohio State University (OSU), where he won a scholarship provided by the Fulbright Program. As a graduate student at OSU, Chiu worked as a teaching assistant in the economics department from 1968 to 1973.

In 1973, Chiu obtained a Master of Arts (M.A.) in economics from Ohio State University and, while enrolled in the university's doctoral program, became an associate professor at National Taiwan University. From 1975 to 1976, he also worked as an assistant general manager at the Central Bank of the Republic of China. He earned his Ph.D. in the economics from OSU in 1978 with a specialization in monetary theory, banking, and finance. His doctoral dissertation was titled, "A Two-Stage Decision Rule for the Conduct of Monetary Policy," and was completed under economics professor William G. Dewald.

== Political career ==
=== Central Bank of the Republic of China (Taiwan) ===
Chiu began working at the Central Bank of the Republic of China (Taiwan) in the 1970s. During his tenure as deputy leader of the bank's Department of Foreign Exchange from 1976 to 1981, the New Taiwan dollar became a floating currency. Chiu was later promoted as a deputy governor of the CBC, leaving that position to accept an appointment to the finance ministry.

=== Finance ministership ===
Chiu first entered the Executive Yuan as minister of Finance in June 1996 during the premiership of Lien Chan. He retained his position as Vincent Siew became premier in August 1997. Chiu was replaced following the 2000 Taiwanese presidential election, when Chen Shui-bian of the Democratic Progressive Party succeeded Lee Teng-hui as president.

=== Vice premiership ===
Followed by the party alternation again in 2008 with the KMT returned to govern, he was appointed the vice premier in the Liu Chao-shiuan cabinet.

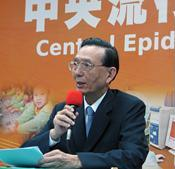
Chiu in 2009, during vice premiership.

Chiu and Premier Liu Chao-shiuan resigned on 10 September 2009 due to the slow disaster response by the government to Typhoon Morakot which struck Taiwan in August 2009. He was replaced by the then-incumbent magistrate of Taoyuan, Eric Chu.

== Later life and death ==
After leaving politics, Chiu successively chaired the EnTie Commercial Bank and Bank SinoPac, and also taught economics at National Taiwan University. Chiu's death at the age of 83 was announced on 22 July 2025.
