= Lee Yen-hui =

Taiwanese politician

Elaine Lee
- 李姸慧
- Official portrait, 2025

Minister of Overseas Community Affairs
- Incumbent
- Assumed office 7 October 2026
- Prime Minister: Cho Jung-tai
- Preceded by: Hsu Chia-ching

Political Deputy Minister of Overseas Community Affairs
- In office 1 September 2025 – 7 October 2026 Serving with Lai Li-ying
- Minister: Hsu Chia-ching
- Preceded by: Ruan Jhao-syong

Hsinchu City Councillor
- In office 1 March 2002 – 25 December 2022
- Constituency: North District

Personal details
- Born: 10 July 1976 (age 50) Taipei, Taiwan
- Party: DPP (since 2016)
- Spouse: Yang Sheng-hsiang
- Education: National Taiwan University

Elaine Lee Yen-hui (Chinese: 李姸慧, born 10 July 1976) is a Taiwanese politician who served as the minister of the Overseas Community Affairs Council after her predecessor, Hsu Chia-ching, stepped down in October 2026.

== Political career ==
Lee started her political career as a member of the Taiwan Solidarity Party. In 2002, she was elected to the Hsinchu City Council. At the age of 26, she was then the youngest elected councilor in Hsinchu City's history.

In 2016, she joined the Democratic Progressive Party (DPP).

In 2022, she did not seek reelection to the Hsinchu City Council, ending her 20 years of service. In the same year, she served as DPP's spokesperson until 2023.

After the Great Recall Wave ended in August 2025, she became the political Deputy Minister of the Overseas Community Affairs Council in the Cho Jung-tai reshuffled cabinet, to replace her predecessor, Ruan Jhao-syong, who was promoted to the position of Deputy Secretary-General of the Executive Yuan.

Earlier in 2026, she became a member of the Digital Economy Development Advisory Council of the Ministry of Digital Affairs.

On 7 October 2026, Minister Hsu Chia-cheng resigned amid a scandal involving the abuse of the council's resources for her family's benefit. Lee was named interim minister afterward, expected to serve until after the 2026 Taiwanese local elections.

== Personal life ==
Lee is married to Yang Sheng-hsiang, a family member of the Chang-Yih Group.
