= Hsu Chia-ching =

Taiwanese politician (born 1967)

- 徐佳青
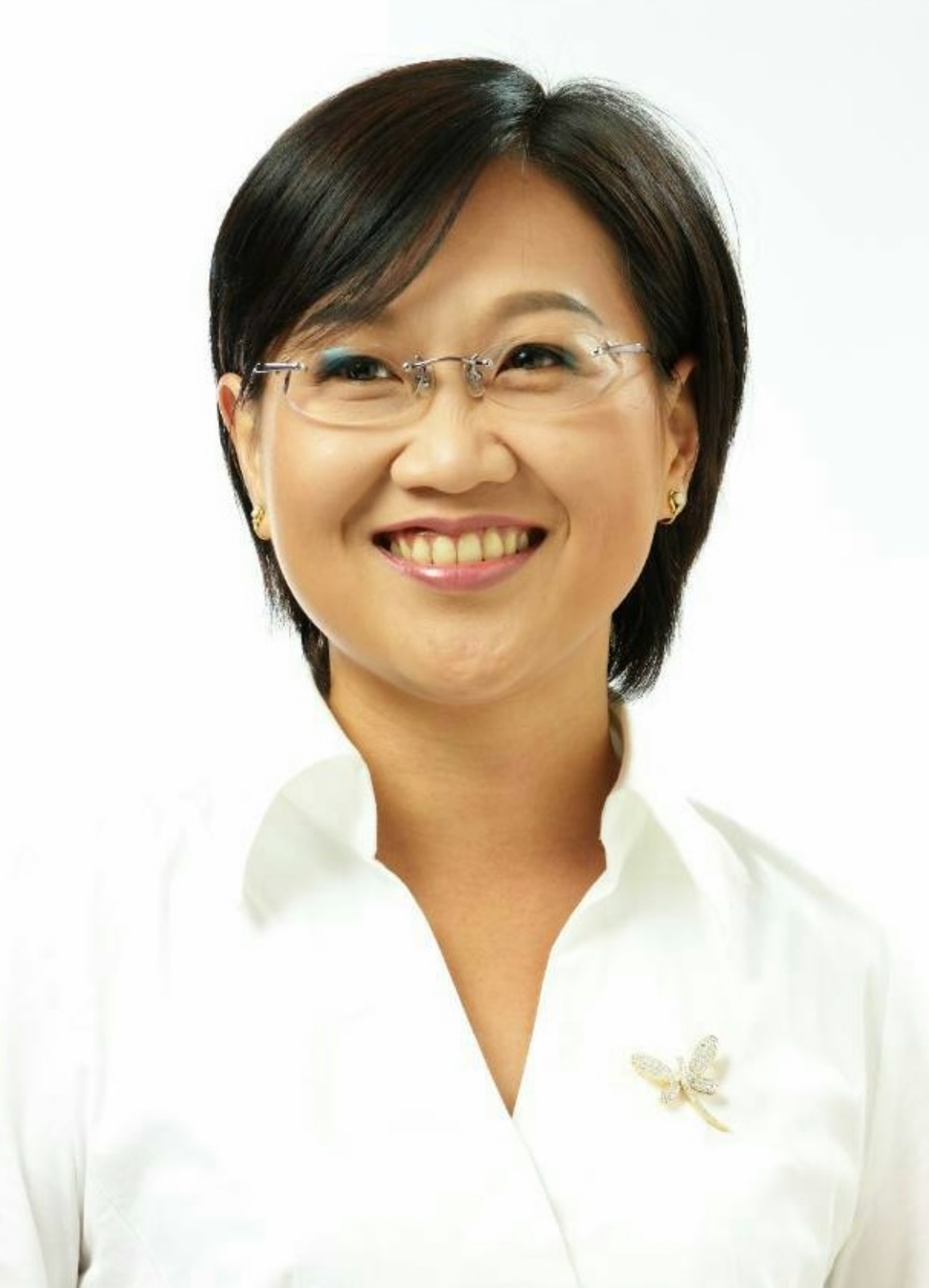
- Official portrait, 2023

19th Minister of Overseas Community Affairs
- In office 31 January 2023 – 7 October 2026
- Prime Minister: Chen Chien-jen; Cho Jung-tai
- Preceded by: Tung Chen-yuan
- Succeeded by: Lee Yen-hui

Political Deputy Minister of Overseas Community Affairs
- In office 20 May 2020 – 31 January 2023
- Minister: Tung Chen-yuan
- Preceded by: Kao Chien-chih
- Succeeded by: Ruan Jhao-syong

Acting Secretary-General of the Democratic Progressive Party
- In office 25 November 2018 – 13 January 2019
- Chairman: Lin Yu-chang
- Preceded by: Hung Yao-fu
- Succeeded by: Luo Wen-jia

21st Deputy Secretary-General of the Democratic Progressive Party
- In office 25 May 2016 – 15 July 2019
- Secretary General: Hung Yao-fu; Herself (acting); Luo Wen-jia
- Preceded by: Hung Yao-fu
- Succeeded by: Lin Fei-fan

Taipei City Councillor
- In office 25 December 2002 – 25 December 2014
- Succeeded by: Chien Shu-pei
- Constituency: Taipei VI (Da'an, Wenshan)

Personal details
- Born: 22 October 1967 (age 58) Taipei, Taiwan
- Party: Democratic Progressive Party
- Spouse: Bo Tedards
- Relatives: Hsu Kuo-yung (uncle)
- Education: National Taiwan University (BS); Philipps-University Marburg (Diplom); National Yang-Ming University (MS)

Hsu Chia-ching (Chinese: 徐佳青; Wade–Giles: Hsu^{2} Chia^{1}-ching^{1}, born 22 October 1967) is a Taiwanese politician who served as the minister of the Overseas Community Affairs Council since 2023.

== Education ==
Hsu graduated from National Taiwan University with a Bachelor of Science in agronomy. She completed graduate studies in Germany, earning a Diplom in sociology from Marburg University. She then earned a Master of Science (M.S.) in health and welfare policy from National Yang-Ming University.

== Political career ==
Hsu first joined politics because of the Peng Wan-ru murder incident. During her political career, she is the member of the Democratic Progressive Party (DPP) and served many positions within the political party; including spokesperson, Women's Affairs Department director and central committee member.

Between 2002 and 2014, she served as a councillor in the Taipei City Council. She gives up re-election in 2014 and succeeded the position to her assistant, Chien Shu-pei.

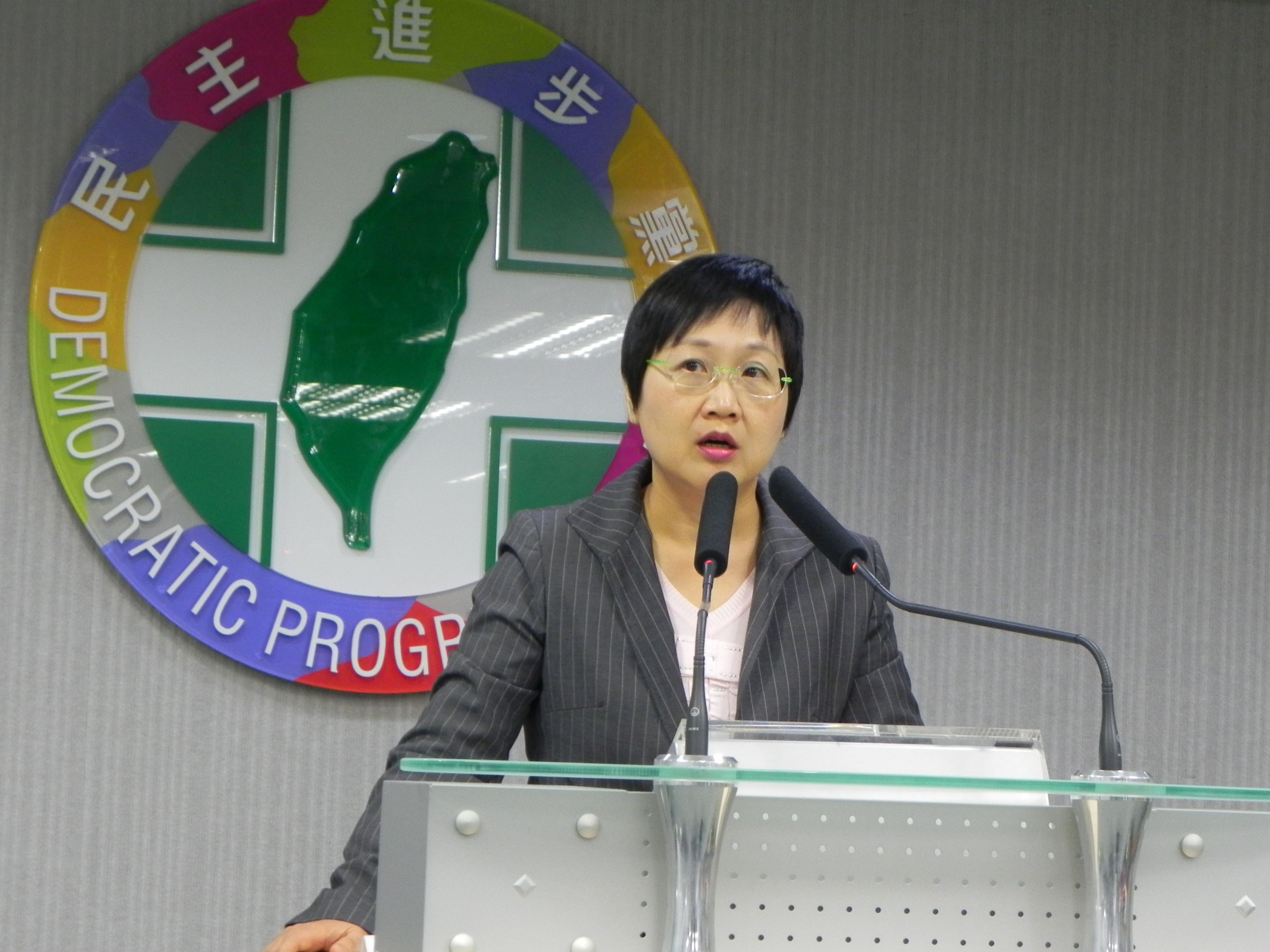
Hsu Chia-ching in 2014.

After her councilorship ended, she returned to work for the Democratic Progressive Party, serving as the deputy secretary-general from 2016 to 2019, during DPP's second ruling in Taiwan's government.

Between November 2018 to January 2019, she served as the acting secretary-general of the Democratic Progressive Party under the interim leadership of Lin Yu-chang after the resignation of both the DPP chairwoman Tsai Ing-wen and DPP secretary-general Hung Yao-fu due to the party's loss in the 2018 Taiwanese local elections.

She served as the political deputy minister of the Overseas Community Affairs Council from 2020 to 2023. In the January 2023 cabinet reshuffle, she was promoted as the minister, and continued serving as minister in the new government under DPP ruling in 2024. After legislators Vicky Chen and Hung Yu-shiang accused Hsu of misusing travel funds throughout her tenure as deputy and head of OCAC, Hsu resigned from her post.

== Personal life ==
Hsu married to Bo Tedards who is a citizen of the United States.

Her uncle is Hsu Kuo-yung, who is currently the host for the FTV News political program "National Bravest" since 2023 and former interior minister of Taiwan serving from 2018 to 2022.
