= James C. Y. Chu =

Taiwanese politician and diplomat

James C.Y. Chu
- 祝基瀅

Minister of the Overseas Chinese Affairs Commission
- In office 10 June 1996 – 5 February 1998
- Preceded by: John Chiang
- Succeeded by: Chiao Jen-ho

Personal details
- Born: Chu Chi-ying; 1935

James C. Y. Chu (Chinese: 祝基瀅; born 1935) is a Taiwanese politician and diplomat. He led the Overseas Community Affairs Council from 1996 to 1998 and was later named the representative of the Republic of China to Sweden.
