= Vice Premier of Taiwan =

Vice President of the Executive Yuan of the Republic of China
- 行政院副院長
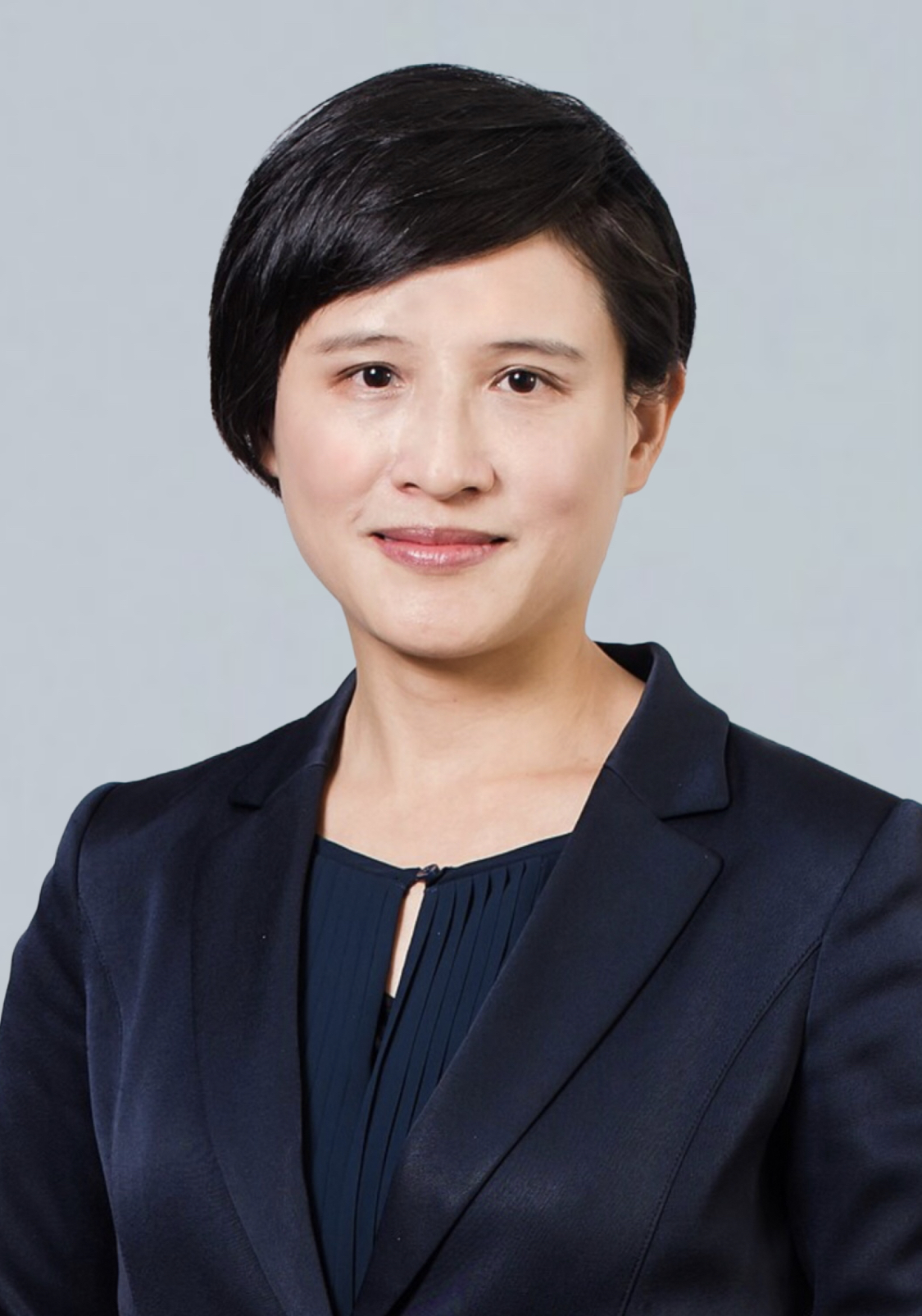
- Incumbent; Cheng Li-chun since 20 May 2024
- Executive Yuan
- Style: Madam Vice Premier (informal); Madam Vice President (within Executive Yuan); Her Excellency (diplomatic)
- Reports to: Premier
- Seat: Taipei, Taiwan
- Nominator: Premier
- Appointer: President
- Term length: No fixed term
- Formation: 28 October 1928; 98 years ago
- First holder: Feng Yuxiang
- Unofficial names: Vice Premier of Taiwan; Deputy Prime Minister of Taiwan
- Website: english.ey.gov.tw

The Vice Premier of the Republic of China (Chinese: 行政院副院長; pinyin: Xíngzhèng Yuàn Fù Yuànzhǎng; lit. 'Vice President of the Executive Yuan') serves as the deputy to the premier and is appointed by the president, on the recommendation of the Premier. The title of vice premier had been changed several times, so this list is divided into several sections. This includes both vice premiers of the Republic of China before 1949, when the seat of government was in Mainland China, and vice premiers since 1949, when the seat of government was relocated to Taiwan.

== List ==
=== Vice presidents of Executive Yuan of the National Government (1928–1948) ===
№	Portrait	Name (Birth–Death)	Term of office		Days	Political party	President
1		Feng Yuxiang 馮玉祥; Féng Yùxíang (1882–1948)	28 October 1928	11 October 1930	713	Kuomintang	Chiang Kai-shek
2		Soong Tse-ven (T. V. Soong) 宋子文; Sòng Ziwén (1891–1971)	11 October 1930	16 December 1931	447	Kuomintang	Chiang Kai-shek
3		Chen Mingshu 陳銘樞; Chén Míngshū (1889–1965)	16 December 1931	29 January 1932	410	Kuomintang	Lin Sen
(2)		Soong Tse-ven (T. V. Soong) 宋子文; Sòng Ziwén (1891–1971)	29 January 1932	4 November 1933	645	Kuomintang	Lin Sen
4		Kung Hsiang-hsi (H. H. Kung) 孔祥熙; Kǒng Xiángxī (1881–1967)	4 November 1933	1 January 1938	1519	Kuomintang	Lin Sen
5		Chang Ch'ün 張群; Zhāng Qún (1889–1990)	1 January 1938	11 December 1939	709	Kuomintang	Lin Sen
(4)		Kung Hsiang-hsi (H. H. Kung) 孔祥熙; Kǒng Xiángxī (1881–1967)	11 December 1939	4 June 1945	2002	Kuomintang	Lin Sen, Chiang Kai-shek
6		Weng Wenhao 翁文灝; Wēng Wénhào (1889–1971)	4 June 1945	18 April 1947	683	Kuomintang	Chiang Kai-shek
7		Wang Yunwu 王雲五; Wáng Yúnwǔ (1888–1979)	18 April 1947	24 May 1948	402	Independent	Chiang Kai-shek

=== Vice presidents of Executive Yuan of the Republic of China (1948–present) ===
№	Portrait	Name (Birth–Death)	Term of office		Days	Political party	President
8		Ku Meng-yu 顧孟餘; Gù Mèngyú (1888–1972)	24 May 1948	22 June 1948	29	Kuomintang	Chiang Kai-shek
9		Chang Li-sheng 張厲生; Zhāng Lìshēng (1901–1971)	22 June 1948	23 December 1948	184	Kuomintang	Chiang Kai-shek
10		Wu Tiecheng 吳鐵城; Wú Tiěchéng (1888–1953)	23 December 1948	21 March 1949	88	Kuomintang	Chiang Kai-shek
11		Chia Ching-teh 賈景德; Jiǎ Jǐngdé (1880–1960)	21 March 1949	12 June 1949	83	Kuomintang	Chiang Kai-shek
12		Chu Chia-hua 朱家驊; Zhū Jiāhuá (1893–1963)	12 June 1949	12 March 1950	273	Kuomintang	Chiang Kai-shek
(9)		Chang Li-sheng 張厲生; Zhāng Lìshēng (1901–1971)	12 March 1950	1 June 1954	1542	Kuomintang	Chiang Kai-shek
13		Huang Shao-ku 黃少谷; Huáng Shǎogǔ (1901–1996)	1 June 1954	15 July 1958	1505	Kuomintang	Chiang Kai-shek
(7)		Wang Yun-wu 王雲五; Wáng Yúnwǔ (1888–1978)	15 July 1958	16 December 1963	1980	Independent	Chiang Kai-shek
14		Yu Ching-tang 余井塘; Yú Jǐngtáng (1896–1985)	16 December 1963	1 June 1966	898	Kuomintang	Chiang Kai-shek
(13)		Huang Shao-ku 黃少谷; Huáng Shǎogǔ (1901–1996)	1 June 1966	1 July 1969	1126	Kuomintang	Chiang Kai-shek
15		Chiang Ching-kuo 蔣經國; Jiǎng Jīngguó (1910–1988)	1 July 1969	1 June 1972	1066	Kuomintang	Chiang Kai-shek
16		Hsu Ching-chung 徐慶鐘; Xú Qìngzhōng (1907–1996)	1 June 1972	1 December 1981	3470	Kuomintang	Chiang Kai-shek, Yen Chia-kan, Chiang Ching-kuo
17		Chiu Chuang-huan 邱創煥; Qīu Chuànghuàn (1925–2020)	1 December 1981	1 June 1984	913	Kuomintang	Chiang Ching-kuo
18		Lin Yang-kang 林洋港; Lín Yánggǎng (1927–2013)	1 June 1984	1 May 1987	1064	Kuomintang	Chiang Ching-kuo
19		Lien Chan 連戰; Lián Zhàn (1936–)	1 May 1987	22 July 1988	448	Kuomintang	Chiang Ching-kuo, Lee Teng-hui
20		Shih Chi-yang 施啟揚; Shī Qǐyáng (1935–2019)	22 July 1988	27 February 1993	1681	Kuomintang	Lee Teng-hui
21		Hsu Li-teh 徐立德; Xú Lìdé (1931–)	27 February 1993	1 September 1997	1647	Kuomintang	Lee Teng-hui
22		Chiang Hsiao-yen (John Chiang) 蔣孝嚴; Jiǎng Xiàoyán (1941–)	1 September 1997	11 December 1997	101	Kuomintang	Lee Teng-hui
23		Liu Chao-shiuan 劉兆玄; Liú Zhàoxuán (1943–)	11 December 1997	20 May 2000	891	Kuomintang	Lee Teng-hui
24		Yu Shyi-kun 游錫堃; Yóu Xíkūn (1948–)	20 May 2000	27 July 2000	68	Democratic Progressive	Chen Shui-bian
25		Chang Chun-hsiung 張俊雄; Zhāng Jùnxióng (1938–2025)	27 July 2000	6 October 2000	71	Democratic Progressive	Chen Shui-bian
26		Lai In-jaw 賴英照; Laì Yīnzhaò (1946–)	6 October 2000	1 February 2002	483	Independent	Chen Shui-bian
27		Lin Hsin-i 林信義; Lín Xìnyì (1946–)	1 February 2002	20 May 2004	839	Non-partisan	Chen Shui-bian
28		Yeh Chu-lan 葉菊蘭; Yè Júlán (1949–)	20 May 2004	1 February 2005	257	Democratic Progressive	Chen Shui-bian
28		Yeh Chu-lan 葉菊蘭; Yè Júlán (1949–)	First female vice president of any government branch.				
29		Wu Rong-i 吳榮義; Wú Róngyì (1939–)	1 February 2005	25 January 2006	358	Independent	Chen Shui-bian
30		Tsai Ing-wen 蔡英文; Cài Yīngwén (1956–)	25 January 2006	21 May 2007	481	Democratic Progressive	Chen Shui-bian
31		Chiou I-jen 邱義仁; Qiū Yìrén (1950–)	21 May 2007	6 May 2008	351	Democratic Progressive	Chen Shui-bian
—		Chang Chun-hsiung 張俊雄; Zhāng Jùnxióng (1938–2025)	6 May 2008	20 May 2008	14	Democratic Progressive	Chen Shui-bian
—		Chang Chun-hsiung 張俊雄; Zhāng Jùnxióng (1938–2025)	As acting.				
32		Chiu Chang-hsiung (Paul Chiu) 邱正雄; Qiū Zhèngxióng (1942–2025)	20 May 2008	10 September 2009	478	Kuomintang	Ma Ying-jeou
33		Chu Li-luan (Eric Chu) 朱立倫; Zhū Lìlún (1961–)	10 September 2009	17 May 2010	249	Kuomintang	Ma Ying-jeou
34		Chen Chun (Sean Chen) 陳冲; Chén Chōng (1949–)	17 May 2010	6 February 2012	630	Kuomintang	Ma Ying-jeou
35		Jiang Yi-huah 江宜樺; Jiāng Yihuà (1960–)	6 February 2012	18 February 2013	378	Independent → Kuomintang	Ma Ying-jeou
36		Mao Chi-kuo 毛治國; Máo Zhìguó (1948–)	18 February 2013	7 December 2014	657	Kuomintang	Ma Ying-jeou
37		Chang San-cheng (Simon Chang) 張善政; Zhāng Shànzhèng (1954–)	8 December 2014	1 February 2016	420	Independent	Ma Ying-jeou
38		Duh Tyzz-jiun (Woody Duh) 杜紫軍; Dù Zǐjūn (1959–)	1 February 2016	19 May 2016	108	Independent	Ma Ying-jeou
39		Lin Hsi-yao 林錫耀; Lín Xíyào (1961–)	20 May 2016	7 September 2017	475	Democratic Progressive	Tsai Ing-wen
40		Shih Jun-ji 施俊吉; Shī Jùnjí (1955–)	8 September 2017	13 January 2019	492	Independent	Tsai Ing-wen
41		Chen Chi-mai 陳其邁; Chén Qímài (1964–)	14 January 2019	19 June 2020	522	Democratic Progressive	Tsai Ing-wen
42		Shen Jong-chin 沈榮津; Shěn Róngjīn (1951–)	19 June 2020	30 January 2023	2336	Independent	Tsai Ing-wen
43		Cheng Wen-tsan 鄭文燦; Zhèng Wéncàn (1967–)	31 January 2023	20 May 2024	1380	Democratic Progressive	Tsai Ing-wen
44		Cheng Li-chun 鄭麗君; Zhèng Lìjūn (1969–)	20 May 2024	Incumbent	905	Democratic Progressive	Lai Ching-te

== See also ==
- List of premiers of the Republic of China
- List of presidents of the Republic of China
- List of vice presidents of the Republic of China
