= Chen Shyh-kwei =

Taiwanese politician

- 陳士魁
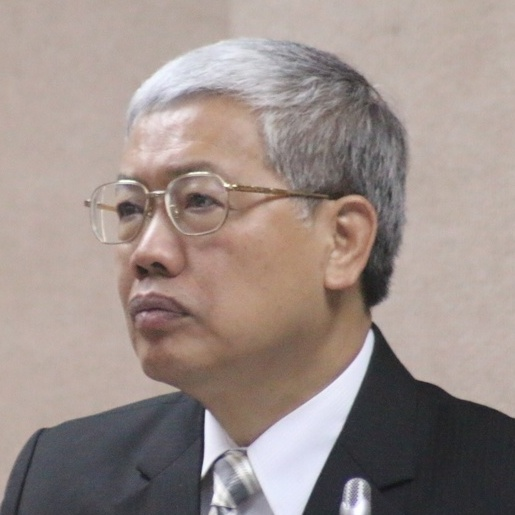

Minister of Overseas Community Affairs Council of the Republic of China
- In office 1 August 2013 – 20 May 2016
- Deputy: Chen Yu-mei; Hsin Shih-chang
- Vice: Roy Leu
- Preceded by: Wu Ying-yih
- Succeeded by: Wu Hsin-hsing

Governor of Fujian Province
- In office 18 February 2013 – 1 August 2013
- Preceded by: James Hsueh
- Succeeded by: Luo Ying-shay

Minister without Portfolio of the Executive Yuan
- In office 18 February 2013 – 1 August 2013
- Preceded by: James Hsueh
- Succeeded by: Joyce Feng

Secretary-General of the Executive Yuan
- In office 10 July 2012 – 18 February 2013
- Preceded by: Lin Yi-shih
- Succeeded by: Chen Wei-zen

Deputy Secretary-General of the Executive Yuan
- In office 2012–2012

Deputy Minister of Sports Affairs Council of the Republic of China
- In office 2010–2012
- Minister: Tai Hsia-ling
- Preceded by: Chen Hsien-chung
- Succeeded by: Chien Wei-chuan

Personal details
- Born: 8 April 1952 (age 74)
- Party: Kuomintang
- Education: National Taiwan University (BA); National Chengchi University (MA); Northern Illinois University (MPA)

Chen Shyh-kwei or Steven Chen (traditional Chinese: 陳士魁; simplified Chinese: 陈士魁; pinyin: Chén Shìkuí; born 8 April 1952), is a Taiwanese politician who was the Minister of the Overseas Community Affairs Council of the Executive Yuan from 1 August 2013 until 20 May 2016.

== Education ==
Chen earned his bachelor's degree in political science from National Taiwan University and master's degree in civil service education from National Chengchi University. He also studied public administration at Northern Illinois University in the United States.
