= Wu Ying-yih =

- 吳英毅
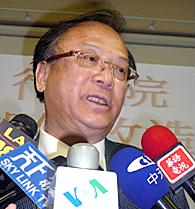

Minister of the Overseas Community Affairs Council (Overseas Chinese Affairs Commission until 12 November 2012)
- In office 20 May 2008 – 1 August 2013
- Deputy: Jen Hong
- Vice: Roy Leu
- Preceded by: Position established
- Succeeded by: Chen Shyh-kwei

Member of the Legislative Yuan
- In office 1 February 2005 – 31 January 2008
- Constituency: Overseas Chinese

Personal details
- Born: 15 January 1943 (age 83)
- Party: Kuomintang
- Education: National Taiwan University (MB); University of Illinois Chicago (MD, PhD)

Wu Ying-yih (traditional Chinese: 吳英毅; simplified Chinese: 吴英毅; pinyin: Wú Yīngyì, born 15 January 1943) is a Taiwanese surgeon and politician who served as the Minister of the Overseas Compatriot Affairs Commission, the Overseas Chinese Affairs Commission and subsequently the Overseas Community Affairs Council of the Executive Yuan from 2008 to 2013.

== Education ==
After graduating from National Chiayi Senior High School, Wu studied surgery as a medical student at National Taiwan University and received his Bachelor of Medicine (M.B.) in 1961. He then completed doctoral medical studies in the United States, where he earned a Doctor of Medicine (M.D.) and a Ph.D. specializing in surgery from the University of Illinois College of Medicine in 1969 and 1974, respectively. He completed a medical residency at Trinity Health Mid-Atlantic.

== Political career ==
Wu served as a member of the 6th Legislative Yuan after being elected in the 2004 Republic of China legislative election on 11 December 2004 and taking office on 1 February 2005.
