= Kao Chien-chih =

Taiwanese politician (born 1953)

Kao Chien-chih MLY
- 高建智
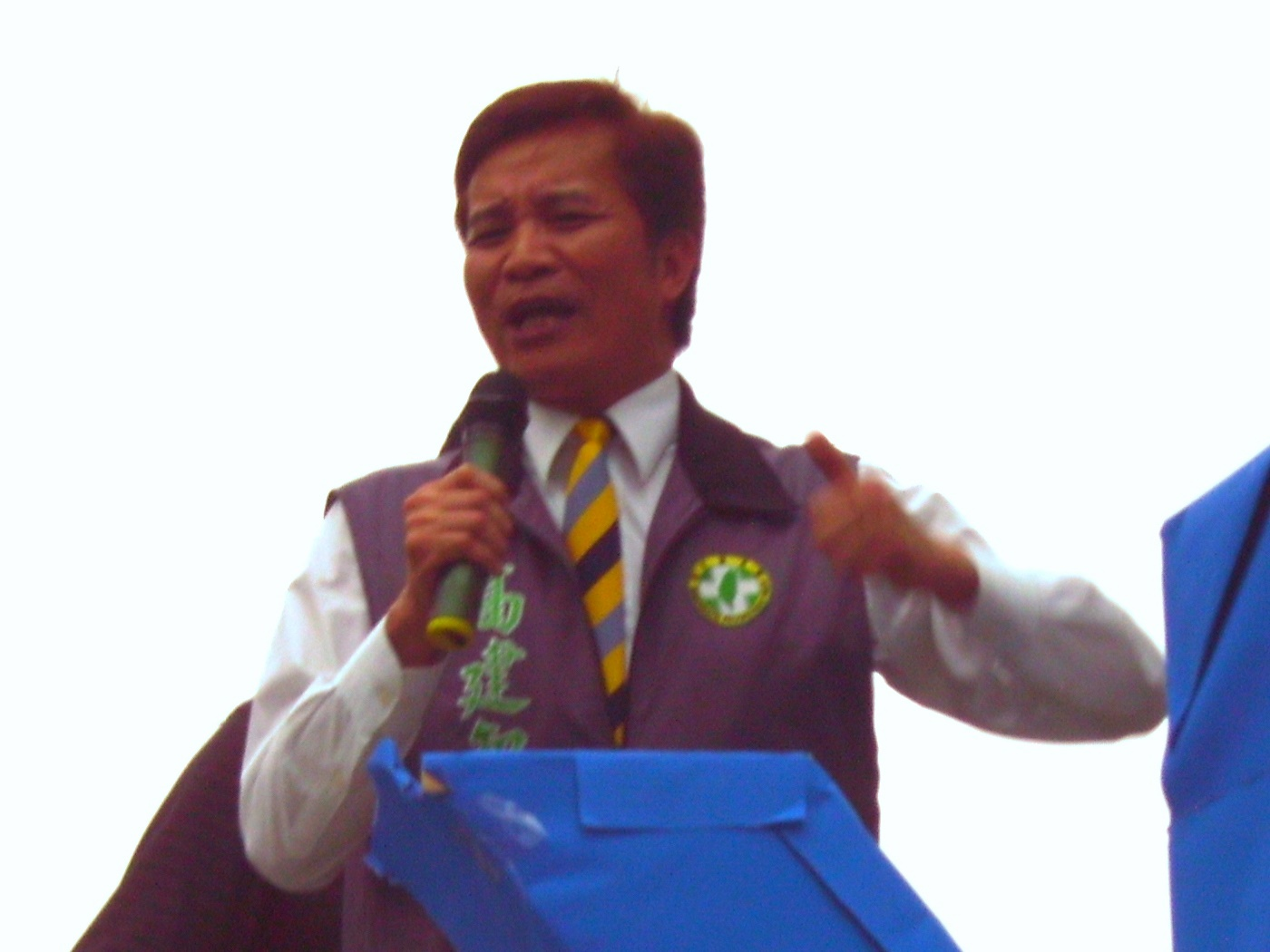

Deputy Minister of Overseas Community Affairs Council of the Republic of China
- In office 13 February 2018 – 19 May 2020
- Minister: Wu Hsin-hsing

Member of the Legislative Yuan
- In office 1 February 2005 – 31 January 2008
- Constituency: Taipei 1

Personal details
- Born: 17 August 1953 (age 72) Taipei County, Taiwan
- Party: Democratic Progressive Party
- Education: Shih Hsin University

Kao Chien-chih (Chinese: 高建智; born 17 August 1953) is a Taiwanese politician.

== Education ==
Kao is a graduate of Shih Hsin Vocational College, which later became Shih Hsin University.

== Political career ==
Kao was elected to the Legislative Yuan in 2004 after having served on the Taipei City Council. In 2007, he was involved repeated altercations with Kuomintang legislator Chu Fong-chi. In May, the Kuomintang accused Kao of slander for his comments on the party's assets. Kao and Yu Jane-daw filed a separate lawsuit against former Taipei mayor Ma Ying-jeou for allowing a private organization to use public land for profit. Kao was an early supporter of Frank Hsieh's 2008 presidential campaign. Hsieh was eventually named the Democratic Progressive Party's nominee, but lost the office to KMT candidate Ma Ying-jeou. Kao's own legislative reelection campaign was opposed by a coalition of LGBT rights activists, and he lost to KMT opponent Ting Shou-chung. Later, Kao served as the Democratic Progressive Party's deputy secretary-general. He lent support to the independent presidential campaign of activist Ellen Huang, but she dropped out in September 2011, before the registration deadline for the 2012 election. Kao was named a DPP legislative candidate for New Taipei's 11th district in the same election cycle, but was again defeated, this time by Lo Ming-tsai. Kao returned to the government in 2018, as the deputy minister of the Overseas Community Affairs Council.
