= Liu Chao-shiuan =

Taiwanese educator and politician

- 劉兆玄
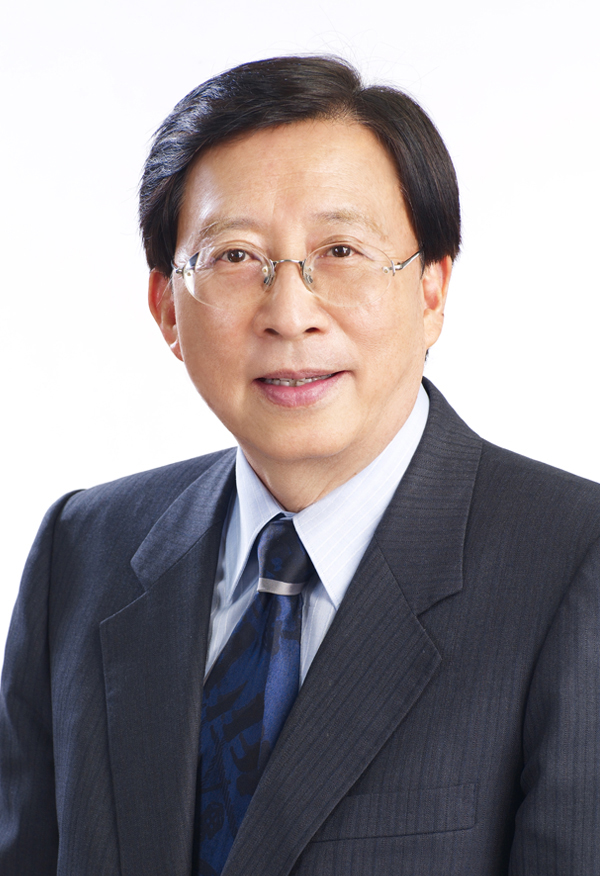

Premier of the Republic of China
- In office 20 May 2008 – 10 September 2009
- President: Ma Ying-jeou
- Vice Premier: Paul Chiu
- Preceded by: Chang Chun-hsiung
- Succeeded by: Wu Den-yih

Vice Premier of the Republic of China
- In office 11 December 1997 – 20 May 2000
- Premier: Vincent Siew
- Preceded by: John Chiang
- Succeeded by: Yu Shyi-kun

2nd Central Committee of the Kuomintang
- In office 20 May 2008 – 10 September 2009
- Preceded by: Ma Ying-jeou
- Succeeded by: Wu Den-yih

Minister of Transportation and Communications
- In office 27 February 1993 – 9 June 1996
- Premier: Lien Chan
- Preceded by: Eugene Chien
- Succeeded by: Tsay Jaw-yang

Personal details
- Born: 10 May 1943 (age 83) Liuyang, Hunan, Republic of China
- Party: Kuomintang
- Relations: Eric Liu (nephew)
- Education: National Taiwan University (BS); Université de Sherbrooke (MS); University of Toronto (PhD)

Liu Chao-shiuan (Chinese: 劉兆玄; pinyin: Liú Zhàoxuán; born 10 May 1943) is a Taiwanese chemist and politician. He is a former president of National Tsing Hua University (1987–1993) and Soochow University (2004–2008) and a former Premier of the Republic of China (2008–2009).

== Early life and education ==
Liu was born in Changsha, Hunan, in 1943. His family moved to Taiwan during the Great Retreat. After graduating from the Affiliated Senior High School of National Taiwan Normal University, he studied chemistry at National Taiwan University and graduated with his Bachelor of Science (B.S.) in 1965. Liu then completed graduate studies in Canada, where he earned a Master of Science (M.S.) in chemistry from the Université de Sherbrooke in 1968 and his Ph.D. from the University of Toronto in the field in 1971.

Liu is also an author, and, together with two of his brothers, has published novels of ancient Chinese rovers practicing martial arts under a pen name called "Shangguan Ding" (上官鼎).

Liu started to receive public attention when he was the President of National Tsing-hua University in Hsinchu before 1993. At that time, he and his school had just successfully hosted the annual unified college entrance examinations in Taiwan. He became the President of Soochow University in 2004.

Liu's nephew is Citizen University founder Eric Liu, who was a White House speechwriter and policy adviser for President Bill Clinton of the United States.

== ROC Transportation Ministry ==
Liu was subsequently served as Minister of Transportation and Communications from 1993 to 1996.

== ROC Vice Premiership ==
Liu next served as the Vice Premier from 1997 to 2000.

== ROC Premiership ==
In April 2008, Liu was asked by current President Ma Ying-jeou to serve as the Premier of the Republic of China. He accepted the post and his term as Premier took effect with Ma's incoming administration on 20 May 2008.

Liu and his Cabinet resigned en masse on 10 September 2009, with Wu Den-yih succeeding the post of Premiership.

Liu had suffered mounting criticism over the aftermath of Typhoon Morakot, and had initially tendered his resignation to President Ma in mid-August. Liu, however, was asked by President Ma to remain and oversee initial relief efforts as they were carried out. Liu said, during his resignation announcement, that 90% of subsidies have been distributed and 92% of those displaced have been temporarily relocated.

== See also ==
- Politics of the Republic of China
- Elections in the Republic of China

Academic offices
Preceded by Mao Kao-wen	President of National Tsing Hua University; 1987–1993	Succeeded by Richard Lee
Preceded by Liu Yuanjun	President of Soochow University; 2004–2008	Succeeded by Ma Chun-mei; Acting
Political offices
Preceded by Eugene Chien	Minister of Transportation and Communications of the Republic of China; 1993–1996	Succeeded by Tsay Jaw-yang
Preceded by Chang Chun-hsiung	Premier of the Republic of China; 2008–2009	Succeeded by Wu Den-yih
Party political offices
Preceded by Ma Ying-jeou	Central Committee of the Kuomintang; 2008–2009	Succeeded by Wu Den-yih
