= Chang San-cheng =

Taiwanese politician and engineer

- 張善政
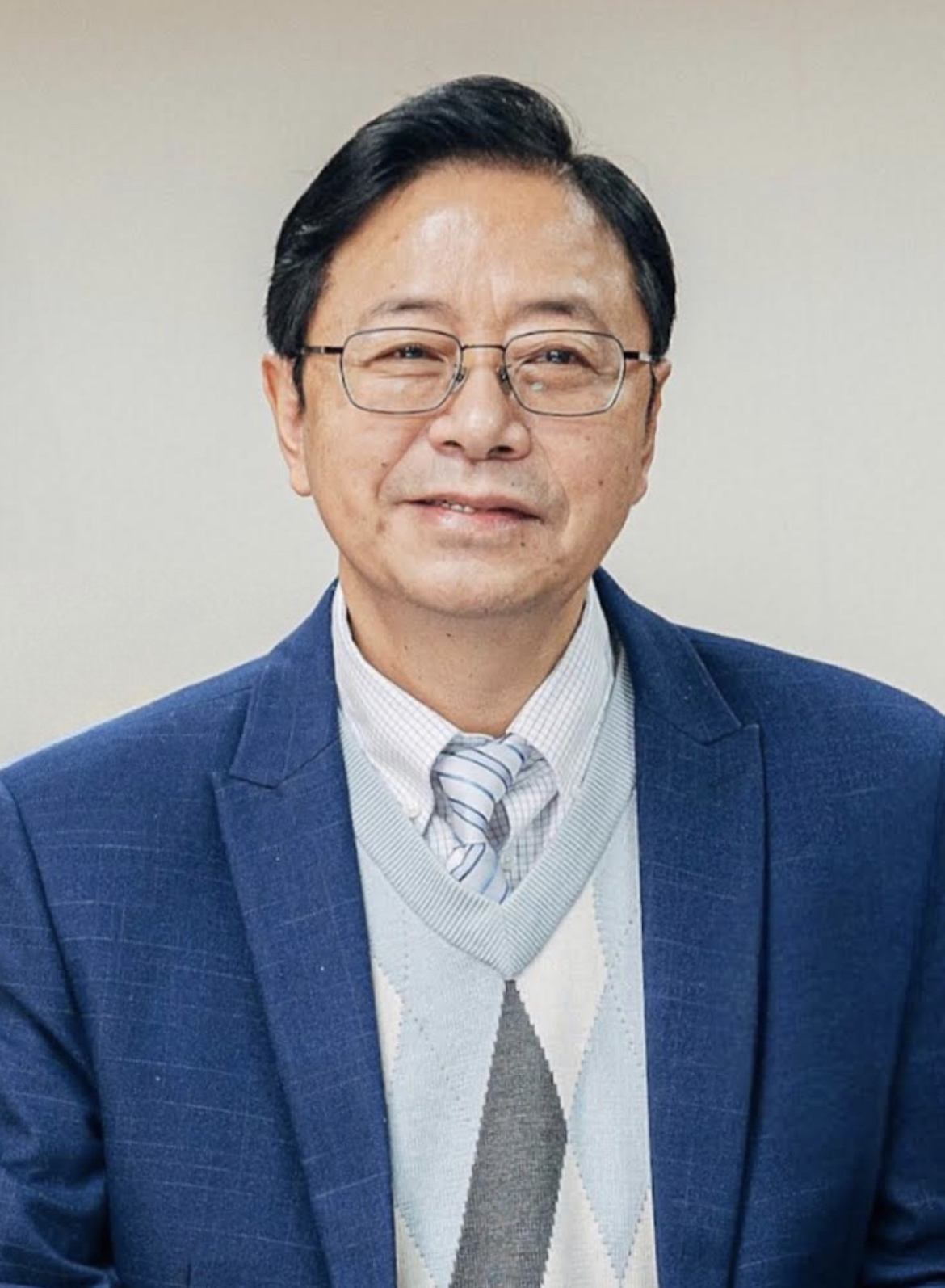
- Official portrait, 2022

2nd Mayor of Taoyuan
- Incumbent
- Assumed office 25 December 2022
- Deputy: See list: Wang Ming-ju Su Jun-bin
- Preceded by: Cheng Wen-tsan

27th Premier of the Republic of China
- In office 1 February 2016 – 20 May 2016; Acting: 18 January 2016 – 1 February 2016
- President: Ma Ying-jeou
- Deputy: Woody Duh
- Preceded by: Mao Chi-kuo
- Succeeded by: Lin Chuan

33rd Vice Premier of the Republic of China
- In office 7 December 2014 – 1 February 2016
- Prime Minister: Mao Chi-kuo; Himself (acting)
- Preceded by: Mao Chi-kuo
- Succeeded by: Woody Duh
Ministerial offices
1st Minister of Science and Technology
In office 3 March 2014 – 7 December 2014
Prime Minister	Jiang Yi-huah
Deputy	Lin Yi-bing
Preceded by	Cyrus Chu as Minister of National Science Council
Succeeded by	Lin Yi-bing (Acting)
Minister without Portfolio
In office 6 February 2012 – 2 March 2014
Prime Minister	Sean Chen; Jiang Yi-huah
Succeeded by	Chiang Been-huang

Personal details
- Born: 24 June 1954 (age 72) Taipei, Taiwan
- Party: Kuomintang (since 2022); Independent (before 2022)
- Education: National Taiwan University (BS); Stanford University (MS); Cornell University (PhD)
- Scientific career
- Fields: Civil engineering; Structural engineering
- Thesis: An Integrated Finite Element Nonlinear Shell Analysis System with Interactive Computer Graphics (1981)
- Doctoral advisor: Richard H. Gallagher; Yih-Hsing Pao

Chang San-cheng (Chinese: 張善政; pinyin: Zhāng Shànzhèng; born 24 June 1954), also known by his English name Simon Chang, is a Taiwanese civil engineer, academic, and politician who has served as the mayor of Taoyuan City since 2022. He previously served as the premier of the Republic of China from 1 February 2016 to 20 May 2016 after being appointed by President Ma Ying-jeou. Before assuming the premiership, he had served as vice premier from 8 December 2014 under the Mao Chi-kuo cabinet. Chang was the first nonpartisan premier of Taiwan.

Before entering politics, Chang graduated from National Taiwan University and earned a master's degree from Stanford University and his doctorate from Cornell University in engineering. He began an independent campaign for the 2020 Taiwanese presidential election, then suspended his run to join the Kuomintang ticket, headed by Han Kuo-yu. The pair lost to incumbent president Tsai Ing-wen and her running mate William Lai.

== Early life and education ==
Chang was born on 24 June 1954 in Taipei, Taiwan. His father was a native of Tianjin, China, who, after graduating from university, moved to Taiwan in 1948, where he worked for the Chinese Petroleum Corporation at its Kaohsiung refinery. His mother, a native of Tainan, also worked for the company, where his parents met before marrying and moving to Taipei. As a child, Chang developed an interest in engineering through his father, a civil engineer.

Chang attended Taipei Municipal Datong Junior High School, graduating in 1969. He then graduated from Taipei Municipal Chien Kuo High School in 1972. After high school, he graduated from National Taiwan University with a Bachelor of Science (B.S.) in civil engineering in 1976. As an undergraduate, he completed an internship on the construction of the North-link line in Hualien County and helped to survey bridge piers near Xincheng.

Chang completed graduate studies in the United States, earning a Master of Science (M.S.) in civil engineering and structural engineering from Stanford University in 1977 and his Ph.D. in civil engineering from Cornell University in 1981 with a specialization in computer graphics. His doctoral dissertation, completed under engineers Richard H. Gallagher and Yih-Hsing Pao, was titled, "An Integrated Finite Element Nonlinear Shell Analysis System with Interactive Computer Graphics."

== Academic career ==
After completing his doctorate, Chang returned to Taiwan and joined the civil engineering faculty of National Taiwan University (NTU), where he taught successively as a lecturer, associate professor, and full professor until 1990. At NTU, Chang introduced some of the country's first courses in computer graphics and computer-aided design. The civil engineering department also supported the establishment of a computer graphics laboratory under Chang's direction, where he pursued applications of computer graphics to civil engineering. He was promoted to a full professorship in 1983.

While at NTU, Chang became involved in plans by the National Science Council (NSC) to establish a national supercomputing facility; he and NTU computer science professor Lin Yi-peng were assigned to prepare the proposal for what became the National Center for High-Performance Computing (NCHC). He became the center's first director and headed it from 1991 through 1997. His responsibilities during the center's establishment extended from construction of its facilities to the procurement of its supercomputer equipment. He then was the director of the NSC's Department of Planning and Evaluation from 1998 to 2000. In that position, he wrote the first government white paper on science and technology (S&T).

== Acer and Google executive (2000–2012) ==
Chang left the NSC for the private sector in 2000 and joined the electronics corporation Acer. In August 2000, Acer recruited Chang to help develop its data-center business, and he became general manager of the newly-established Acer subsidiary An-Hsin Information Services (安碁資訊), which was created to provide internet data-center and information-technology services. The company initially offered services including website and application hosting, corporate information-technology outsourcing, data storage and backup, and streaming-media infrastructure. Chang also served from 2000 to 2010 as the vice president of Acer's e-Enabling Services Business Group, whose operations included data-center and information-security services.

In 2010, Chang was recruited by Google and became the company's regional director of hardware operations in Asia, a position he held until 2012. His responsibilities included the planning, construction and operation of Google's data-center infrastructure in Asia. In September 2011, Google announced that it would invest more than US$100 million in a new data center in Changhua County, one of three data centers then being planned by the company in East Asia; Chang was one of the officials responsible for Google's Asian data-center expansion. Chang also helped the company to establish the a facility in Changhua, the company's first data center in Taiwan.

== Early political career (2012–2015) ==
Chang entered national politics in February 2012, when he left his position as Google's director of hardware operations in Asia to accept an appointment as a minister without portfolio in the Executive Yuan under President Ma Ying-jeou. As a minister without portfolio responsible for technology policy, Chang promoted initiatives involving cloud computing, information and communications technology, and open data.

On 26 February 2014, the Executive Yuan announced that Chang would become the inaugural minister of the newly-established Ministry of Science and Technology, which was being formed through a reorganization of the National Science Council. He assumed the position on 3 March 2014. The Executive Yuan stated that Chang's experience in the technology industry would help the new ministry promote technological innovation and entrepreneurship.

On 5 December 2014, the Executive Yuan announced that Chang would be promoted to vice premier in the cabinet headed by Mao Chi-kuo. Chang assumed the vice premiership on 8 December, succeeding Mao, who had become premier following the ruling KMT's defeat in the 2014 Taiwanese local elections. He served as vice premier until February 2016.

== Senior political career ==
=== Caretaker premiership (2016) ===
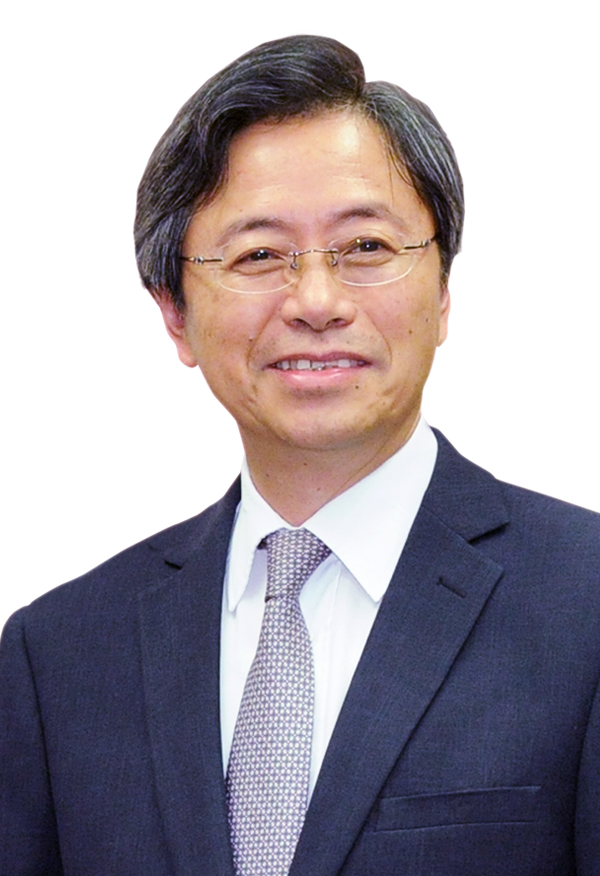
Official portrait as Premier, 2016

On January 16, 2016, after the KMT lost the presidency and its majority in the Legislative Yuan at the 2016 Taiwanese general election, the then-incumbent premier Mao Chi-kuo resigns and refuse to stay at the position, Chang served as the acting premier while Mao is outgoing.

On 1 February, the then-incumbent President Ma Ying-jeou approve resignation of Mao Chi-kuo, and appointed Chang to form the cabinet to serve the remaining four months during the period of transition of power. As a result, Chang became the first nonpartisan premier of the history in Taiwan's politics.

=== 2020 Presidential campaign ===
Chang announced his independent candidacy for the 2020 Taiwan presidential election on 17 February 2019. Chang later joined the presidential campaign of Kuomintang candidate Han Kuo-yu as an adviser without halting his own campaign. In August 2019, Han formed a national policy advisory group headed by Chang. Chang's selection as the Kuomintang's 2020 Taiwan presidential election vice presidential candidate was announced on 11 November 2019.

Party	Candidate		Votes	Percentage
Party	President	Vice president	Votes	Percentage
Democratic Progressive Party	Tsai Ing-wen	William Lai	8,170,231	57.13%
Kuomintang	Han Kuo-yu	Chang San-cheng	5,522,119	38.61%
People First Party	James Soong	Sandra Yu	608,590	4.26%
Total			14,300,940	100%
Valid votes			14,300,940	98.87%
Invalid votes			163,631	1.13%
Votes cast / turnout			14,464,571	74.90%
Eligible voters			19,311,105	

=== Taoyuan mayoralty (2022–) ===
In May 2022, Chang was nominated by the Kuomintang as its candidate in the local elections for the Taoyuan mayoralty after a closed-door meeting of the party's Central Standing Committee. Chang was elected by 52.02% percentage of votes and assumed office in December 2022.

== See also ==
- List of vice premiers of the Republic of China

Political offices
Preceded by Mao Chi-kuo	Vice Premier of the Republic of China; 2014–2016	Succeeded by Woody Duh
Preceded by Mao Chi-kuo	Premier of the Republic of China; 2016	Succeeded by Lin Chuan
Preceded by Cheng Wen-tsan	Mayor of Taoyuan; 2022–present	Incumbent
