= Mao Chi-kuo =

Taiwanese civil engineer and politician (born 1948)

- 毛治國
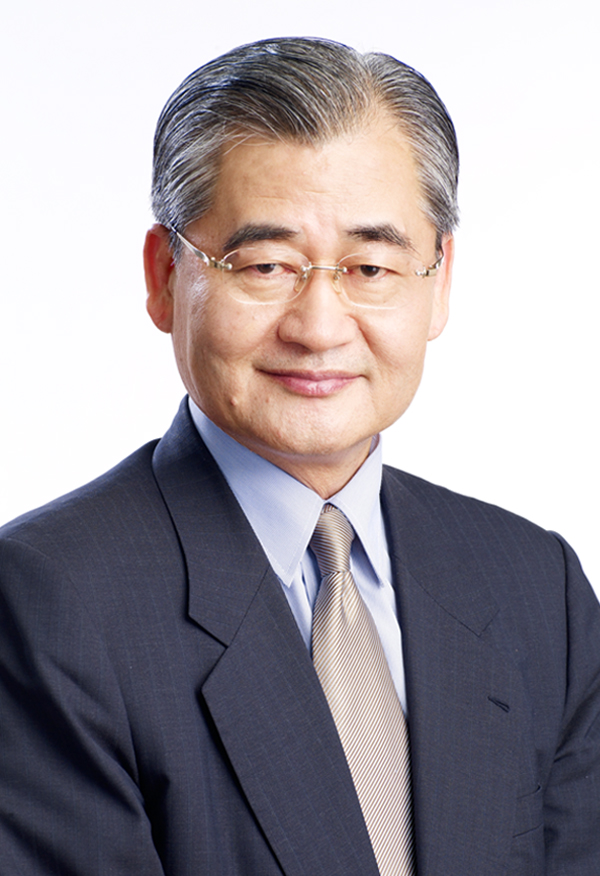
- Official portrait, 2014

26th Premier of the Republic of China
- In office 7 December 2014 – 18 January 2016
- President: Ma Ying-jeou
- Deputy: Chang San-cheng
- Preceded by: Jiang Yi-huah
- Succeeded by: Chang San-cheng

Vice Premier of the Republic of China
- In office 18 February 2013 – 7 December 2014
- Prime Minister: Jiang Yi-huah
- Preceded by: Jiang Yi-huah
- Succeeded by: Chang San-cheng

Minister of Transportation and Communications
- In office 20 May 2008 – 17 February 2013
- Prime Minister: Liu Chao-shiuan; Wu Den-yih; Sean Chen
- Preceded by: Tsai Duei
- Succeeded by: Yeh Kuang-shih

Personal details
- Born: 4 October 1948 (age 78) Fenghua, Zhejiang, China
- Party: Kuomintang
- Education: National Cheng Kung University (BS); Asian Institute of Technology (ME); Massachusetts Institute of Technology (PhD)
- Scientific career
- Fields: Civil engineering
- Thesis: Integrating technological and organizational perspectives: An approach to improve rail motive power management (1983)

Mao Chi-kuo (Chinese: 毛治國; pinyin: Máo Zhìguó; born 4 October 1948) is a Taiwanese engineering professor and politician. A member of the Kuomintang (KMT), he served as the premier of the Republic of China from 2014 to 2016 and was previously the president of the Executive Yuan from 2014 to 2016.

== Early life and education ==
Mao was born on 4 October 1948 in Fenghua, Zhejiang, China. His parents were Bin-Shi and Pau-Jen Mao. He is a relative of Mao Fumei, the first wife of Chiang Kai-shek. When he was an infant, he moved with his family to Taiwan and was raised in Taichung, where he graduated from the Datong Elementary School in 1961. He later attended Taichung First Senior High School.

Mao graduated from National Cheng Kung University with his Bachelor of Science (B.S.) degree in civil engineering in 1971. In the same year, he obtained a civil engineering license. After graduation, he completed officer training at a military engineering school in Neihu and was assigned to Matsu, where he served for fifteen months on Beigan as an engineering officer. He then received a scholarship to pursue graduate studies in Bangkok, Thailand, at the Asian Institute of Technology, where he earned a Master of Engineering (M.E.) in regional development in 1975.

Mao completed doctoral studies in the United States, earning his Ph.D. in civil engineering and environmental engineering from the Massachusetts Institute of Technology (MIT) in 1982. As a doctoral student at MIT, he was a member of the Tech Model Railroad Club and studied as a fellow of the Association of American Railroads and Renfe. His doctoral dissertation, completed under civil engineering professor Marvin Manheim, was titled, "Integrating Technological and Organizational Perspectives: An Approach to Improve Rail Motive Power Management".

== Academic career ==
After receiving his doctorate, Mao returned to Taiwan and joined the faculty of National Chiao Tung University (NCTU). He was also offered a position at National Taiwan University, but chose NCTU instead. He taught as an associate professor, then full professor, between 1982 to 1987, during which he became the chair of its management science department.

Mao returned to NCTU in 2003 as a chair professor in its College of Management. He held the chair professorship from 2003 to 2006, after which he became its dean from 2006 until 2008. By 2012, he was the author of more than 100 journal articles, reports, conference papers and essays. He specialized in intelligent transportation systems, telecommunications, and complex systems.

After leaving the premiership, Mao returned to teaching in NCTU's College of Management. After the creation of National Yang Ming Chiao Tung University (NYCU), he became a professor emeritus in its Institute of Business and Management. He also was a chair professor at Chung Hua University from August 2018 to January 2026, and a law and business chair professor at Soochow University.

== Political career ==
=== MOTC (1987–2000) ===
In 1987, Mao left National Chiao Tung University to serve as the chief secretary of the Ministry of Transportation and Communications (MOTC) as chief secretary, serving in the position until 1989. His appointment came after NCTU president Kuo Nan-hung (郭南宏), who had become transportation minister, recruited Mao and several other younger academics from the university to the ministry. As chief secretary, Mao primarily focused on deregulation.

Mao was appointed director-general of the Tourism Administration of MOTC in 1989 and remained in that position until 1991. During his tenure, the bureau introduced the Taiwan Culinary Exhibition and developed a lantern festival that later became the Taiwan Lantern Festival. In September 1991, Mao left the Tourism Bureau to become director of the MOTC's Preparatory Office of High Speed Rail, the agency responsible for planning what became the Taiwan High Speed Rail. During his time as director, the office developed engineering and land-use plans for the proposed north–south route and studied the possibility of using private investment to construct the system.

Mao became the administrative deputy minister of transportation and communications in 1993, a position he held through 2000. After the Legislative Yuan rejected government funding for the high-speed-rail project and directed that it be opened to private investment, Mao was assigned to work on legislation establishing a legal framework for privately financed transportation infrastructure. He participated in drafting the "Act for Promotion of Private Participation in Transportation and Communication Infrastructure Projects (獎勵民間參與交通建設條例)", which was enacted by the Legislative Yuan in November 1994 and implemented on 5 December. While serving as deputy minister, Mao concurrently headed the Civil Aeronautics Administration for several months in 1994. His appointment followed the April 1994 crash of China Airlines Flight 140 at Nagoya. Mao's other positions during this period included membership on the Executive Yuan's National Information Infrastructure Project committee from 1994 to 2000 and service on Chunghwa Telecom's board of directors from 1995 to 2000.

=== Chunghwa Telecom (2000–2003) ===
Mao left the Ministry of Transportation and Communications to become chairman of the state-controlled Chunghwa Telecom on 21 August 2000. During his tenure, he reformed the company to compete in fixed-line, mobile and Internet services. He also sought to expand the company's traditional voice-telephone business while attempting to recover its market share in mobile communications. In December 2002, the government sold approximately 13 percent of Chunghwa Telecom for NT$65.6 billion to a group of institutional investors led by Cathay Life Insurance, Taiwan Cellular and Fubon Financial Holding, reducing the government's ownership from about 95 percent to 81.5 percent. Mao had opposed the MOTC's decision to reduce government shares to a small number of private investors. In January 2003, Mao was replaced with former transportation vice minister Hochen Tan. That same year, he was appointed an advisor to the Executive Yuan.

=== MOTC minister (2008–2013) ===
After the 2008 presidential election, Premier Liu Chao-shiuan announced in April 2008 that Mao would lead the Ministry of Transportation and Communications in the incoming administration of president-elect Ma Ying-jeou. Ma appointed Mao minister of transportation and communications, as well as a minister without portfolio of the Executive Yuan, on 20 May 2008.

In 2009, Mao rejected government purchase of the Taiwan High Speed Rail Corporation (THSRC) but supported greater government participation in its management. He also advanced the Suhua Highway Improvement Project, intended to provide a safer route between Yilan and Hualien without reviving the previously-proposed Suhua Freeway. The project received heightened attention after landslides caused by Typhoon Megi killed 26 people on the Suhua Highway in October 2010; it passed environmental review the following month and began construction in January 2011.

=== Vice premier (2013–2014) ===
In the cabinet of Premier Jiang Yi-huah, Mao was appointed Vice Premier of the Republic of China, taking office on 18 February 2013. One of Mao's principal economic responsibilities was coordinating the government's proposed Free Economic Pilot Zones (FEPZs). In March 2013, Mao presented the first-stage plan, under which Taiwan's six existing free-trade port zones, Taoyuan International Airport and the Pingtung Agricultural Biotechnology Park would serve as pilot areas before the program was expanded through legislation.

Mao organized a government response to the Chang Chi Foodstuff scandal, in which cooking oils were found to have been adulterated and illegally colored. In July 2014, Mao announced the establishment of a new food-safety task force under the Executive Yuan's Board of Food and Medicine Safety. He was also the chair of an Executive Yuan task force established after anti-Chinese riots in Vietnam in May 2014 damaged hundreds of Taiwanese-owned factories. The task force reviewed the losses sustained by Taiwanese companies and government efforts to seek compensation and guarantees of protection from Vietnamese authorities.

=== Premier (2014–2016) ===
Following the 2014 Taiwanese local elections, in which the KMT experienced major losses, Premier Jiang Yi-huah resigned and Ma selected Mao to succeed Jiang on 3 December 2014. Mao was sworn in as premier on 8 December, with Chang San-cheng as vice premier; most members of Jiang's cabinet remained in office to keep continuity.

Following the KMT's defeat in both the presidential and legislative elections on 16 January 2016, Mao announced his resignation. He led the Cabinet in a mass resignation on 18 January 2016 despite President Ma's request that he remain in office. Ma subsequently accepted Mao's resignation and appointed Vice Premier Chang to succeed him.

== Personal life ==
Mao is married to Joan Yin-Yin Chien Mao, a former traffic guide.

== See also ==
- List of premiers of the Republic of China
- List of vice premiers of the Republic of China

Political offices
Preceded by Jiang Yi-huah	Vice Premier of the Republic of China; 2013–2014	Succeeded by Chang San-cheng
Preceded by Jiang Yi-huah	Premier of the Republic of China; 2014–2016	Succeeded by Chang San-cheng
