= Overseas Community Affairs Council =

Taiwan government agency

- 僑務委員會

Agency overview
- Formed: October 1926 (in Guangzhou, Guangdong)
- Jurisdiction: Republic of China (Taiwan)
- Headquarters: Zhongzheng, Taipei, Taiwan
- Ministers responsible: Lee Yen-hui, Minister; Lai Li-ying, Deputy Minister; Vice Minister
- Parent agency: Executive Yuan
- Website: www.ocac.gov.tw

Overseas Community Affairs Council
- Traditional Chinese: 僑務委員會
- Simplified Chinese: 侨务委员会
Transcriptions
Standard Mandarin
- Hanyu Pinyin: Qiáo Wù Wěiyuánhuì
Southern Min
- Hokkien POJ: Kiâu-bū Úi-oân-hōe

The Overseas Community Affairs Council (OCAC; Chinese: 僑務委員會; pinyin: Qiáo Wù Wěiyuánhuì) is a cabinet-level council of the Executive Yuan of the Republic of China (Taiwan). The council was founded in 1926 in Canton (Guangzhou) in Kwangtung (Guangdong) Province.

Its main objective is to serve as a cultural, education, economic and informational exchanges organization between Taiwan and the overseas Taiwanese and Chinese descent communities. Its remit is not limited to expatriates from Taiwan, but includes all ethnic Taiwanese and Chinese living in a foreign country who "identify with the Republic of China (ROC)".

With the evolution of the political landscape and the Taiwanese localization movement, the organization now puts emphasis not only in Mandarin, but also on Taiwanese Hokkien, Hakka, and other local languages. It offers information about aboriginal tribes in Taiwan, and its overseas offices may serve, in addition to the Taipei Economic and Cultural Representative Offices.

== Organizational structures ==
- Department of Policy Research and Development
- Department of Overseas Chinese Network Services
- Department of Overseas Chinese Education
- Department of Overseas Chinese Business
- Department of Overseas Chinese Student Counseling
- Secretariat Office
- Personnel Office
- Civil Service Ethics Office
- Accounting and Statistics Office
- Information Management Office
- Overseas Chinese News Agency
- Legal Affairs Committee

== Title changes ==
Name	Time in use
Overseas Chinese Affairs Commission	October 1926 – April 2006
Overseas Compatriot Affairs Commission	April 2006 – 1 September 2012
Overseas Chinese Affairs Commission	1 September 2012 – 12 November 2012
Overseas Community Affairs Council	Since 12 November 2012

The English title of the council was changed from "Overseas Chinese Affairs Commission" to "Overseas Compatriot Affairs Commission" in 2006, officially to "avoid being confused as a governmental body of the People's Republic of China", under the desinicization policies of independence-leaning President Chen Shui-bian of the Democratic Progressive Party. However, its English acronym OCAC and Chinese name remained the same, to reduce the expense for its official title change. After the Kuomintang renewed its mandate in the 2012 election, the official English name was changed back to the original.

However, in November 2012 there was a controversy when it was discovered that the OCAC used simplified Chinese characters in some of its teaching materials. Amid threats in November 2012 from Democratic Progressive Party legislators to freeze the OCAC's budget, its director relented to demands to rename the OCAC to the ROC (Taiwan) Overseas Community Affairs Council.

== Ministers ==
Political Party: Kuomintang Democratic Progressive Party Non-partisan/ unknown

No.	Name	Term of Office		Days	Political Party	Cabinet
1	Chen Shuren 陳樹人	27 April 1932	1 May 1947	5482	Kuomintang	Wang Jingwei; Chiang Kai-shek II; H. H. Kung; Chiang Kai-shek III; T. V. Soong; Chang Ch'ün
2	Liu Weichi 劉維熾	1 May 1947	28 December 1948	607	Kuomintang	Chang Ch'ün; Weng Wenhao; Sun Fo
3	Dai Kuisheng 戴愧生	28 December 1948	19 May 1950	507	Kuomintang	Sun Fo; He Yingqin; Yan Xishan; Chen Cheng I
4	George Yeh 葉公超	19 May 1950	16 April 1952	698	Kuomintang	Chen Cheng I
5	Zheng Yanfen 鄭彥棻	16 April 1952	16 July 1958	2282	Kuomintang	Chen Cheng I Yu Hung-chun
6	Chen Qingwen 陳清文	16 July 1958	24 June 1960	709	Kuomintang	Chen Cheng II
7	Chow Shu-kai 周書楷	24 June 1960	3 December 1962	892	Kuomintang	Chen Cheng II
8	Kao Hsin 高信	3 December 1962	1 June 1972	3468	Kuomintang	Chen Cheng II; Yen Chia-kan
9	Mao Sung-nian 毛松年	1 June 1972	1 June 1984	4383	Kuomintang	Chiang Ching-kuo; Sun Yun-suan
10	Tseng Kuang-hsun 曾廣順	1 June 1984	27 February 1993	3193	Kuomintang	Yu Kuo-hua; Lee Huan; Hau Pei-tsun
11	John Chang 章孝嚴	27 February 1993	10 June 1996	1199	Kuomintang	Lien Chan
12	James C. Y. Chu 祝基瀅	10 June 1996	5 February 1998	605	Kuomintang	Lien Chan; Vincent Siew
13	Chiao Jen-ho 焦仁和	5 February 1998	20 May 2000	835	Kuomintang	Vincent Siew
14	Chang Fu-mei 張富美	20 May 2000	19 May 2008	2921	Democratic Progressive Party	Tang Fei; Chang Chun-hsiung I Yu Shyi-kun; Frank Hsieh; Su Tseng-chang I Chang Chun-hsiung II
15	Wu Ying-yih 吳英毅	20 May 2008	1 August 2013	1899	Kuomintang	Liu Chao-shiuan; Wu Den-yih; Chen Chun; Jiang Yi-huah
16	Chen Shyh-kwei 陳士魁	1 August 2013	19 May 2016	1022	Kuomintang	Jiang Yi-huah; Mao Chi-kuo; Chang San-cheng
17	Wu Hsin-hsing 吳新興	20 May 2016	20 May 2020	1460		Lin Chuan; William Lai; Su Tseng-chang II
18	Tung Chen-yuan 童振源	20 May 2020	30 January 2023	985	Democratic Progressive Party	Su Tseng-chang II
19	Hsu Chia-ching 徐佳青	31 January 2023	7 October 2026	1345	Democratic Progressive Party	Chen Chien-jen; Cho Jung-tai
-	Lee Yen-hui 李姸慧	7 October 2026	Incumbent	1	Democratic Progressive Party	Cho Jung-tai

== Transportation ==
The council is accessible within walking distance North East from NTU Hospital Station of the Taipei Metro.

== See also ==
- Overseas Taiwanese
- Overseas Chinese
- Political status of Taiwan
- Executive Yuan
- Taiwan Center for Mandarin Learning
- Overseas Chinese Affairs Office in mainland China
