= List of female cabinet ministers of Taiwan =

These are the list of female leaders, ministers or head of ministry-level agencies within the government of the Republic of China.

denotes the first female minister of that particular department.

Minister	Position	Year Appointed	Administration
Government
Tsai Ing-wen	President of the Republic of China	2016	Herself
Annette Lu	Vice President of the Republic of China	2000	Chen Shui-bian
Chang Po-ya	President of the Control Yuan	2014	Ma Ying-jeou
Chen Chu	President of the Control Yuan	2020	Tsai Ing-wen
Minister of Culture
Lung Ying-tai	Minister of Culture	2012	Ma Ying-jeou
Cheng Li-chun	Minister of Culture	2016	Tsai Ing-wen
Minister of Economic Affairs
Christine Tsung	Minister of Economic Affairs	2002	Chen Shui-bian
Ho Mei-yueh	Minister of Economic Affairs	2004	Chen Shui-bian
Wang Mei-hua	Minister of Economic Affairs	2020	Tsai Ing-wen
Minister of Finance
Shirley Kuo	Minister of Finance	1988	Lee Teng-hui
Christina Liu	Minister of Finance	2012	Ma Ying-jeou
Chuang Tsui-yun	Minister of Finance	2023	Tsai Ing-wen
Minister of Health and Welfare
Chang Po-ya	Minister of the Department of Health	1990	Lee Teng-hui
Minister of Interior
Yeh Chin-fong	Minister of Interior	1997	Lee Teng-hui
Chang Po-ya	Minister of Interior	2000	Chen Shui-bian
Liu Shyh-fang	Minister of Interior	2024	Lai Ching-tai
Minister of Justice
Yeh Chin-fong	Minister of Justice	1999	Lee Teng-hui
Wang Ching-feng	Minister of Justice	2008	Ma Ying-jeou
Luo Ying-shay	Minister of Justice	2013	Ma Ying-jeou
Minister of Labor
Chen Chu	Minister of the Council of Labor Affairs	2000	Chen Shui-bian
Wang Ju-hsuan	Minister of the Council of Labor Affairs	2008	Ma Ying-jeou
Lin Mei-chu	Minister of Labor	2017	Tsai Ing-wen
Hsu Ming-chun	Minister of Labor	2018	Tsai Ing-wen
Ministry of Transport and Communications
Yeh Chu-lan	Minister of Transport and Communications	2000	Chen Shui-bian
Kuo Yao-chi	Minister of Transport and Communications	2006	Chen Shui-bian
Minister without Portfolio
Yeh Chin-fong	Minister without Portfolio	1996	Lee Teng-hui
Shirley Kuo Wang-jung	Minister without Portfolio	1998	Lee Teng-hui
Yan Chung Chin	Minister without Portfolio	2000	Chen Shui-bian
Kuo Yao-chi	Minister without Portfolio	2002	Chen Shui-bian
Fu Li-yeh	Minister without Portfolio	2004	Chen Shui-bian
Ho Mei-yueh	Minister without Portfolio	2006	Chen Shui-bian
Luo Ying-shay	Minister without Portfolio	2011	Ma Ying-jeou
Central Election Commission
Chang Po-ya	Chairperson of Central Election Commission	2010	Ma Ying-jeou
Mongolian and Tibetan Affairs Commission
Luo Ying-shay	Minister of Mongolian and Tibetan Affairs Commission	2011	Ma Ying-jeou
Jaclyn Tsai	Minister of Mongolian and Tibetan Affairs Commission	2013	Ma Ying-jeou
National Communications Commission
Chan Ting-I	Chairperson of National Communications Commission	2016	Tsai Ing-wen
Council for Economic Planning and Development
Shirley Kuo Wang-jung	Minister of the Council for Economic Planning and Development	1993	Lee Teng-hui
Ho Mei-yueh	Minister of the Council for Economic Planning and Development	2007	Chen Shui-bian
Christina Liu	Minister of the Council for Economic Planning and Development	2010	Ma Ying-jeou
Hakka Affairs Council
Yeh Chu-lan	Minister of the Hakka Affairs Council	2002	Chen Shui-bian
Chung Wan-mei	Minister of the Hakka Affairs Council	2016	Ma Ying-jeou
Mainland Affairs Council
Tsai Ing-wen	Minister of the Mainland Affairs Council	2000	Chen Shui-bian
Lai Shin-yuan	Minister of the Mainland Affairs Council	2008	Ma Ying-jeou
Katharine Chang	Minister of the Mainland Affairs Council	2016	Tsai Ing-wen
Overseas Community Affairs Council
Chang Fu-mei	Minister of the Overseas Compatriot Affairs Commission	2000	Chen Shui-bian
Directorate-General of Budget, Accounting and Statistics
Shih Su-mei	Minister of Directorate-General of Budget, Accounting and Statistics	2008	Ma Ying-jeou
Government Information Office
Chung Chin	Minister of Government Information Office	2000	Chen Shui-bian
Vanessa Shih	Minister of Government Information Office	2008	Ma Ying-jeou

== See also ==
- Cabinet
- Cabinet of Taiwan
- Politics of Taiwan
