= First Su cabinet =

41st premier of the Republic of China

- 41st premiership of Republic of China

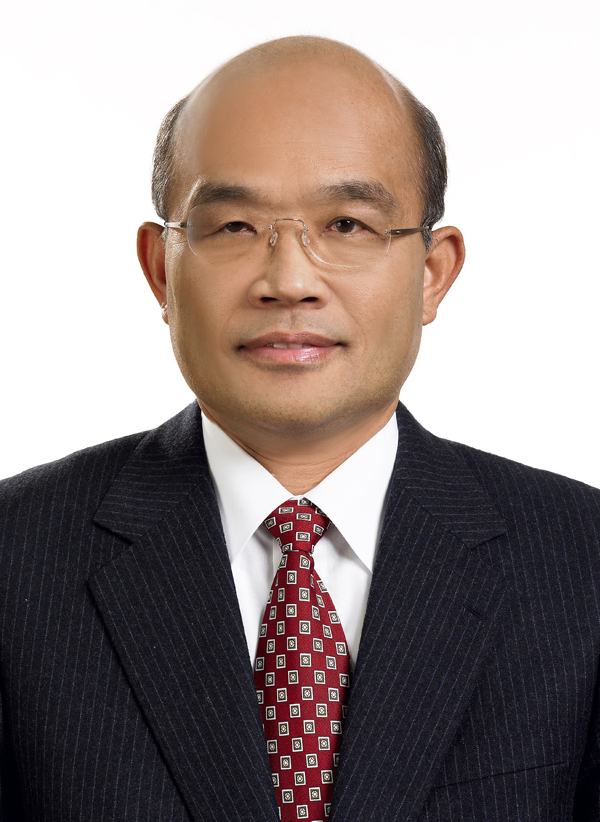
- Date formed: 25 January 2006
- Date dissolved: 21 May 2007

People and organisations
- Head of state: Chen Shui-bian
- Head of government: Su Tseng-chang
- Deputy head of government: Tsai Ing-wen
- Total no. of members: 10
- Member parties: Democratic Progressive Party (DPP)
- Status in legislature: DPP plurality, pan-green minority
- Opposition parties: Kuomintang
- Opposition leader: ?

History
- Election: 2004 Taiwanese legislative election
- Legislature term: Sixth Legislative Yuan
- Predecessor: Hsieh cabinet
- Successor: Chang cabinet

Su Tseng-chang was announced as the 41st premier of the Republic of China by President Chen Shui-bian on 19 January 2006 and took his oath of office, along with his cabinet, on 25 January 2006. Soon after, Su promised to step down if the people's welfare (referring to crime and other civil problems) did not improve within six months. Su faced calls for his resignation after the Rebar Chinese Bank run, but refused to leave his post at the time.

On 12 May 2007, Su submitted his letter of resignation to President Chen Shui-bian, ending his tenure on 21 May. With the resignation of Su and with ten months left in Chen's presidency, that would mean Chen's eight years as President will have seen at least six Premiers (with Chang Chun-Hsiung serving two separate tenures). Su also stated that he previously submitted resignations numerous times over his sixteen-month tenure, but all were rejected by President Chen.

== Cabinet members ==
Office	Incumbent	Tenure
Premier	Su Tseng-chang	2006–2007
Vice Premier	Tsai Ing-wen	2006–2007
Minister of the Interior	Lee I-yang	2006–2008
Minister of Foreign Affairs	James C. F. Huang	2006–2008
Minister of National Defense	Lee Jye	2006–2007
Minister of Finance	Joseph Lyu	2006–2006
Minister of Finance	Ho Chih-chin	2006–2008
Minister of Justice	Shih Mao-lin	2005–2008
Minister of Economic Affairs	Morgan Huang	2006–2006
Minister of Economic Affairs	Steve Chen	2006–2008
Minister of Transportation and Communications	Kuo Yao-chi	2006–2006
Minister of Transportation and Communications	Tsai Duei	2006–2008
Minister of Education	Tu Cheng-sheng	2006–2008
