= Lin Yi-fu =

Taiwanese politician (born 1942)

- 林義夫

Representative of the Separate Customs Territory of Taiwan, Penghu, Kinmen and Matsu to the World Trade Organization
- In office 17 May 2005 – September 2012
- Preceded by: Yen Ching-chang
- Succeeded by: Lai Shin-yuan

Minister without portfolio
- In office 20 May 2004 – 1 February 2005

Minister of Economic Affairs of the Republic of China
- In office 21 March 2002 – 19 May 2004
- Deputy: Yiin Chii-ming
- Preceded by: Christine Tsung
- Succeeded by: Ho Mei-yueh

Political Deputy Minister of Economic Affairs
- In office 2000–2002
- Minister: Lin Hsin-i; Christine Tsung

Administrative Deputy Minister of Economic Affairs
- In office 1997–2000
- Minister: Wang Chih-kang; Lin Hsin-i

Personal details
- Born: 15 November 1942 (age 83) Taihoku, Taihoku Prefecture, Taiwan, Empire of Japan
- Party: Kuomintang
- Education: National Chengchi University (BS)

Lin Yi-fu (Chinese: 林義夫; pinyin: Lín Yìfū; born 15 November 1942) is a Taiwanese politician. A member of the Kuomintang, he served as Minister of Economic Affairs in the presidential administration of Chen Shui-bian from 2002 to 2004.

== Education and early career ==
Lin was born in 1942 and earned a bachelor's degree in accounting and statistics from National Chengchi University in 1965. The next year, he began working for the Ministry of Economic Affairs and served as trade representative to Australia, the Philippines, Thailand, and Canada. In 1990, Lin was named deputy director-general of the Board of Foreign Trade. Lin assumed the leadership of the Board of Foreign Trade in 1995, serving two years until his appointment as administrative deputy minister of economic affairs. In 2000, Lin was promoted to the position of political deputy minister within the same ministry.

== Later career ==
Lin took office as Minister of Economic Affairs on 21 March 2002, after the resignation of Christine Tsung. Lin was succeeded by Ho Mei-yueh in Chen Shui-bian's second term, but accepted an offer to stay on in the Executive Yuan as minister without portfolio in May. As minister without portfolio, Lin was tasked with reviewing bills and projects related to finance and economics. Lin tendered his resignation from the cabinet in January 2005, and became Taiwan's representative to the World Trade Organization in May. After taking office, he repeatedly called for the government to increase its participation in WTO initiatives, and for the United States to sign a free trade agreement with Taiwan. During Lin's tenure as Taiwan's WTO representative, the Agency for International Trade Information and Co-operation granted Taiwan observer status for a two-year period, starting in 2007.

Lin later became a board member of various Taiwanese companies, including Nan Ya Plastics, Taishin Financial Holdings, and Swissray Global Healthcare.
