= Time in Taiwan =

National Standard Time
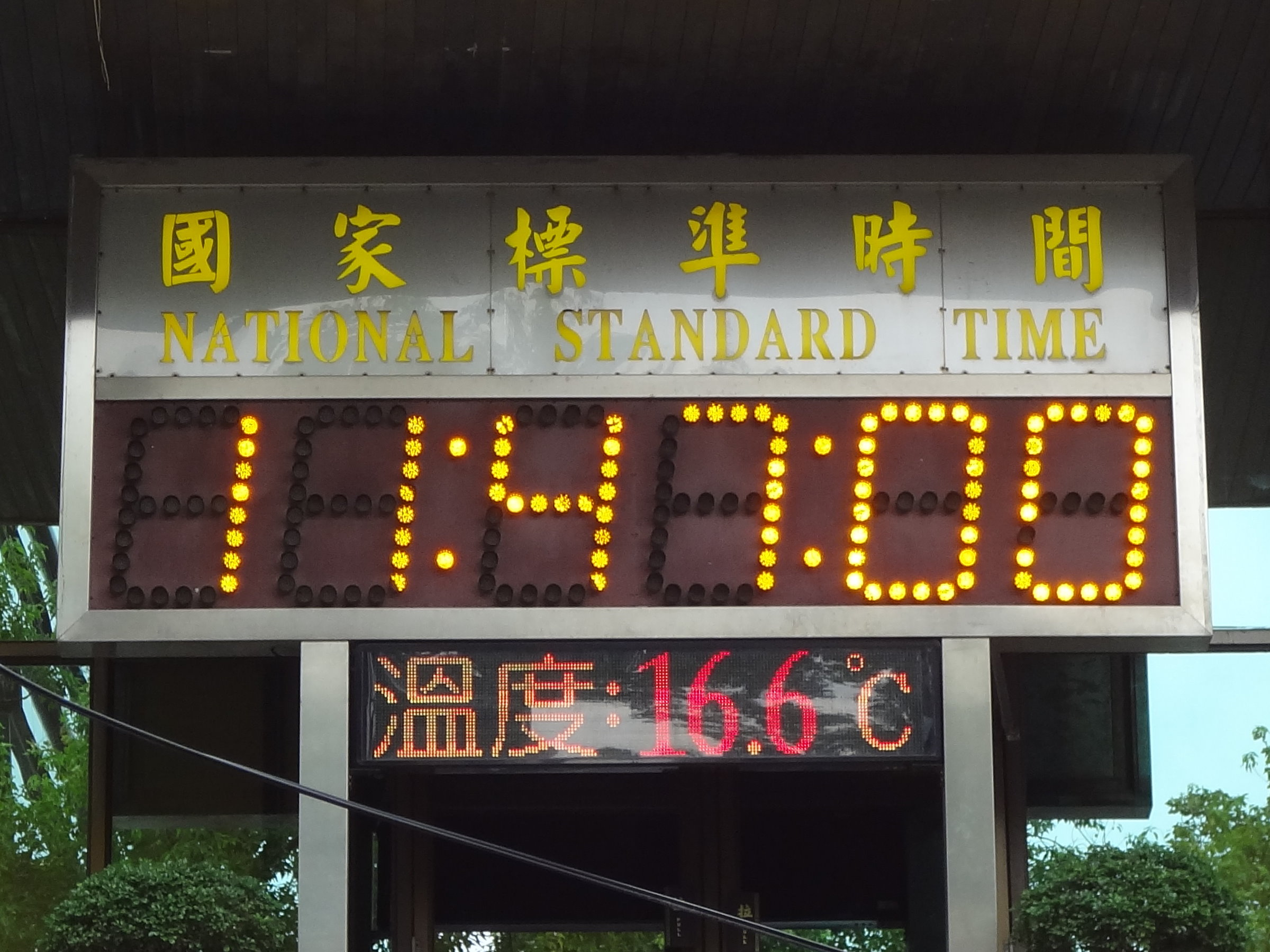
- National Standard Time digital clock of Bureau of Standards, Metrology and Inspection (BSMI), Taiwan
- Traditional Chinese: 國家標準時間
- Simplified Chinese: 国家标准时间
Transcriptions
Standard Mandarin
- Hanyu Pinyin: Guójiā Biāozhǔn Shíjiān
- Bopomofo: ㄍㄨㄛˊ ㄐㄧㄚ ㄅㄧㄠ ㄓㄨㄣˇ ㄕˊ ㄐㄧㄢ
- Gwoyeu Romatzyh: Gwojia Biaujuun Shyrjian
- Wade–Giles: Kuo²-chia¹ Piao¹-chun³ Shih²-chien¹
- Tongyong Pinyin: Guójia Biaojhǔn Shíhjian
- MPS2: Guójiā Biāujǔn Shŕjiān
- IPA: [kwǒtɕjá pjáʊʈʂwə̀n ʂɻ̩̌tɕjɛ́n]
Hakka
- Romanization: Koet-kâ Phêu-chún Sṳ̀-kiên
Yue: Cantonese
- Jyutping: Gwok^{3} Gaa^{1} Biu^{1} Zeon^{2} Si^{4} Gaan^{3}
Southern Min
- Hokkien POJ: Kok-ka Piau-chún Sî-kan
- Tâi-lô: Kok-ka Piau-tsún Sî-kan

National Standard Time (Note: In local languages: Traditional Chinese script: 國家標準時間; Mandarin Pinyin: Guójiā biāozhǔn shíjiān; Hokkien: Kok-ka piau-chún sî-kan) is the official time zone in Taiwan defined by an UTC offset of +08:00. This standard is also known as Taipei Time (臺北時間), Taiwan Time (臺灣時間) or Taiwan Standard Time (TST).

== History ==
History of time standard in Taiwan
Time offset	Name		Date	
Time offset	English	Official	Start	End
UTC+08:00	Western Standard Time	Japanese: 西部標準時, romanized: Seibu Hyōjunji	1896-01-01	1937-09-30
UTC+09:00	Central Standard Time	Japanese: 中央標準時, romanized: Chūō Hyōjunji	1937-10-01	1945-09-20
UTC+08:00	Western Standard Time	Japanese: 西部標準時, romanized: Seibu Hyōjunji	1945-09-21	1945-10-25
UTC+08:00	Chungyuan Standard Time	Chinese: 中原標準時間; pinyin: Zhōngyuán Biāozhǔn Shíjiān	1945-10-25	Early 2000s
UTC+08:00	National Standard Time	國家標準時間; Guójiā Biāozhǔn Shíjiān	2000s	

The first time zone standard in Taiwan was enforced on 1 January 1896, the second year of Taiwan under Japanese rule. The standard was called Western Standard Time (西部標準時) with time offset of UTC+08:00, based on 120°E longitude. On 1 October 1937, the Western Standard Time zone was abolished and the Central Standard Time (中央標準時), with time offset of UTC+09:00, was enforced in the entire country of Japan including Taiwan. This time was used until the end of the Second World War. On 21 September 1945, the Governor-General of Taiwan announced that the order issued in 1937 was revoked. Time Memorial Day was observed every 10 June from 1921 to 1941, which led to an increase in the observance of an official time.

After the war's end, Taiwan was annexed to the five time zones system of the Republic of China. It was classified in the "Chungyuan Standard Time" with a time offset of UTC+08:00. After the Chinese Civil War in 1949, the Government of the Republic of China retreated to Taiwan and lost nearly all the territory in mainland China. Since then, the five time zones system was no longer implemented except for the Chungyuan Standard Time in Taiwan. Because the term "Chungyuan" (Zhongyuan) refers to the Central Plain of China, the government gradually phased out the name in favor of "National Standard Time". However, some radio channels continued using "Chungyuan", most notably the Broadcasting Corporation of China until 2007. Other alternatives include "Taiwan Standard Time" (臺灣標準時間) and "Taipei Time" (臺北時間).

Daylight saving time was implemented in Taiwan after the Second World War on the summer of 1946–1961, 1974, 1975, 1979.

In October 2017, a petition took place to change the offset to UTC+09:00, which was responded by an assessment of potential impact by the government.

Standard time in Taiwan since 1896
Year	Date	Change of time	Notes	UTC offset after the Change
1896	January 1	—	Introduction of Western Standard Time	8:00
1937	October 1	+1:00	Introduction of Central Standard Time	9:00
1945	September 21	-1:00	Introduction of Western Standard Time	8:00
1945	October 25	0:00	Introduction of Chungyuan Standard Time	8:00
1946	May 15	+1:00	Start of summer time	9:00
1946	October 1	-1:00	End of summer time	8:00
1947	April 15	+1:00	Start of summer time	9:00
1947	November 1	-1:00	End of summer time	8:00
1948–1951	May 1	+1:00	Start of summer time	9:00
1948–1951	October 1	-1:00	End of summer time	8:00
1952	March 1	+1:00	Start of daylight saving time	9:00
1952	November 1	-1:00	End of daylight saving time	8:00
1953, 1954	April 1	+1:00	Start of daylight saving time	9:00
1953, 1954	November 1	-1:00	End of daylight saving time	8:00
1955–1959	April 1	+1:00	Start of daylight saving time	9:00
1955–1959	October 1	-1:00	End of daylight saving time	8:00
1960, 1961	June 1	+1:00	Start of summer time	9:00
1960, 1961	October 1	-1:00	End of summer time	8:00
1974, 1975	April 1	+1:00	Start of daylight saving time	9:00
1974, 1975	October 1	-1:00	End of daylight saving time	8:00
1979	July 1	+1:00	Start of daylight saving time	9:00
1979	October 1	-1:00	End of daylight saving time	8:00
Early 2000s		0:00	Introduction of National Standard Time	8:00

== Present development ==
National Standard Time is now managed by the Bureau of Standards, Metrology and Inspection (BSMI) under the Ministry of Economic Affairs. The time is released according to the caesium atomic clocks aggregated by National Standard Time and Frequency Laboratory under Chunghwa Telecom after consulting the data provided by International Bureau of Weights and Measures.

National Standard Time used in Taiwan is also the same as China, Hong Kong, Macau, Ulaanbaatar Mongolia, Philippines, Malaysia, Singapore, Western Australia, Brunei and Central Indonesia.

== IANA time zone database ==
The IANA time zone database contains one zone for Taiwan, named Asia/Taipei.

c.c.*	coordinates*	TZ*	comments*	Standard time	Summer time
TW	+2503+12130	Asia/Taipei		+08:00	—N/a
