= Taiwan Jade =

Mineral from Taiwan

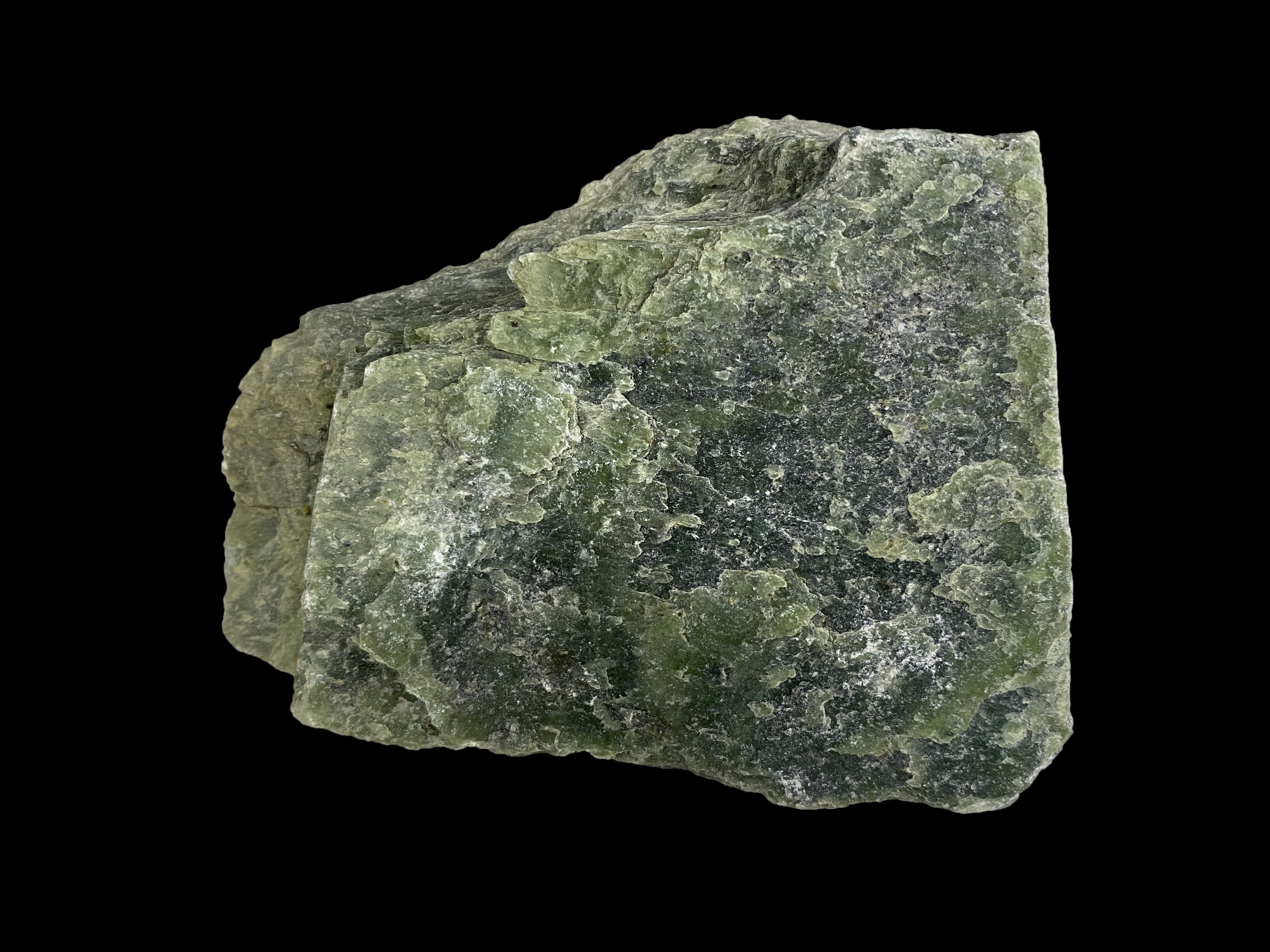

General
- Category: Silicate mineral
- Formula: Ca_{2}(Mg,Fe^{2+})_{5}(Si_{8}O_{22})(OH,F)_{2}
- Crystal system: Monoclinic

Identification
- Color: Light green – dark green
- Cleavage: None
- Fracture: Uneven
- Mohs scale hardness: 5.5–7.0
- Luster: Vitreous, Greasy
- Streak: White
- Diaphaneity: Translucent
- Specific gravity: 2.9–3.1
- Refractive index: 1.62

Taiwan Jade is a type of nephrite primarily composed of minerals such as tremolite and actinolite. It has a green color and is found in the Laonao Mountain area of Hualien County, Taiwan. It was first identified by Liao Hsueh-Cheng in 1956 and saw significant mining operations starting from 1965. However, its production has gradually declined since 1978 due to reduced output.

== Discovery ==
In 1932, while hunting in the Laonao Mountain area of Hualien, Taiwan, Japanese individuals discovered asbestos. Asbestos has excellent thermal insulation properties, and during World War II the Japanese extensively mined it in the mountains as a strategic resource. However, nephrite, which coexisted with asbestos at the time, was considered worthless waste rock and was dumped in piles in the valleys. In 1956, Liao Hsueh-Cheng, who was a Hong Kong student from the Mining and Metallurgy Department of Taiwan Provincial College of Engineering (now National Cheng Kung University), participated in a mining survey team in eastern Taiwan organized by the Youth Corps during the summer break. He picked up some of the waste rocks from the riverbed near Fengtian and brought them back to the laboratory to grind into thin slices for research. It was then that these waste rocks were identified as "Taiwan Jade." In 1965, Dr. Davies, the head of the Department of Geography at the University of Hong Kong, accompanied by Tan Li-Ping, who was working at the Provincial Geological Survey of Taiwan at the time, went to survey the area around the mines in Fengtian. They confirmed the abundant jade deposits in the area, triggering a craze for jade mining.

== Name ==
Taiwan Jade, also known as Fengtian Jade, Taiwan Nephrite, or Taiwan Green Jade, or Taiwan Soft Jade, reached peak production during the 1960s and 1970s. During this time, Taiwan became the world's leading exporter of processed nephrite. Therefore, the green nephrite produced in Taiwan gained worldwide renown under the name "Taiwan Jade." Many countries around the world produce nephrite, including China, the United States, Canada, Russia, Poland, Australia, New Zealand, and South Korea.

== Mineral composition ==
Taiwan Jade is primarily composed of minerals belonging to the amphibole group, specifically tremolite (Ca_{2}Mg_{5}Si_{8}O_{22}(OH)_{2}) with magnesium content or actinolite (Ca_{2}Fe_{5}Si_{8}O_{22}(OH)_{2}) with iron content. It exhibits a range of colors from light green to dark green. When it contains a higher amount of magnesium, the color tends to be lighter, while a higher iron content results in a darker color. One prominent feature of Taiwan Jade is the presence of chromite, which is iron-black in color. It can also occur in association with minerals such as asbestos, talc, chalcopyrite, picotite, and grossular.

== Classification ==
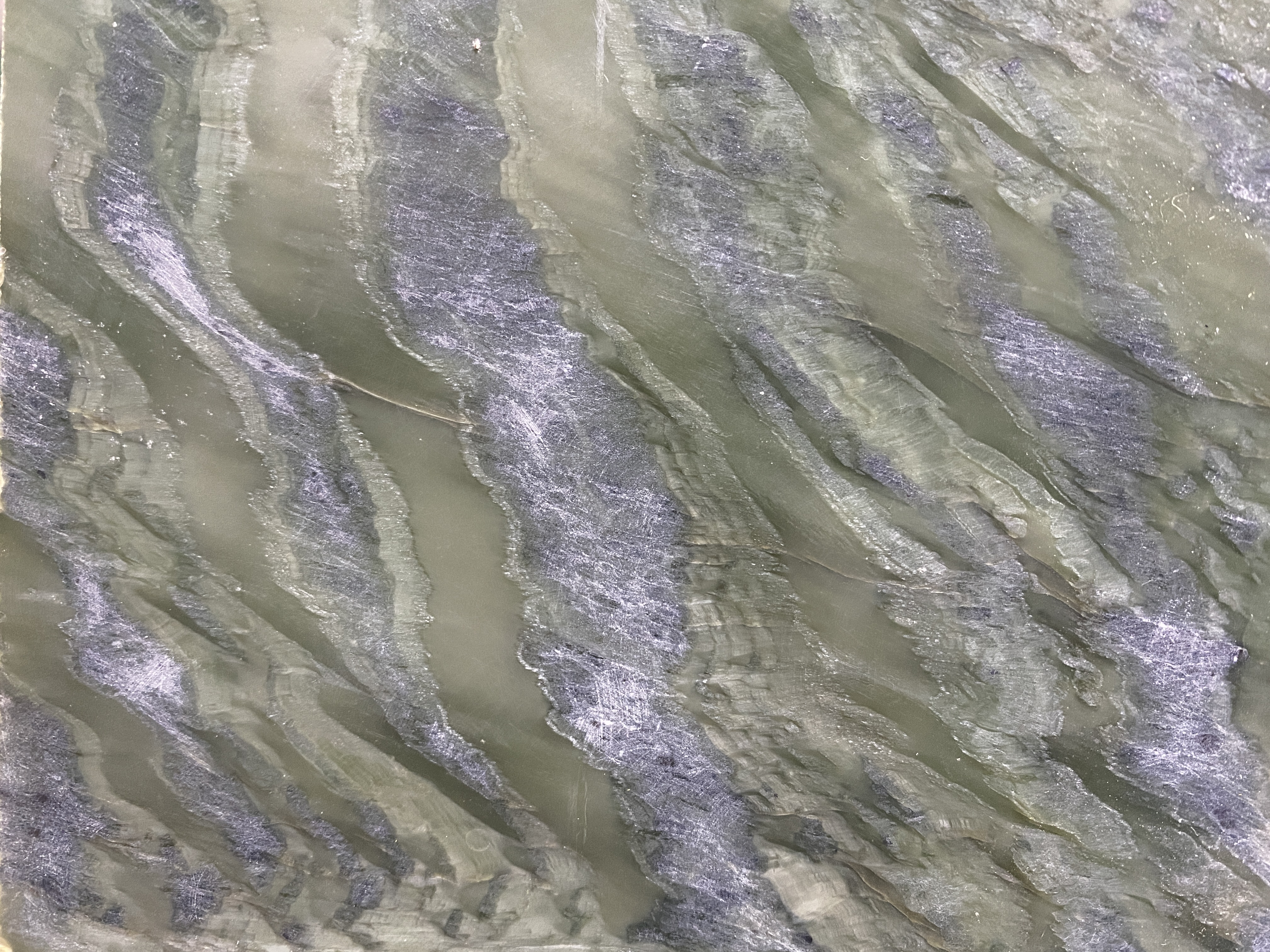
Dragon Vein Jade

According to the paper A Mineralogical Study of the Fengtien Nephrite Deposits Of Hualien, Taiwan published by Professor Tan Li-Ping and others from the Department of Geosciences at National Taiwan University in 1978, Taiwan Jade can be classified into three main types:

1. Common Nephrite: Also known as Common Jade, this is the most commonly encountered type of nephrite. It is translucent with a glassy luster, and the crystal grain sizes of its constituent minerals range from 40 to 150 micrometers.
2. Cat's Eye Nephrite: Also known as Cat's Eye Jade or Taiwan Cat's Eye, this type of nephrite exhibits the cat's eye effect. It is sometimes referred to as Cat's Eye Stone in the market. The crystal grain sizes of Cat's Eye Nephrite can sometimes exceed 1000 micrometers.
3. Waxy Nephrite: This type of nephrite exhibits a waxy luster and ranges from opaque to translucent due to diffuse reflection. Its crystal grain sizes are usually smaller than 15 micrometers.

Additionally, there is a special type of nephrite called Dragon Vein Jade, which is a combination of the three aforementioned types. It displays alternating bands of dark green and light green between Common Nephrite and Waxy Nephrite, and at the boundaries between the two, thin layers of Cat's Eye Nephrite can be observed.

== Geological Formation ==
Taiwan is located on the subduction zone between the Philippine Sea Plate and the Eurasian Plate. The East Rift Valley, located in the Hualien-Taitung area, serves as the suture zone where the two plates collide. Within this suture zone and its vicinity, various geological processes occur, including metamorphism, pyrogenesis, and hydrothermal alteration. In the deep crust, minerals such as olivine and pyroxene in ultramafic rocks or peridotites interact with water from the surrounding layers, leading to the formation of serpentine group minerals through a process called serpentinization. During the uplift associated with plate collision, high temperatures and dehydration processes occur, resulting in the metamorphic transformation of serpentinite into nephrite.

== Production and Distribution ==
The production area of Taiwan Jade is located in the Laonao Mountain area of Fengtian, Hualien County. The geological formation in this area is the oldest in Taiwan, called the Tananao Schist, dating back to the Permian of the Paleozoic Era to Mesozoic Era. Taiwan Jade is mainly produced in the contact zone between serpentinite and schist, where it undergoes metasomatism. Based on zircon dating, Taiwan Jade is estimated to have formed approximately 3.3±1.7 million years ago, making it the youngest jade in the world. In the stratum, Taiwan Jade is found in irregular thin or lens-like veins, with a thickness ranging from 0.1 to 0.5 meters. Its width can reach up to 1.5–2.0 meters in some areas, with a length of 20–30 meters. According to the Report of the Exploration And Development Of Taiwan Nephrite Deposits Project, the estimated total reserve of Taiwan Jade is around 611,100 metric tons, and considering a 60% extraction rate, the exploitable quantity is estimated to be around 366,660 metric tons.

== Mining ==
The 1960s and 1970s were the heyday of Taiwan Jade mining and processing. Annual average extraction exceeded 1,500 metric tons, with over 800 processing factories throughout Taiwan and more than 50,000 people employed in the jade industry. Taiwan's production accounted for approximately 80% of the global jade output during that time. The annual sales revenue was around 5 billion New Taiwan dollars, establishing Taiwan as a leading country in jewelry processing and jade export.

However, in the 1980s, the jade market contracted, resulting in a significant decrease in prices. Additionally, the influx of Canadian jade imports further contributed to the decline. As a result, Taiwan Jade mines gradually ceased operations.

== See also ==
- Lingling-o
- Maritime Silk Road
