= Hu Sheng-cheng =

Taiwanese economist and game theorist (1940–2018)

- 胡勝正
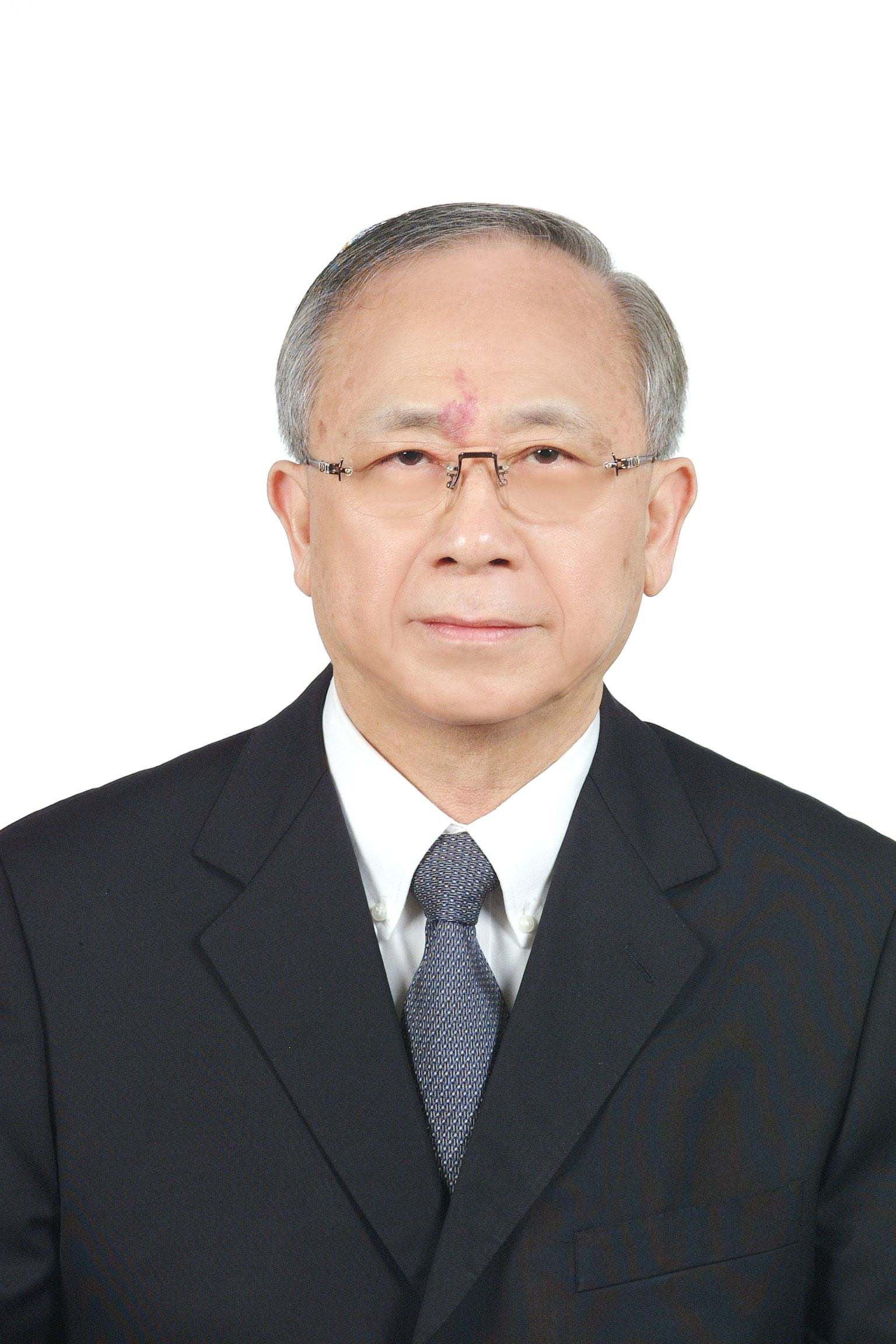

Chairperson of Financial Supervisory Commission
- In office 25 January 2007 – 1 July 2008
- Preceded by: Shih Jun-ji; Susan Chang (acting)
- Succeeded by: Gordon Chen

Minister of the Council for Economic Planning and Development
- In office 20 May 2004 – 21 May 2007
- Preceded by: Lin Hsin-i
- Succeeded by: Ho Mei-yueh

Personal details
- Born: 5 August 1940 Taihoku Prefecture, Japanese Taiwan (today Yilan County, Taiwan
- Died: 10 July 2018 (aged 77) Zhongzheng, Taipei, Taiwan
- Education: National Taiwan University (BA); University of Rochester (MA, PhD)

Hu Sheng-cheng (Chinese: 胡勝正; pinyin: Hú Shèngzhèng; 5 August 1940 – 10 July 2018) was a Taiwanese economist and game theorist. He led the Council for Economic Planning and Development from 2004 to 2007 and the Financial Supervisory Commission from 2007 to 2008.

== Early life and education ==
Hu was born in Yilan County on August 5, 1940, during the Japanese rule of Taiwan. After graduating from National Yilan Senior High School, he studied economics at National Taiwan University and graduated with a bachelor's degree in 1962. He then completed military service in the Republic of China Armed Forces and pursued graduate studies in the United States at the University of Rochester, where he earned a master's degree in economics in 1967 and his Ph.D. in economics in 1970 specializing in game theory. His doctoral dissertation was titled, "Technical progress and optimal growth."

== Academic career ==
Hu remained in the United States, and began a teaching career at Purdue University in 1968. While working in the U.S., Hu authored a pair of reports to the Social Security Administration. Hu returned to Taiwan in 1996, teaching at NTU and holding a concurrent appointment at the Academia Sinica until 2001.

== Political career ==
Hu was appointed a minister without portfolio by premier Chang Chun-hsiung in 2001 and had oversight of financial policies. Hu was retained by Chang's successor Yu Shyi-kun when Yu took office in February 2002. Later that year, Yu initiated a six-year development plan devoted to promotion of environmentally friendly industries. He placed Hu in charge of research and development, high value-added industry, and the establishment of an operation center. Upon the resignation of finance minister Lee Yung-san in November, Hu was considered a potential successor. In 2004, he was named the head of the Council for Economic Planning and Development, in addition to his duties as minister without portfolio. After the resignation of Shih Jun-ji in January 2007, Hu was selected to chair the Financial Supervisory Commission. He stepped down in July 2008, and was replaced by Gordon Chen.

Hu later returned to the Academia Sinica as a research fellow. He was an adviser to Wellington Koo's 2014 Taipei mayoral campaign. In August 2016, Hu assumed the chairmanship of the Chung-Hua Institution for Economic Research. He fell ill that same year, and died of pulmonary calcification at National Taiwan University Hospital on 10 July 2018, aged 77.
