= Kong Jaw-sheng =

Taiwanese banker (1955–2016)

- 龔照勝

Chairperson of Financial Supervisory Commission of the Republic of China
- In office 1 July 2004 – 12 May 2006
- Preceded by: Office created
- Succeeded by: Lu Daung-yen (acting); Shih Jun-ji

Personal details
- Born: 29 March 1955 Guanshan, Taitung County, Taiwan
- Died: 18 March 2016 (aged 60) Taipei, Taiwan
- Education: National Chiao Tung University (BS); Indiana University Bloomington (MBA)

Kong Jaw-sheng (Chinese: 龔照勝; pinyin: Gōng Zhàoshèng; 29 March 1955 – 18 March 2016) was a Taiwanese banker. He served as the first chairman of the Financial Supervisory Commission from 2004 to 2006. He was born in Guanshan, Taitung.

== Career ==
Kong worked for the Development Bank of Singapore from 1983 to 1987. In 1991, he joined UBS Taiwan, before leaving in 1995 to found the Taiwan branch of the Lehman Brothers. He then led the Taiwan sector of Donaldson Lufkin & Jenrette starting in 1999, which was acquired by Credit Suisse First Boston. Kong left CSFB in 2002, becoming a member of the board for both the Taiwan Tobacco and Liquor Corporation and the Taiwan Stock Exchange Corporation in 2003. He assumed the chairmanship of the Taiwan Sugar Corporation that same year. In June 2004, Chen Shui-bian named Kong the first leader of the Financial Supervisory Commission. At the time of his appointment, Taiwan had roughly 50 banks and over 300 credit cooperatives. Under Kong's leadership the FSC was expected to merge or close the least profitable financial institutions, despite opposition from banks, the Legislative Yuan, and labor unions. During Kong's tenure, limitations on Chinese banks were eased, allowing them to open branches in Taiwan for the first time. He supported the removal of the restriction that barred locally traded stocks from fluctuating in value by more than seven percent daily.

On 12 May 2006, Kong was suspended from his post as prosecutors investigated three separate corruption claims dating from his tenure at Taiwan Sugar. He was released on NT$500,000 bail shortly after questioning later that week, and filed an unsuccessful appeal to the Executive Yuan to regain his job. Kong was charged with violating government purchase rules in August. He rejected demands for his resignation, which were amplified after a subordinate, Lee Chin-chen, resigned as a result of involvement in a separate scandal. The Taipei District Court eventually acquitted Kong of corruption, and the ruling was upheld by the Taiwan High Court in March 2009.

He died of a heart attack at the age of 60 in 2016.
