= Lin Ling-san =

Taiwanese politician (1944–2022)

- 林陵三
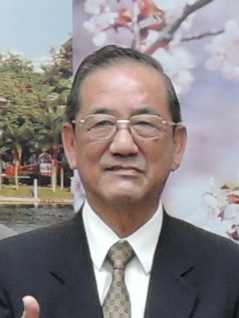

Minister of Transportation and Communications of the Republic of China
- In office 1 February 2002 – 25 January 2006
- Preceded by: Yeh Chu-lan
- Succeeded by: Kuo Yao-chi

Personal details
- Born: 16 April 1944 Takao, Taiwan, Empire of Japan
- Died: 26 November 2022 (aged 78)
- Party: Democratic Progressive Party (2002–2022)
- Education: Feng Chia University (BS); Northrop University (MS); National Chengchi University (MPA)

Lin Ling-san (Chinese: 林陵三; pinyin: Lín Língsān; 16 April 1944 – 26 November 2022) was a Taiwanese politician. He served as Minister of Transportation and Communications from 2002 to 2006. In 2009 the Control Yuan voted to impeach Lin for illegally investing in the Taiwan High Speed Rail Corp. The China Post reported that, "Because Lin [was] no longer a government official, the impeachment [would] not have any direct consequences for him, but the ruling [could] serve as a warning to incumbent officials dealing with the high-speed railway."

== Education ==
Lin graduated from Feng Chia University with a bachelor's degree in hydraulic engineering in 1968, then earned a master's degree in management science from Northrop University in the United States in 1986. He then earned a Master of Public Administration (M.P.A.) from National Chengchi University in 1988.
