= Shih Jun-ji =

Taiwanese politician (born 1955)

- 施俊吉
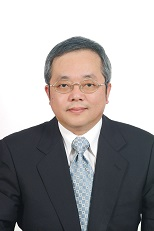
- Official portrait, 2016

36th Vice Premier of the Republic of China
- In office 8 September 2017 – 14 January 2019
- Prime Minister: William Lai
- Preceded by: Lin Hsi-yao
- Succeeded by: Chen Chi-mai

Minister without Portfolio
- In office 20 May 2016 – 30 June 2016
- Prime Minister: Lin Chuan
- Preceded by: Lin Junq-tzer
- Succeeded by: John Deng

23rd Chairman of the Provincial Government (Note: Titled as chairman of the Taiwan Provincial Government; as a governor that was appointed by the Executive Yuan.)
- In office 20 May 2016 – 30 June 2016
- Appointed by: Executive Yuan
- Prime Minister: Lin Chuan
- Preceded by: Lin Junq-tzer
- Succeeded by: Hsu Jan-yau

2nd Chairman of the Financial Supervisory Commission
- In office August 2006 – 12 January 2007
- Preceded by: Kong Jaw-sheng; Lu Daung-yen (acting)
- Succeeded by: Hu Sheng-cheng

Chairman of the Taiwan Asset Management Corporation
- Incumbent
- Assumed office 20 May 2020
- President: Guo Wen-jin
- Preceded by: Lin Mei-chu (Note: Guo Wen-jon served as the acting chairman before Shih assumes office.)

Personal details
- Born: 10 August 1955 (age 71) Changhua County, Taiwan
- Party: Independent
- Education: Fu Jen Catholic University (BA); Soochow University (MA); National Taiwan University (PhD)

Shih Jun-ji (Chinese: 施俊吉; pinyin: Shī Jùnjí; born 10 August 1955) is a Taiwanese economist and politician. He served as the second chairman of the Financial Supervisory Commission from 2006 to 2007 after Kong Jaw-sheng was removed from office. Shih served concurrently as Governor of Taiwan Province and minister without portfolio in 2016. Later that year, he was named chair of the Taiwan Stock Exchange. In 2017, he took office as Vice Premier of Taiwan under the Lai cabinet. Chen Chi-mai succeeded Shih as vice premier in 2019.

== Education ==
Shih graduated from Fu Jen Catholic University with a bachelor's degree in business administration in 1978. He then earned a master's degree in economics from Soochow University in 1980 and earned his Ph.D. in economics from National Taiwan University in 1984 under economists Mai Chao-cheng and Chen Zhaonan (陳昭南). His doctoral dissertation was titled, "Information and Economic Decision-Making" (Chinese: 訊息與經濟決策). As a college student, he led a demonstration which protested the White Terror, a period of political suppression that began after the 228 Incident of 1947.

== Career ==
After graduation, Shih did research with the Academia Sinica, then joined the Fair Trade Commission from 1998 to 2001.

He was appointed to the Financial Supervisory Commission in July 2006, and named FSC chairman in August of that year. During Shih's tenure as FSC chairman, the Rebar Chinese Bank filed for bankruptcy protection, which caused a bank run that led to NT$19 billion in losses and eventual government takeover of the financial institution. The Enterprise Bank of Hualien, independent of Rebar, was also declared insolvent and placed under the purview of the FSC. Shih resigned on 12 January 2007, shortly after the takeover announcement, to take responsibility for the Rebar scandal and was succeeded by Susan Chang on an interim basis, before Hu Sheng-cheng took office.

Shih returned to the Academia Sinica's Institute of Social Science after resigning the FSC chairmanship. He was named the economic adviser to Tsai Ing-wen's 2016 presidential campaign. Shortly before she won the election, the U.S.–China Economic and Security Review Commission reported that Shih could be chosen as a financial adviser in Tsai's administration. Tsai's premier Lin Chuan selected Shih as a minister without portfolio in April 2016. Shih was in charge of economic and communications policies, and led trade negotiations. He was named chairman of the Taiwan Stock Exchange in June 2016 and assumed the position on July 1.

Shih succeeded Lin Hsi-yao as vice premier of the Republic of China in September 2017. He was appointed to the office by William Lai, who replaced Lin Chuan as premier. Shih stepped down from the vice premiership when the Lai cabinet resigned, and was replaced by Chen Chi-mai. Shih became an adviser to the National Security Council. On 20 May 2020, Shih was named chairman of the Taiwan Asset Management Corporation, a position that had remained vacant after the December 2018 resignation of Lin Mei-chu.
