= Bureau of Standards, Metrology and Inspection =

Government agency of Taiwan

- 經濟部標準檢驗局

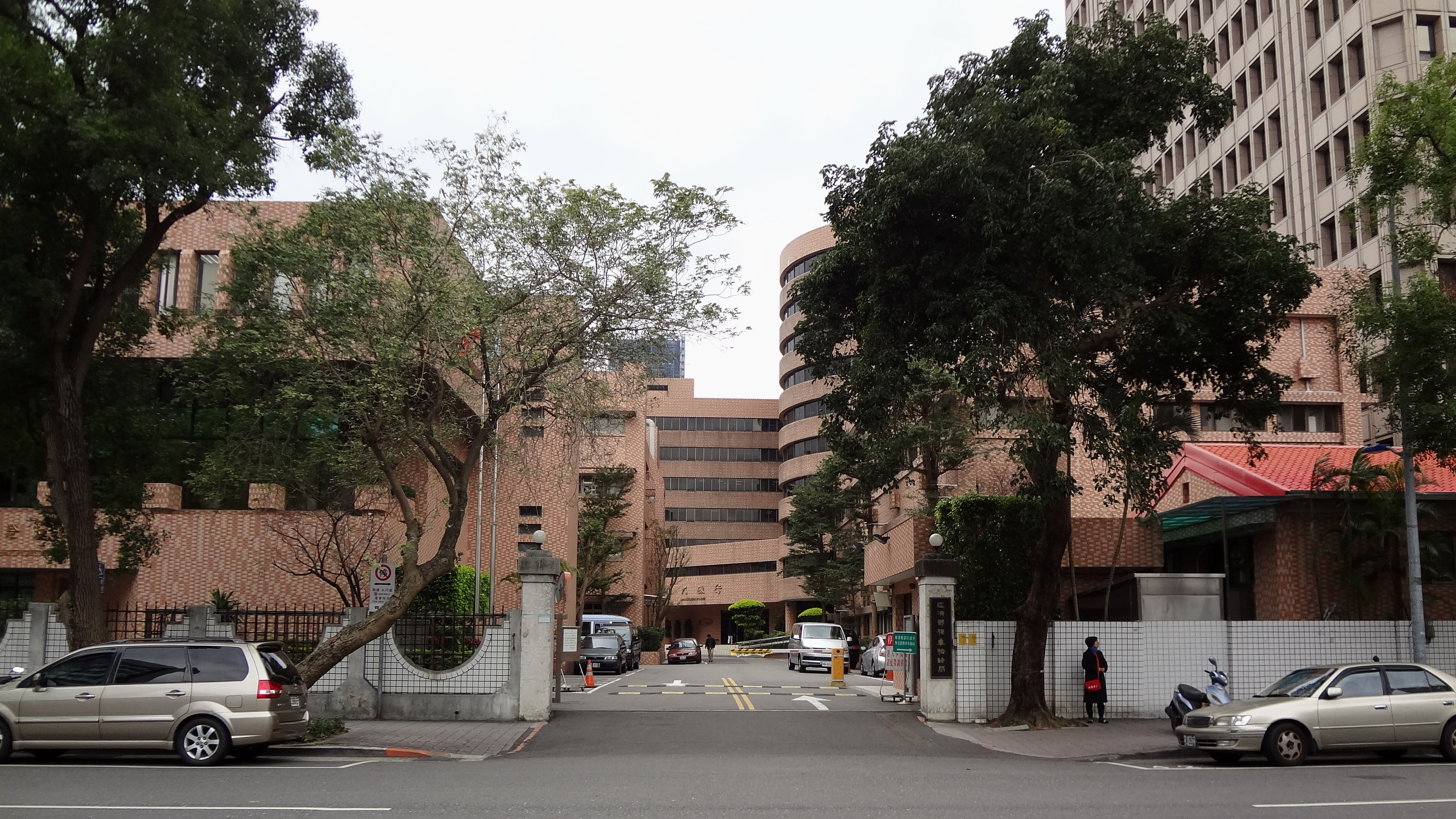

Agency overview
- Jurisdiction: Taiwan (ROC)
- Headquarters: Zhongzheng, Taipei; 25.033762°N 121.535361°E
- Parent agency: Ministry of Economic Affairs
- Website: Official website

The Bureau of Standards, Metrology and Inspection (BSMI; traditional Chinese: 經濟部標準檢驗局; simplified Chinese: 经济部标准检验局; pinyin: Jīngjìbù Biāozhǔn Jiǎnyànjú) is the administrative agency of the Ministry of Economic Affairs responsible for standardization, metrology and product inspection in Taiwan.

== Branch offices ==
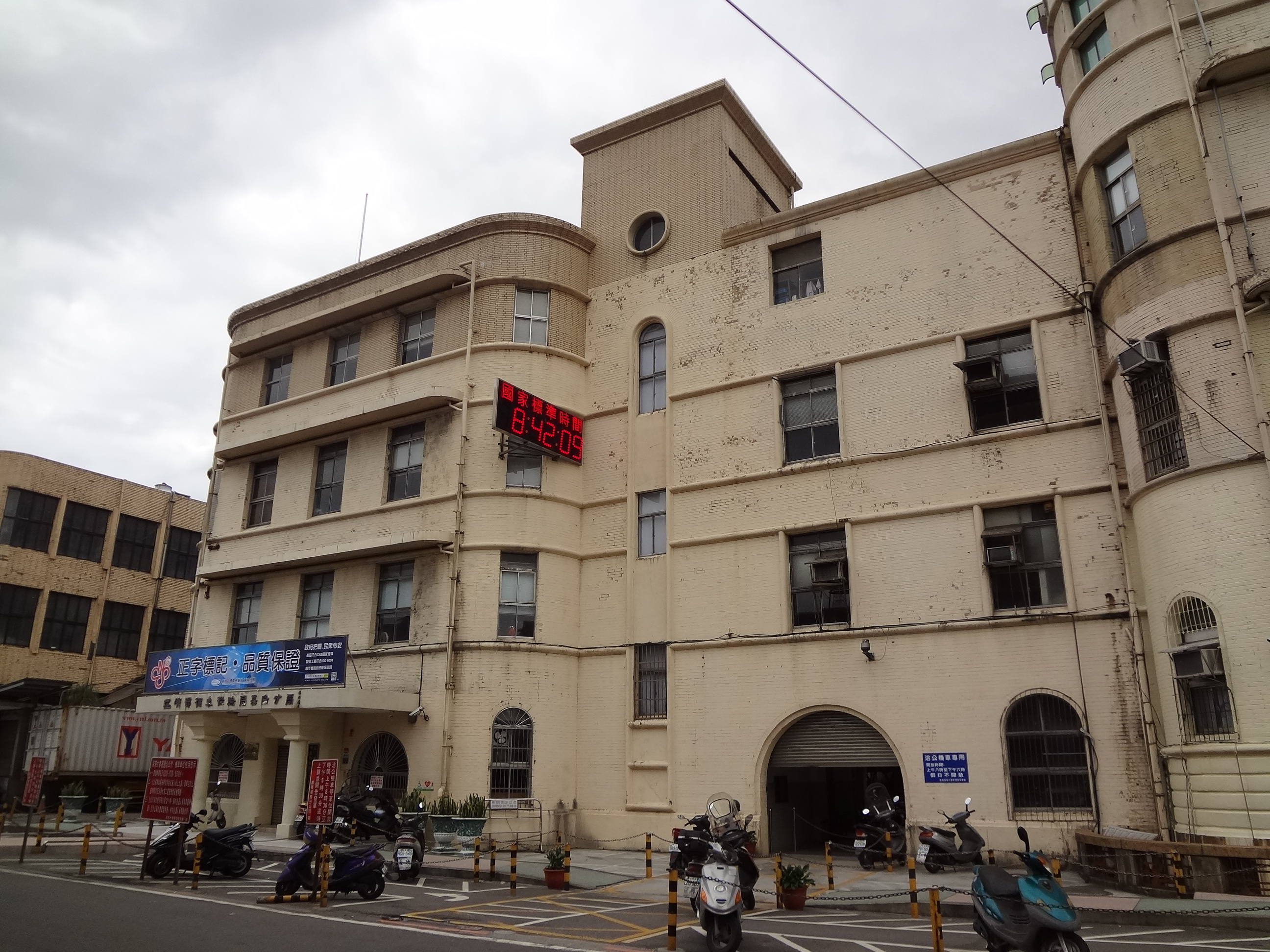
BSMI Keelung branch

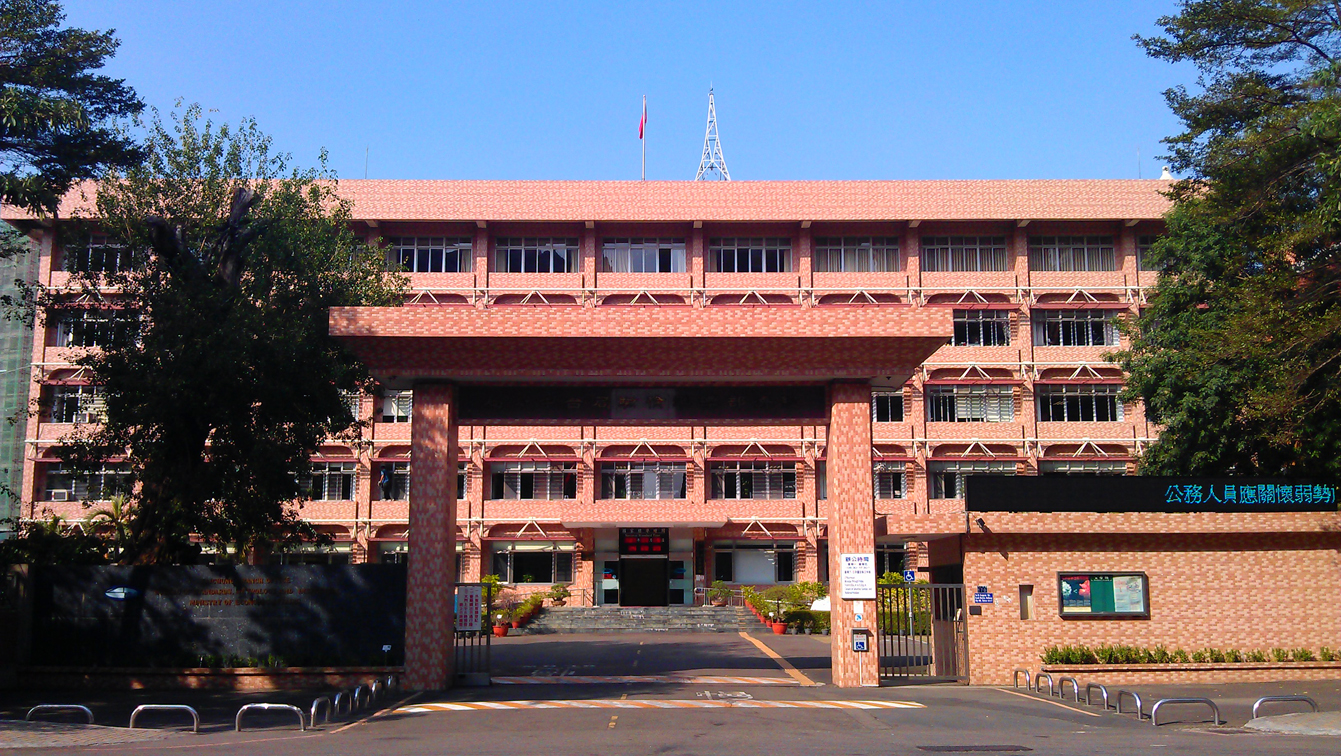
BSMI Taichung branch

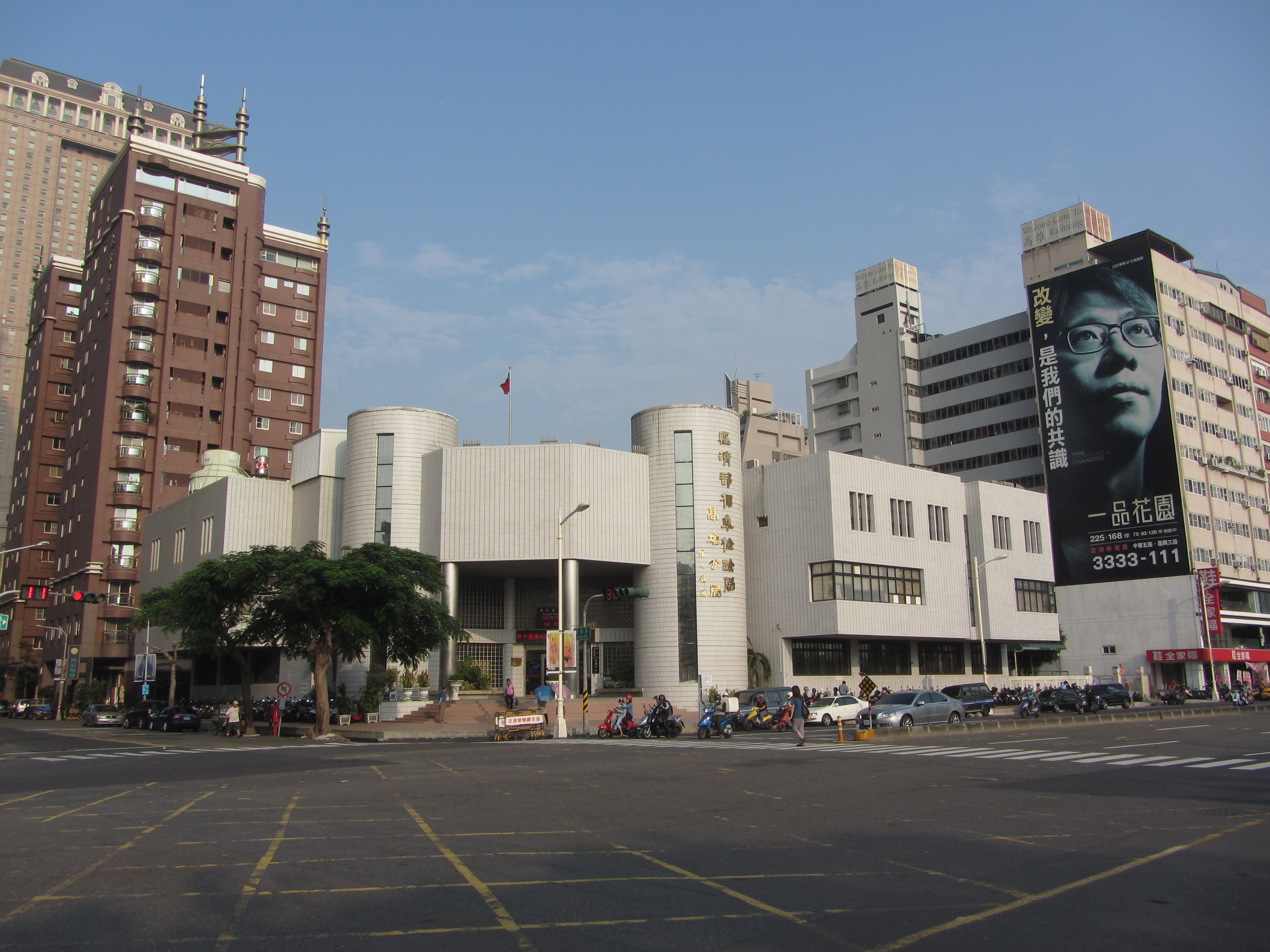
BSMI Kaohsiung branch

- Keelung Branch
- Hsinchu Branch
- Taichung Branch
- Tainan Branch
- Kaohsiung Branch
- Hualien Branch

== Institutions ==
- National Standards Review Council
- Information and Communication National Standard Promotion Committee
- National Standards Technology Committees
- Electronic Information Exchange Committee

== Transportation ==
The BSMI headquarter office is accessible within walking distance North East from National Taiwan University Hospital Station of Taipei Metro.

== See also ==
- Ministry of Economic Affairs (Taiwan)
