= Christine Tsung =

Taiwanese business executive and politician

Tsung Tsai-yi
- 宗才怡
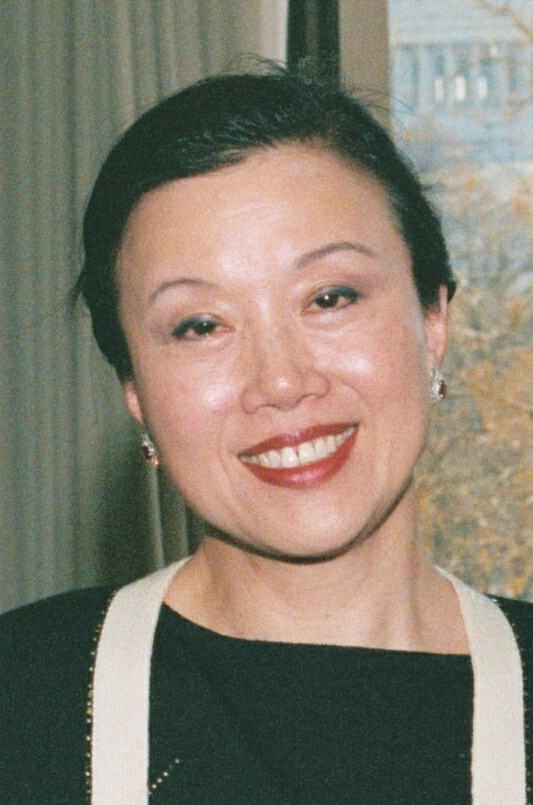
- Tsung in 2001

20th Minister of Economic Affairs
- In office 1 February 2002 – 20 March 2002
- Prime Minister: Yu Shyi-kun
- Deputy: Yiin Chii-ming
- Preceded by: Lin Hsin-i
- Succeeded by: Lin Yi-fu

Personal details
- Born: 1948 (age 77–78) Nanjing, Republic of China
- Party: Democratic Progressive Party
- Education: National Taiwan University (BA); Washington University in St. Louis (MA); University of Missouri (MBA)

Tsung Tsai-yi (Chinese: 宗才怡; born 1948), also known by her English name Christine Tsung, is a Taiwanese business executive who served as Minister of Economic Affairs in 2002 and was the president of China Airlines.

== Education ==
Tsung graduated from National Taiwan University with a bachelor's degree in business administration. She then completed graduate studies in the United States, where she studied quantitative analysis at Washington University in St. Louis, receiving an advanced degree there, and earned a Master of Business Administration (M.B.A.) from the University of Missouri.

== Career ==
Tsung joined China Airlines in 2000 as president of the company. In December 2001, China Airlines and Delta Air Lines signed a marketing agreement. Yu Shyi-kun offered her a position as Minister of Economic Affairs in January 2002, which Tsung initially turned down. She succeeded Lin Hsin-i as the first female economics minister in Taiwanese history on 1 February 2002, only to resign on 20 March. During her short tenure as head of the economics ministry, Tsung was widely ridiculed during interpellation sessions.

Shortly after leaving the Executive Yuan, Tsung became chairwoman of the Grand Hotel in Taipei. She was replaced by Chang Shuo-lao in 2008.

== Personal life ==
Tsung is married to banker Jerome Chen.
