= Lin Hsin-i =

Taiwanese businessman and politician

- 林信義
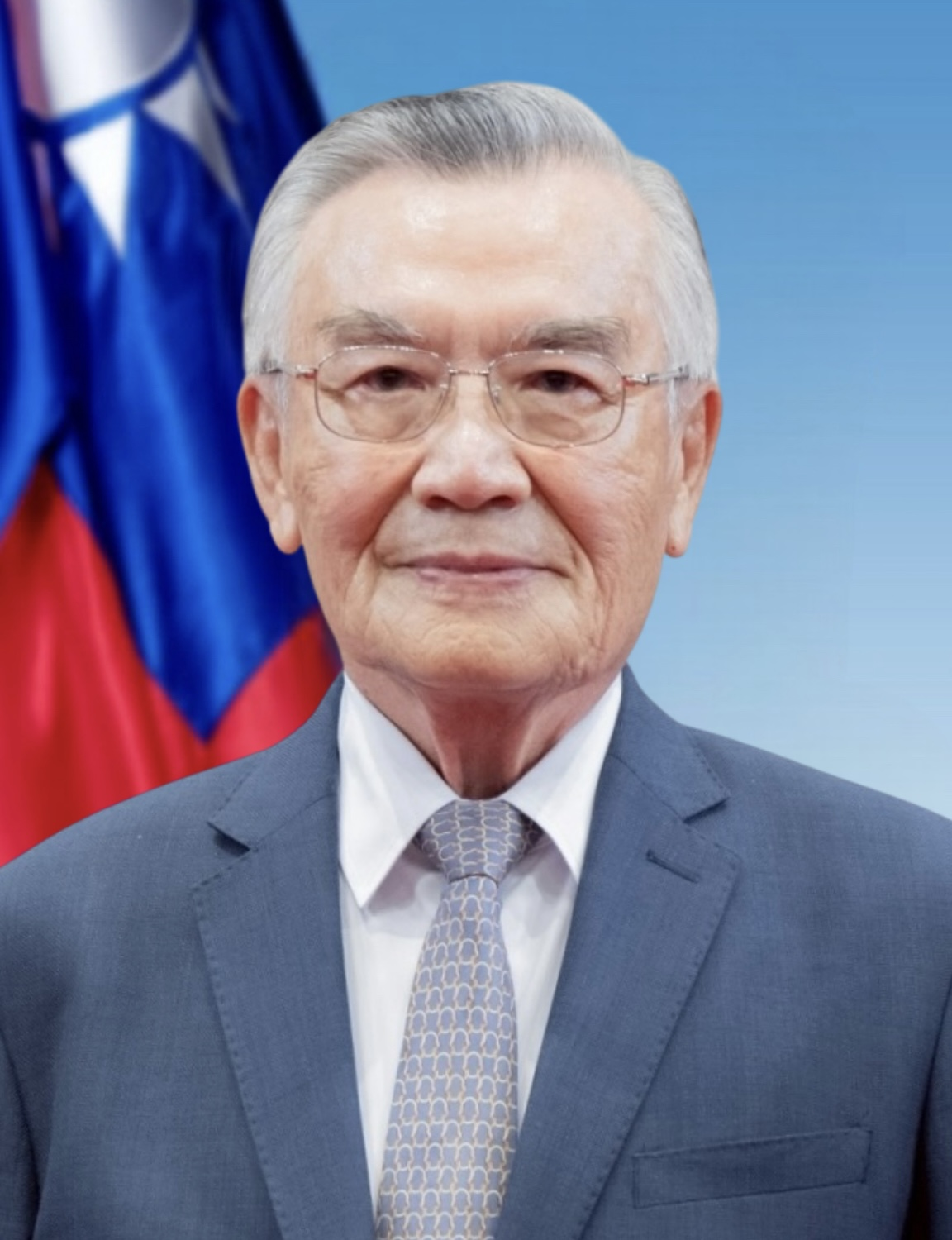
- Lin in 2025

Senior Advisor to the President
- Incumbent
- Assumed office 9 November 2016
- President: Tsai Ing-wen; Lai Ching-te
- In office 20 May 2004 – 20 May 2008
- President: Chen Shui-bian

23rd Vice Premier of Taiwan
- In office 1 February 2002 – 20 May 2004
- Prime Minister: Yu Shyi-kun
- Preceded by: Lai In-Jaw
- Succeeded by: Yeh Chu-lan

9th Minister of Economic Planning and Development
- In office 1 February 2002 – 20 May 2004
- Prime Minister: Yu Shyi-kun
- Preceded by: Chen Po-chih
- Succeeded by: Hu Sheng-cheng

22nd Minister of Economic Affairs
- In office 20 May 2000 – 1 February 2002
- Prime Minister: Tang Fei; Chang Chun-hsiung
- Preceded by: Wang Chih-kang
- Succeeded by: Christine Tsung

Personal details
- Born: 2 December 1946 (age 79) Tainan, Taiwan
- Party: Independent
- Education: National Cheng Kung University (BS); Oklahoma City University
- Occupation: Businessman

Lin Hsin-i (Chinese: 林信義; pinyin: Lín Xìnyì; born 2 December 1946) is a Taiwanese businessman and politician. He served in the Democratic Progressive Party administration as Minister of Economic Affairs between 2000 and 2002, then as Vice Premier between 2002 and 2004.

In November 2005, while a Senior Presidential Adviser, Lin attended the Asia Pacific Economic Cooperation (APEC) forum in Busan, South Korea, in place of Taiwan's President Chen Shui-bian. Because of opposition from the People's Republic of China, Taiwan's senior leaders are unable to attend APEC events in person and must send a ministerial-level envoy. He was Chairman of the Industrial Technology Research Institute from 2004 to 2008.

Lin graduated from National Cheng Kung University with a Bachelor of Science (B.S.) in mechanical engineering in 1970. Before entering politics, he was an executive in the car industry.

== See also ==
- List of vice premiers of the Republic of China
