= Morgan Hwang =

Taiwanese business executive and politician (born 1941)

Huang Ing-san
- 黃營杉
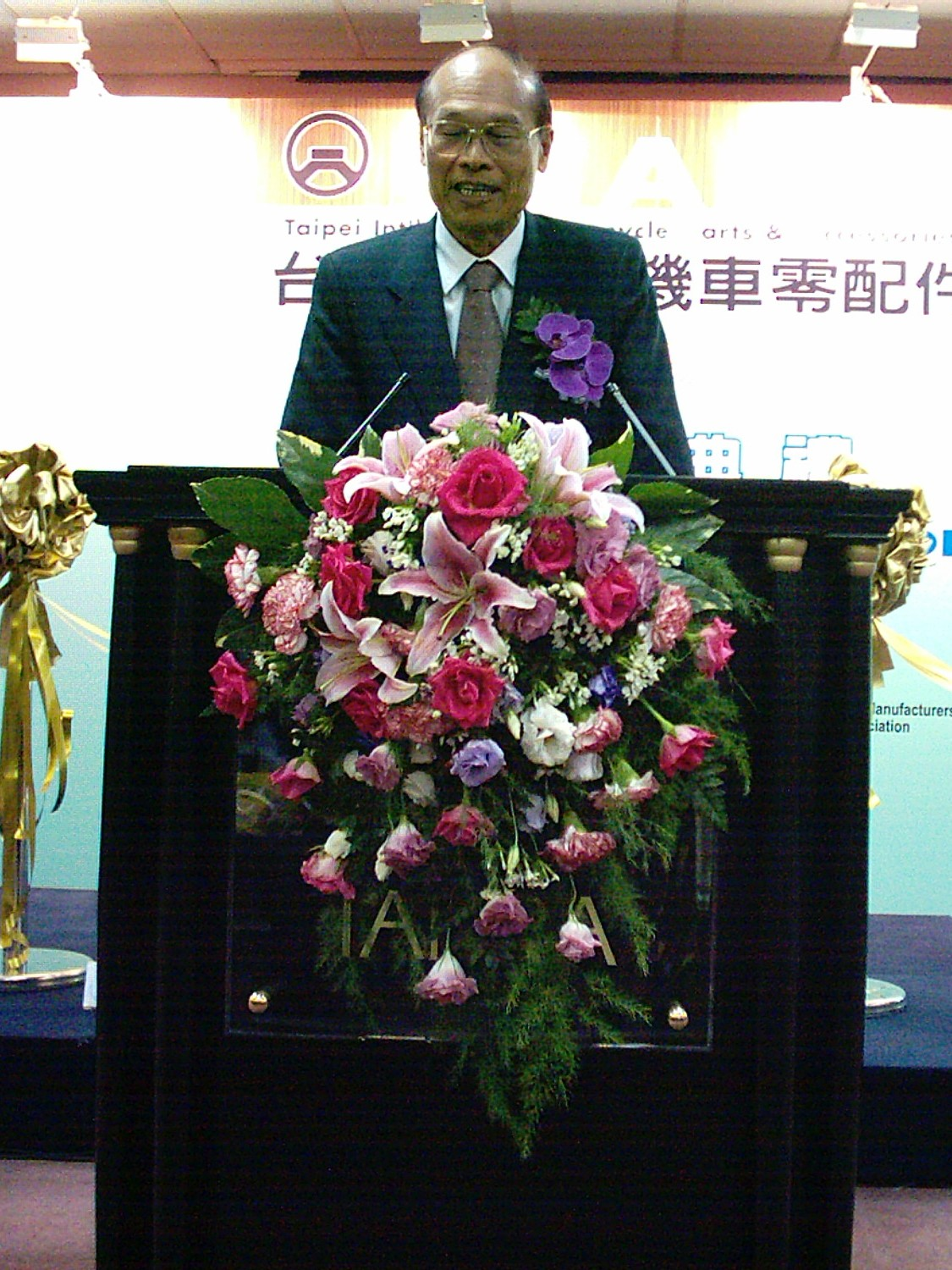

Minister of Economic Affairs
- In office 25 January 2006 – 4 August 2006
- Preceded by: Ho Mei-yueh
- Succeeded by: Steve Chen

Personal details
- Born: 18 April 1941 (age 85) Taichu Prefecture, Taiwan, Empire of Japan (today Changhua County, Taiwan)
- Education: National Chung Hsing University (BA); National Chengchi University (MA, PhD)

Huang Ing-san (Chinese: 黃營杉; born 18 April 1941), also known by his English name Morgan Hwang, is a Taiwanese business executive and politician.

== Education ==
Hwang graduated from National Chung Hsing University with a bachelor's degree in economics in 1967, then earned a Master of Business Administration (M.B.A.) in 1971 and his Ph.D. in business administration in 1986 from National Chengchi University. His doctoral dissertation was titled, "The management of our country's military strategists" (Chinese: 我國兵家之管理思想).

== Career ==
His teaching career, some of which was spent at NCHU, spanned three decades. Hwang spent eleven years working for Sampo Corporation, seven years at China Color Printing, and two years with Yeu Tyan Machinery Manufacturing.

He became chairman of Taiwan Tobacco and Liquor Corporation in October 2002, shortly after TTL had been renamed from the Taiwan Tobacco and Wine Monopoly Bureau. Weeks after taking the position, Hwang backed government efforts to test for bootleg rice wine, announcing that TTL would provide free wine testing in partnerships with local authorities. He stated in 2003 that TTL's Long Life cigarettes would be sold in China. However, the products did not hit the Chinese market until late 2004. Hwang's attempt to market Taiwan Beer in China saw similar delays. Under Hwang, TTL also turned to younger drinkers and the international market to expand business. As chairman, Hwang explored privatization of the company with multiple investors. However, employees rejected the plan in an April 2004 vote. Later, Hwang stated that privatization would still occur.

In July 2005, Huang assumed the chairmanship of the Taiwan Power Company.

== Ministry of Economic Affairs ==
Hwang was appointed Minister of Economic Affairs in January 2006. He approved Taipower's first rate increase in 23 years that May. In June, Huang visited Indonesia, the first time since 2001 that a Taiwanese cabinet official was invited to an economic conference there. Later that month, Hwang signed a free trade agreement with Nicuraugua, represented by Alejandro José Arguello Choiseul. Hwang stepped down from the Ministry of Economic Affairs in August 2006.
