= Yeh Chu-lan =

Vice Premier of Taiwan from 2004 to 2005

- 葉菊蘭
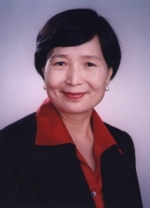
- Official portrait, 2004

Senior Advisor to the President
- In office 9 November 2016 – 20 May 2024
- President: Tsai Ing-wen

25th Secretary-General to the President
- In office 20 August 2007 – 22 March 2008
- President: Chen Shui-bian
- Preceded by: Cho Jung-tai (acting)
- Succeeded by: Mark Chen

Acting Mayor of Kaohsiung
- In office 20 December 2005 – 25 December 2006
- Preceded by: Chen Chi-mai (acting)
- Succeeded by: Chen Chu

24th Vice Premier of the Republic of China
- In office 20 May 2004 – 21 February 2005
- Premier: Yu Shyi-kun
- Preceded by: Lin Hsin-i
- Succeeded by: Wu Rong-i

2nd Minister of the Hakka Affairs Council
- In office 1 February 2002 – 19 May 2004
- Premier: Yu Shyi-kun
- Preceded by: Fan Kuang-chun
- Succeeded by: Luo Wen-jia

18th Minister of Transportation and Communications
- In office 20 May 2000 – 1 February 2002
- Premier: Tang Fei; Chang Chun-hsiung
- Preceded by: Chen Shih-yi
- Succeeded by: Lin Ling-san

Member of the Legislative Yuan
- In office 1 December 1990 – 20 May 2000
- Constituency: Taipei 2 (1990–1993; 1996–2000); Taiwan (1993–1996)

Personal details
- Born: 13 February 1949 (age 77) Tongluo, Miaoli County, Taiwan
- Party: Democratic Progressive Party
- Spouse: Cheng Nan-jung
- Education: Fu Jen Catholic University (BA)

Yeh Chu-lan (Chinese: 葉菊蘭; pinyin: Yè Júlán; Wade–Giles: Yeh Chü-lan; born 1949) is a Taiwanese politician who served as the Vice Premier of the Republic of China under the Yu Shyi-kun cabinet. She has also served as the acting Mayor of Kaohsiung, Minister of Transportation and Communications, Minister of Council for Hakka Affairs, and the secretary-general of the presidential office of Taiwan under the Chen Shui-bian government. She was the senior advisor to President Tsai Ing-wen.

== Career ==
Yeh worked in advertising for seventeen years prior to entering politics after her husband, Cheng Nan-jung, a dissident, chose to commit suicide rather than be arrested in 1989.

In 1992, she was the deputy convener of the Democratic Progressive Party (DPP) Caucus in Legislative Yuan, and convener in 1995.

=== First DPP administration ===
From 2000 to 2002, Yeh was third in the Cabinet in her position as Minister of Transportation and Communications. She was Chairperson of the Council for Hakka Affairs from 2002 to 2004. In 2004 she was named Vice Premier, as well as Minister of Consumer Protection and Minister responsible for the Council for Economic Planning and Development. In late 2005, she became the first female acting mayor of Kaohsiung when then-mayor Frank Hsieh was appointed Premier.

She was sworn in as the Presidential Office secretary-general in August 2007.

Yeh was amongst the front runners to serve as DPP 2008 presidential candidate Frank Hsieh's vice-presidential running mate, however former Premier and DPP Chairman Su Tseng-chang was eventually chosen for the role.

=== Second & third DPP administration ===
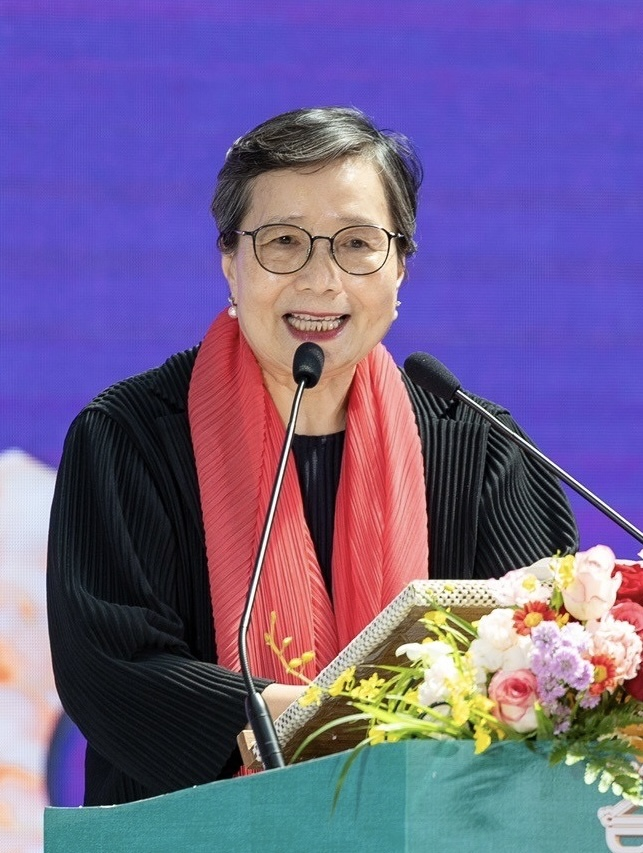
Yeh in 2024

During the Presidency of Tsai Ing-wen, Yeh served as the senior advisor of the Office of the President.

In 2017, she was elected chairwoman of the Taiwan Visitors Association.

Preceded by Chen Shih-yi	Minister of Transportation and Communications; 2000–2002	Succeeded by Lin Ling-san
Preceded by Fan Kuang-chun	Minister of the Hakka Affairs Council; 2002–2004	Succeeded by Luo Wen-jia
Preceded by Lin Shin-yi	Vice Premier of the Republic of China; 2004–2005	Succeeded by Wu Rong-yi
Preceded by Chen Chi-mai	Mayor of Kaohsiung (Acting); 2005–2006	Succeeded by Chen Chu
Preceded by Chiou I-jen	Secretary-General to the President; 2007–2008	Succeeded by Mark Chen
