= Tsai Duei =

Taiwanese politician (born 1947)

- 蔡堆
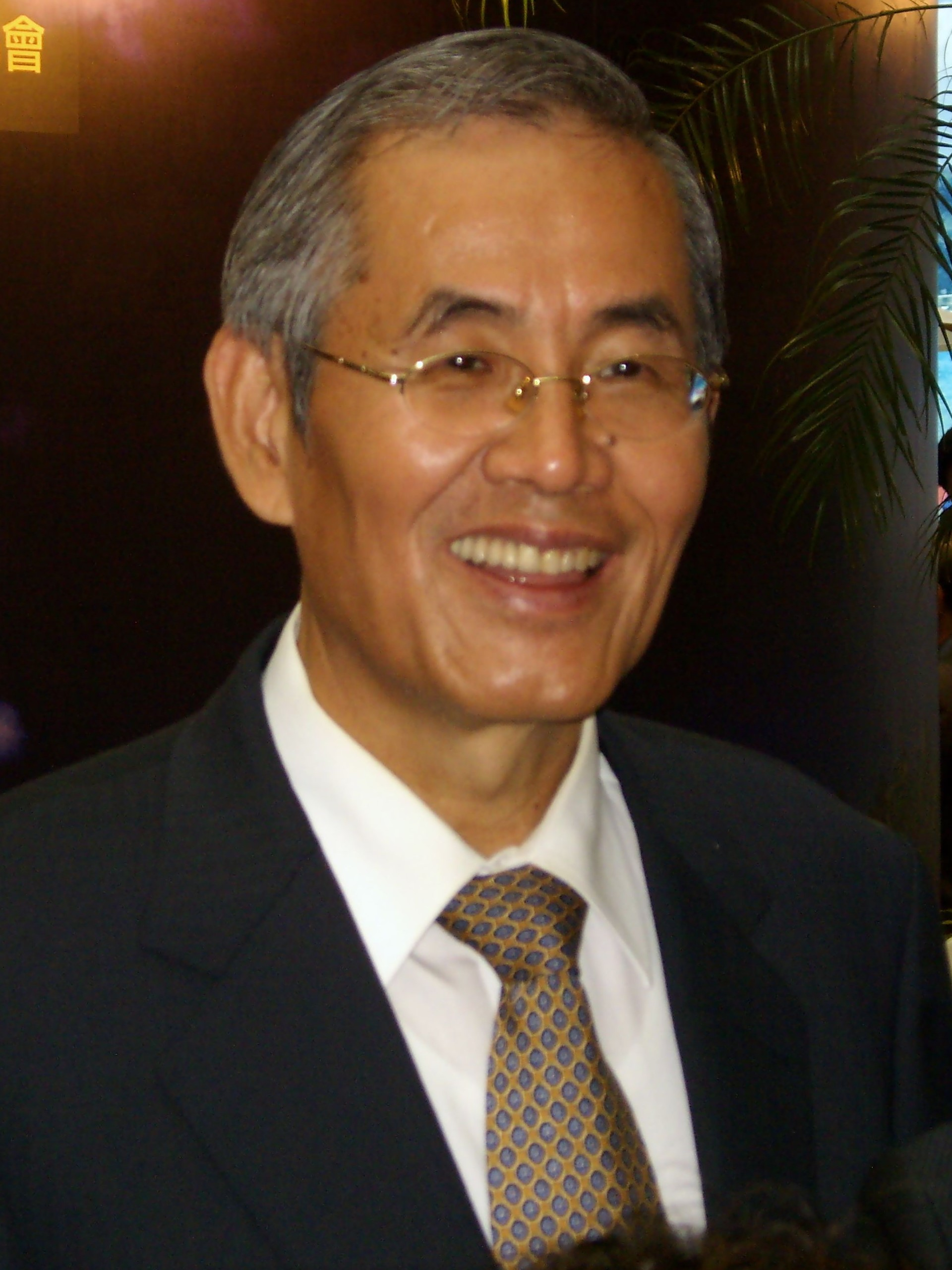

Minister of Transportation and Communications of the Republic of China
- In office 25 August 2006 – 20 May 2008
- Preceded by: Kuo Yao-chi
- Succeeded by: Mao Chi-kuo

Personal details
- Born: 1 December 1947 (age 78) Taichung, Taiwan
- Education: National Taipei University of Technology (BS); National Taiwan University (MS, PhD)

Tsai Duei (Chinese: 蔡堆; pinyin: Cài Duī; born 1 December 1947) is a Taiwanese electrical engineer who served as the Minister of Transportation and Communications.

== Education ==
Tsai graduated from National Taipei University of Technology in 1968 with a bachelor's degree in electrical engineering. He then earned a master's degree in electronic engineering from National Taiwan University (NTU) in 1983 and earned his Ph.D. from NTU in electrical engineering in 1987.
