= Central Geological Survey =

Government agency in Taiwan

- 中央地質調查所
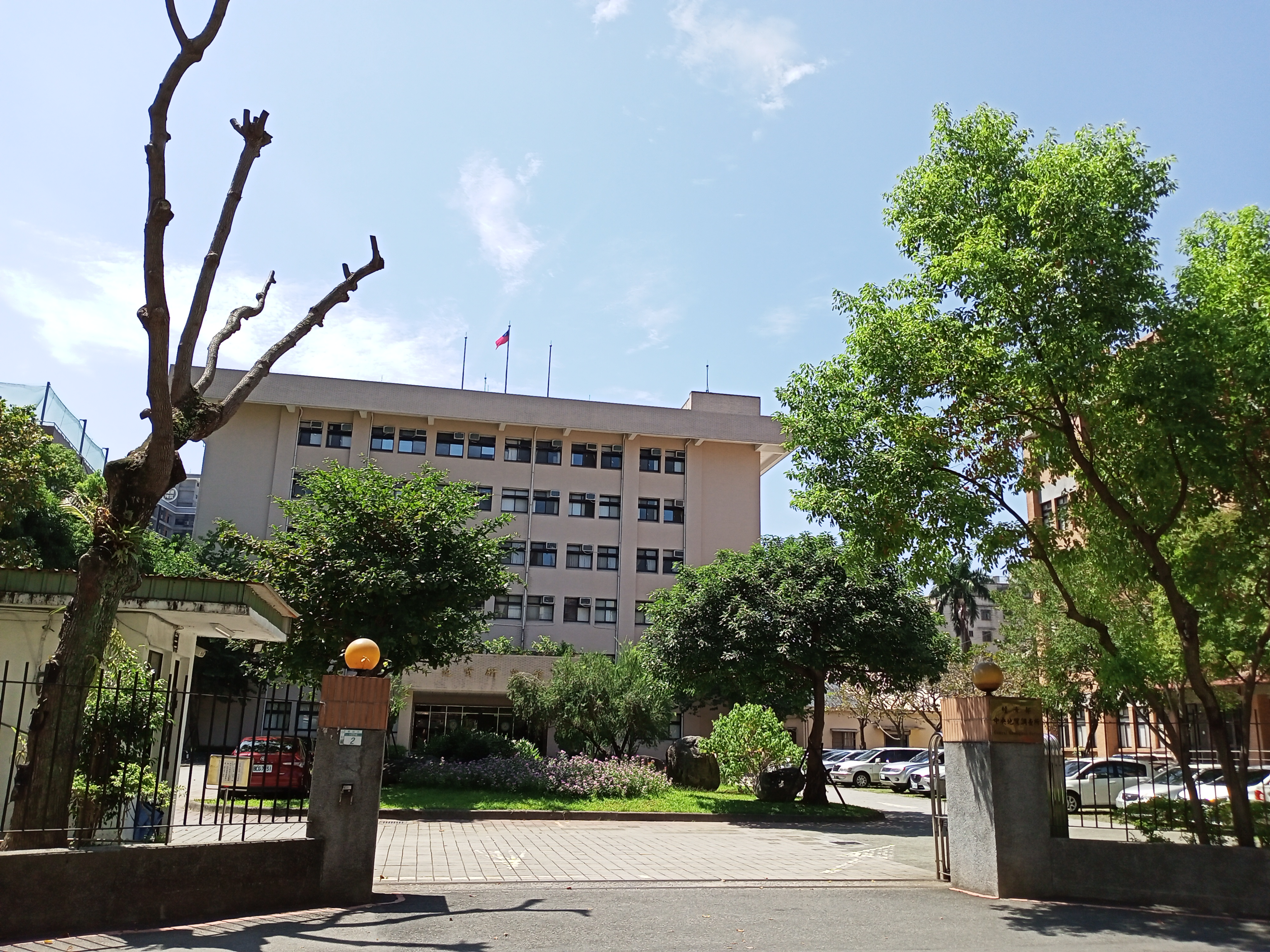

Agency overview
- Formed: 20 November 1978
- Preceding agency: Provincial Geological Survey of Taiwan
- Jurisdiction: Taiwan
- Headquarters: Zhonghe, New Taipei; 24°58′57.4″N 121°30′30.8″E
- Parent ministry: Ministry of Economic Affairs
- Website: Official website

The Central Geological Survey (CGS; traditional Chinese: 經濟部中央地質調查所; simplified Chinese: 经济部中央地质调查所; pinyin: Jīngjì Bù Zhōngyāng Dìzhí Diàochá Suǒ) is the government agency of the Ministry of Economic Affairs of the Taiwan (ROC) responsible for geological surveys and geoscience research.

== History ==
The CGS was founded on 20 November 1978 replacing the former Provincial Geological Survey of Taiwan.

== Organizational structures ==
- Planning Office
- Regional Geology Division
- Active Tectonics Division
- Environmental and Engineering Geology Division
- Geological Resource Division
- Geological Information Division
- Secretarial Office
- Personnel Office
- Accounting Office
- Discipline Office

== Transportation ==
The CGS headquarter office is accessible within walking distance south of Nanshijiao Station of Taipei Metro.

== See also ==
- Ministry of Economic Affairs (Taiwan)
- Geology of Taiwan
