= Ho Mei-yueh =

Taiwanese politician

- 何美玥
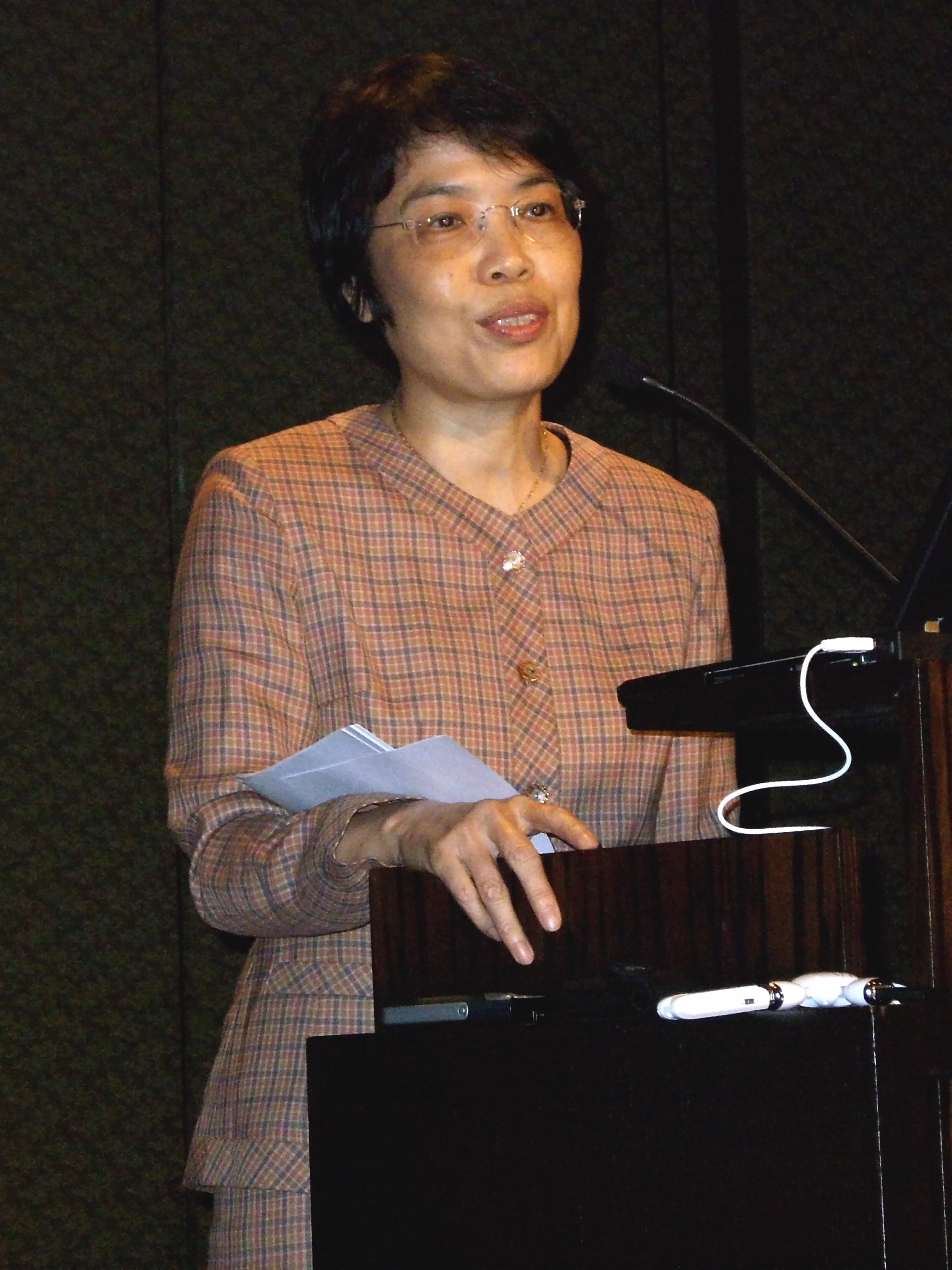

Minister of Council for Economic Planning and Development
- In office 21 May 2007 – 20 May 2008
- Preceded by: Hu Sheng-cheng
- Succeeded by: Chen Tain-jy

Minister of Economic Affairs
- In office 20 May 2004 – 25 January 2006
- Preceded by: Lin Yi-fu
- Succeeded by: Huang Ing-san

Personal details
- Born: 9 January 1951 (age 75)
- Party: Democratic Progressive Party
- Education: National Taiwan University (BS); National Chengchi University (MS)

Ho Mei-yueh (Chinese: 何美玥; pinyin: Hé Měiyuè; born 9 January 1951) is a Taiwanese politician.

== Education ==
Ho earned a B.S. in agricultural chemistry from National Taiwan University and a master's degree in technology management and business administration at National Chengchi University.

== Political career ==
Ho joined the Ministry of Economic Affairs in 1975 by becoming a technician at the Industrial Development Bureau, where she was promoted to deputy director-general in 1994. She was named the economics minister in 2004 and served until 2006. She then led the Council for Economic Planning and Development from 2007 to 2008. Tsai Ing-wen offered Ho the opportunity to return as Minister of Economic Affairs in 2016, but she did not accept, leading the Tsai administration to select Chih-Kung Lee instead.

In 2021, Ho received Japan's Order of the Rising Sun, Gold and Silver Star, for her contributions to "facilitating exchanges between Taiwan and Japan in the areas of economics and science and technology.".
