= Agency for International Trade Information and Co-operation =

Geneva-based intergovernmental organisation

The Agency for International Trade Information and Cooperation (AITIC) was a Geneva-based intergovernmental organisation whose mandate was to assist the less-advantaged countries (LACs) to have a more active trade diplomacy by assisting them in better understanding the technicalities of trade rules and World Trade Organization (WTO) agreements. AITIC was founded to contribute to the improvement of their position in the multilateral trading system, to promote good economic governance and trade-led growth which will lead the LACs to benefit from globalisation process.

The AITIC resulted from a 2002 multilateral treaty known as the Agreement establishing the Agency for International Trade Information and Co-operation as an Intergovernmental Organisation. The AITIC was created in 2004 when the agreement entered into force. Due to the sponsoring states' dissatisfaction with the manner in which funds were being expended by the organisation, AITIC closed in early 2011.

== Membership ==
The sponsoring states of AITIC were Denmark, Finland, Ireland, Netherlands, Sweden, Switzerland, and the United Kingdom. Taiwan ratified the agreement in 2009 and also became a sponsor state. From 2008 to 2010, all these states except Ireland denounced the agreement and left the organisation. Prior to the denunciations, there were 61 LACs that were participating countries in the organisation.

== Activities ==
LACs have traditionally not had active participation in the multilateral trading system and face structural and institutional constraints regarding international trade issues. Most of these countries have small missions and not enough human resources to monitor the work of the trade-related organisations in Geneva. Some of them are so poor or so small that they do not even have a permanent representation in Geneva. AITIC therefore works to improve their participation and voice in trade negotiations. Through its Non-Residents' Unit (NRU), AITIC provides those members and observers of the WTO absent from Geneva a constant flow of relevant information on trade-related developments, the Doha negotiations as well as logistical and substantive support. AITIC organises a regular AITIC Session within the WTO's yearly Geneva Weeks.

As one size does not fit all, AITIC's personalised approach to assist the representatives of the LACs to better understand the rules of the MTS has been its trademark. One of the best known examples of the tools AITIC has developed to assist the LAC representatives is its Glossary of Most Commonly Used International Trade Terms with Particular Reference to the WTO, which is in its second edition and has been translated into the three official languages of the WTO (English, French and Spanish) and also into Portuguese, Russian and Macedonian. The agency's flexible structure allows it to provide tailor-made services to address the particular needs of the LACs for information and analysis on a wide range of issues concerning trade and development in the context of the WTO. Examples of such services are: organisation of workshops and "Flash Meetings", on topics of interest to the LACs (i.e., Safeguards, Services, WTO Rules), publishing information notes (e.g., Aid for Trade, the Enhanced Integrated Framework for LDCs). In addition, its Official Fellowship Programme provides on-the-job training for LAC officials. AITIC's recent capacity building programmes have included courses for Geneva-based delegates on Services and Agriculture. Most of the AITIC activities (and website) are provided in the three official languages of the WTO. Finally, LACs have unrestricted access to the facilities of the Non-Residents' Unit. AITIC was an initiative of Switzerland's federal authorities to assist resource constrained developing countries and economies in transition to have a more active trade diplomacy. Originally set up as an association under Swiss private law, AITIC was transformed into an intergovernmental organisation in 2004 and has been funded during its first five-year budgetary cycle by seven Sponsoring Members (Denmark, Finland, Ireland, the Netherlands, Sweden, Switzerland and the UK). At present, AITIC has 59 Participating Members and four in the process of accession. AITIC has been the subject of two external evaluations by a Dutch consultancy, ECORYS, one in 2004 and the most recent one in 2007. A "perception audit" was performed by Burson-Marsteller in 2007.

AITIC has a tradition of collaboration with other trade-related organisations, in particular WTO, United Nations Conference on Trade and Development (UNCTAD), International Trade Commission, UNIDO, UNOHRLLS and has observer status in UNCTAD's Trade and Development Board; WIPO's Intergovernmental Committee on Intellectual Property and Genetic Resources, Traditional Knowledge and Folklore; the Inter-Parliamentary Union's Annual Conference on the WTO; and the Organisation Africaine de la Propriété Intellectuelle.

AITIC's assistance has been acknowledged by several groups of LACs, in particular the Landlocked Developing Countries and the small and vulnerable economies.

== Criticism and disestablishment ==
The Finnish government was reported as believing that it has been misled into financing the agency. It believed it was helping developing countries but, following an evaluation of AITIC's activities in February 2008, the donor countries discovered that the organisation had merely recruited rich nations as members and had predominantly spent the money on seminars and cocktail parties.

Another criticism of the agency stems from the fact that according to AITIC's most recent annual report, in excess of two thirds of the donor-funded budget is allocated to staff salaries.

As of 2009, AITIC lost the bulk of its funding, retaining only three donor states, which committed only to two further years of funding. By 2011, all sponsoring states except Ireland had denounced the agreement and the organisation ceased to operate.
