= Wang Chih-kang =

Taiwanese politician

- 王志剛
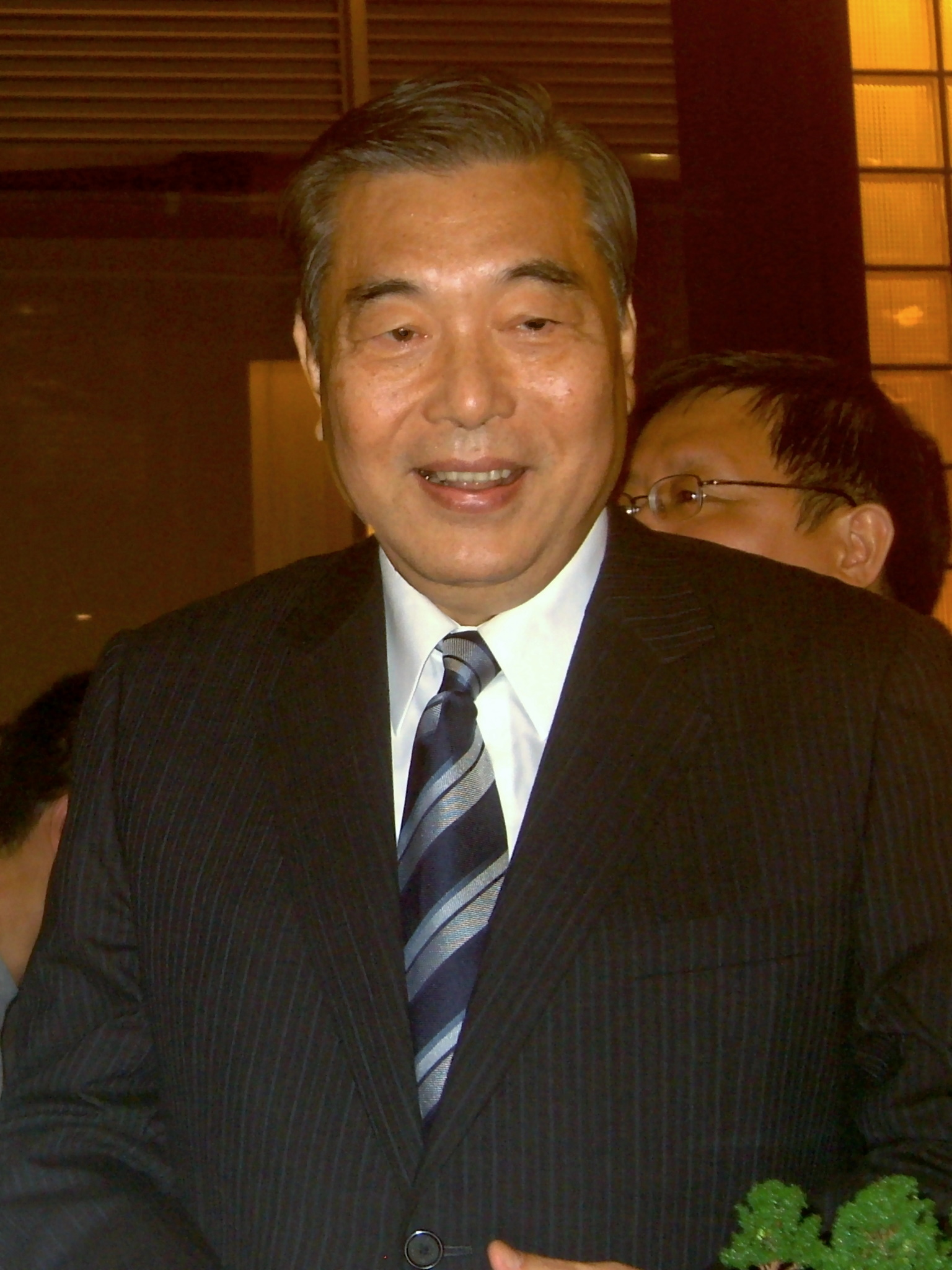
- Wang in October 2009

Chairman of the Taiwan Institute of Economic Research
- Incumbent
- Assumed office January 2019
- Preceded by: Chiang Pin-kung

Chairman of the Taiwan External Trade Development Council
- In office 2 July 2008 – September 2014
- Preceded by: Hsu Chih-jen
- Succeeded by: Francis Liang

Minister of Economic Affairs of the Republic of China
- In office 10 June 1996 – 19 May 2000
- Preceded by: Chiang Pin-kung
- Succeeded by: Lin Hsin-i

Chairman of the Fair Trade Commission
- In office 27 January 1992 – 9 June 1996
- Preceded by: Office established
- Succeeded by: Chao Yang-ching

Personal details
- Born: 7 September 1942 (age 83) Anxin, Hebei, China
- Party: Kuomintang
- Education: National Taiwan University (BS); Texas A&M University (MBA, PhD)

Wang Chih-kang (Chinese: 王志剛; born 7 September 1942) is a Taiwanese politician.

Wang was the first chairman of the Fair Trade Commission between 1992 and 1996. He then served as Ministry of Economic Affairs until 2000. From July 2008 to September 2014, Wang led the Taiwan External Trade Development Council. In January 2019, Wang was appointed chairman of the Taiwan Institute of Economic Research. Wang has also served on the Central Standing Committee of the Kuomintang.

== Education ==
Wang graduated from National Taiwan University with a bachelor's degree in agricultural economics in 1967. He then completed graduate studies in the United States, earning a Master of Business Administration (M.B.A.) in 1975 and his Ph.D. in marketing in 1978, both from Texas A&M University. His doctoral dissertation was titled, "The effect of foreign economic, political and cultural environment on consumers' willingness to buy foreign products".
