= Kuo Yao-chi =

Taiwanese administrative official (1956–2025)

- 郭瑤琪

Minister of Transportation and Communications
- In office 25 January 2006 – 25 August 2006
- Preceded by: Lin Ling-san
- Succeeded by: Tsai Duei

Minister of Public Construction Commission
- In office 1 February 2002 – 25 January 2006
- Preceded by: Lin Neng-pai
- Succeeded by: Wu Tze-cheng

Personal details
- Born: 13 March 1956 Hualien County, Taiwan
- Died: 24 March 2025 (aged 69) Tapei, Taiwan
- Party: Democratic Progressive Party (since 2002)
- Education: National Cheng Kung University (BS); University of London (MSc)

Kuo Yao-chi (Chinese: 郭瑤琪; pinyin: Guō Yáoqí; 13 March 1956 – 24 March 2025) was a Taiwanese administrative official who served as Minister of Transportation and Communications.

== Life and career ==
Kuo Yao-chi was fascinated by music since childhood and had won the first place of Taoyuan County Junior Piano Competition. Kuo graduated from National Cheng Kung University's Department of Urban Planning; she went to England where she earned her master's degree in Urban Development and the New Town Development from the University of London. Kuo passed the National Higher Examination for Urban Planning and was one of the few excellent female executives from the grassroots in Taiwan.

Kuo started her occupation as an assistant researcher at the Urban Design and Environmental Planning Lab in Tamkang University, a planner in the Taiwan Housing and Urban Development Bureau, senior planner in the Taipei Urban Planning Committee, section chief of the Public Works Bureau, and Information Team Leader. Kuo once handled a major urban planning project, saved more than 260 million NT dollars of public funds for the Taipei City Government and had been awarded an excellent performance by the Taipei City Government. Because of her devotion to work, she was appreciated by colleagues and the major. Kuo was promoted as a secretary general of the Public Works Bureau and after that the first female director general of the Public Housing Department in the Taipei City Government. Kuo had successfully solved sea sand houses, slanted houses, and radiation houses problems. She was reforming public housing rental management system, abolishing unfair manner of priority waiting roster, and the first to create leasehold housing for low-income families. In the year 2000, Kuo served as a director of Public Affairs of the Presidential Office, minister without portfolio, and chair of the Public Construction Commission of the Executive Yuan in 2002. Meanwhile, she also served as the CEO of the 921 Post-earthquake Disaster Recovery Commission to accelerate the reconstruction works in the aftermath of the 1999 Jiji earthquake (known as the "921 earthquake" in Taiwan). For Kuo's great achievement in recovering and revitalizing the 1999 earthquake disaster areas, she was awarded the Alumni Distinguished Achievement Award of the National Cheng Kung University in 2004.

In year 2006, Kuo served as a minister of the Ministry of Transportation and Communications. One of her great achievements was to complete and officially open the 12.9 km Hsuehshan Tunnel (雪山隧道) -- Asia's longest and the world's fourth-longest. However, she resigned her commission being responsible for the policy of electronic toll collection system (ETC).

Kuo Yao-chi was a devout Buddhist, often participating in the religious and social welfare activities, such as continuing to care for the Xiao-lin Village reconstruction, assist surviving families’ livelihoods, initiated "School Nest” volunteer activities, and involving herself as a volunteer teacher. She brought the community together to care for children of low-income families in Tataocheng (大稻埕) area. She also cared for elderly parents with dementia.

Kuo died from an aortic dissection at Shin Kong Wu Ho-Su Memorial Hospital in Taipei, on 24 March 2025, at the age of 69.

== Controversy ==
After Kuo left office, she was accused of receiving a bribe of US$20,000 by the prosecutors monitoring chair of Nan Ren Hu Lee Ching-po (李清波) telling his son Lee Tsung-hsien (李宗賢) to present two cans of tea to Kuo, and putting US$20,000 to help Kuo's son studying abroad on the phone call in 2006.

The Supreme Court upheld the conviction handed down by the Taiwan High Court in March, which found Kuo guilty of accepting a bribe related to using her position as transportation minister to grant favors to the Nan Ren Hu Group, a service industry conglomerate, even though she had been found not guilty in first and second trials in 2009 and 2010 respectively.

"I have never received bribes... A reputation is not earned in one or two days. I have spent my entire career as a public servant building a good reputation. All my associates know I am not someone who can be bribed," Kuo told a press conference in Taipei.

The former minister held a press conference insisting she was innocent. Kuo was accompanied by her lawyers Wellington Koo and Li Yung-ran (李永然), as well as Taipei mayoral candidate Ko Wen-je and others. They all claimed the conviction was flawed because of insufficient evidence and inconsistent testimony from Lee Tsung-hsien, son of Nan Ren Hu chairman Lee Ching-po. They said they would sue Lee Tsung-hsien for perjury and request a retrial and an extraordinary appeal.

Lee Tsung-hsien testified that he had been asked by his father to deliver the cash, but he gave inconsistent information about the numbers, color and material of the tea gift boxes that contained the US$20,000 and were allegedly delivered to Kuo, at first saying that the cash was placed in two iron tea boxes.

He revoked his deposition after Kuo submitted a red tea box, which prosecutors failed to find in a raid of her house, and subsequently said that there was only one cardboard tea box.

The Ministry of Justice's Investigation Bureau later canceled Lee Tsung-hsien's original testimony, Koo said.

"In other words, Kuo’s conviction was upheld with inconsistent testimony and without any substantial evidence because no cash was ever found — not in the tea box nor in any of Kuo’s or her family’s bank accounts," Koo said. "I'm wondering if the judicial system applies a different set of standards for DPP politicians and government officials who served under the DPP administration."

The opposition Democratic Progressive Party's regular weekly Central Standing Committee meeting concluded with a call for a new review of the case to give Kuo an opportunity to clear her name, and voiced its support for her.

The DPP motion praised Kuo's performance in office during the administration of President Chen Shui-bian from 2000 to 2008 and warned against the political exploitation of the judiciary against the opposition in the run-up to the 6 December 2014 local elections.

Kuo appeared at a separate news conference earlier where she pleaded her innocence and received the support of former Cabinet colleagues and opposition activists.

Former DPP Chairwoman Tsai Ing-wen also released a statement supporting Kuo's case for judicial redress.

Kuo began serving an eight-year prison sentence in January 2014, and was released on medical parole in January 2016, following a cancer diagnosis.

== Souerces ==
- Taiwan News, Kuo Yao-chi continues to proclaim innocence of bribery charges, 8 December 2013
- The China Post, Sentenced ex-transport minister mulling extraordinary appeal, 9 December 2013
- Taipei Times, Fairness in judiciary essential to democracy, 21 December 2013
- Taipei Times, Kuo corruption case shows judiciary ‘barbaric’: experts, 27 December 2013
