= Ministry of Economic Affairs (Taiwan) =

Ministry of the Republic of China

- 經濟部; Jīngjìbù (Mandarin); Kîn-chi Phu (Hakka)
- Logo of the Ministry of Economic Affairs

- Seal of the Ministry of Economic Affairs (經濟部印)

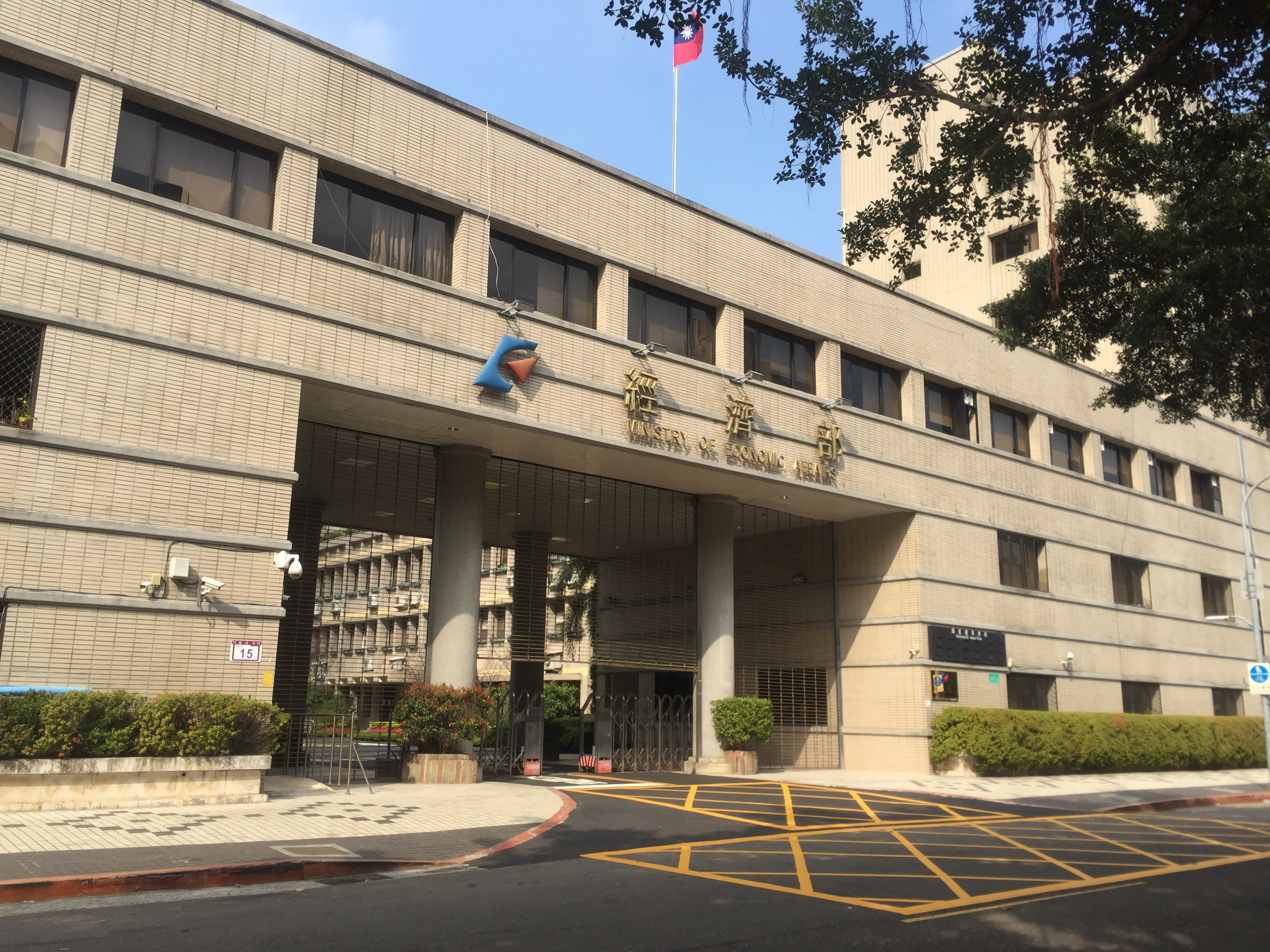

Agency overview
- Formed: June 1931 (as National Economic Council); December 1937 (as MOEA)
- Jurisdiction: Taiwan
- Headquarters: Zhongzheng, Taipei
- Minister responsible: Kung Ming-hsin
- Website: www.moea.gov.tw

The Ministry of Economic Affairs (MOEA; Chinese: 經濟部; pinyin: Jīngjìbù; Pe̍h-ōe-jī: Keng-chè-pō͘) is the ministry of the Republic of China (Taiwan) responsible for formulating policy and laws for industry and trade, foreign direct investment, energy, minerals, measurement standards, intellectual property, state-owned enterprises. The ministry is a cabinet level government agency of the Executive Yuan.

The executive agency promotes industrial and economic policies which allows economic activity and growth, increased employment and investments in sector which are critical to Taiwan's economy. Taiwan's main exports are electronics, computers, telecommunications equipment, industrial design services, creative and cultural industries.

== History ==
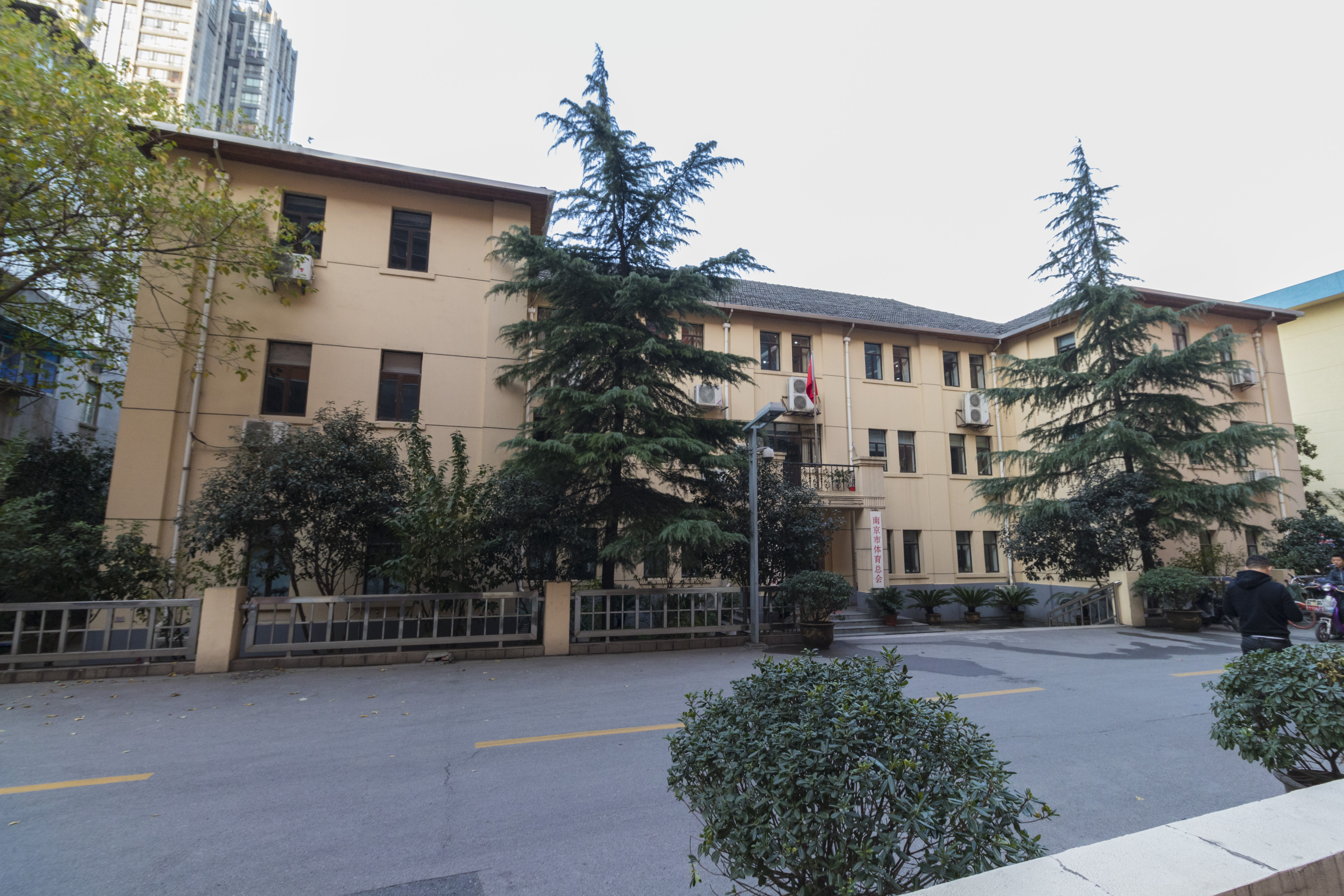
Former Ministry of Economic Affairs building in Nanjing.

MOEA was initially established in June 1931 as National Economic Council by the Executive Yuan. In December 1931, the council was merged with other organizations to create the Ministry of Basic Industries. In December 1937, the ministry was reorganized as the Ministry of Economic Affairs. The MOEA continued to function in Taiwan since 1949 after the Kuomintang was defeated on the mainland during the Chinese Civil War.

== Structure ==
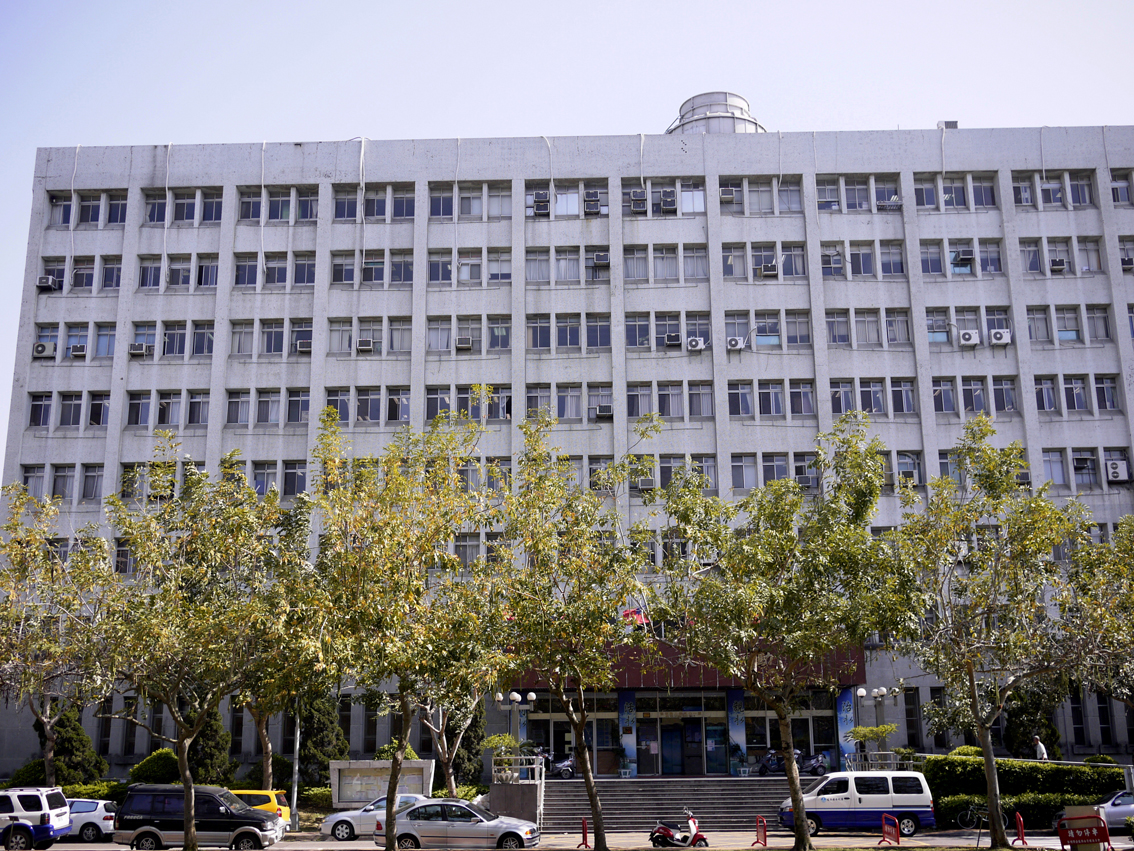
Water Resources Agency

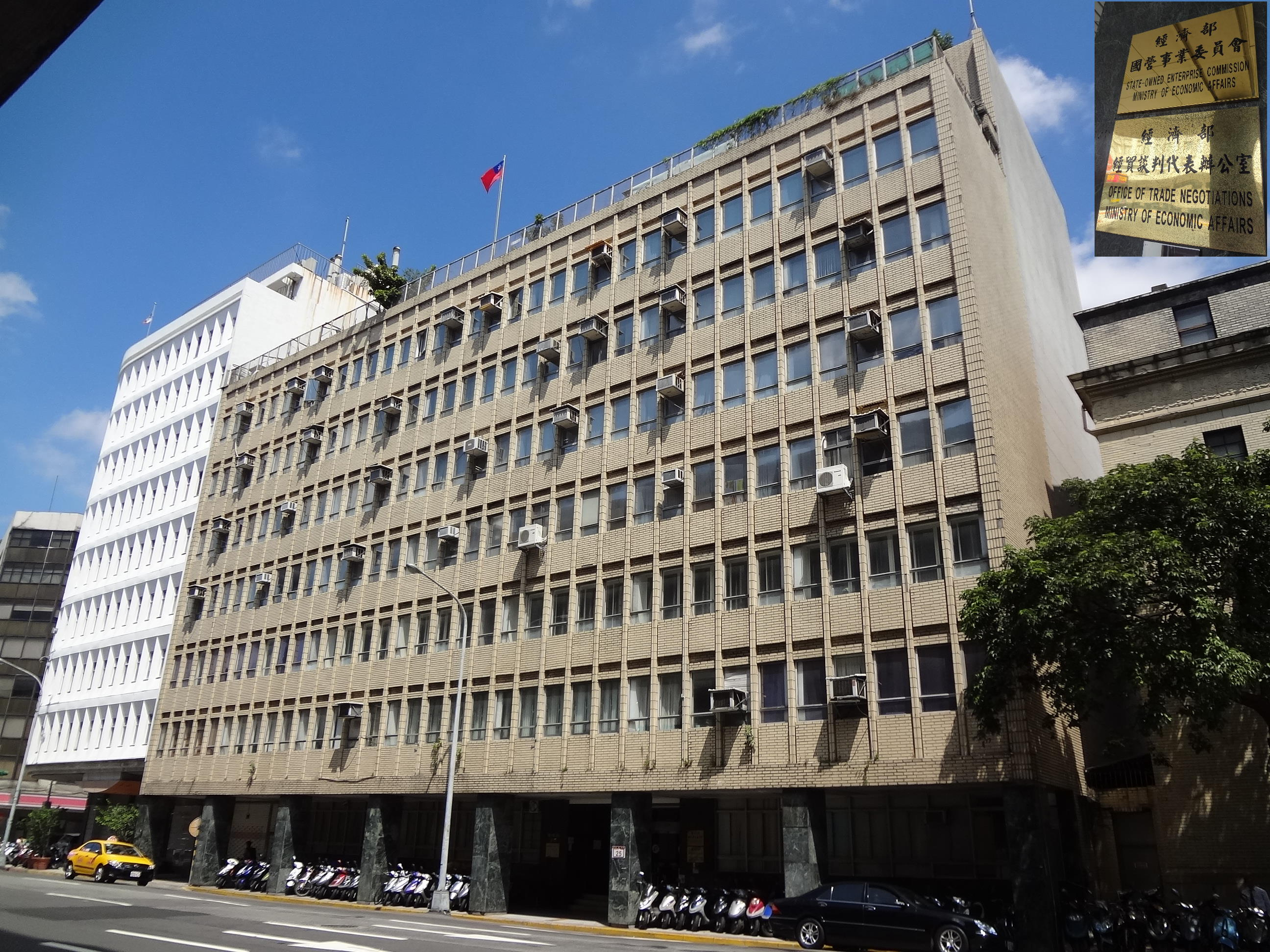
State-owned Enterprises Commission

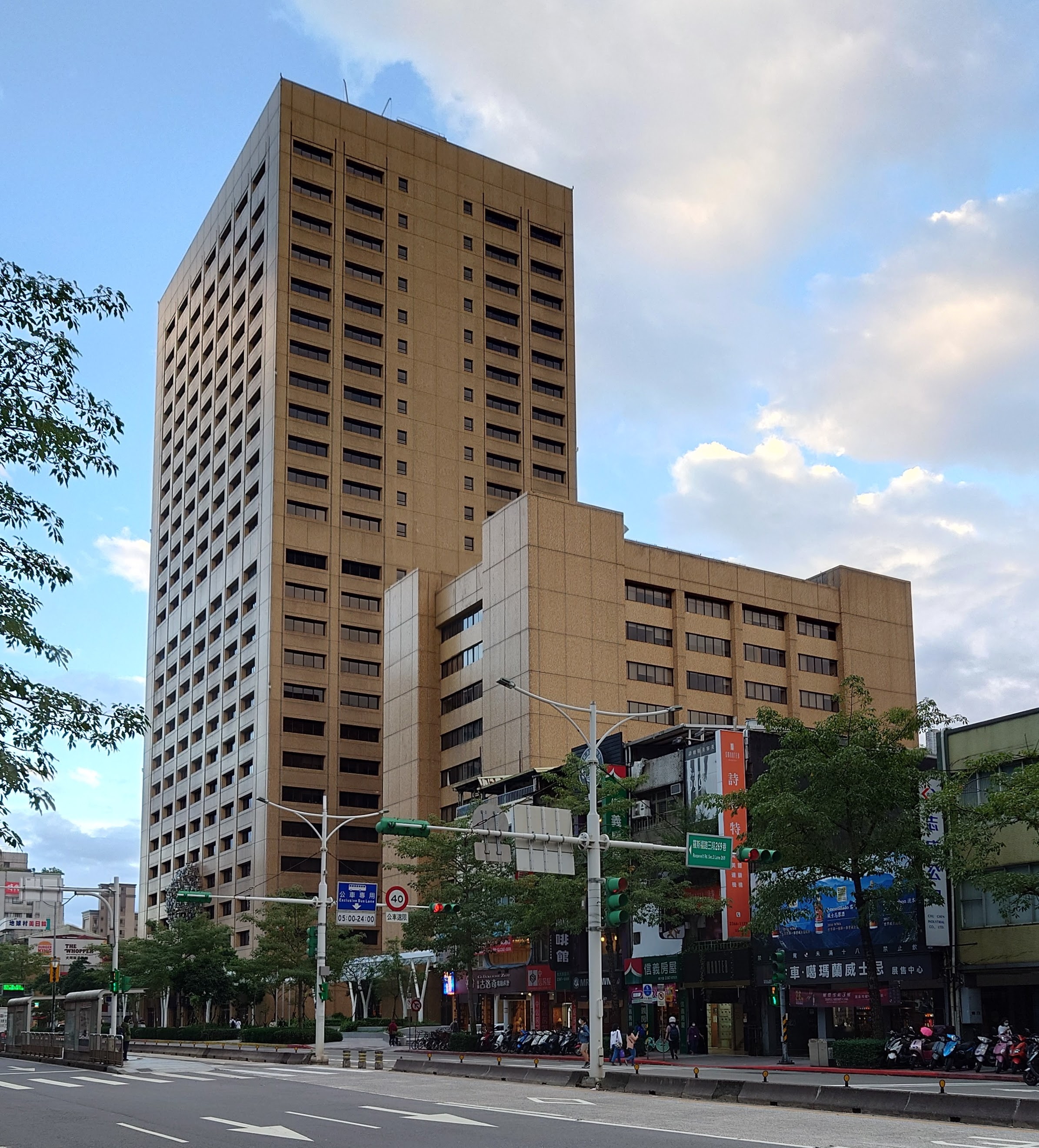
Taiwan Power Company

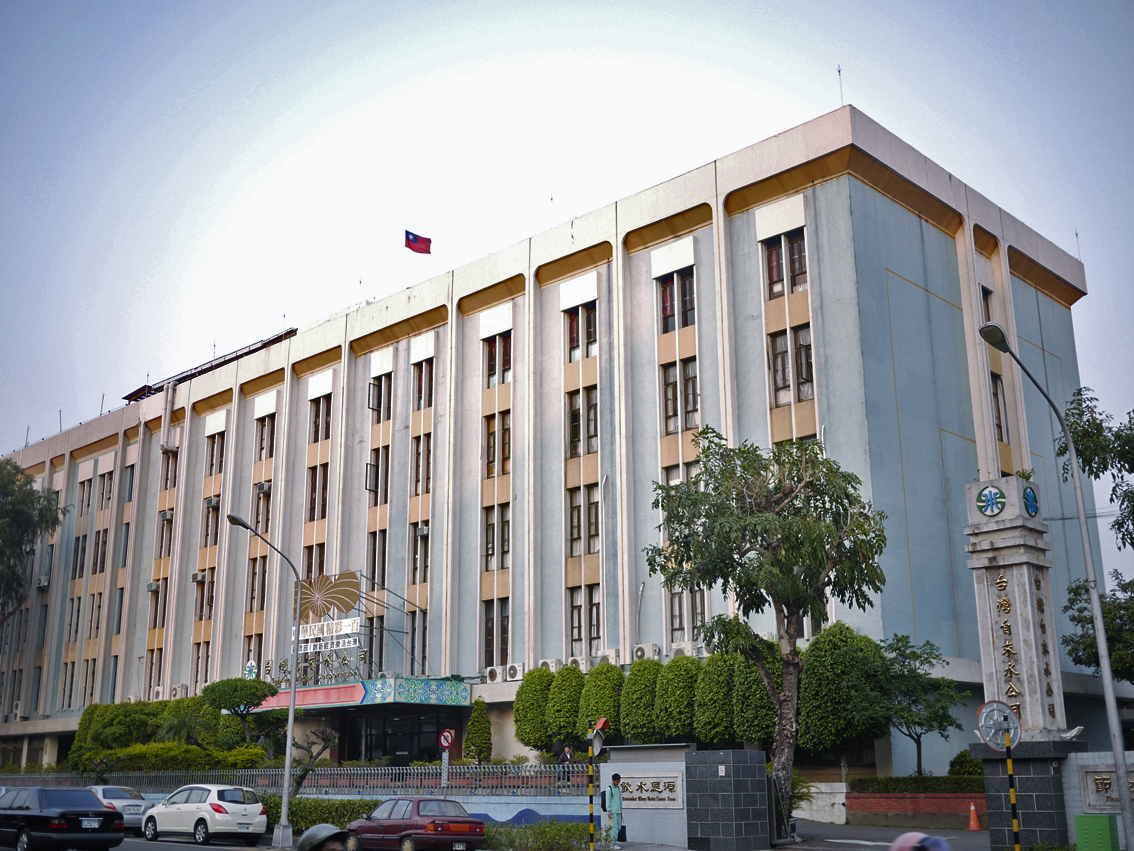
Taiwan Water Corporation

The Ministry of Economic Affairs is very important in the management of Taiwan's economy. It manages a number of statutory bodies and state owned enterprises.

=== Staff units ===
The internal structure of the MOEA:

- Department of General Planning
- Department of Industrial Technology
- Department of Investment Promotion
- Department of Investment Review
- Department of State-owned Enterprise Affairs
- Department of Economic Legal Affairs
- Department of General Affairs
- Department of Personnel
- Department of Civil Service Ethics
- Department of Accounting
- Department of Statistics
- Department of Information Management

=== Administrative agencies ===
The Ministry of Economic Affairs is responsible for the entire Taiwanese economy. It has a number of statutory administrative agencies reporting under it. They are:

- Industrial Development Administration
- Administration of Commerce
- Small and Medium Enterprise Administration
- International Trade Administration
- Energy Administration
- Water Resources Agency
- Intellectual Property Office
- Bureau of Standards, Metrology and Inspection
  - Keelung Branch
  - Hsinchu Branch
  - Taichung Branch
  - Tainan Branch
  - Kaohsiung Branch
  - Hualien Branch
- Bureau of Industrial Parks
  - Kaohsiung Export Processing Zone
  - Taichung Export Processing Zone
  - Chungkang Export Processing Zone
  - Pingtung Export Processing Zone
- Geological Survey and Mining Management Agency (formerly the Central Geological Survey and the Bureau of Mines)

=== National corporations ===
The Ministry of Economic Affairs have a number of state owned enterprises reporting to it. They are:

- Taiwan Sugar Corporation
- Taiwan Power Company
- CPC Corporation
- Taiwan Water Corporation

=== Overseas offices ===
Country	City	Name of office
Canada	Ottawa	Ottawa Economic Division, Taipei Economic and Cultural Office in Canada
Colombia	Bogotá	Bogotá, División Económica, Oficina Comercial de Taipei, Bogotá, Republica de Colombia
Switzerland	Bern	Bern Economic Division, Delegation Culturelle et Economique de Taipei
United States	Washington, D.C.	Washington, D.C. Economic Division, Taipei Economic and Cultural Representative Office in the United States

== List of ministers ==
=== Pre-1947 Constitution ===
- 1928: H. H. Kung
- 1931: Chen Kung-po
- 1935: Wu T’ing-chang (吳鼎昌)
- 1937: Ch’eng T’ien-ku (程天固)
- 1938: Weng Wenhao
- 1946: Wang Yun-wu

=== Post-1947 Constitution ===
Political Party: Chinese Youth Party Kuomintang Non-partisan/unknown

No.	Name	Term of Office		Days	Political Party	Cabinet
1	Chen Chi-tien 陳啟天	6 July 1948	27 December 1948	174	Youth	Weng Wenhao; Sun Fo
2	Liu Wei-chi 劉維熾	27 December 1948	1 April 1949	95	KMT	Sun Fo; He Yingqin
3	Sun Yue-chi 孫越琦	1 April 1949	16 June 1949	76		He Yingqin; Yan Xishan
4	Liu Hang-chen 劉航琛	16 June 1949	10 February 1950	239		Yan Xishan
5	Yen Chia-kan	10 February 1950	16 March 1950	34	KMT	Yan Xishan; Chen Cheng I
6	Cheng Tao-ju 鄭道儒	16 March 1950	7 May 1952	783		Chen Cheng I
7	T. K. Chang 張茲闓	7 May 1952	1 June 1954	938		Chen Cheng I
8	Yin Chung-jung	1 June 1954	1 December 1955	365	KMT	Yu Hung-chun
9	Kiang Piao 江杓	1 December 1955	26 March 1958	846		Yu Hung-chun
10	Yang Chi-tseng	26 March 1958	25 January 1965	2497		Yu Hung-chun; Chen Cheng II; Yen Chia-kan
11	Li Kwoh-ting	25 January 1965	4 July 1969	1621	KMT	Yen Chia-kan
12	Tao Sheng-yang 陶聲洋	4 July 1969	28 September 1969†	86	KMT	Yen Chia-kan
13	Sun Yun-suan	11 October 1969	1 June 1978	3155	KMT	Yen Chia-kan; Chiang Ching-kuo
14	Chang Kwang-shih 張光世	1 June 1978	1 December 1981	1279	KMT	Sun Yun-suan
15	Chao Yao-tung	1 December 1981	1 June 1984	913	KMT	Sun Yun-suan
16	Hsu Li-teh	1 June 1984	20 March 1985	292	KMT	Yu Kuo-hua
17	Lee Ta-hai	20 March 1985	22 July 1988	1220	KMT	Yu Kuo-hua
18	Chen Li-an	22 July 1988	1 June 1990	679	KMT	Yu Kuo-hua; Lee Huan
19	Vincent Siew	1 June 1990	27 February 1993	1002	KMT	Hau Pei-tsun
20	Chiang Pin-kung	27 February 1993	10 June 1996	1199	KMT	Lien Chan
21	Wang Chih-kang	10 June 1996	20 May 2000	1440	KMT	Lien Chan; Vincent Siew
22	Lin Hsin-i	20 May 2000	1 February 2002	622	Independent	Tang Fei; Chang Chun-hsiung I
23	Christine Tsung	1 February 2002	1 March 2002	28		Yu Shyi-kun
24	Lin Yi-fu	21 March 2002	20 May 2004	791	KMT	Yu Shyi-kun
25	Ho Mei-yueh	20 May 2004	25 January 2006	615		Yu Shyi-kun; Frank Hsieh
26	Morgan Hwang	25 January 2006	9 August 2006	196		Su Tseng-chang I
27	Steve Chen	9 August 2006	20 May 2008	650		Su Tseng-chang I Chang Chun-hsiung II
28	Yiin Chii-ming	20 May 2008	10 September 2009	478	KMT	Liu Chao-shiuan
29	Shih Yen-shiang	10 September 2009	18 February 2013	1257		Wu Den-yih; Sean Chen
30	Chang Chia-juch	18 February 2013	15 August 2014	543	KMT	Jiang Yi-huah
31	Woody Duh	16 August 2014	10 December 2014	116	Independent	Jiang Yi-huah
32	John Deng	10 December 2014	20 May 2016	527	Independent	Mao Chi-kuo; Chang San-cheng
33	Chih-Kung Lee	20 May 2016	15 August 2017	452		Lin Chuan
34	Shen Jong-chin	8 September 2017	19 June 2020	1015	Independent	William Lai; Su Tseng-chang II
35	Wang Mei-hua	19 June 2020	20 May 2024	1431	Independent	Su Tseng-chang II; Chen Chien-jen
36	J.W. Kuo	20 May 2024	Incumbent	810	Independent	Cho Jung-tai

† Died in office.

== Access ==
The MOEA building is accessible by walking distance West of Guting Station of the Taipei Metro on the Orange Line.

== See also ==
- Executive Yuan
- Economic history of China (1912–49)
- Economy of Taiwan
