= Political divisions of Taiwan (1895–1945) =

Taiwanese administrative divisions under Japanese rule

Taiwan was under Japanese rule after the First Sino-Japanese War, as per the Treaty of Shimonoseki of 1895. There were still several changes until the Japanese political system was adopted in 1920. This system was de facto abolished in 1945 and de jure in 1952.

== Introduction ==
Administrative divisions of Taiwan by types and times. Like the administrative divisions in mainland Japan, most of them are translated to "prefectures" in English.

Number of divisions
| Start date | End date | Timespan | Summary |
|---|---|---|---|
| May 1895 | Aug 1895 | 3 | 3 Ken, 1 Chō |
| Aug 1895 | Mar 1896 | 7 | 1 Ken, 2 Minseishibu, 1 Chō |
| Apr 1896 | Jun 1897 | 15 | 3 Ken, 1 Chō |
| Jun 1897 | Jun 1898 | 12 | 6 Ken, 3 Chō |
| Jun 1898 | Apr 1901 | 34 | 3 Ken, 3 Chō |
| May 1901 | Nov 1901 | 7 | 3 Ken, 4 Chō |
| Nov 1901 | Oct 1909 | 95 | 20 Chō |
| Oct 1909 | Aug 1920 | 130 | 12 Chō |
| Sep 1920 | Jun 1926 | 70 | 5 Shū, 2 Chō |
| Jul 1926 | Apr 1952 | 239 | 5 Shū, 3 Chō |

Types of the divisions
| Name | Kanji | Kana |
|---|---|---|
| Ken | 縣 | けん |
| Shū | 州 | しゅう |
| Chō | 廳 | ちょう |
| Minseishibu | 民政支部 | みんせいしぶ |

== Early years (1895–1901) ==
The political divisions changed frequently between 1895 and 1901.

| Date | May. 1895 – Aug. 1895 | | | Aug. 1895 – Mar. 1896 | | | Mar. 1896 – Jun. 1897 | | |
|---|---|---|---|---|---|---|---|---|---|
| Names | Taihoku Ken | 臺北縣 | たいほくけん | Taihoku Ken | 臺北縣 | たいほくけん | Taihoku Ken | 臺北縣 | たいほくけん |
| Names | Taiwan Ken | 臺灣縣 | たいわんけん | Taiwan Minseishibu | 臺灣民政支部 | たいわんみんせいしぶ | Taichū Ken | 臺中縣 | たいちゅうけん |
| Names | Tainan Ken | 臺南縣 | たいなんけん | Tainan Minseishibu | 臺南民政支部 | たいなんみんせいしぶ | Tainan Ken | 臺南縣 | たいなんけん |
| Names | Hōkotō Chō | 澎湖島廳 | ほうことうちょう | Hōkotō Chō | 澎湖島廳 | ほうことうちょう | Hōkotō Chō | 澎湖島廳 | ほうことうちょう |
| Div. No. | 3 Ken, 1 Chō | | | 1 Ken, 2 Minseishibu, 1 Chō | | | 3 Ken, 1 Chō | | |

| Date | Jun. 1897 – Jun. 1898 | | | Jun. 1898 – Apr. 1901 | | | May. 1901 – Nov. 1901 | | |
|---|---|---|---|---|---|---|---|---|---|
| Names | Taihoku Ken | 臺北縣 | たいほくけん | Taihoku Ken | 臺北縣 | たいほくけん | Taihoku Ken | 臺北縣 | たいほくけん |
| Names | Shinchiku Ken | 新竹縣 | しんちくけん | Taihoku Ken | 臺北縣 | たいほくけん | Taihoku Ken | 臺北縣 | たいほくけん |
| Names | Taichū Ken | 臺中縣 | たいちゅうけん | Taichū Ken | 臺中縣 | たいちゅうけん | Taichū Ken | 臺中縣 | たいちゅうけん |
| Names | Kagi Ken | 嘉義縣 | かぎけん | Taichū Ken | 臺中縣 | たいちゅうけん | Taichū Ken | 臺中縣 | たいちゅうけん |
| Names | Tainan Ken | 臺南縣 | たいなんけん | Tainan Ken | 臺南縣 | たいなんけん | Tainan Ken | 臺南縣 | たいなんけん |
| Names | Hōzan Ken | 鳳山縣 | ほうざんけん | Tainan Ken | 臺南縣 | たいなんけん | Kōshun Chō | 恆春廳 | こうしゅんちょう |
| Names | Giran Chō | 宜蘭廳 | ぎらんちょう | Giran Chō | 宜蘭廳 | ぎらんちょう | Giran Chō | 宜蘭廳 | ぎらんちょう |
| Names | Taitō Chō | 臺東廳 | たいとうちょう | Taitō Chō | 臺東廳 | たいとうちょう | Taitō Chō | 臺東廳 | たいとうちょう |
| Names | Hōko Chō | 澎湖廳 | ほうこちょう | Hōko Chō | 澎湖廳 | ほうこちょう | Hōko Chō | 澎湖廳 | ほうこちょう |
| Div. No. | 6 Ken, 3 Chō | | | 3 Ken, 3 Chō | | | 3 Ken, 4 Chō | | |

== Chō (1901–1920) ==
The former system was abolished 11 November 1901, and twenty local administrative offices (chō) were established. Usage of Ken divisions was discontinued.

=== Structural hierarchy ===
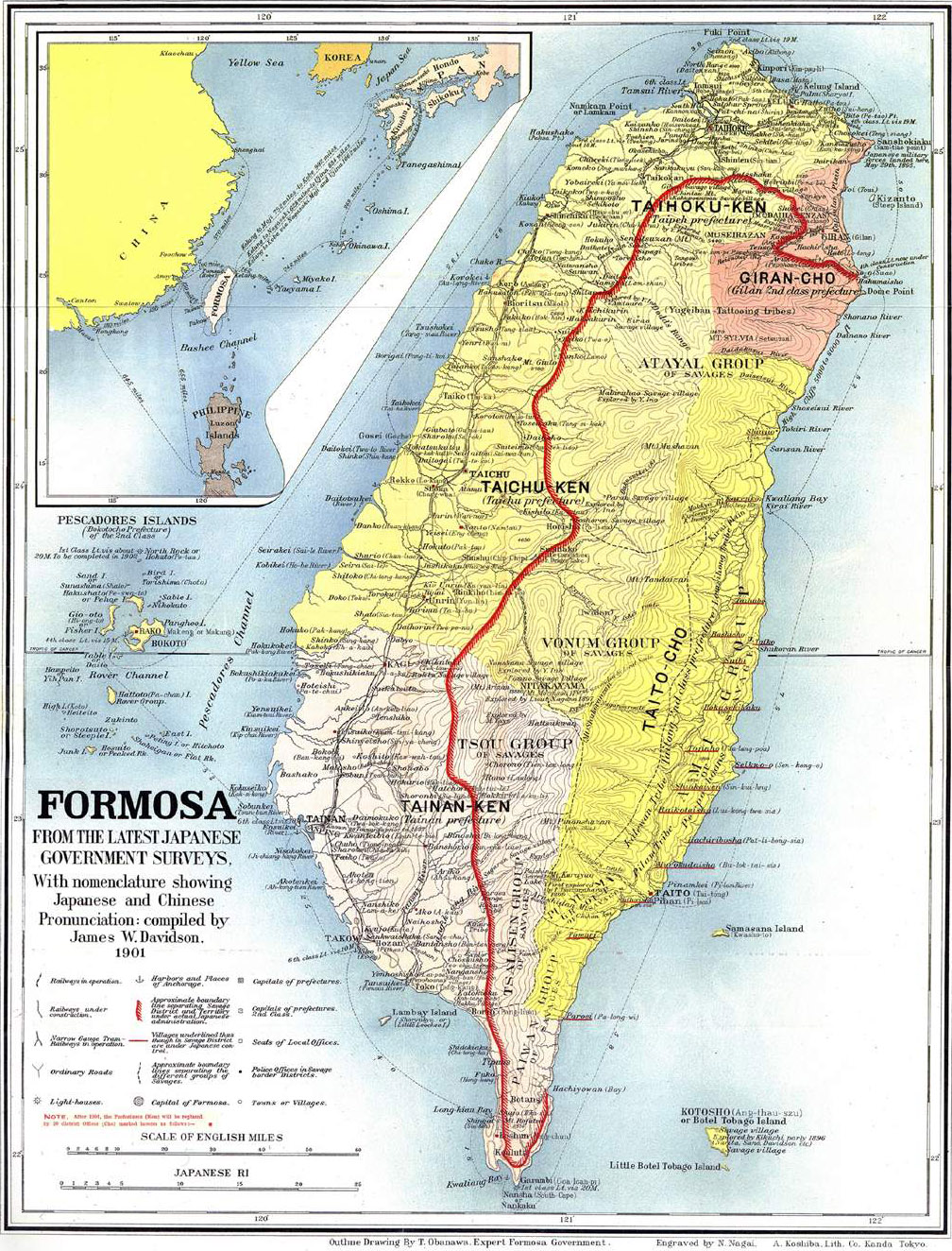
Administrative divisions of Taiwan in 1901. The red line marks the approximate boundary separating Aboriginal areas and territories under actual Japanese administration.

| Level 1 | Level 2 | Level 3 | Level 4 |
|---|---|---|---|
| Prefecture 廳 chō | Subprefecture 支廳 shichō | District 區 ku | Town 街 gai |
| Prefecture 廳 chō | Subprefecture 支廳 shichō | District 區 ku | Village 庄 jō |

=== Prefectures ===
| Nov. 1901 – Oct. 1909 | | | Oct. 1909 – Aug. 1920 | | |
|---|---|---|---|---|---|
| Taihoku Chō | 臺北廳 | たいほくちょう | Taihoku Chō | 臺北廳 | たいほくちょう |
| Kīrun Chō | 基隆廳 | きいるんちょう | Taihoku Chō | 臺北廳 | たいほくちょう |
| Shinkō Chō | 深坑廳 | しんこうちょう | Taihoku Chō | 臺北廳 | たいほくちょう |
| Shinkō Chō | 深坑廳 | しんこうちょう | Giran Chō | 宜蘭廳 | ぎらんちょう |
| Giran Chō | 宜蘭廳 | ぎらんちょう | Giran Chō | 宜蘭廳 | ぎらんちょう |
| Tōshien Chō | 桃仔園廳 | とうしえんちょう | Tōen Chō | 桃園廳 | とうえんちょう |
| Shinchiku Chō | 新竹廳 | しんちくちょう | Shinchiku Chō | 新竹廳 | しんちくちょう |
| Byōritsu Chō | 苗栗廳 | びょうりつちょう | Shinchiku Chō | 新竹廳 | しんちくちょう |
| Byōritsu Chō | 苗栗廳 | びょうりつちょう | Taichū Chō | 臺中廳 | たいちゅうちょう |
| Taichū Chō | 臺中廳 | たいちゅうちょう | Taichū Chō | 臺中廳 | たいちゅうちょう |
| Shōka Chō | 彰化廳 | しょうかちょう | Taichū Chō | 臺中廳 | たいちゅうちょう |
| Nantō Chō | 南投廳 | なんとうちょう | Nantō Chō | 南投廳 | なんとうちょう |
| Toroku Chō | 斗六廳 | とろくちょう | Nantō Chō | 南投廳 | なんとうちょう |
| Toroku Chō | 斗六廳 | とろくちょう | Kagi Chō | 嘉義廳 | かぎちょう |
| Kagi Chō | 嘉義廳 | かぎちょう | Kagi Chō | 嘉義廳 | かぎちょう |
| Ensuikō Chō | 鹽水港廳 | えんすいこうちょう | Kagi Chō | 嘉義廳 | かぎちょう |
| Ensuikō Chō | 鹽水港廳 | えんすいこうちょう | Tainan Chō | 臺南廳 | たいなんちょう |
| Tainan Chō | 臺南廳 | たいなんちょう | Tainan Chō | 臺南廳 | たいなんちょう |
| Hōzan Chō | 鳳山廳 | ほうざんちょう | Tainan Chō | 臺南廳 | たいなんちょう |
| Banshoryō Chō | 蕃薯寮廳 | ばんしょりょうちょう | Akō Chō | 阿緱廳 | あこうちょう |
| Akō Chō | 阿猴廳 | あこうちょう | Akō Chō | 阿緱廳 | あこうちょう |
| Kōshun Chō | 恆春廳 | こうしゅんちょう | Akō Chō | 阿緱廳 | あこうちょう |
| Taitō Chō | 臺東廳 | たいとうちょう | Taitō Chō | 臺東廳 | たいとうちょう |
| Taitō Chō | 臺東廳 | たいとうちょう | Karenkō Chō | 花蓮港廳 | かれんこうちょう |
| Hōko Chō | 澎湖廳 | ほうこちょう | Hōko Chō | 澎湖廳 | ほうこちょう |
| 20 Chō | | | 12 Chō | | |

- Shinkō, Byōritsu, Toroku, Ensuikō were split and merge with the two Chō in the right.

=== Demographics ===
Population of Formosa according to census taken 31 December 1904, arranged by district.

Population of Formosa as of 1915
| Prefecture | Kanji | Japanese | Taiwanese | Area (km²) | Population |
|---|---|---|---|---|---|
| Taihoku | 臺北廳 | Taihoku-chō | Tâi-pak-thiaⁿ | 1,691.5284 | 523,502 |
| Giran | 宜蘭廳 | Giran-chō | Gî-lân-thiaⁿ | 710.8631 | 143,912 |
| Tōen | 桃園廳 | Tōen-chō | Thô-hn̂g-thiaⁿ | 984.5170 | 231,409 |
| Shinchiku | 新竹廳 | Shinchiku-chō | Sin-tek-thiaⁿ | 1,705.1696 | 327,164 |
| Taichū | 臺中廳 | Taichū-chō | Tâi-tiong-thiaⁿ | 2,271.4004 | 592,577 |
| Nantō | 南投廳 | Nantō-chō | Lâm-tâu-thiaⁿ | 1,274.9484 | 126,223 |
| Kagi | 嘉義廳 | Kagi-chō | Ka-gī-thiaⁿ | 3,249.8356 | 566,158 |
| Tainan | 臺南廳 | Tainan-chō | Tâi-lâm-thiaⁿ | 2,345.5133 | 569,292 |
| Akō | 阿緱廳 | Akō-chō | A-kâu-thiaⁿ | 2,201.6170 | 259,441 |
| Taitō | 臺東廳 | Taitō-chō | Tâi-tang-thiaⁿ | 1,204.4906 | 36,997 |
| Karenkō | 花蓮港廳 | Karenkō-chō | Hoa-liân-káng-thiaⁿ | 1,315.7236 | 45,521 |
| Hōko | 澎湖廳 | Hōko-chō | Phêⁿ-ô͘-thiaⁿ | 126.8648 | 57,726 |

== Shū and Chō (1920–1952) ==
Political division of Taiwan

Second level political division of Taiwan Cities / 市 (shi, chhī) Districts / 郡 (gun, kūn) Subprefectures / 支廳 (shichō, chi-thiaⁿ)

Under a "Dōka policy" (同化) in which the Japanese considered the Taiwanese to be separate but equal, the political divisions in Taiwan became similar to the system used in mainland Japan in 1920.

=== Structural hierarchy ===
| Level 1 | Level 2 | Level 3 | Level 4 | Level 5 |
|---|---|---|---|---|
| Prefecture 州 shū (5) 廳 chō (3) | City 市 shi (11) | | 町 chō | 丁目 chōme |
| Prefecture 州 shū (5) 廳 chō (3) | City 市 shi (11) | | 大字 ōaza | 小字 koaza |
| Prefecture 州 shū (5) 廳 chō (3) | District 郡 gun (51) or Subprefecture 支廳 shichō (2) | Town 街 gai (68) | 大字 ōaza | 小字 koaza |
| Prefecture 州 shū (5) 廳 chō (3) | District 郡 gun (51) or Subprefecture 支廳 shichō (2) | Village 庄 jō (197) | 大字 ōaza | 小字 koaza |
| Prefecture 州 shū (5) 廳 chō (3) | District 郡 gun (51) or Subprefecture 支廳 shichō (2) | Aboriginal area 蕃地 banchi | 大字 ōaza | 小字 koaza |
| Prefecture 州 shū (5) 廳 chō (3) | District 郡 gun (51) or Subprefecture 支廳 shichō (2) | Aboriginal area 蕃地 banchi | 社 sha (571) | |

- Chō (町) and chōme (丁目) are used in the city centers.
- Sha (社) is used to name the tribes of the indigenous peoples.

=== Prefectures ===
| Name | Kanji | Kana | No. of Subdivisions | | | Wade–Giles |
| Name | Kanji | Kana | City | Dist. | Subp. | Wade–Giles |
|---|---|---|---|---|---|---|
| Taihoku Prefecture | 臺北州 | たいほくしゅう | 3 | 9 | | Taipei |
| Shinchiku Prefecture | 新竹州 | しんちくしゅう | 1 | 8 | | Hsinchu |
| Taichū Prefecture | 臺中州 | たいちゅうしゅう | 2 | 11 | | Taichung |
| Tainan Prefecture | 臺南州 | たいなんしゅう | 2 | 10 | | Tainan |
| Takao Prefecture | 高雄州 | たかおしゅう | 2 | 7 | | Kaohsiung |
| Karenkō Prefecture | 花蓮港廳 | かれんこうちょう | 1 | 3 | | Hualien Port |
| Taitō Prefecture | 臺東廳 | たいとうちょう | | 3 | | Taitung |
| Hōko Prefecture | 澎湖廳 | ほうこちょう | | | 2 | Penghu |

- Hōko Prefecture was divided from Takao Prefecture in 1926

=== Cities ===
There were 11 cities in Taiwan in 1945. Most of them are still the most populous municipalities in the country today. The ōaza (大字) in the city center may be named chō (町).

| Prefecture | Name | Kanji | Kana | Wade–Giles |
|---|---|---|---|---|
| Taihoku | Taihoku City | 臺北市 | たいほくし | Taipei |
| Taihoku | Kiirun City | 基隆市 | きいるんし | Keelung |
| Taihoku | Giran City | 宜蘭市 | ぎらんし | Yilan |
| Shinchiku | Shinchiku City | 新竹市 | しんちくし | Hsinchu |
| Taichū | Taichū City | 臺中市 | たいちゅうし | Taichung |
| Taichū | Shōka City | 彰化市 | しょうかし | Changhua |
| Tainan | Tainan City | 臺南市 | たいなんし | Tainan |
| Tainan | Kagi City | 嘉義市 | かぎし | Chiayi |
| Takao | Takao City | 高雄市 | たかおし | Kaohsiung |
| Takao | Heitō City | 屏東市 | へいとうし | Pingtung |
| Karenkō | Karenkō City | 花蓮港市 | かれんこうし | Hualien |

=== Demographics ===
The 1941 (Showa 16) census of Taiwan was 6,249,468. 93.33% of the population were Taiwanese which consisted of both Han Taiwanese and "civilized" Taiwanese aborigines. Tainan had the largest population followed by Taichū and Taihoku. The largest concentration of ethnic Japanese were in Taihoku followed by Takao and Tainan.

Demographics of Taiwan as of 1942
| Prefecture | Kanji | Japanese | Taiwanese | Area (km²) | Population | Population Density (/km²) | Demographics | | | | |
| Prefecture | Kanji | Japanese | Taiwanese | Area (km²) | Population | Population Density (/km²) | Japanese national | | | Foreign national | |
| Prefecture | Kanji | Japanese | Taiwanese | Area (km²) | Population | Population Density (/km²) | Taiwanese | Japanese | Korean | Chinese | Other |
|---|---|---|---|---|---|---|---|---|---|---|---|
| Taihoku | 臺北州 | Taihoku-shū | Tâi-pak-chiu | 4,594.2371 | 1,266,924 | 276 | 1,078,316 | 161,306 | 1,161 | 26,138 | 53 |
| Shinchiku | 新竹州 | Shinchiku-shū | Sin-tek-chiu | 4,570.0146 | 856,382 | 187 | 832,565 | 21,632 | 165 | 2,020 | 0 |
| Taichū | 臺中州 | Taichū-shū | Tâi-tiong-chiu | 7,382.9426 | 1,411,846 | 191 | 1,359,865 | 47,688 | 284 | 4,001 | 8 |
| Tainan | 臺南州 | Tainan-shū | Tâi-lâm-chiu | 5,421.4627 | 1,587,513 | 293 | 1,524,123 | 55,389 | 289 | 7,699 | 13 |
| Takao | 高雄州 | Takao-shū | Ko-hiông-chiu | 5,721.8672 | 969,935 | 170 | 896,689 | 65,446 | 585 | 7,214 | 1 |
| Karenkō | 花蓮港廳 | Karenkō-chō | Hoa-liân-káng-thiaⁿ | 4,628.5713 | 167,911 | 36 | 143,671 | 21,811 | 174 | 2,255 | 0 |
| Taitō | 臺東廳 | Taitō-chō | Tâi-tang-thiaⁿ | 3,515.2528 | 97,059 | 28 | 88,317 | 7,687 | 31 | 1,023 | 1 |
| Hōko | 澎湖廳 | Hōko-chō | Phêⁿ-ô͘-thiaⁿ | 126.8642 | 70,312 | 554 | 66,342 | 3,888 | 3 | 79 | 0 |

== Changes in 1945 ==
When the Republic of China began to rule Taiwan in 1945, the government simply changed the names of the divisions, and named the Aboriginal areas.

| Before | | | | | After | | | | |
| Level | Name | Character | Japanese Hepburn | Taiwanese Pe̍h-ōe-jī | Name | Character | Mandarin Pinyin | Taiwanese Pe̍h-ōe-jī | Level |
|---|---|---|---|---|---|---|---|---|---|
| 1 | Prefecture | 州 | shū | chiu | County | 縣 | xiàn | koān | 1 |
| 1 | Prefecture | 廳 | chō | thiaⁿ | County | 縣 | xiàn | koān | 1 |
| 2 | City | 市 | shi | chhī | Provincial city | 市 | shì | chhī | 1 |
| 2 | City | 市 | shi | chhī | County-administered city | 縣轄市 | xiànxiáshì | koān-hat-chhī | 2 |
| 2 | District | 郡 | gun | kūn | County-administered district | 縣轄區 | xiànxiáqū | koān-hat-khu | 2 |
| 2 | Subprefecture | 支廳 | shichō | chi-thiaⁿ | County-administered district | 縣轄區 | xiànxiáqū | koān-hat-khu | 2 |
| 3 | Town | 街 | gai | ke | Urban township | 鎮 | zhèn | tìn | 3 |
| 3 | Village | 庄 | jō | chng | Rural township | 鄉 | xiāng | hiong | 3 |
| 3 | Aboriginal areas | 蕃地 | banchi | huan-tē | Mountain indigenous township | 山地鄉 | shāndì xiāng | soaⁿ-tē hiong | 3 |

- Most of the cities in Taiwan became provincial cities, but Yilan (宜蘭市 Giran) and Hualien (花蓮市 Karen) became the first two county-administered cities in the ROC.
- The more basic 大字 ōaza or 小字 koaza are merged to the districts in provincial cities, and/or reformed to villages (村 cūn or 里 lǐ).

== See also ==
- Administrative divisions of Taiwan
- Administrative divisions of Japan
- Prefectures of Japan
- Governor-General of Taiwan

== Bibliography ==
- Davidson, James W. (1903). "Chapter XXXI: Formosa of To-day". The Island of Formosa, Past and Present : history, people, resources, and commercial prospects : tea, camphor, sugar, gold, coal, sulphur, economical plants, and other productions. London and New York: Macmillan. OCLC 1887893. OL 6931635M.
- Takekoshi, Yosaburō (1907). "Chapter XIII: Population and future development of the island resources". Japanese rule in Formosa. London, New York, Bombay and Calcutta: Longmans, Green, and co. OCLC 753129. OL 6986981M.
