= Administrative divisions of Taiwan =

The Republic of China (Taiwan) is divided into multi-layered statutory subdivisions. Due to the complex political status of Taiwan, there is a significant difference in the de jure system set out in the original constitution and the de facto system in use today.

The Republic of China (ROC) government defines the Taiwan Area (Free Area) as its actual controlled territories, which is constitutionally divided into two provinces and six special municipalities, with each province subdivided into cities and counties. After a constitutional amendment in 1997, the provinces became non-self-governing bodies and remained as nominal divisions under the constitution, with no governing powers. The provincial governments were abolished in 2018. Provincial borders remained for statistical purposes.

With provinces non-functional in practice, Taiwan is divided into 22 subnational divisions (6 special municipalities, 3 cities, and 13 counties), each with a local government led by an elected head and a local council. Special municipalities and cities are further divided into districts for local administration. Counties are further divided into townships and county-administered cities; these divisions have a degree of autonomy with elected leaders and local councils, which share responsibilities with the county governments. Matters for which local governments are responsible or partially responsible include social services, education, urban planning, public construction, water management, environmental protection, transport and public safety.

When the ROC retreated to Taiwan in 1949, its claimed territory consisted of 35 provinces, 12 special municipalities, 1 special administrative region (Hainan) and several autonomous regions (Tibet, reclaimed Mongolia in 1953). However, since its retreat, the ROC has controlled only Taiwan Province and some islands of Fujian Province. The ROC also controls the Pratas Island and Taiping Island in the Spratly Islands, which are part of the disputed South China Sea Islands. They were placed under Kaohsiung administration after the retreat to Taiwan.

Since 1949, the government has made some changes in the area under its control. Taipei became a special municipality in 1967 and Kaohsiung in 1979. The two provincial governments were "streamlined", with their functions transferred to the central government (Fujian in 1956 and Taiwan in 1998). In 2010, New Taipei, Taichung, and Tainan were upgraded to special municipalities. And in 2014, Taoyuan County was also upgraded to Taoyuan special municipality. This brought the top-level divisions to their current state:

According to Article 4 of the Local Government Act, laws pertaining to special municipalities also apply to counties with a population exceeding 2 million. This provision does not currently apply to any county, although it previously applied to Taipei County (now New Taipei City) and Taoyuan County (now Taoyuan City).

== History ==
=== Territory ===
After the end of World War II in 1945, the Republic of China (1912–1949) received Taiwan (Formosa) and Penghu (the Pescadores) from the Empire of Japan. After the Chinese Civil War in 1949, the ROC was reduced to mainly the island of Taiwan and some offshore islands, with the People's Republic of China (PRC) controlling the mainland. However, it continued to formally claim all 35 provinces (including those that no longer form part of the area of the People's Republic of China) in official maps by the ROC government and ignored the changes imposed by the PRC. After 1953, the authorities in Taiwan once claimed that Mongolia was ROC territory, but this claim was abolished under the Chen Shui-bian administration in 2002. By 1967 and 1979, the ROC set up Taipei and Kaohsiung as its special municipalities, with three more added in 2010 and one in 2014. As of 2026, the ROC has not officially renounced claims in mainland China ruled by the CCP, though the ROC has also not recently published official maps depicting mainland China as part of its territory.

This history gives two different sources of the current Taiwanese administrative divisions on the free area of the Republic of China or Taiwan Area.

- Taiwan Province: The island of Taiwan (Formosa) and Penghu (the Pescadores): inherited from the divisions of Taiwan under the Empire of Japan.
- Fuchien Province: Kinmen (Quemoy) and the Matsu Islands – offshore islands inherited from the ROC's Fuchien divisions. The original province was partitioned between the PRC and the ROC following the Battle of Guningtou in 1949. In addition, the ROC still controls over Pratas Island and part of the Spratly Islands in the South China Sea. These were originally part of the Hainan Special Administrative Region, but were transferred to the special municipality of Kaohsiung in 1996. These provinces were streamlined in 1998 and their governments became non-functional in 2019.

=== Changes to divisions ===
See also: 2010 administrative divisions adjustment of Republic of China

In 1945, the ROC replaced the Japanese prefectures with eight counties (Hsinchu, Hualien, Kaohsiung, Penghu, Taichung, Tainan, Taipei, and Taitung) and nine cities (Changhwa, Chiayi, Hsinchu, Kaohsiung, Keelung, Pingtung, Taichung, Tainan, and Taipei). These changes were not recognized by the Allies as they viewed the territory remained under Japanese sovereignty.

On 16 August 1950, a law reorganizing Taiwan Province was passed by the Executive Yuan. In September 1950, the Taiwan Province County and Municipal Administrative District Modification Proposal reorganized Taiwan Province into 16 counties (Changhwa, Chiayi, Hsinchu, Hualien, Ilan, Kaohsiung, Miaoli, Nantou, Penghu, Pingtung, Taichung, Tainan, Taipei, Taitung, Taoyuan, Yunlin) and five cities (Kaohsiung, Keelung, Taichung, Tainan, and Taipei). The ROC also retained control of Kinmen County and Lienchiang County, bringing the total number of administrative divisions to 23.

In 1967, Taipei became a special municipality, separate from Taiwan Province, which gave the central government more direct control of the city. Taipei was followed by Kaohsiung in 1979. In 1982, Hsinchu and Chiayi were separated from their counties to become provincial cities.

Since 1949, the government has made some changes in the area under its control. The two provincial governments were downscaled and much of their functions transferred to the central or county governments. Six special municipalities have been created.

Since 1949, the most controversial part of the political division system has been the existence of Taiwan Province, as its existence was part of a larger controversy over the political status of Taiwan. Since 1998, most of the duties and powers of Taiwan Provincial Government have been transferred to the central government, through amendments to the constitution. The much smaller Fukien province, Fujian Provincial Government has been downsized since 1956.

There has been some criticism of the current administrative scheme as being inefficient and not conducive to regional planning. In particular, most of the administrative cities are much smaller than the actual metropolitan areas, and there are no formal means for coordinating policy between an administrative city and its surrounding areas. The 1980s and 1990s saw proposals to merge Kaohsiung and Taipei cities with their counties of the same name, although these proposals did not end up being implemented.

Before 2008, the likelihood of consolidation was low. Many of the cities had political demographics which were very different from their surrounding counties, making the prospect of consolidation highly politically charged. For example, while the Kuomintang argued that combining Taipei City, Taipei County, and Keelung City into a metropolitan Taipei region would allow for better regional planning, the Democratic Progressive Party argued that this was merely an excuse to eliminate the government of Taipei County, which it had at times controlled, by swamping it with votes from Taipei City and Keelung City, which tended to vote Kuomintang.

On 1 October 2007, Taipei County was upgraded to a quasi-municipality (準直轄市) on the same level as Kaohsiung City and Taipei City. This allowed the county to have the organizational and budgetary framework of a de jure municipality, but it was still formally styled as a county. Taichung County and Tainan City lobbied the central government for similar status. Taoyuan County was also upgraded to a quasi-municipality on 1 January 2011, as its population was above 2 million on the date of elevation.

Under President Ma Ying-jeou's administration, the central government has reorganized more counties and cities. Four mergers and promotions were approved in 2009 and became effective on 25 December 2010 and one more became effective on 25 December 2014.

The summary of changes on administrative divisions are shown below.

Name	Notes
Fuchien Province	The provincial capital was moved from Foochow (Fuzhou) to Jincheng, Kinmen in 1949. The provincial government was downscaled in 1956 and dissolved in 2019.
Taiwan Province	The provincial capital was moved from Taipei to Zhongxing New Village in 1956. The provincial government was downscaled in 1998 and dissolved in 2018.
Kaohsiung City	Formerly a provincial city, elevated to a special municipality in 1979. In 2010, a new Kaohsiung special municipality was established by merging former Kaohsiung County with the existing Kaohsiung City.
New Taipei City	Formerly Taipei County, elevated to a special municipality in 2010.
Taichung City	Elevated to a special municipality by merging Taichung City and Taichung County in 2010.
Tainan City	Elevated to a special municipality by merging Tainan City and Tainan County in 2010.
Taipei City	Formerly a provincial city, elevated to a special municipality in 1967.
Taoyuan City	Formerly Taoyuan County, elevated to a special municipality in 2014.

This brought the top-level divisions of Taiwan (ROC) to its current state: 2 nominal provinces without administrative function and 6 special municipalities; and under the provinces, 13 counties and three cities.

== Current system ==
Overview of administrative divisions of the Republic of China
Republic of China					
Free area (Note: Also known as the Taiwan area or Tai–Min area (Chinese: 臺閩地區; lit. 'Taiwan–Fujian area'))					Mainland area (Note: The mainland area consists of Mainland China, Tibet and (previously) Outer Mongolia)
Special municipalities (Note: Has an elected executive and an elected legislative council.) (Note: Special municipalities, cities, and county-administered cities are all called shi (Chinese: 市; lit. 'city'))		Provinces (Note: Nominal; provincial governments have been abolished)			Not administered (Note: Constitutionally having the same structure as the free area, these are currently under the Chinese Communist Party control with a different structure)
Special municipalities		Counties		Autonomous municipalities (Note: Sometimes called cities (Chinese: 市) or provincial cities (Chinese: 省轄市) to distinguish them from special municipalities and county-administered cities)	Not administered
Districts (Note: Has an appointed district administrator for managing local affairs and carrying out tasks commissioned by superior agency.)	Mountain indigenous districts	County- administered cities	Townships (Note: There are two types of townships: rural townships or xīang (Chinese: 鄉) and urban townships or zhèn (Chinese: 鎮))	Districts	Not administered
Villages (Note: Has an elected village administrator for managing local affairs and carrying out tasks commissioned by superior agency.) (Note: Villages in rural townships are known as cūn (Chinese: 村), those in other jurisdictions are known as lǐ (Chinese: 里))					Not administered
Neighborhoods					Not administered

=== Special municipalities, counties, and cities ===
Currently there are three types and in total 22 administrative divisions are directly governed by the central government (Executive Yuan). According to the Local Government Act of Taiwan, a place with population more than 1.25 million may become a special municipality, a place with population between 0.5 and 1.25 million may become a city. Counties with population more than 2 million may grant some extra privileges in local autonomy that was designed for special municipalities.

Name	Chinese	Pinyin	Pe̍h-ōe-jī	Count
Special municipality	直轄市	zhíxiáshì	ti̍t-hat-chhī	6
County	縣	xiàn	koān	13
City	市	shì	chhī	3

These 22 divisions are also regulated by the Local Government Act as local self-governance bodies. Each division has its own executive called "city/county government" and own legislature called "city/county council". The city mayors, county magistrates and all legislators are elected by the people under its jurisdiction every four years. Geographically,

- Six special municipalities, three provincial cities, and ten counties are on the main island of Taiwan

Special municipalities	Counties		Cities
Kaohsiung City; New Taipei City; Taichung City; Tainan City; Taipei City; Taoyuan City	Changhua County; Chiayi County; Hsinchu County; Hualien County; Miaoli County	Nantou County; Pingtung County; Taitung County; Yilan County; Yunlin County	Chiayi City; Hsinchu City; Keelung City

- Penghu County administers the Penghu Islands.
- Kinmen County administers the Kinmen Islands and the Wuqiu Islands.
- Lienchiang County administers the Matsu Islands.
- Kaohsiung also administers Pratas Island (Tungsha Island or Dongsha Island) and Taiping Island of the South China Sea Islands.

=== Townships, county-administered cities and districts ===
The 22 main divisions in the country are further divided into 368 subdivisions. These 368 divisions can be categorized as the following.

Name	Chinese	Pinyin	Pe̍h-ōe-jī	Administered by	Self-gov.	No.
Mountain indigenous township	山地鄉	shāndì xiāng	soaⁿ-tē hiong	County	Yes	24
Rural township	鄉	xiāng	hiong	County	Yes	122
Urban township	鎮	zhèn	tìn	County	Yes	38
County-administered city	縣轄市	xiànxiáshì	koān-hat-chhī	County	Yes	14
Mountain indigenous district	原住民區	yuánzhùmín qū	gôan-chū-bîn khu	Special municipality	Yes	6
District	區	qū	khu	Special municipality City	No	164

According to the Local Government Act, a county is divided into townships and county-administered cities. The county seat or place with population between 100,000 and 500,000 may become a county-administered city. A special municipality or a city is divided into districts.

The townships, county-administered cities in counties, and mountain indigenous district in special municipalities are also local self-governance bodies. Each division has its own executive called "township/city/district office" and own legislature called "township/city/district council". The city mayors, township/district chiefs and all legislators are elected by the people under its jurisdiction every four years. The normal districts in special municipalities and cities are governed as branches of the municipality/city government and do not hold any local self-governance power.

The mountain indigenous township and districts are created for its significant population of Taiwanese indigenous peoples, in these divisions, only Taiwanese indigenous peoples may be elected to be the township/district chiefs.

=== Lower-level administrative divisions ===
The 368 divisions are further divided into villages and neighborhoods.

Name	Chinese	Pinyin	Pe̍h-ōe-jī	Administered by	No.
Rural village	村	cūn	chhun	Mountain indigenous township Rural township	7,835
Urban village	里	lǐ	lí	Urban township County-administered city Mountain indigenous district District	7,835
Neighborhood	鄰	lín	lîn	Rural village Urban village	147,877

The village chiefs are elected by the people under its jurisdiction every four years. The neighborhood chiefs are appointed by the village chief.

== Other issues ==
=== Joint Service Centers of Executive Yuan ===
The central government operates five regional Joint Service Centers (JSC, 區域聯合服務中心) outside Taipei as outposts of the government ministries in the Executive Yuan, similar to the cross-departmental mode of working in the former Government Offices in England. These regions, laid out the Comprehensive National Spatial Development Plan for Taiwan (臺灣地區國土綜合開發計劃), can be considered a de facto level of government, perhaps equivalent to the English regions or the federal districts of Russia.

Name	Chinese	Date of creation	Service area
Southern Taiwan JSC	南部聯合服務中心	Jun. 1, 1998	Kaohsiung, Penghu, Pingtung
Central Taiwan JSC	中部聯合服務中心	May 14, 2003	Changhua, Miaoli, Nantou, Taichung
Eastern Taiwan JSC	東部聯合服務中心	Sep. 29, 2007	Hualien, Taitung
Yunlin-Chiayi-Tainan JSC	雲嘉南區聯合服務中心	Mar. 27, 2012	Chiayi (city and county), Tainan, Yunlin
Kinmen-Matsu JSC	金馬聯合服務中心	Jan. 18, 2017	Kinmen, Lienchiang

The divisions of northern Taiwan are not covered by any JSC, including Hsinchu (city and county), Keelung, New Taipei, Taipei, Taoyuan and Yilan. They are served directly by the headquarter of Executive Yuan in Taipei.

=== Romanization ===
The romanization used for Taiwanese placenames above the county level is a modified form of Wade–Giles, ignoring the apostrophes and hyphens of the original, thus yielding "Taipei" instead of "T'ai-pei" and "Yilan" instead of "I-lan", for example. Some postal romanizations also exist, like "Keelung" and "Kinmen". In 2002, the ROC adopted Tongyong Pinyin as its national standard for romanization. Most townships and county-administered cities changed their romanization to Tongyong Pinyin at that time. However, some local administrations, like Taipei and Taichung, decided to use Hanyu Pinyin. In 2009, Tongyong Pinyin was replaced by Hanyu Pinyin as the ROC government standard. Currently, most of the divisions are romanized by Hanyu Pinyin system, but some local governments still use Tongyong Pinyin, like Kaohsiung. In 2011, the ROC Ministry of the Interior restored historical romanizations for two towns, Lukang and Tamsui.

== See also ==
- List of administrative divisions of Taiwan
- List of administrative divisions of Fujian
- History of Taiwan
- History of the Republic of China
- Political divisions of Taiwan (1895–1945)
- Provinces of China
- History of the administrative divisions of China (1912–1949)
- Mainland China
- Free area of the Republic of China
- Indigenous Area (Taiwan)
- ISO 3166-2:TW
