= Zhongxing New Village =

Zhongxing 中興新村 Chunghsing
- New Village
- Zhongxing New Village
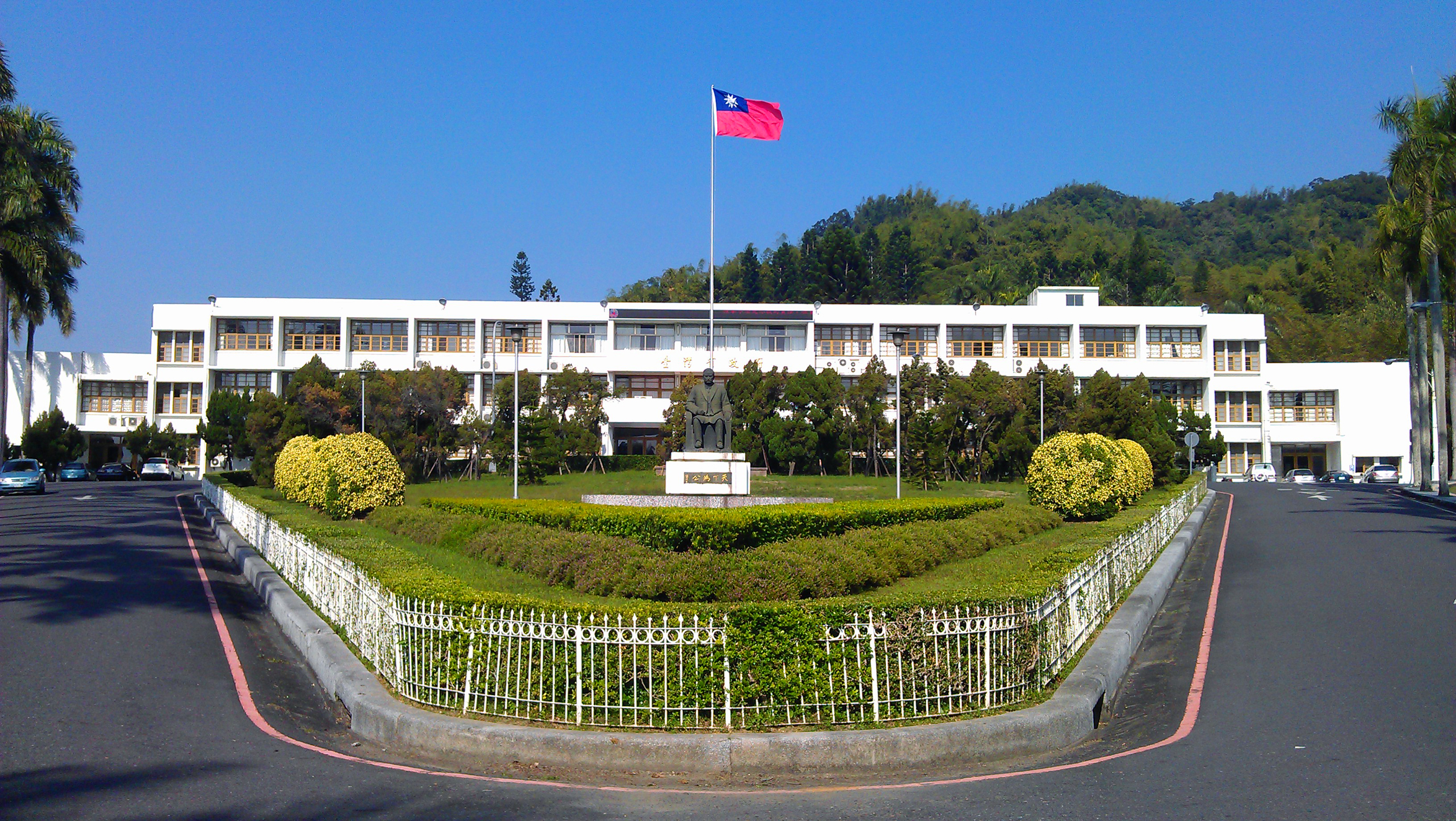
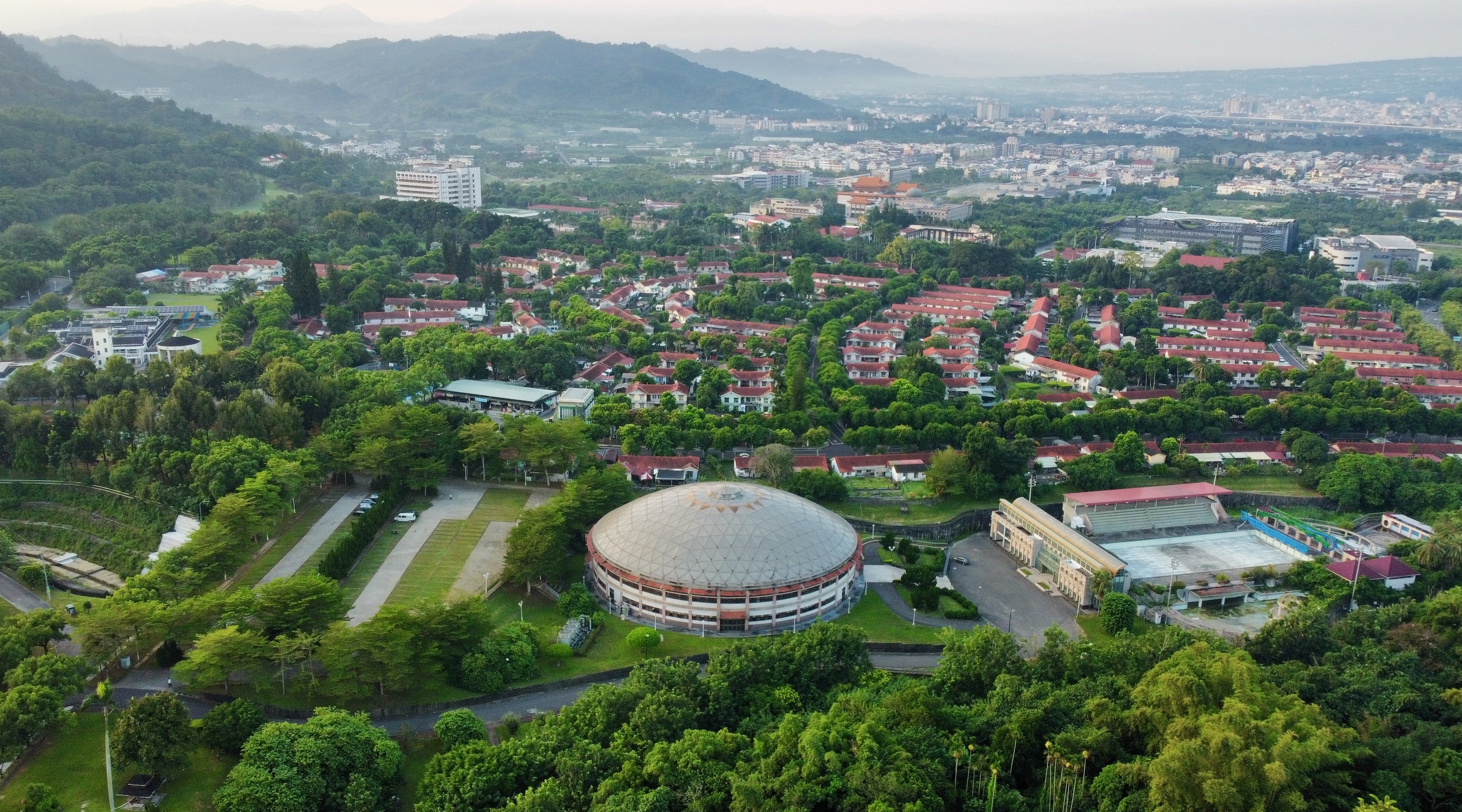
- The building of the Taiwan Provincial Government at Zhongxing New Village and Zhongxing New Village south district
- Interactive map of Zhongxing
- Location in Taiwan
- Coordinates: 23°57′32″N 120°41′13″E
- Country: Republic of China (Taiwan)
- Province: Taiwan^{a}
- County: Nantou
- City: Nantou
- Founded: July 5, 1956
- Time zone: UTC+8 (CST)
- ^{a} In Taiwan, provinces remain a nominal division according to the Taiwanese constitution, but are no longer considered to have any administrative function practically.

Zhongxing New Village
- Traditional Chinese: 中興新村
- Simplified Chinese: 中兴新村
- Postal: Chunghsing
Transcriptions
Standard Mandarin
- Hanyu Pinyin: Zhōngxīng Xīncūn
- Bopomofo: ㄓㄨㄥ ㄒㄧㄥ ㄒㄧㄣ ㄘㄨㄣ
- Wade–Giles: Chung¹-hsing¹ Hsin¹-ts'un¹
- Tongyong Pinyin: Jhongsing Sincun
- MPS2: Jūngshīng Shīntsūn
Hakka
- Romanization: Chûng-hîn Sîn-chhûn
Southern Min
- Hokkien POJ: Tiong-heng Sin-chhun
- Tâi-lô: Tiong-hing Sin-tshun

Zhongxing New Village, sometimes rendered as Chunghsing New Village is an urban village located in Nantou City, Nantou County, Taiwan (ROC) and was the seat of government of Taiwan Province until the abolition of the Taiwan Provincial Government in 2018. The term zhōngxīng is from a Chinese legend Shao Kang Resurgence (少康中興; Shàokāng Zhōngxīng), referring to the restoration of the Xia dynasty by king Shao Kang, an allusion to the ROC government taking back mainland China.

It is a planned town with a population of 25,549 as of February 2010. With all the buildings owned by the government, development is strictly controlled and carefully planned.

== History ==
Taipei, the temporary capital and the seat of government of the Republic of China (Taiwan), was also the capital of Taiwan Province from September 1945 until 1956. Ground was broken on the village on 4 November 1955, and branches of the government began moving on 5 July 1956. The provincial government held its first meeting at Zhongxing New Village on 27 November 1957, and the provincial administration building began use on 1 July 1957.

The People's Republic of China (PRC), which has ruled mainland China since 1949, who also claimed the island of Taiwan, does not recognize the move of the provincial government from Taipei to Zhongxing New Village as legitimate. Thus, the PRC publishes Taipei as the claimed provincial capital on its official maps.

== Research development ==
There are plans for an industrial innovation park to be set up in the planned zone in the city; domestic research institutes have been invited to open innovation and incubation centers there. In addition, a market intelligence technology center is also planned for the development of green intelligence mobile technologies through cloud computing.

The park is scheduled to begin construction after the completion of an environmental impact assessment in 2011. It is estimated to cost NT$10.7 billion (US$367.5 million) to construct, and will house 250 research and development units and provide 13,000 new jobs. No manufacturing activities will be conducted at the park, which will instead focus on emerging and advanced industrial technology.

== See also ==
- Liming New Village
- Taiwan Provincial Government
