= Vehicle registration plates of Taiwan =

Taiwan
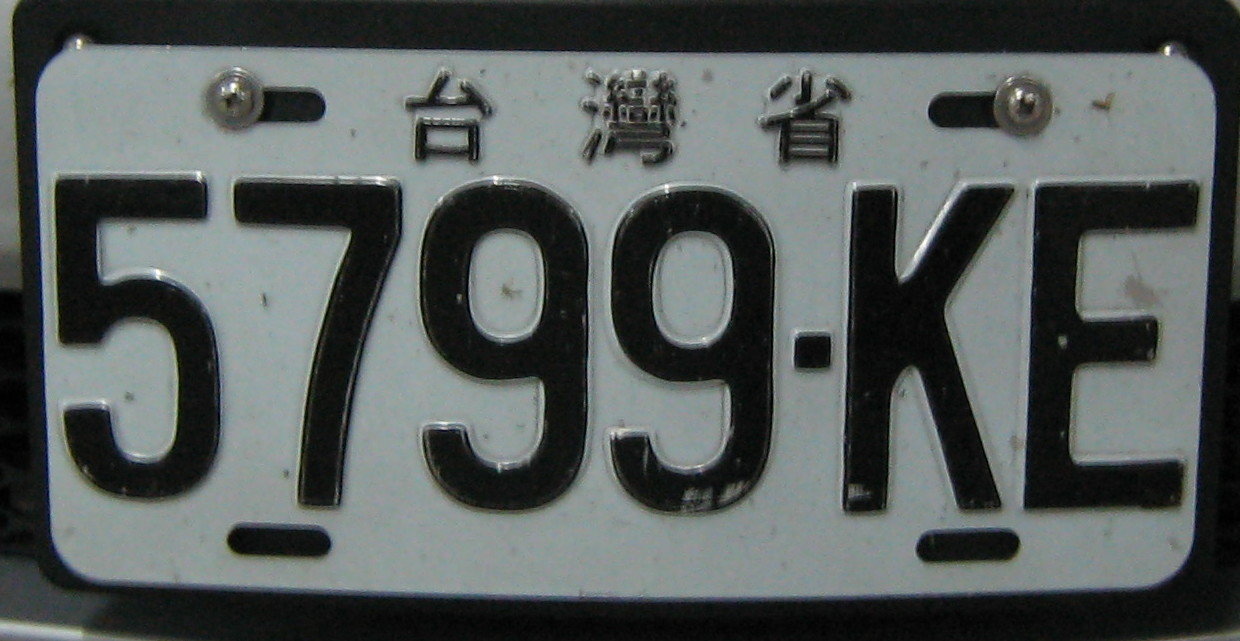
- Taiwanese regular legal standard number plate.
- Country: Taiwan
- Country code: RC

Current series
- Size: 320 mm × 150 mm 12.6 in × 5.9 in
- Colour (front): Black on white
- Colour (rear): Black on white

In Taiwan, all motor vehicles are required to register and display vehicle registration plates issued and managed by the Ministry of Transportation and Communications (MoTC). The plates feature combinations of Latin alphabet (A to Z), Arabic numerals (0 to 9) and dashes (–). Certain special types also incorporate Chinese characters. Unique license plates are issued for imported cars.

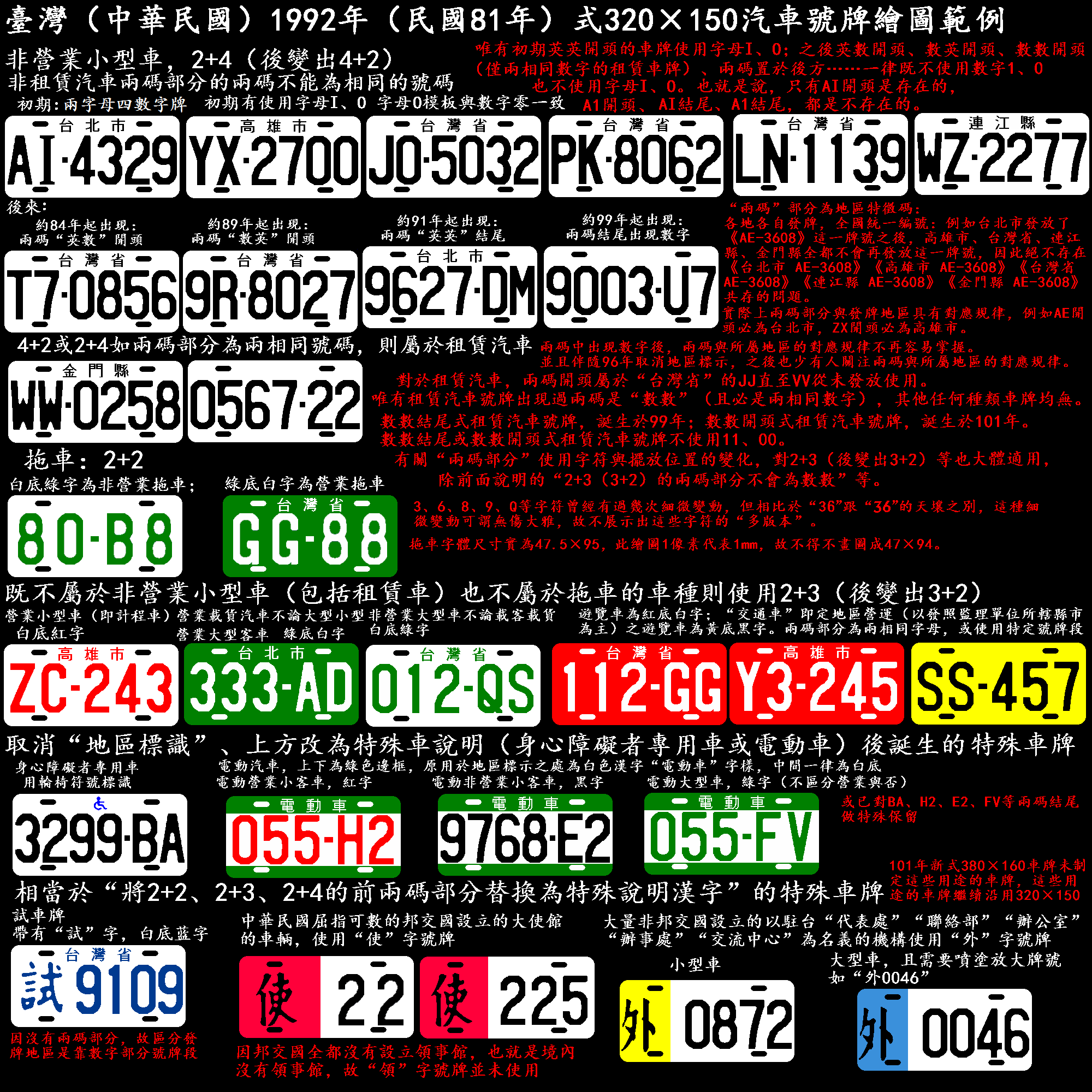
1992 examples of available plates

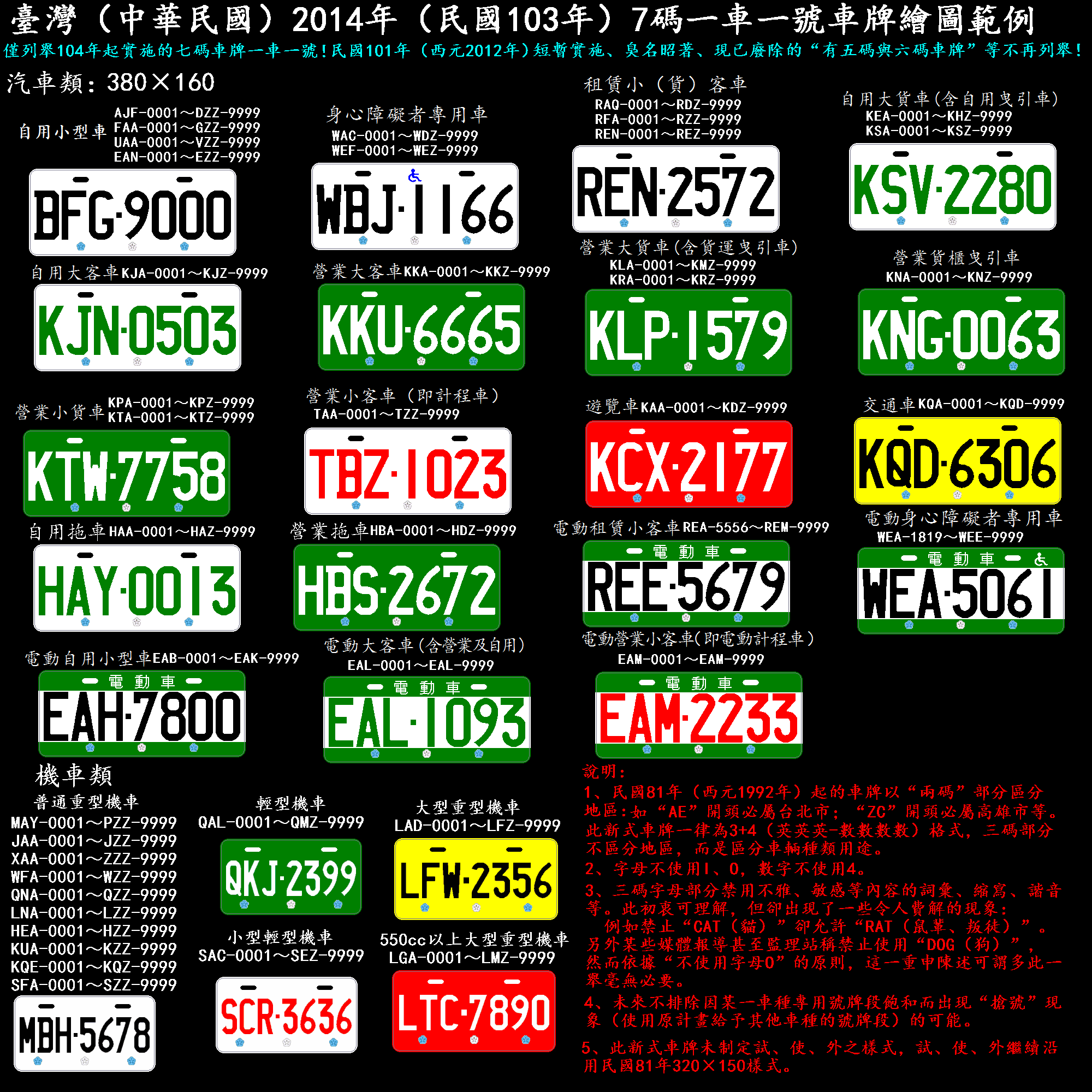
2014 examples of available plates

== Types of number plates ==
Taiwan's current number plate system utilizes Latin letters and Arabic numerals. The various types of number plates include:

| Ordinary vehicles | | | Temporary or testing | | | Special usage | | |
| No. | Name | Chinese | No. | Name | Chinese | No. | Name | Chinese |
|---|---|---|---|---|---|---|---|---|
| 1 | Plate of heavy vehicles | 大型汽車號牌 | 6 | Temporary plate of vehicles | 汽車臨時號牌 | 11 | Plate of embassies | 使字汽車號牌 |
| 2 | Plate of light vehicles | 小型汽車號牌 | 7 | Temporary plate of motorcycles | 機車臨時號牌 | 12 | Plate of consulates | 領字汽車號牌 |
| 3 | Plate of heavy-duty motorcycles | 重型機車號牌 | 8 | Temporary plate of trailers | 拖車臨時號牌 | 13 | Plate of foreign affairs | 外字汽車號牌 |
| 4 | Plate of light-duty motorcycles | 輕型機車號牌 | 9 | Testing plate of vehicles | 汽車試車號牌 | 14 | Plate of power machines | 動力機械牌證 |
| 5 | Plate of trailers | 拖車號牌 | 10 | Testing plate of motorcycles | 機車試車號牌 | | | |

- Note: The plates for military vehicles and agricultural machines are not managed by the MoTC.
- Until 1 January 2007, plates were identified as having been issued under the jurisdiction of either Taiwan Province, Taipei City, Kaohsiung City, Kinmen County or Lienchiang County. Since that time, the legends identifying the place of issuance have been removed— plates display only registration numbers— but the plates are still issued separately by each jurisdiction.
- 1992-Series License Plate is similar to North American plates: The size (320 mm × 150 mm (12.6 in × 5.9 in)) and the format. However it used "Mexico Mode" rather than "US Mode": There is one national numbering system, such that serials are not duplicated in multiple jurisdictions. In Taipei City "AD-3608" is issued but, the other four jurisdiction would not issue the "AD-3608" style anymore. This prevents the problem that two or more jurisdictions would have "AD-3608". License Plate Scanning and Identifying Systems in Taiwan also ignore it. There is a rule for numbering of different jurisdictions, such as "XY-****" can only be issued by Kaohsiung City, "WZ-****" can only be issued by Lienchiang County.

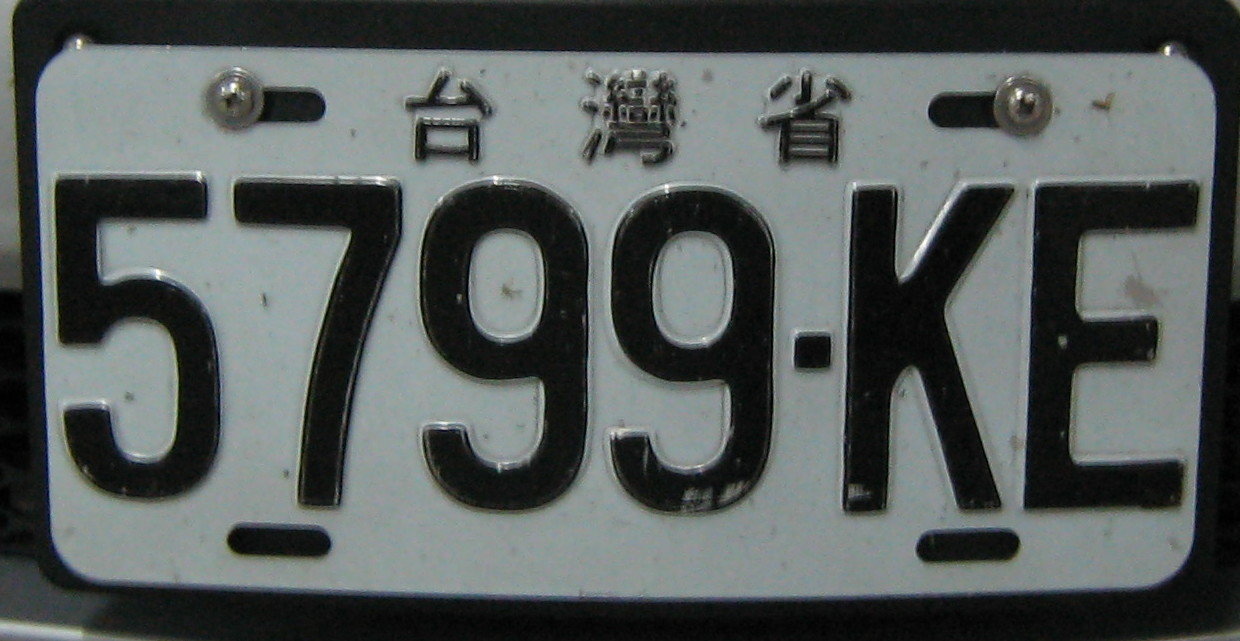
Plates issued prior to 1 January 2007, carried a legend indicating the jurisdiction of issuance—here, Taiwan Province (台灣省).

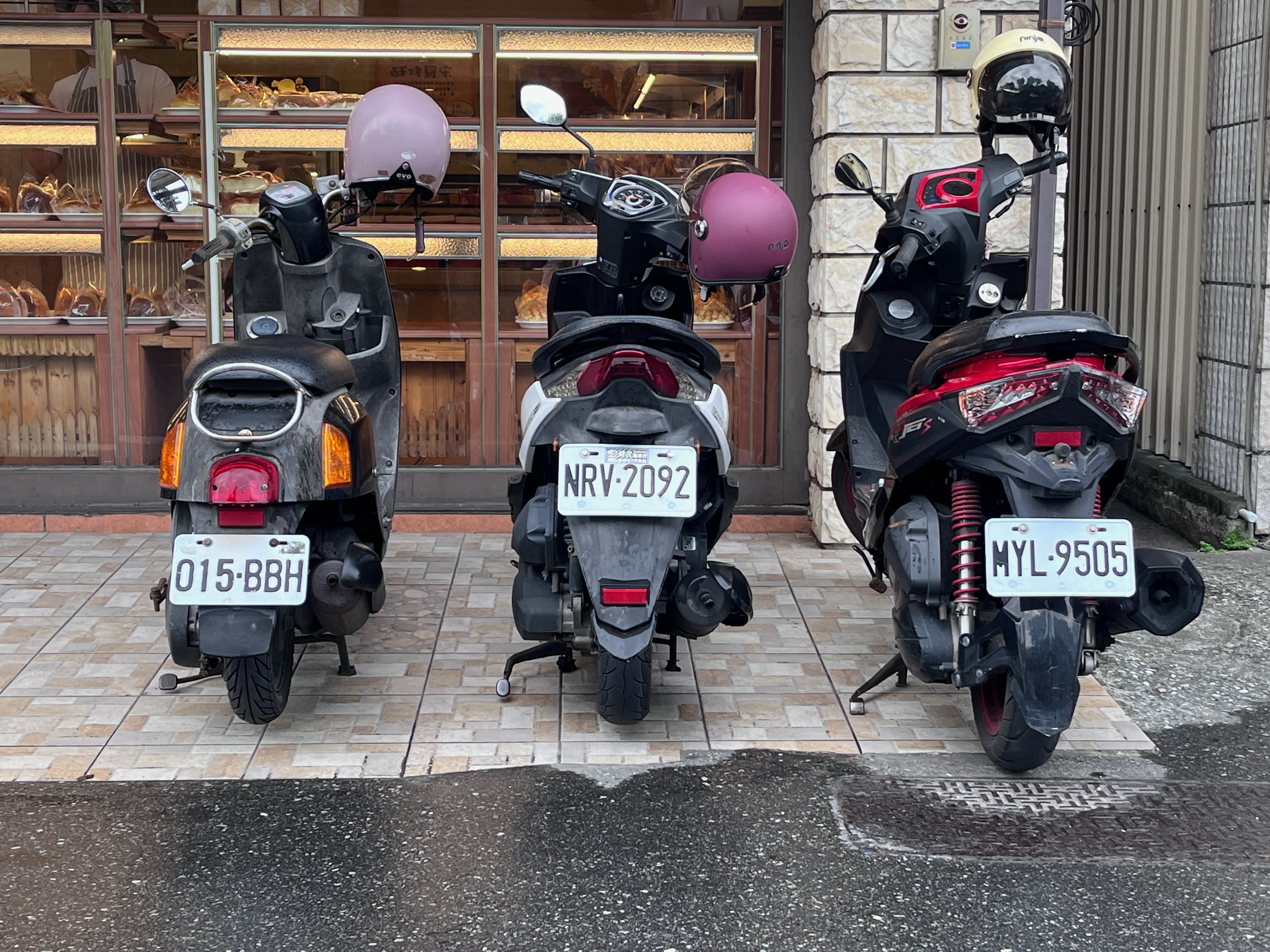
Registration plates on Taiwanese motorcycles.

- On 17 December 2012, the Taiwanese government started issuing new registration plates. The main changes included adding an additional digit and enhancing the security features of the plate. Additionally, the numeral 4 is no longer used, as it is considered unlucky.

== Light vehicles ==
A light vehicle in Taiwan is defined as a motor vehicle with a permissible maximum weight not exceeding 3,500 kg (7,700 lb), and no more than nine seats, including the driver's seat. The plate patterns and their corresponding classes are as follows:

| Pattern 1 | Pattern 2 | Class | Notes |
|---|---|---|---|
| ABC-5678 | AB-0001 0001-AB | Ordinary light vehicles | Private cars or light trucks not used for commercial uses |
| EBC-5678 | AB-0001 0001-AB | Ordinary light electrical vehicles | Private electric cars or light trucks not for commercial uses. These plates have green ridges on the top and bottom sides, with white text "電動車" on the top side. |
| RAA-5678 | AA-6688 8866-AA | Rental light vehicles | Cars or light trucks intended for rental use. |
| REA-5678 | AA-6688 8866-AA | Rental light electrical vehicles | Electric cars or light trucks for rental use featuring green ridges on the top and bottom sides, with white words "電動車" on the top side. |
| WAB-5678 | | Ordinary light vehicles for disabled people | Private cars for disabled people |
| WEA-5678 | | Ordinary light electrical vehicles for disabled people | Private electrical cars for disabled people. This kind of plate has green ridges on the top and bottom sides, with white words "電動車" on the top side. |
| TBC-567 TDA-5678 | YA-001 001-YA | Business light passenger vehicles | Taxis |
| ETC-567 EAM-5678 | YA-001 001-YA | Electrical business light passenger vehicles | Electrical taxis. This kind of plate has green ridges on the top and bottom sides, with white words "電動車" on the top side. |
| QAB-123 KPA-5678 | HA-001 001-HA | Business light trucks | Small trucks and cargo vehicles for commercial uses. The same pattern is also applied to heavy trucks. |

== Heavy vehicles ==
The definition of a heavy vehicle in Taiwan is a motor vehicle having a permissible maximum weight exceeding 3,500 kg (7,700 lb) and/or more than nine seats, including the driver's seat.

| Pattern 1 | Pattern 2 | Class | Notes |
|---|---|---|---|
| PAA-567 KJA-5678 | TA-001 001-SA | Ordinary heavy passenger vehicles | Private buses not for commercial uses |
| AAA-123 KEA-5678 | TA-001 001-SA | Ordinary heavy trucks | Private heavy trucks not for commercial uses |
| CA-123 HAA-5678 | SA-01 01-SA | Ordinary trailers | Coupling with a truck. |
| KAA-123 KAA-5678; JYA-567; PSA-5678 | AA-001 001-AA; DD-001; 001-PP | Business heavy passenger vehicles | Tour buses |
| FAB-123 KKA-5678 | AB-001 001-AB | Business heavy passenger vehicles | Highway buses and city buses |
| LAA-123 KLA-5678; HAA-567 | HA-001 001-HA | Business heavy trucks | Large trucks, cargo vehicles for commercial uses. The same pattern is also applied to light trucks. |
| XA-123 HBA-5678 | XA-01 01-XA | Business trailers | Coupling with a truck. |
| EAA-123 EAL-5678 | 168-FN | Electrical heavy passenger vehicles | Electrical buses for commercial or private uses. This kind of plate has green ridges on the top and bottom sides, with white words "電動車" on the top side. |

== Motorcycles ==
| Pattern 1 | Pattern 2 | Class | Notes |
|---|---|---|---|
| AB-123 LGA-1001 | AA-01 | Large heavy-duty motorcycle | Motorcycles with a cubic capacity exceeding 550 cc (34 cu in), or electric motorcycles with power more than 54 hp (40 kW). |
| LAB-5678 | 001-AAA | Large heavy-duty motorcycle | Motorcycles with a cubic capacity between 250 and 550 cc (15 and 34 cu in), or electric motorcycles with power between 40 and 54 hp (30 and 40 kW). |
| MAB-5678 | AAA-001 001-HAA | Ordinary heavy-duty motorcycle | Motorcycles with a cubic capacity between 50 and 250 cc (3.1 and 15.3 cu in), or electric motorcycles with power between 5 and 40 hp (3.7 and 29.8 kW). |
| QAA-5678 | TAA-001 001-TAA | Ordinary light-duty motorcycle | Motorcycles with a cubic capacity not exceeding 50 cc (3.1 cu in), or electric motorcycles with power between 1.34 and 5 hp (1.00 and 3.73 kW), or electric motorcycles with power not exceeding 1.34 hp (1.00 kW) and top speed more than 45 km/h (28 mph). |
| SAA-5678 | AAA-001 001-AAA | Small light-duty motorcycle | Electric motorcycles with power not exceeding 1.34 hp (1.00 kW) and the fastest speed not exceeding 45 km/h (28 mph). |

== Special use plates ==
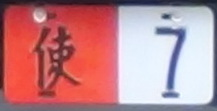

| Pattern | Class | Notes |
|---|---|---|
| 使 001 外 0001 外 0151 | Diplomatic vehicle | For vehicles belonging to the foreign diplomatic missions in Taiwan. |
| 軍A-00001 | Military vehicle | For military uses. |
| 臨A00001 機臨10001 | Temporary plate | Printed on paper, for a vehicles before registration, or vehicles transiting the territory of Taiwan. |
| 試0001 試A0001 試S0001 | Testing | For testing recently manufactured or imported vehicles. |
| 機械ZA-01 | Large heavy power machines | For power machines weighing more than 75 tons. |
| 機械MA-01 | Heavy power machines | For power machines weighing between 42 and 75 tons. |
| 機械AA-01 | Ordinary power machines | For power machines weighing less than 42 tons. |
| A1-0001 | Agricultural machines | Machines for agricultural uses. |

== Banned combinations of characters on registration plates ==
The following table shows the status of the ban on certain combinations of letters and numbers on vehicle registration plates currently in circulation (bold text indicates that the combination has been banned).

| Type | 1992 [Out of I/O with number (example：I2-0001)] | 2012/2014 [Out for I/O/4] | Possible |
|---|---|---|---|
| Profanity | ***-G8** (生殖器) 註：G8-*未禁用, **FOP** (愚蠢), **FUC**, **FUG**, **FUK**, **FUQ**, **FUT** (Fuck), **BC** (白痴), **FK** (Fuck) | **AGG, AGY** (生殖器), **ASS** (屁股) | **TMD** (他媽的), **WTF** (What the fuck) |
| Sex | BJ (口交), BT (變態) | SEX (性) | AV (成人影片), GM (肛門), GT (龜頭), HC (花痴), LP (生殖器), MC (月經), ML (做愛), SJ (射精), SL (色狼), SM (虐戀), TT (保險套), YD (陰道), YJ (陰莖) |
| Gender, occupation and disability discrimination | **IQO** (同IQ0，沒智商), **SEX** (性), **TIT** (乳房) | **GAY** (同志), **ASD** (自閉症) | BRA (女性內衣), NUN (修女, 比丘尼), SJB (神經病) |
| Country or political party abbreviation | **KMT-*** (國民黨) 註：*-KMT未禁用, **PRC** (中華人民共和國) 註：*-PRC未禁用, **ROK** (大韓民國); NP (新黨) | **KMT** (國民黨), **DPP** (民進黨), **FTP** (自由台灣黨) **MKT** (民國黨), **CPA** (國會政黨聯盟), **YSP** (青年陽光黨), **PDF** (人民民主黨), **TSP** (台灣基進黨), **SDP** (社會民主黨), **FHL** (信心希望聯盟) | **CCP** (中國共產黨), **GPT** (綠黨), **NPP** (時代力量), **PFP** (親民黨), **TSU** (台灣團結聯盟), PKK (庫德工人黨) |
| Intelligence agency | **FBI** (美國聯邦調查局), **GPU** (俄羅斯聯邦國家政治保衛局) | (無) | KGB (俄羅斯聯邦國家安全委員會) |
| Racism | **FOE** (敵人), **GOD** (神) | **KKK** (3K黨) | HEZ (真主黨), NAZ (納粹) |
| Animal | **FOX** (狐狸), **HOG**, **PIG**(豬), **PUG** (哈巴狗), **PUP** (小動物) | **ANT** (螞蟻), **APE** (猿) | BUG (蟲子), CAT (貓), DOG (狗) |
| Other | **IO**, **OI** (Similar to the all-numeric format of the fifth generation.), **AC** (閩南語：會死), **LIE** (騙子), **SLY** (奸詐), **SON** (兒子), **SOS** (求救訊號), 原因不明：**POW** (Prisoner of war), **SDX** | **ASS** (屁股), **BAD** (糟糕), **MAD** (瘋子), **SAD** (傷心), **FAT** (肥胖) | BUM (無賴), CKK (死翹翹), LKK (老扣扣), RIP (息止安所), BC (白痴), CD (閩南語：死豬), FK (接近髒話fuck), JC, JS (閩南語：擠死), KC, KS (閩南語：氣死), MP (沒品), WC (廁所), ZT (豬頭), DIE-911 (影射911事件) |
