= Provincial city (Taiwan) =

Type of administrative division of the Republic of China (Taiwan)

Autonomous municipality (Note: In local languages: Traditional Chinese script: 市; Mandarin Pinyin: Shì; Hokkien: Chhī; Sixian Hakka: Sṳ)
- Cities are shown in purple
- Category: Special municipalities, counties, and cities
- Location: Republic of China
- Number: 3 (as of 2019)
- Populations: 267,772–448,207
- Areas: 60–133 km^{2}
- Government: City government; City council
- Subdivisions: District

An autonomous municipality, county-level city or city, previously provincial city, is a de jure second-level administrative division unit in the Republic of China (Taiwan).

The provincial cities were formerly under the jurisdiction of provinces, but the provinces were streamlined and effectively downsized to non-self-governing bodies in 1998, in 2018 all provincial governmental organs were formally abolished. Provincial cities along counties, are presently regarded as de facto principal subdivisions directed by the central government of the ROC.

== History ==
The first administrative divisions entitled "city" were established in the 1920s when Taiwan was under Japanese rule. At this time cities were under the jurisdiction of prefectures. After the World War II, nine (9) out of eleven (11) prefectural cities established by the Japanese government were reform into provincial cities. Their roman spellings are also changed to reflect the official language shift from Japanese to Mandarin Chinese, but characters remain the same.

Spelling changes of provincial cities in 1945
Character	Japanese (before 1945)	Chinese (after 1945)	Character	Japanese (before 1945)	Chinese (after 1945)
臺北	Taihoku	Taipei	嘉義	Kagi	Chiayi
基隆	Kīrun	Keelung	臺南	Tainan	Tainan
新竹	Shinchiku	Hsinchu	高雄	Takao	Kaohsiung
臺中	Taichū	Taichung	屏東	Heitō	Pingtung
彰化	Shōka	Changhua			

The reform was based on the Laws on the City Formation (市組織法) of the Republic of China. This law was passed in the early 20th century. The criteria for being a provincial city included being the provincial capital as well as having a population of over 200,000, or over 100,000 if the city had particular significance in politics, economics, and culture. The division reform in 1945 had some compromises between the Japanese and the Chinese systems, some of the cities with population under the criteria were still be established as provincial cities.

After the government of the Republic of China relocated to Taipei, Taiwan in 1949, the population criterion for provincial cities was raised to 500,000 in the Guidelines on the Implementation of Local Autonomy in the Counties and Cities of Taiwan Province (臺灣省各縣市實施地方自治綱要), which was passed in 1981. It was later raised again to 600,000. Since the streamline of provinces in 1998, provincial cities are all directly under the central government, and are simply referred to as cities.

The People's Republic of China (PRC), which claims Taiwan as its 23rd province, has all of its provincial cities classified as county-level city.

Date	Addition	Removal	No.	Description
1945-10	Changhua, Chiayi, Hsinchu, Kaohsiung, Keelung, Pingtung, Taichung, Tainan, Taipei		9	Reorganised from the prefecture-administered cities in the period under Japanese rule.
1950-08-16		Chiayi	8	Downgraded to a county-administered city
1951-12-01		Changhua, Hsinchu, Pingtung	5	Downgraded to county-administered cities
1967-07-01		Taipei	4	Upgraded to a special municipality
1979-07-01		Kaohsiung	3	Upgraded to a special municipality
1982-07-01	Chiayi, Hsinchu		5	Upgraded from county-administered cities
2010-12-25		Taichung, Tainan	3	Merge with Taichung County and Tainan County, and upgraded to special municipalities
Current cities: Chiayi, Hsinchu, Keelung (3).

== Current cities ==
Currently, the Local Government Act of the Ministry of the Interior applies for the creation of a city, in which a city needs to have a population between 500,000 and 1,250,000 and occupies major political, economical and cultural roles. Note that all three existing cities are not qualified for the population test, they were built for historical reasons.

There are currently three cities, all in Taiwan Province:

Name	Chinese	Hànyǔ Pīnyīn	Wade–Giles	Tongyòng Pinyin	Hokkien Pe̍h-ōe-jī	Hakka Pha̍k-fa-sṳ	Area	City Seat		Establishment
Chiayi	嘉義市	Jiāyì	Chia¹-i⁴	Jiayì	Ka-gī	Kâ-ngi	60.03 km^{2}	East District	東區	1982-07-01
Hsinchu	新竹市	Xīnzhú	Hsin¹-chu²	Sinjhú	Sin-tek	Sîn-chuk	104.10 km^{2}	North District	北區	1982-07-01
Keelung	基隆市	Jīlóng	Chi¹-lung²	Jilóng	Ke-lâng	Kî-lùng	132.76 km^{2}	Zhongzheng District	中正區	1945-10-25

Their self-governed bodies (executive and legislature) regulated by the Local Government Act are:

Name	Executive			Legislature	
Name	Government	Mayor	Current Mayor	City Council	No. of seats
Chiayi	Chiayi City Government	Mayor of Chiayi	Huang Min-hui	Chiayi City Council	24
Hsinchu	Hsinchu City Government	Mayor of Hsinchu	Ann Kao	Hsinchu City Council	33
Keelung	Keelung City Government	Mayor of Keelung	George Hsieh	Keelung City Council	32

== See also ==
- Cities of Japan
- Political divisions of Taiwan (1895–1945)
- Prefecture-level city of China

Overview of administrative divisions of the Republic of China
Republic of China
Free area (Note: Also known as the Taiwan area or Tai–Min area (Chinese: 臺閩地區; lit. 'Taiwan–Fujian area'))					Mainland area (Note: The mainland area consists of Mainland China, Tibet and (previously) Outer Mongolia)
Special municipalities (Note: Has an elected executive and an elected legislative council.) (Note: Special municipalities, cities, and county-administered cities are all called shi (Chinese: 市; lit. 'city'))		Provinces (Note: Nominal; provincial governments have been abolished)			Not administered (Note: Constitutionally having the same structure as the free area, these are currently under the Chinese Communist Party control with a different structure)
Special municipalities		Counties		Autonomous municipalities (Note: Sometimes called cities (Chinese: 市) or provincial cities (Chinese: 省轄市) to distinguish them from special municipalities and county-administered cities)	Not administered
Districts (Note: Has an appointed district administrator for managing local affairs and carrying out tasks commissioned by superior agency.)	Mountain indigenous districts	County- administered cities	Townships (Note: There are two types of townships: rural townships or xīang (Chinese: 鄉) and urban townships or zhèn (Chinese: 鎮))	Districts	Not administered
Villages (Note: Has an elected village administrator for managing local affairs and carrying out tasks commissioned by superior agency.) (Note: Villages in rural townships are known as cūn (Chinese: 村), those in other jurisdictions are known as lǐ (Chinese: 里))					Not administered
Neighborhoods					Not administered
