= County-administered city =

Administrative division of Taiwan

Special municipalities Cities County-administered cities

A county-administered city (Note: In local languages: Traditional Chinese script: 縣轄市; Mandarin Pinyin: Xiànxiáshì; Hokkien: Koān-hat-chhī) is a third-level administrative division in the Republic of China (Taiwan), below a county, which is in turn below a province. Under the administrative structure of the ROC, it is at the same level as a township or a district. Such cities are under the jurisdiction of counties. It is also the lowest-level city in Taiwan, below a city and a special municipality. There are 14 county-administered cities currently under ROC control.

== History ==
The first administrative divisions entitled "city" were established in the 1920s when Taiwan was under Japanese rule. At this time cities were under the jurisdiction of prefectures. After the World War II, nine (9) out of eleven (11) prefectural cities established by the Japanese government were reorganized into provincial cities based on the Laws on the City Formation (市組織法).

However, the populations of Hualien (Karenkō) and Yilan (Giran) were too low to become a provincial city, but they were of more importance than urban townships. Thus the Scheme on the Local Rules in Various Counties and Cities of Taiwan Province (臺灣省各縣市實施地方自治綱要) provided for the creation of county-administered cities along with urban townships and rural townships.

Spelling changes of provincial cities in 1945
County-administered cities formed in 1945			County-administered cities formed in 1951		
Character	Japanese (before 1945)	Chinese (after 1945)	Character	Japanese (before 1945)	Chinese (after 1945)
宜蘭	Giran	Yilan	新竹	Shinchiku	Hsinchu
花蓮(港)	Karenkō	Hualien	彰化	Shōka	Changhua
			嘉義	Kagi	Chiayi
			屏東	Heitō	Pingtung

In 1951, a large scale administrative division reorganization took place in Taiwan. The size of counties shrink and the county-administered districts were abolished. This puts county-administered cities and townships into the same level in the hierarchy. Four provincial cities were also downgraded to county-administered cities after this reorganization. Since county-administered cities are based on the law for Taiwan Province, Kinmen and Lienchiang Counties of Fukien Province do not have any city under their jurisdiction.

The population criterion was originally 50,000 in the 1940s, but was raised to 100,000 in 1959, again in 1977 to 150,000, and in 2015 it was lower back to 100,000. Under the current. Currently, the Local Government Act regulates the creation of a county-administered city, in which a city needs to have a population between 100,000 and 500,000 and occupies major political, economical and cultural roles. Not all existing county-administered cities are qualified for the population test, they were built for historical reasons.

== Current county-administered cities ==
There are currently fourteen (14) county-administered cities, all in Taiwan Province:

Name	Chinese	Hanyu Pinyin	Wade–Giles	Tongyong Pinyin	Hokkien Pe̍h-ōe-jī	Hakka Pha̍k-fa-sṳ	County	Establishment
Changhua	彰化市	Zhānghuà	Chang¹-hua⁴	Jhanghuà	Chiong-hòa or Chiang-hòa	Chông-fa	Changhua	1951-12-01
Douliu	斗六市	Dǒuliù	Tou³-liu⁴	Dǒuliòu	Táu-la̍k	Téu-liuk	Yunlin	1981-12-25
Hualien	花蓮市	Huālián	Hua¹-lien²	Hualián	Hoa-lian or Hoa-liân	Fâ-lièn	Hualien	1946-01-16
Magong	馬公市	Mǎgōng	Ma³-kung¹	Mǎgong	Má-keng	Mâ-kûng	Penghu	1981-12-25
Miaoli	苗栗市	Miáolì	Miao²-li⁴	Miáolì	Biâu-le̍k or Miâu-le̍k	Mèu-li̍t	Miaoli	1981-12-25
Nantou	南投市	Nántóu	Nan²-tʻou²	Nántóu	Lâm-tâu	Nàm-thèu	Nantou	1981-12-25
Pingtung	屏東市	Píngdōng	Pʻing²-tung¹	Píngdong	Pîn-tong	Phìn-tûng	Pingtung	1951-12-01
Puzi	朴子市	Púzǐ	Pʻu²-tzŭ³	Púzǐh	Phò-chú	Phú-chṳ́	Chiayi	1992-09-10
Taibao	太保市	Tàibǎo	Tʻai⁴-pao³	Tàibǎo	Thài-pó	Thai-pó	Chiayi	1991-07-01
Taitung	臺東市	Táidōng	Tʻai²-tung¹	Táidong	Tâi-tang	Thòi-tûng	Taitung	1976-01-01
Toufen	頭份市	Tóufèn	Tʻou²-fên⁴	Tóufèn	Thâu-hūn	Thèu-fun	Miaoli	2015-10-05
Yilan	宜蘭市	Yílán	I²-lan²	Yílán	Gî-lân	Ngì-làn	Yilan	1946-01-16
Yuanlin	員林市	Yuánlín	Yüan²-lin²	Yuánlín	Oân-lîm	Yèn-lìm	Changhua	2015-08-08
Zhubei	竹北市	Zhúběi	Chu²-pei³	Jhúběi	Tek-pak	Chuk-pet	Hsinchu	1988-10-31

Each county-administered city has its own local self-government bodies as stipulated in the Local Government Act: a city office (市公所) and a city council (市民代表大會). The mayor (市長) and members of the city council (市民代表) are elected by the residents of the city. A county-administered city is further divided into urban villages (里).

== Timeline ==
Below, unless noted otherwise in parentheses, the newly created cities were towns that exceeded the 150,000 criteria.

Date	Addition	Removal	No.	Description
1946–01	Hualien; Yilan		2	Reorganized from the prefectural cities (州轄市; Zhōuxiá Shì) in the period under Japanese rule.
1950-08-16	Chiayi		3	Downgraded from provincial city (省轄市; Shěngxiá Shì).
1951-12-01	Changhua; Hsinchu; Pingtung		6	Downgraded from provincial city (省轄市; Shěngxiá Shì).
1962-04-01	Sanchong		7	The population requirement of county-administered cities is set to 100,000. Originally urban township (鎮; Zhèn).
1967-07-01	Zhongli		8	Originally urban township (鎮; Zhèn).
1971-04-21	Taoyuan		9	Originally urban township (鎮; Zhèn).
1972-07-01	Banqiao; Fengshan		11	Originally urban township (鎮; Zhèn).
1976-01-01	Taitung		12	Originally urban township (鎮; Zhèn).
1976-03-01	Fengyuan		13	Originally urban township (鎮; Zhèn).
1979-01-01	Yonghe; Zhonghe		15	The population requirement of county-administered cities changed to 150,000. [Yonghe] Originally urban township (鎮; Zhèn). [Zhonghe] Originally rural township (鄉; Xiāng).
1980-01-15	Xindian; Xinzhuang		17	Originally urban townships (鎮; Zhèn).
1981-12-25	Douliu; Magong; Miaoli; Nantou; Xinying		22	All county seats in Taiwan Province were upgraded from urban township (鎮 Zhèn) to county-administered cities.
1982-07-01		Chiayi; Hsinchu	20	Upgraded to provincial cities (省轄市; Shěngxiá Shì).
1988-10-31	Zhubei		21	Originally rural township (鄉; Xiāng), county seat.
1991-07-01	Taibao		22	Originally rural township (鄉; Xiāng), county seat.
1992-03-01	Pingzhen		23	Originally rural township (鄉; Xiāng).
1992-09-10	Puzi		24	Originally rural township (鄉; Xiāng), county seat.
1993-05-01	Yongkang		25	Originally rural township (鄉; Xiāng).
1993-06-26	Tucheng		26	Originally rural township (鄉; Xiāng).
1993-11-01	Dali		27	Originally rural township (鄉; Xiāng).
1995-01-01	Bade		28	Originally rural township (鄉; Xiāng).
1996-08-01	Taiping		29	Originally rural township (鄉; Xiāng).
1997-10-06	Luzhou		30	Originally rural township (鄉; Xiāng).
1999-07-01	Xizhi		31	Originally urban township (鎮; Zhèn).
1999-10-04	Shulin		32	Originally urban township (鎮; Zhèn).
2010-08-01	Yangmei		33	Originally urban township (鎮; Zhèn).
2010-12-25		Banqiao; Dali; Fengshan; Fengyuan; Luzhou; Sanchong; Shulin; Taiping; Tucheng; Xindian; Xinying; Xinzhuang; Xizhi; Yonghe; Yongkang; Zhonghe	17	New special municipalities established in Taipei County, Taichung, Tainan, and Kaohsiung; all county-administered cities in such places were upgraded into districts (區; Qū).
2014-06-03	Luzhu		18	Originally rural township (鄉; Xiāng).
2014-12-25		Bade; Luzhu; Pingzhen; Taoyuan; Yangmei; Zhongli	12	New special municipality established in Taoyuan County; all county-administered cities in such places were upgraded into districts (區; Qū).
2015-08-08	Yuanlin		13	The population requirement of county-administered cities changed to 100,000. Originally urban township (鎮; Zhèn).
2015-10-05	Toufen		14	Originally urban township (鎮; Zhèn).

== Populous townships ==
Townships with population more than 90,000, close to the upgrading criterion (as of March 2017)

- Caotun (草屯鎮; 98,330)
- Zhudong (竹東鎮; 96,877)
- Hemei (和美鎮; 91,159)

== See also ==
- Administrative divisions of Taiwan
- Political divisions of Taiwan (1895–1945)
- County-level city (Mainland China)

Overview of administrative divisions of the Republic of China
Republic of China
Free area (Note: Also known as the Taiwan area or Tai–Min area (Chinese: 臺閩地區; lit. 'Taiwan–Fujian area'))					Mainland area (Note: The mainland area consists of Mainland China, Tibet and (previously) Outer Mongolia)
Special municipalities (Note: Has an elected executive and an elected legislative council.) (Note: Special municipalities, cities, and county-administered cities are all called shi (Chinese: 市; lit. 'city'))		Provinces (Note: Nominal; provincial governments have been abolished)			Not administered (Note: Constitutionally having the same structure as the free area, these are currently under the Chinese Communist Party control with a different structure)
Special municipalities		Counties		Autonomous municipalities (Note: Sometimes called cities (Chinese: 市) or provincial cities (Chinese: 省轄市) to distinguish them from special municipalities and county-administered cities)	Not administered
Districts (Note: Has an appointed district administrator for managing local affairs and carrying out tasks commissioned by superior agency.)	Mountain indigenous districts	County- administered cities	Townships (Note: There are two types of townships: rural townships or xīang (Chinese: 鄉) and urban townships or zhèn (Chinese: 鎮))	Districts	Not administered
Villages (Note: Has an elected village administrator for managing local affairs and carrying out tasks commissioned by superior agency.) (Note: Villages in rural townships are known as cūn (Chinese: 村), those in other jurisdictions are known as lǐ (Chinese: 里))					Not administered
Neighborhoods					Not administered
