= Village (Taiwan) =

Administrative subdivisions of the Republic of China

Villages are the basic level administrative subdivisions of the Republic of China, under townships, county-administered cities or districts. There are two types of villages depending on the divisions it belongs to.

Name	Chinese	Mandarin pinyin	Taiwanese Pe̍h-ōe-jī	Administered by
Urban village	里	lǐ	lí	Urban township, County-administered city, District, Mountain indigenous district
Rural village	村	cūn	chhun	Rural township, Mountain indigenous township

== Structuring and sizing ==
The history of villages in Taiwan could date back to the Hoko system in the Japanese era, which ho (保) changed into village after the Republic of China took control of Taiwan. The formation of a village helps divide areas into considerations for transportation and city planning. The formation of the village and its size depend largely on the county it is located in or the population nature of the local area.

In counties or districts with a limited population, 100 households could form a village, whereas in densely populated New Taipei, 1,000 households are necessary to form a village. In very densely populated areas, a village could comprise a population of up to 4,000 households. Thus, the size of villages varies widely.

The following are the statistics of villages in each provincial-level division in June 2018.

Province/Municipality	Township-level divisions	Village-level divisions	Types of villages	
Province/Municipality	Township-level divisions	Village-level divisions	Urban	Rural
Fuchien Province	10	59	24	35
Kaohsiung City	38	891	891	0
New Taipei City	29	1032	1032	0
Taichung City	29	625	625	0
Tainan City	37	649	649	0
Taipei City	12	456	456	0
Taiwan Province	200	3545	1695	1850
Taoyuan City	13	504	504	0
Total	368	7761	5876	1885

== Head ==
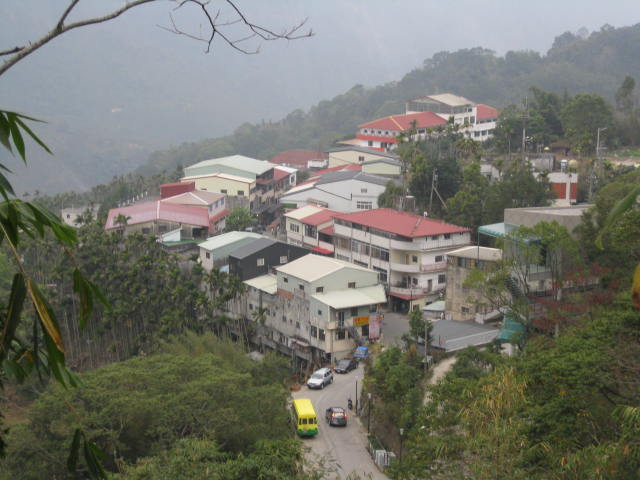
Caoling Village in Gukeng Township, Yunlin County

The head of a village is elected by the people of the village every four years, the head is subsidized with NT$45,000 per month for local transportation, stationary, postage and bill fees.

The head of a village holds responsibility to initiate and hold meetings, handout certificates of various sorts, encourage bill payments and assist filling out of government documents if required.

== See also ==
- Administrative divisions of Taiwan
- Grid-style social management in China

Overview of administrative divisions of the Republic of China
Republic of China
Free area (Note: Also known as the Taiwan area or Tai–Min area (Chinese: 臺閩地區; lit. 'Taiwan–Fujian area'))					Mainland area (Note: The mainland area consists of Mainland China, Tibet and (previously) Outer Mongolia)
Special municipalities (Note: Has an elected executive and an elected legislative council.) (Note: Special municipalities, cities, and county-administered cities are all called shi (Chinese: 市; lit. 'city'))		Provinces (Note: Nominal; provincial governments have been abolished)			Not administered (Note: Constitutionally having the same structure as the free area, these are currently under the Chinese Communist Party control with a different structure)
Special municipalities		Counties		Autonomous municipalities (Note: Sometimes called cities (Chinese: 市) or provincial cities (Chinese: 省轄市) to distinguish them from special municipalities and county-administered cities)	Not administered
Districts (Note: Has an appointed district administrator for managing local affairs and carrying out tasks commissioned by superior agency.)	Mountain indigenous districts	County- administered cities	Townships (Note: There are two types of townships: rural townships or xīang (Chinese: 鄉) and urban townships or zhèn (Chinese: 鎮))	Districts	Not administered
Villages (Note: Has an elected village administrator for managing local affairs and carrying out tasks commissioned by superior agency.) (Note: Villages in rural townships are known as cūn (Chinese: 村), those in other jurisdictions are known as lǐ (Chinese: 里))					Not administered
Neighborhoods					Not administered
