= Taiwan (Republic of China province) =

Province of the Republic of China

Taiwan 臺灣省
- Province

Name transcription(s)
  - Chinese: 臺灣省 (Táiwān Shěng)
  - Abbreviation: TW / 臺 (pinyin: Tái; Hokkien: Tâi; Hakka: Thòi)
  - Hokkien POJ: Tâi-oân-séng
  - Hakka PFS: Thòi-vàn-sén or Thòi-vân-sén
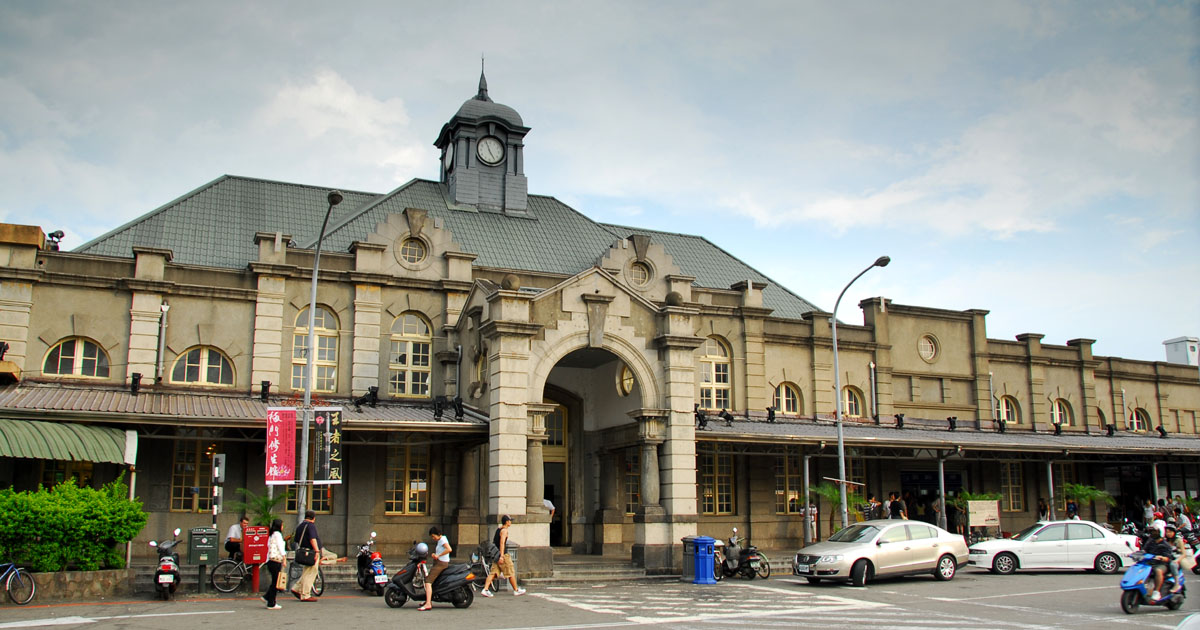
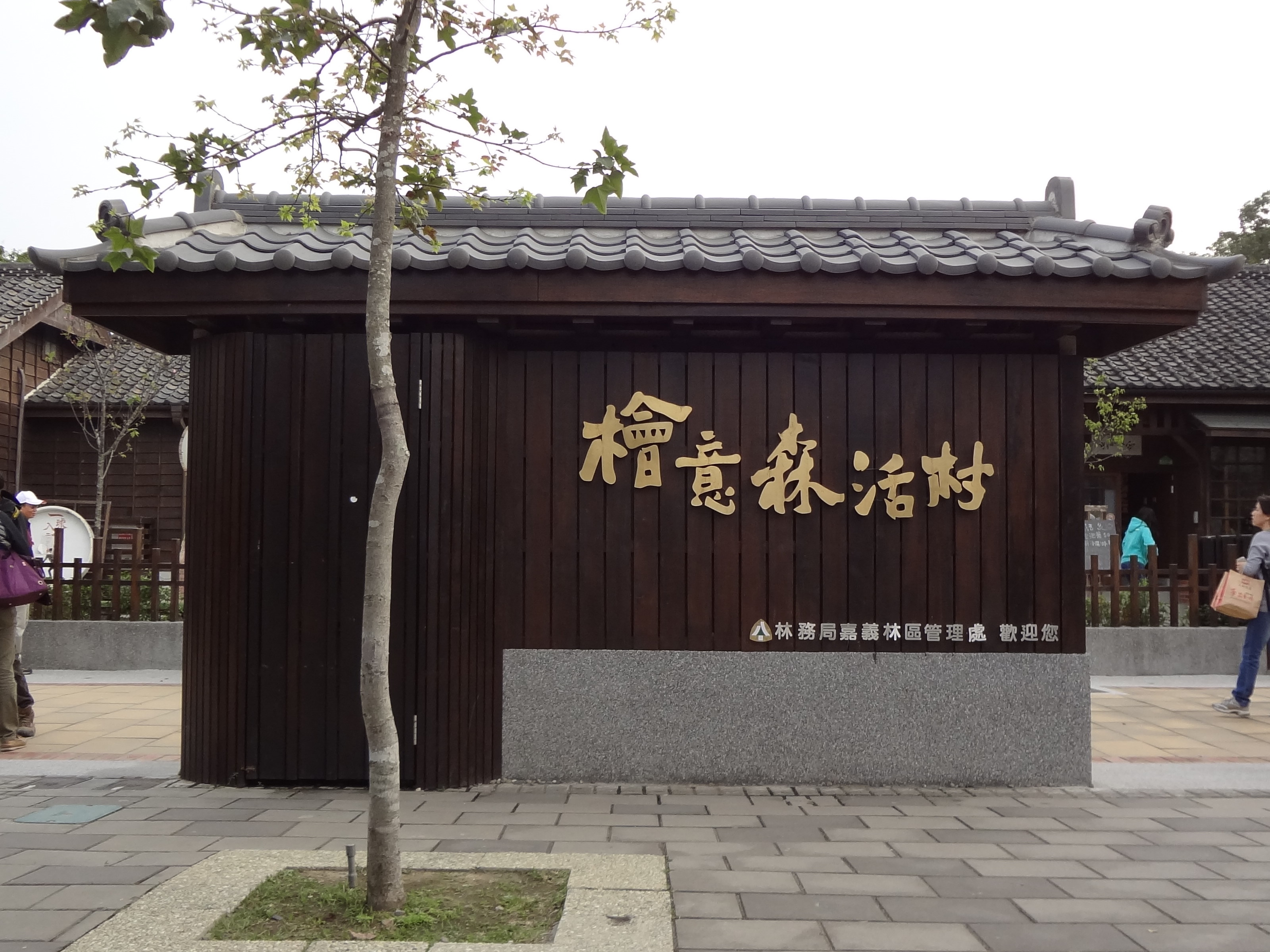
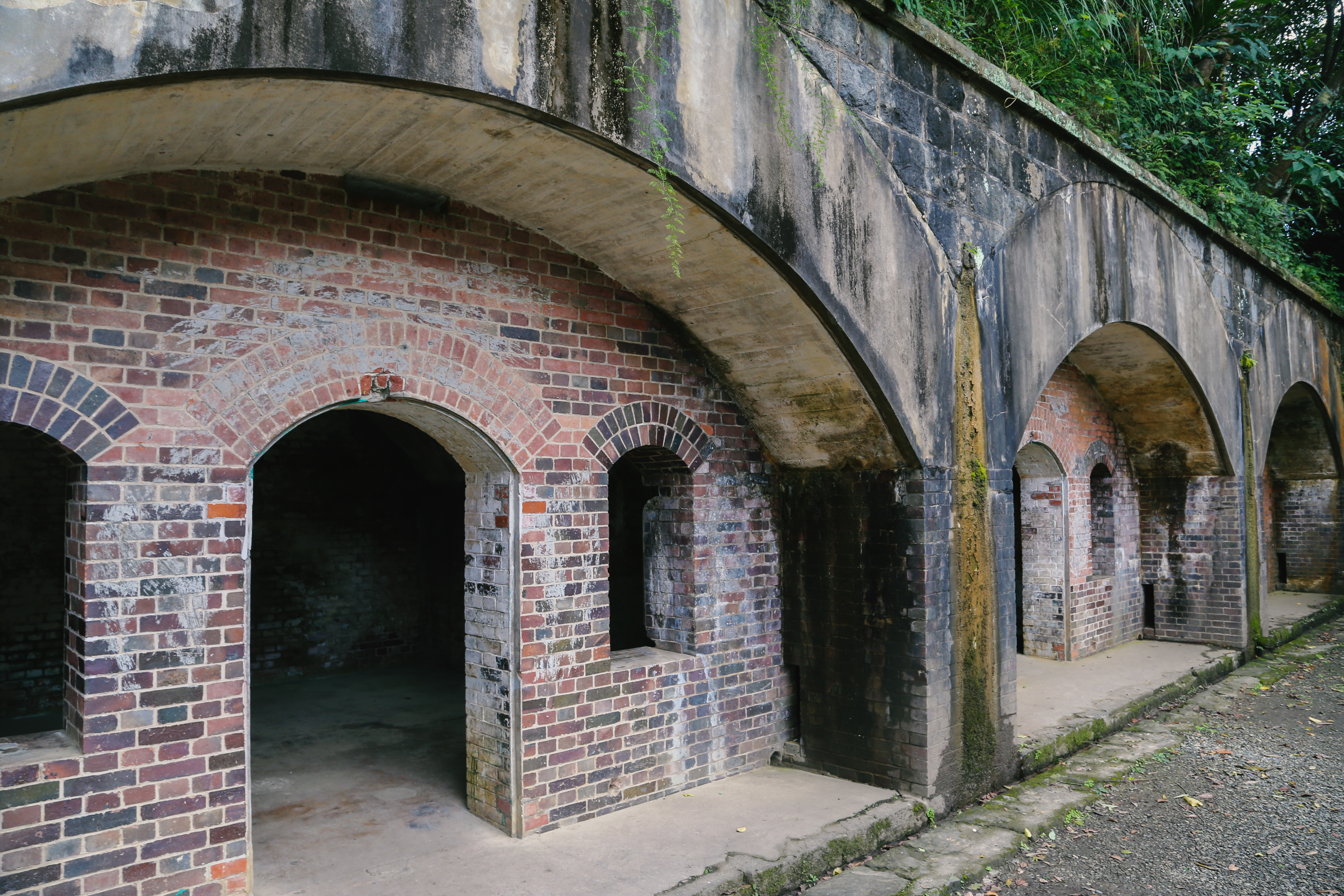
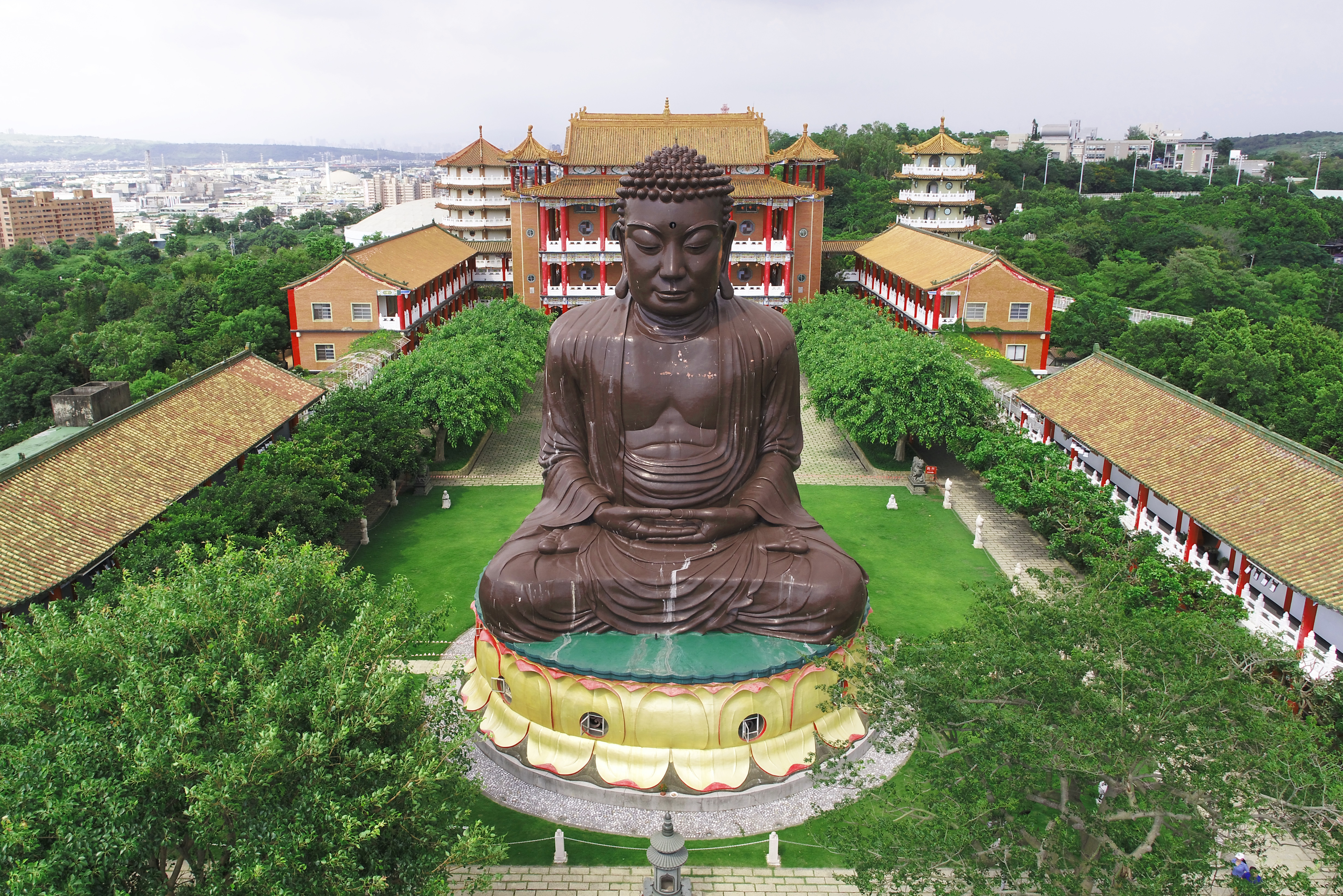
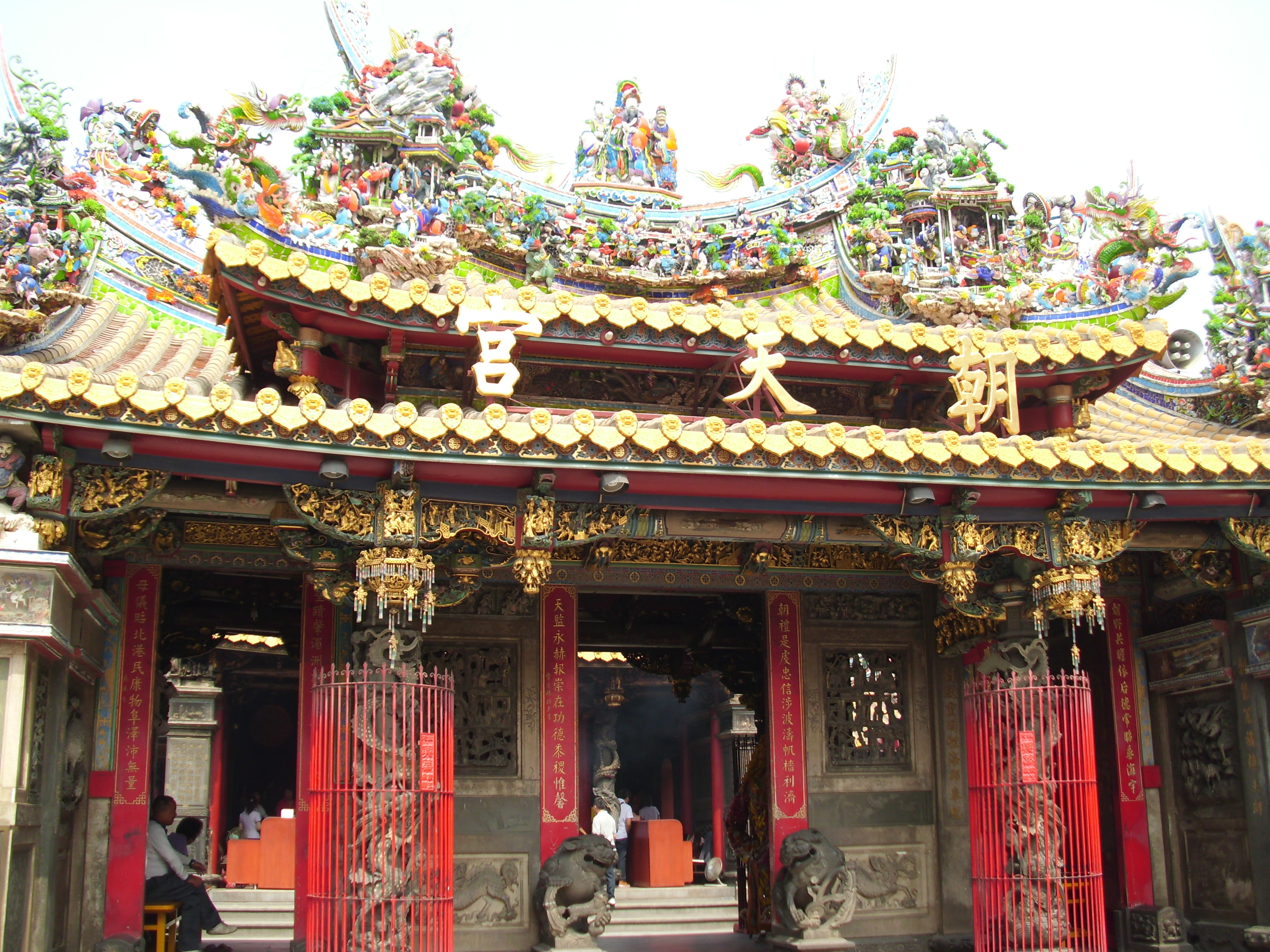
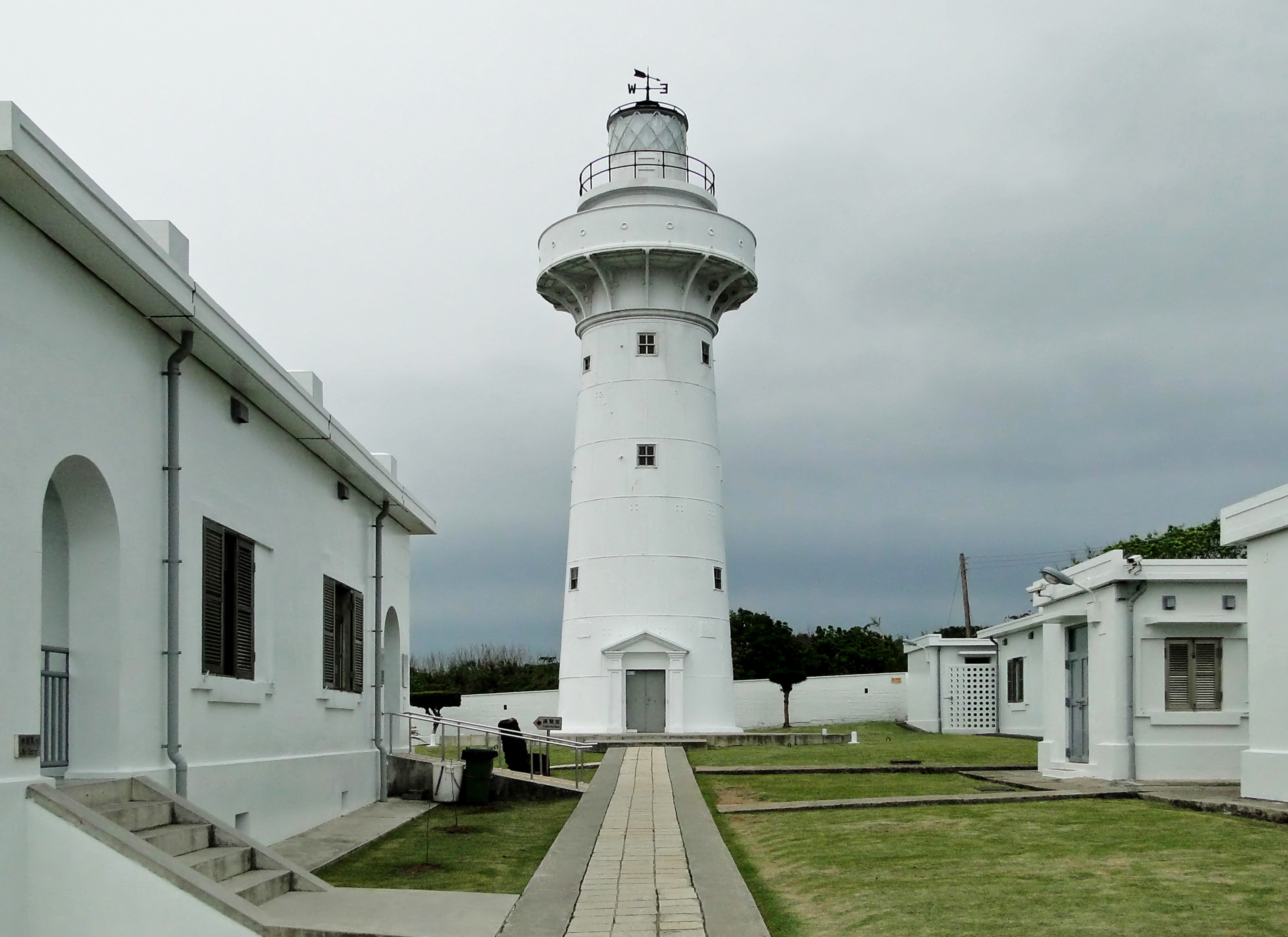
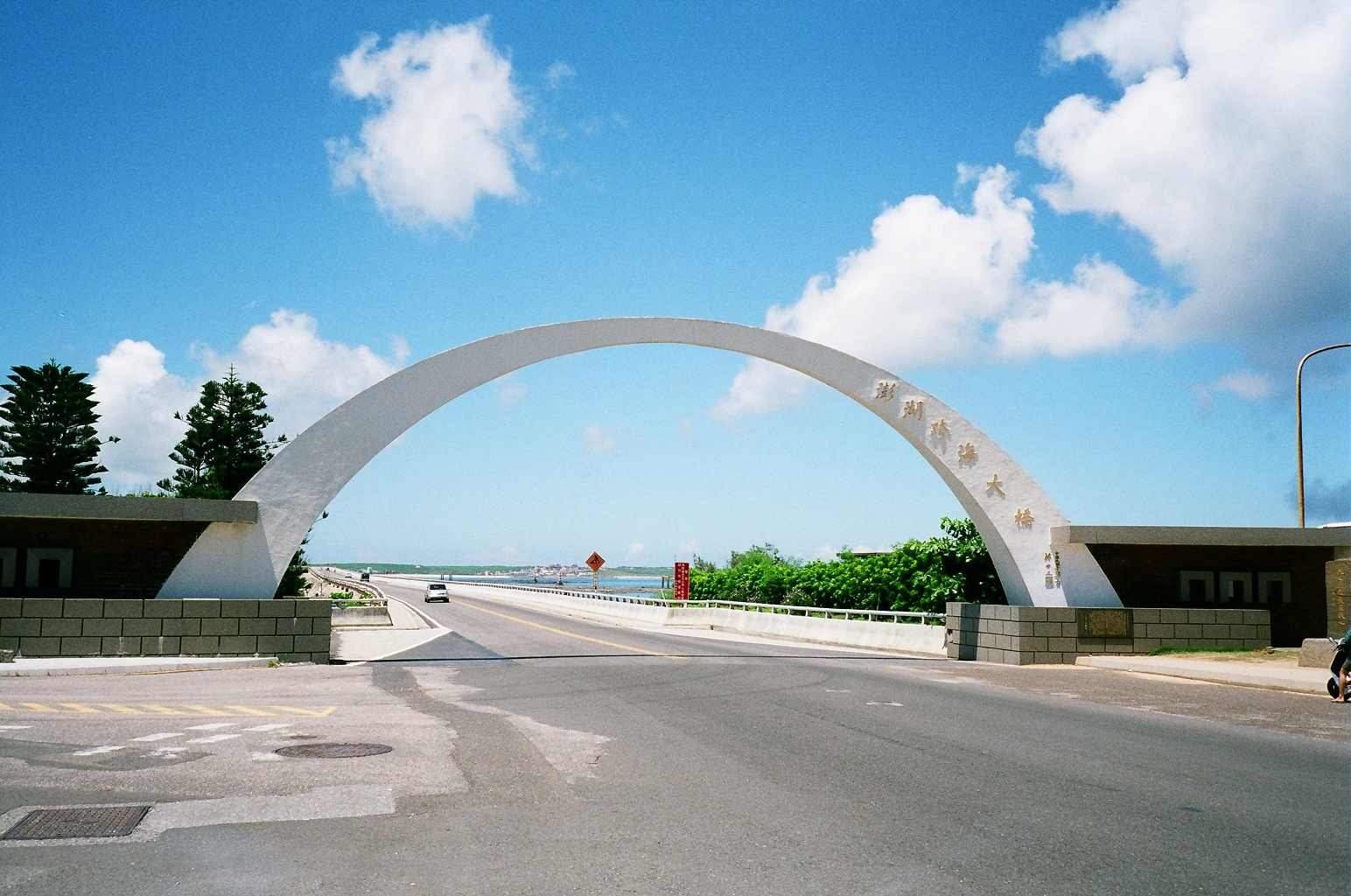

- Flag Seal

- Map depicting subdivisions nominally part of the province (red)
- Coordinates: 23.8°N 121.0°E
- Country: Republic of China
- Established from Fujian: 1887
- Annexed by Japan: 17 April 1895
- Placed under the control of the ROC: 25 October 1945
- Streamlined: 21 December 1998
- Governmental functions removed: 1 July 2018
- Provincial capital: Zhongxing New Village (1956–2018); Taipei (1945–1956)
- Largest city: Hsinchu
- Divisions: 11 counties, 3 cities

Government
  - Type: Province (nominal)
  - Body: Taiwan Provincial Government (1945–2018, now de jure) (Note: Dissolved in July 2018, National Development Council as the superseding agency.)

Area
  - Total: 25,110.0037 km^{2} (9,695.0266 sq mi)

Population (2020)
  - Total: 7,060,473
  - Density: 281.1817/km^{2} (728.2572/sq mi)
- Demonym: Taiwanese
- Time zone: UTC+08:00 (NST)

Taiwan
- "Taiwan" in Traditional (top) and Simplified (bottom) Chinese characters
- Traditional Chinese: 臺灣 or 台灣
- Simplified Chinese: 台湾
- Postal: Taiwan
Transcriptions
Standard Mandarin
- Hanyu Pinyin: Táiwān
- Bopomofo: ㄊㄞˊ ㄨㄢ
- Gwoyeu Romatzyh: Tair'uan
- Wade–Giles: Tʻai²-wan¹
- Tongyong Pinyin: Táiwan
- MPS2: Táiwān
- IPA: [tʰǎɪ.wán]
other Mandarin
- Dungan: Тэван
Wu
- Romanization: The^{平}-uae^{平} [d̥e uɛ]
Xiang
- IPA: dwɛ^{13} ua^{44}
Hakka
- Pha̍k-fa-sṳ: Thòi-vàn or Thòi-vân
Yue: Cantonese
- Yale Romanization: Tòihwāan
- Jyutping: Toi4waan1
- IPA: [tʰɔj˩.wan˥]
Southern Min
- Hokkien POJ: Tâi-oân
- Tâi-lô: Tâi-uân
Eastern Min
- Fuzhou BUC: Dài-uăng

Abbreviation
- Traditional Chinese: 臺 or 台
- Simplified Chinese: 台
Transcriptions
Standard Mandarin
- Hanyu Pinyin: Tái
- Bopomofo: ㄊㄞˊ
- Gwoyeu Romatzyh: Tair
- Wade–Giles: Tʻai²
- Tongyong Pinyin: Tái
- MPS2: Tái
- IPA: [tʰǎɪ]
Wu
- Romanization: The^{平} [d̥e]
Xiang
- IPA: dwɛ^{13}
Hakka
- Pha̍k-fa-sṳ: Thòi
Yue: Cantonese
- Yale Romanization: Tòih
- Jyutping: Toi4
- IPA: [tʰɔj˩]
Southern Min
- Hokkien POJ: Tâi
- Tâi-lô: Tâi
Eastern Min
- Fuzhou BUC: Dài

Taiwan Province
- Traditional Chinese: 臺灣省 or 台灣省
- Simplified Chinese: 台湾省
Transcriptions
Standard Mandarin
- Hanyu Pinyin: Táiwān Shěng
- Bopomofo: ㄊㄞˊ ㄨㄢ ㄕㄥˇ
- Gwoyeu Romatzyh: Tair'uan Sheeng
- Wade–Giles: Tʻai²-wan¹ Shêng³
- Tongyong Pinyin: Táiwan Shěng
- MPS2: Táiwān Shěng
- IPA: [tʰǎɪ.wán ʂə̀ŋ]
Hakka
- Pha̍k-fa-sṳ: Thòi-vàn-sén or Thòi-vân-sén
Yue: Cantonese
- Yale Romanization: Tòihwāan Sáang
- Jyutping: Toi4waan1 Saang2
- IPA: [tʰɔj˩.wan˥ saŋ˧˥]
Southern Min
- Hokkien POJ: Tâi-oân-séng
- Tâi-lô: Tâi-uân-síng
Eastern Min
- Fuzhou BUC: Dài-uăng sēng

Taiwan (Chinese: 臺灣; pinyin: Táiwān Shěng; Pe̍h-ōe-jī: Tâi-oân-séng; PFS: Thòi-vàn-sén or Thòi-vân-sén) is a de jure province of the Republic of China. Provinces remain a nominal division as a part of the Constitution of the Republic of China, but are no longer considered to have any administrative function practically.

Taiwan Province constitutionally covers approximately 69% of the island of Taiwan, and comprises around 31% of the total population. It initially covered the entire island of Taiwan (Formosa), Penghu (the Pescadores), Orchid Island, Green Island, Xiaoliuqiu Island, and their surrounding islands. Between 1967 and 2014, six special municipalities (Kaohsiung, New Taipei, Taichung, Tainan, Taipei and Taoyuan) were split off from it, all in the most populous regions.

Taiwan was initially made a prefecture of Fujian Province by the Qing dynasty of China after its conquest of the Kingdom of Tungning in 1683. Following the French offensive in northern Taiwan during the Sino-French War, the island's strategic position in maritime security and defence was re-evaluated and given prominence by the Qing. Under the auspices of Liu Ming-chuan, a plan was commenced to develop Taiwan into a stand-alone division. In 1887, Taiwan was designated as a distinct province (namely "Fujian-Taiwan"; Chinese: 福建臺灣), with Liu as the first governor, but the island was then ceded to the Empire of Japan in 1895, following China's defeat in the First Sino-Japanese War. After the surrender of Japan in World War II, the province was re-established on Taiwan by the Kuomintang (KMT)-led Nationalist Government on 25 October 1945, and it became the last stronghold of the KMT government after their defeat in the Chinese Civil War. The provincial capital of Taipei has correspondingly become the provisional capital of the central government since 1949.

During the constitutional reform initiated in 1996, the ROC government decided to downsize the provincial structure to streamline overlapping personnel and administrative resources between the provincial and central governments, and cut excessive public spending. The provinces ceased to be self-governing bodies in December 1998, with their administrative functions transferred to the Executive Yuan's subsidiary National Development Council, as well as second-tier local governments such as counties. In July 2018, all provincial governmental organs were formally abolished, with their budget and personnel removed.

== History ==
=== Qing dynasty ===
In 1683, Zheng Keshuang (third ruler of the Kingdom of Tungning and a grandson of Koxinga), surrendered to the Qing Empire following a naval engagement with Admiral Shi Lang. The Qing then ruled the Taiwanese archipelago (including Penghu) as Taiwan Prefecture of Fujian Province. In 1875, Taipeh Prefecture was separated from Taiwan Prefecture. In 1885, work commenced under the auspices of Liu Ming-chuan to develop Taiwan into a province. In 1887, the island was designated as a province (officially "Fujian-Taiwan"; Chinese: 福建臺灣), with Liu as the first governor. The province was also reorganized into four prefectures, eleven districts, and three sub-prefectures. The provincial capital, or "Taiwan-fu", was intended to be moved from the south (modern-day Tainan) to the more central area of Toatun (modern-day Taichung) in the revamped Taiwan Prefecture. As the new central Taiwan-fu was still under construction, the capital was temporarily moved north to Taipeh (modern-day Taipei), which eventually was designated the provincial capital.

In 1895, the entire province was ceded to Japan following the First Sino-Japanese War through the Treaty of Shimonoseki.

Divisions of Taiwan (Formosa) as a province
Circuit	Prefectures	Districts	Sub-Prefectures
Taiwan	Taipeh	Tamsui	Kelung
Taiwan	Taipeh	Gilan	
Taiwan	Taipeh	Hsinchu	
Taiwan	Taiwan	Taiwan (臺灣縣)	
Taiwan	Taiwan	Changwha	Puli
Taiwan	Taiwan	Yunlin	
Taiwan	Taiwan	Miaoli	
Taiwan	Tainan	Anping	Penghu
Taiwan	Tainan	Kagi	
Taiwan	Tainan	Fengshan	
Taiwan	Tainan	Hengchun	
Taiwan	Taitung		

=== Republic of China ===
Map of Taiwan province within the de jure territory of the ROC in 1945.

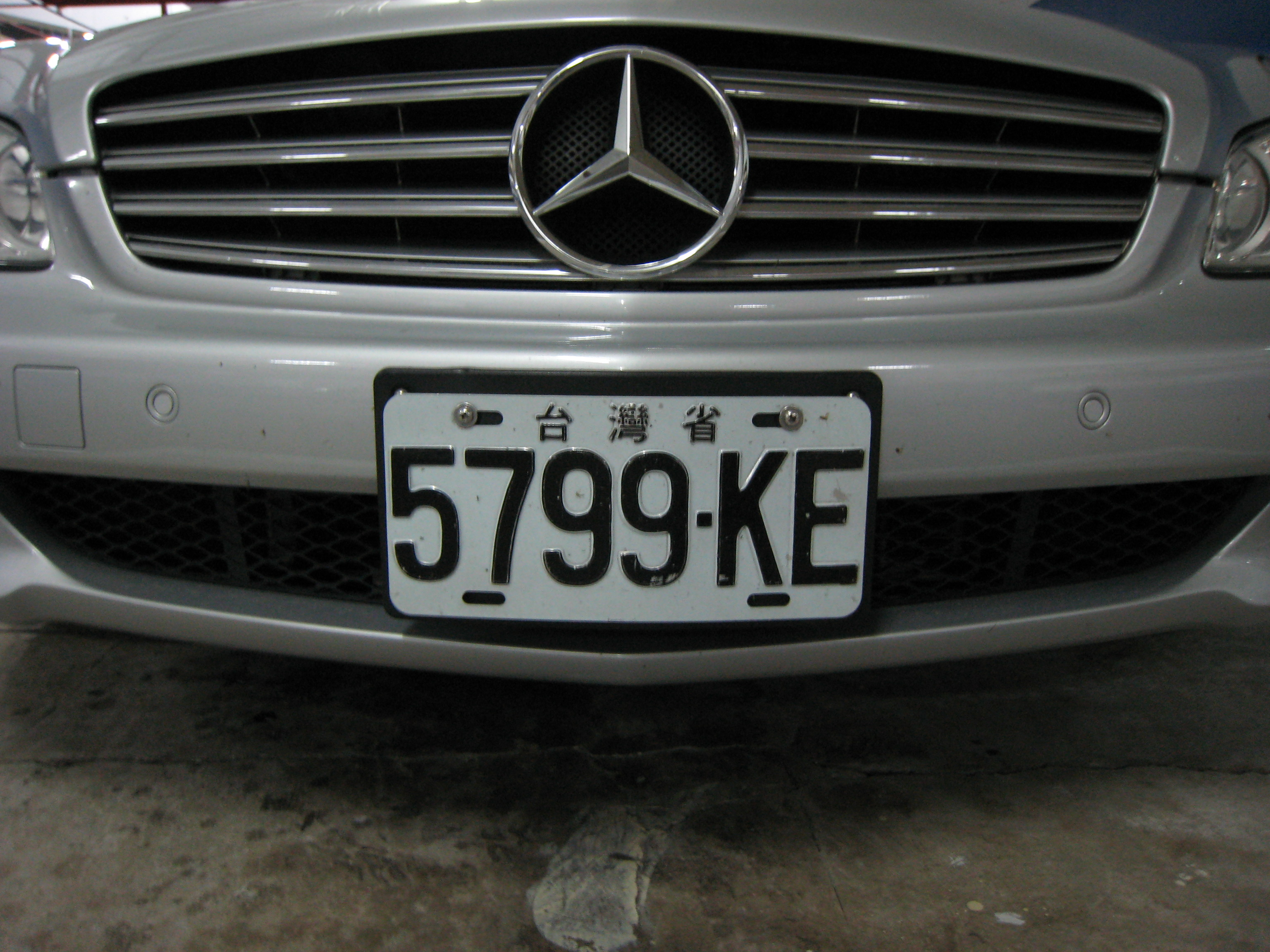
Prior to 1 January 2007 all vehicles registered in Taiwan Province carried the label "Taiwan province" (台灣省) on their license plates.

After the surrender of Japan in 1945, Taiwan was handed over to the Republic of China (ROC). The ROC government immediately established the Taiwan Provincial Government under first Chief Executive and government-general Chen Yi in September 1945. Chen was extremely unpopular and his rule led to an uprising: the February 28 Incident of 1947. Chen was recalled in May 1947 and the government-general position was abolished.

In 1949, Chinese Communist Party forces defeated the Kuomintang (KMT) in the Chinese Civil War, and the Republic of China government moved to Taipei. The provincial administration remained in place under the claim that the ROC was still the government of all of China even though the opposition argued that it overlapped inefficiently with the national government. The Ministry of Foreign Affairs of the People's Republic of China claims that Taiwan is a sacred and inseparable part of China's territory, despite its separation from the mainland since 1949.

The seat of the provincial government was moved from Taipei to Zhongxing New Village in 1956. Historically, Taiwan province covers the entire island of Taiwan and all its associated islands. The city of Taipei was split off to become a province-level special municipality in 1967, and the city of Kaohsiung was split off in 1979 to become another special municipality. In December 2010, Kaohsiung County left the province and merged with the original Kaohsiung City to become an expanded Kaohsiung City, Taipei County became the special municipality named New Taipei City. The cities and counties of Taichung and Tainan were also merged, respectively, and elevated to special municipality. On 25 December 2014, Taoyuan County was upgraded into a special municipality and split off from Taiwan province.

Until 1992, the governor of Taiwan province was appointed by the ROC central government. The office was often a stepping stone to higher office.

In 1992, the post of the governor of the province was opened to election. The then-opposition Democratic Progressive Party (DPP) agreed to retain the province with an elected governor in the hopes of creating a "Yeltsin effect" in which a popular local leader could overwhelm the national government. These hopes proved unfulfilled as then-Kuomintang member James Soong was elected governor of Taiwan province, defeating the DPP candidate Chen Ding-nan.

In 1997, as the result of an agreement between the KMT and the DPP, the powers of the provincial government were curtailed by constitutional amendments. The post of provincial governor was abolished. In addition, the provincial council was also replaced by the Taiwan Provincial Consultative Council. Although the stated purpose was administrative efficiency, Soong and his supporters claim that it was actually intended to impede James Soong's political life, though it did not have this effect.

The provincial administration was downscaled in 1998, most of its power handed to the central government. The counties and provincial cities under the province became the primary administrative divisions of the country.

== Government ==
The position of the Chairperson of the Provincial Government, appointed by the central government, is retained to comply with the Constitution.

The major operations of the provincial government, such as managing provincial highways and the Bank of Taiwan, have been transferred to the Executive Yuan since 1998. In July 2018, all remaining duties were transferred to the National Development Council and other ministries of the Executive Yuan.

The Taiwan Provincial Government was located in Zhongxing New Village, Nantou City, Nantou County between 1957 and 2018.

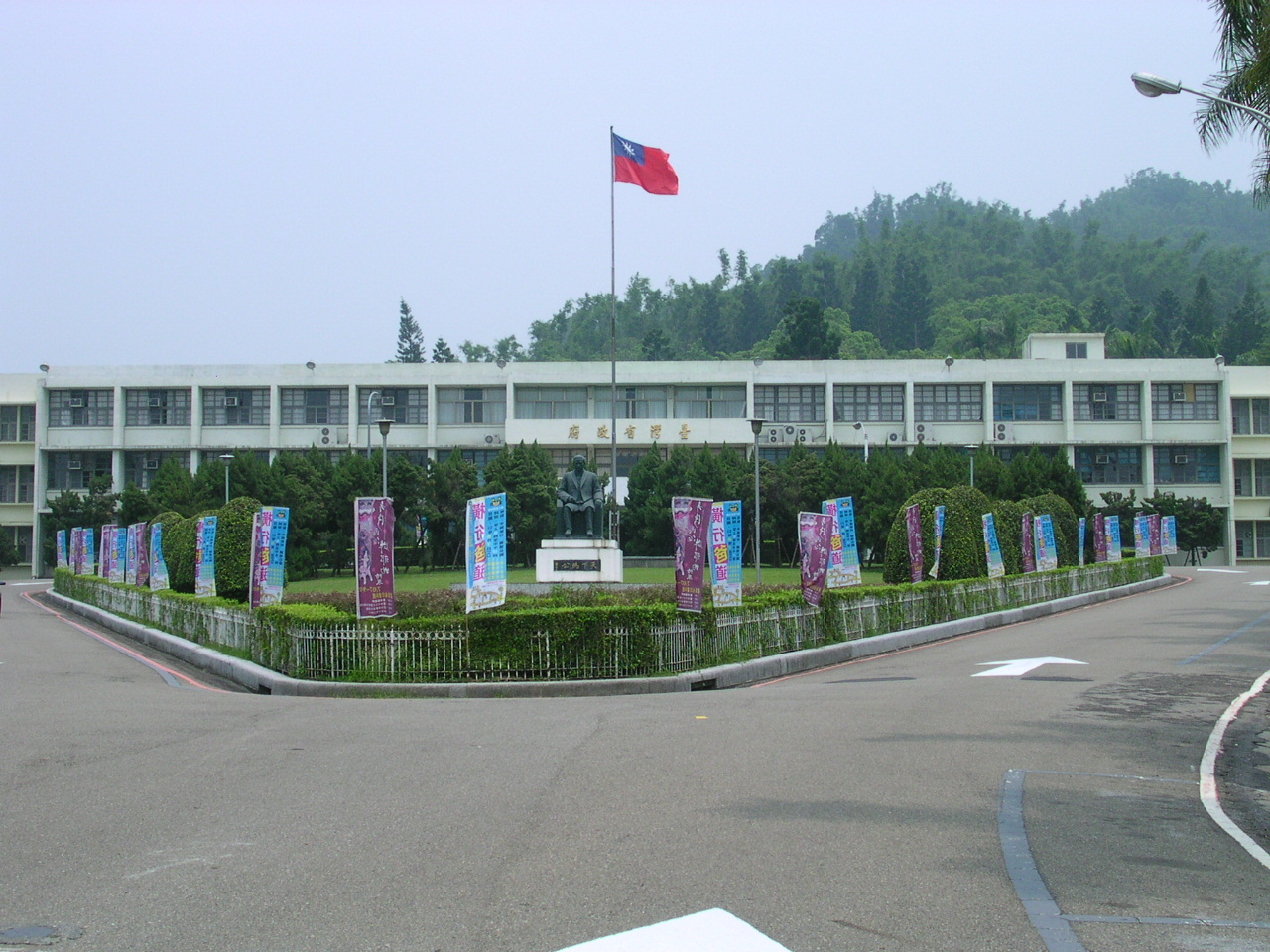
The Taiwan Provincial Government building between 1957 and 2018. Currently the Office of the Zhongxing New Village Revitalization Project, National Development Council

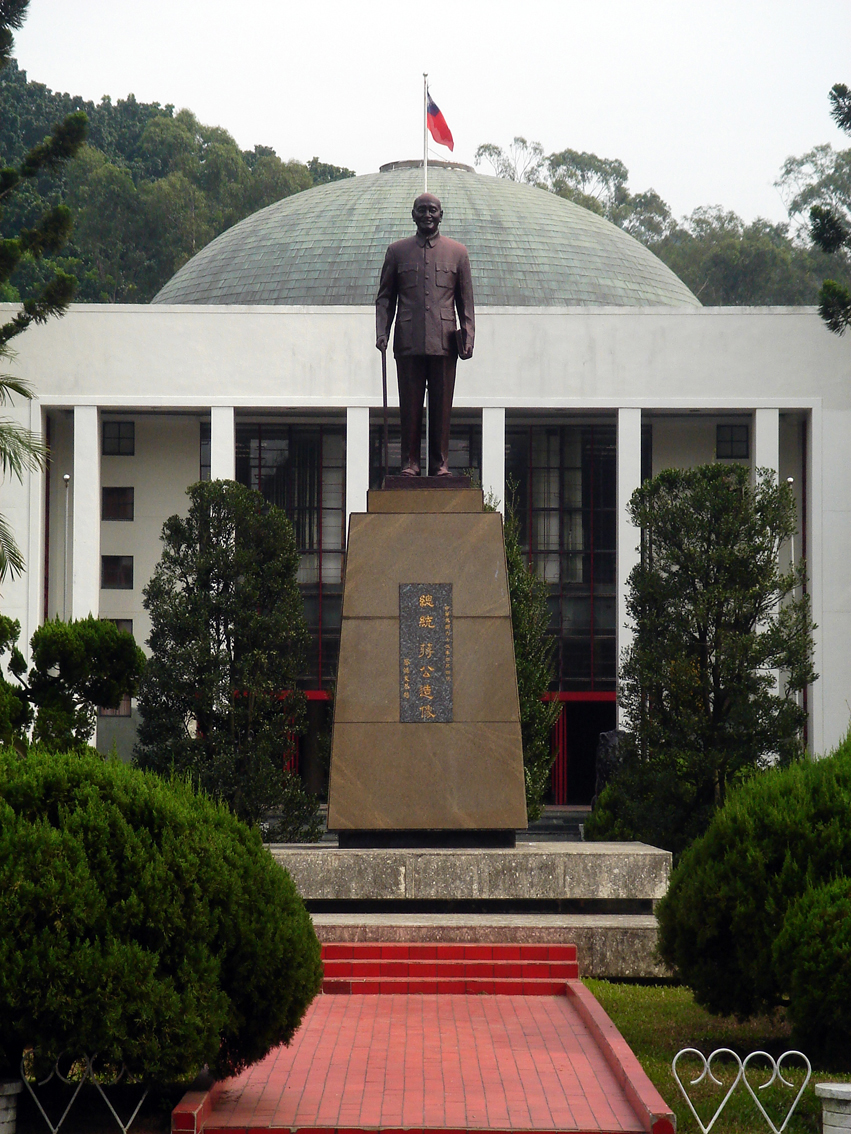
The Taiwan Provincial Consultative Council building between 1958 and 2018. Currently a heritage site managed by the Taichung City Government

== Divisions ==
=== History of divisions ===
In October 1945, The Government of the Republic of China reformed the eight(8) Japanese prefectures under the Government-General of Taiwan into 8 counties and 9 cities.

Year	Date	Division No.			Notes
Year	Date	Counties	Cities	Bureaus	Notes
1945	25 October	8	9		Counties: Hsinchu, Hualien, Kaohsiung, Penghu, Taichung, Tainan, Taipei, and Taitung.; Cities: Changhua, Chiayi, Hsinchu, Kaohsiung, Keelung, Pingtung, Taichung, Tainan, and Taipei. (with 2 county-controlled cities: Hualien and Yilan)
1949	26 August	8	9	1	Ts'ao-shan Administrative Bureau established from Taipei County
1950	1 April	8	9	1	Ts'ao-shan Administrative Bureau renamed to Yangmingshan Administrative Bureau
1950	16 August	16	5	1	Counties: Changhua, Chiayi, Hsinchu, Hualien, Kaohsiung, Miaoli, Nantou, Penghu, Pingtung, Taichung, Tainan, Taipei, Taitung, Taoyuan, Yilan, and Yunlin; Cities: Kaohsiung, Keelung, Taichung, Tainan, and Taipei. (Chiayi, Changhua, Hsinchu, and Pingtung downgraded to county-administered cities); Bureau: Yangmingshan Administrative Bureau
1967	1 July	16	4	1	Taipei became the first Taiwanese special municipality
1968	1 July	16	4		Yangmingshan Administrative Bureau merged into Taipei
1973	1 July	16	4	1	Li-shan Administrative Bureau established from Taichung County
1979	1 July	16	3	1	Kaohsiung became the second Taiwanese special municipality
1981	1 March	16	3		Li-shan Administrative Bureau merged back to Taichung County
1981	25 December	16	3		All county seats (originally urban townships) upgraded to county-administered cities.
1982	1 July	16	5		Upgrade Chiayi and Hsinchu to provincial cities (approved on 23 April 1981)
1998	21 December	16	5		Provincial government streamlined, all counties and cities are directly led by the Executive Yuan
2010	25 December	12	3		Upgrade Kaohsiung, New Taipei, Taichung, Tainan to special municipalities, which covers 4 counties (Kaohsiung, Taipei, Taichung, Tainan) and 2 cities (Taichung and Tainan).
2014	25 December	11	3		Upgrade Taoyuan to a special municipality.
2018	1 July	11	3		Provincial government defunct, all counties and cities are directly led by the Executive Yuan

=== Current divisions ===
Taiwan province is nominally divided into 11 counties and 3 cities . All divisions are directly administered by the central government in practice.

Map	No.	Name		Mandarin (Pinyin)	Taiwanese (Pe̍h-ōe-jī)	Hakka (Pha̍k-fa-sṳ)
	1	Changhua County	彰化縣	Zhānghuà xiàn	Chiong-hoà koān	Chông-fa yen
	2	Chiayi City	嘉義市	Jiāyì shì	Ka-gī chhī	Kâ-ngi sṳ
	3	Chiayi County	嘉義縣	Jiāyì xiàn	Ka-gī koān	Kâ-ngi yen
	4	Hsinchu City	新竹市	Xīnzhú shì	Sin-tek chhī	Sîn-tsuk sṳ
	5	Hsinchu County	新竹縣	Xīnzhú xiàn	Sin-tek koān	Sîn-tsuk yen
	6	Hualien County	花蓮縣	Huālián xiàn	Hoa-liân koān	Fâ-lièn yen
	7	Keelung City	基隆市	Jīlóng shì	Ke-lâng chhī	Kî-lùng sṳ
	8	Miaoli County	苗栗縣	Miáolì xiàn	Biâu-le̍k koān	Mèu-li̍t yen
	9	Nantou County	南投縣	Nántóu xiàn	Lâm-tâu koān	Nàm-thèu yen
	10	Penghu County	澎湖縣	Pénghú xiàn	Phêⁿ-ô͘ koān	Phàng-fù yen
	11	Pingtung County	屏東縣	Píngdōng xiàn	Pîn-tong koān	Phìn-tûng yen
	12	Taitung County	臺東縣	Táidōng xiàn	Tâi-tang koān	Thòi-tûng yen
	13	Yilan County	宜蘭縣	Yílán xiàn	Gî-lân koān	Ngì-làn yen
	14	Yunlin County	雲林縣	Yúnlín xiàn	Hûn-lîm koān	Yùn-lìm yen

Note that the special municipalities of Kaohsiung, New Taipei, Taichung, Tainan, Taipei, and Taoyuan are both nominally under and directly administered by the central government. They are not parts of any province.

== Sister states/provinces ==
Taiwan province was twinned with 42 U.S. states:

- Indiana (1979)
- Utah (1980)
- Oklahoma (1980)
- Arizona (1980)
- Missouri (1980)
- Tennessee (1980)
- West Virginia (1980)
- Virginia (1981)
- South Carolina (1981)
- Kentucky (1982)
- Colorado (1983)
- Mississippi (1983)
- Nebraska (1983)
- Arkansas (1983)
- Alabama (1983)
- California (1984)
- Idaho (1984)
- Minnesota (1984)
- Georgia (1984)
- Wyoming (1984)
- South Dakota (1984)
- Louisiana (1985)
- Ohio (1985)
- New Mexico (1985)
- Montana (1985)
- Nevada (1985)
- North Dakota (1986)
- Wisconsin (1986)
- Oregon (1986)
- Texas (1988)
- Alaska (1988)
- New Jersey (1989)
- Iowa (1989)
- Kansas (1989)
- North Carolina (1991)
- Massachusetts (1992)
- Florida (1992)
- Illinois (1992)
- Hawaii (1993)
- Connecticut (1999)
- Vermont (1999)
- Delaware (2000)

== Territorial disputes ==
The People's Republic of China (PRC) regards itself as the "successor state" of the Republic of China (ROC), which the PRC claims no longer legitimately exists, following establishment of the PRC on Mainland China. The PRC asserts itself to be the sole legitimate government of China, and claims Taiwan as its 23rd province, even though the PRC itself has never had control of Taiwan or other ROC-held territories. The ROC disputes this position, maintaining that it still legitimately exists and that the PRC has not succeeded it.

The PRC claims the entirety of the island of Taiwan and its nearby islands and islets, including the Penghu, as parts of its province, corresponding to the ROC's province before the special municipalities were split off. The PRC claims that Taiwan is a part of China, that the PRC succeeded the ROC as the sole legitimate authority in all of China upon its founding in 1949, and that therefore Taiwan is a part of the PRC.

The Senkaku Islands, which are currently administered by Japan, are disputed by both the ROC and the PRC, which claim them as the Tiaoyutai/Diaoyu Islands. The ROC government claims them as part of Toucheng Township, Yilan County.

== See also ==
- Chinese Taipei
- Fuchien Province, Republic of China
- History of the Republic of China
- Political status of Taiwan
- Politics of the Republic of China
- "Taiwan, China" – A political term used by the People's Republic of China
- Taiwan (People's Republic of China province)
