= Wang Sing-nan =

- 王幸男

Personal details
- Born: 27 June 1941 (age 84) Tamai Village, Shinka District, Tainan Prefecture, Japanese Taiwan (modern-day Yujing District, Tainan, Taiwan)
- Party: Democratic Progressive Party
- Education: Republic of China Military Academy

Wang Sing-nan
- Chinese: 王幸男
Transcriptions
Standard Mandarin
- Hanyu Pinyin: Wáng Xìngnán
- Wade–Giles: Wáng Hsìngnán
Southern Min
- Hokkien POJ: Ông Hēng-lâm

Wang Sing-nan (Chinese: 王幸男; born 27 June 1941) is the caucus whip for the Democratic Progressive Party in the Legislative Yuan of the Republic of China on Taiwan. He has represented the electoral district of Tainan City since February 2005. On 10 October 1976, he sent a mail bomb to then-Governor of Taiwan Province Hsieh Tung-min, who suffered serious injuries to both hands as a result. He was sentenced to life imprisonment for this and was imprisoned in the Green Island Prison until then-President Lee Teng-hui granted him clemency in 1990.
