= Zhongxing Pagoda =

Pagoda in Niaosong, Kaohsiung, Taiwan

- 中興塔
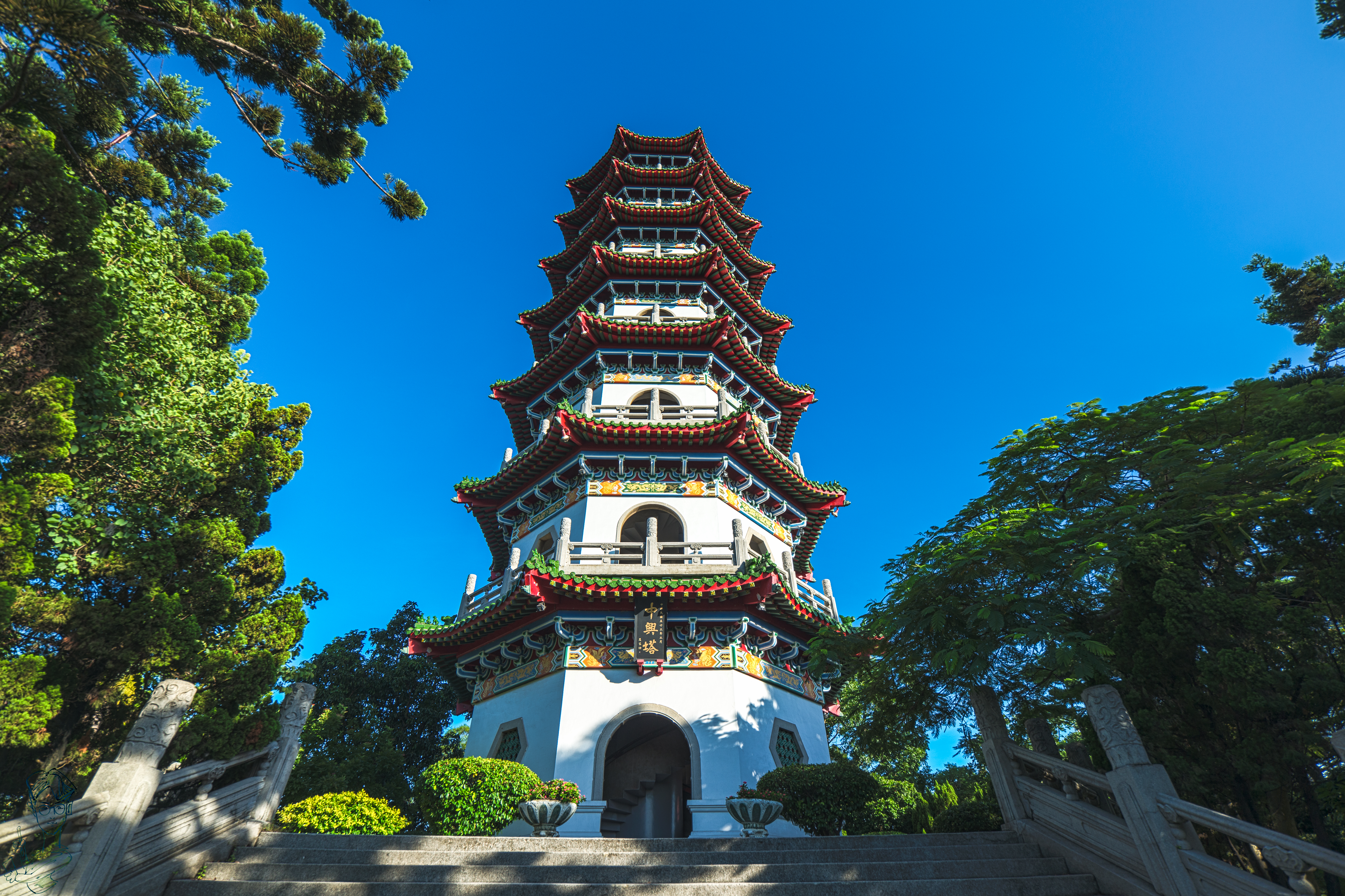

- Location within Kaohsiung

Location
- Location: Niaosong, Kaohsiung, Taiwan
- Interactive map of Zhongxing Pagoda
- Coordinates: 22°40′00.4″N 120°20′33.7″E

Architecture
- Type: pagoda
- Height (max): 43 m

The Zhongxing Pagoda (traditional Chinese: 中興塔; simplified Chinese: 中兴塔; pinyin: Zhōngxìng Tǎ) is a pagoda in Chengcing Lake, Niaosong District, Kaohsiung, Taiwan.

== Architecture ==
The pagoda stands at a height of 43 meters over 7 floors. It is surrounded by various plants and flowers.

== See also ==
- Religion in Taiwan
