= Niaosong Wetland Park =

Wetland in Niaosong, Kaohsiung, Taiwan

- 鳥松濕地公園 (Chinese)
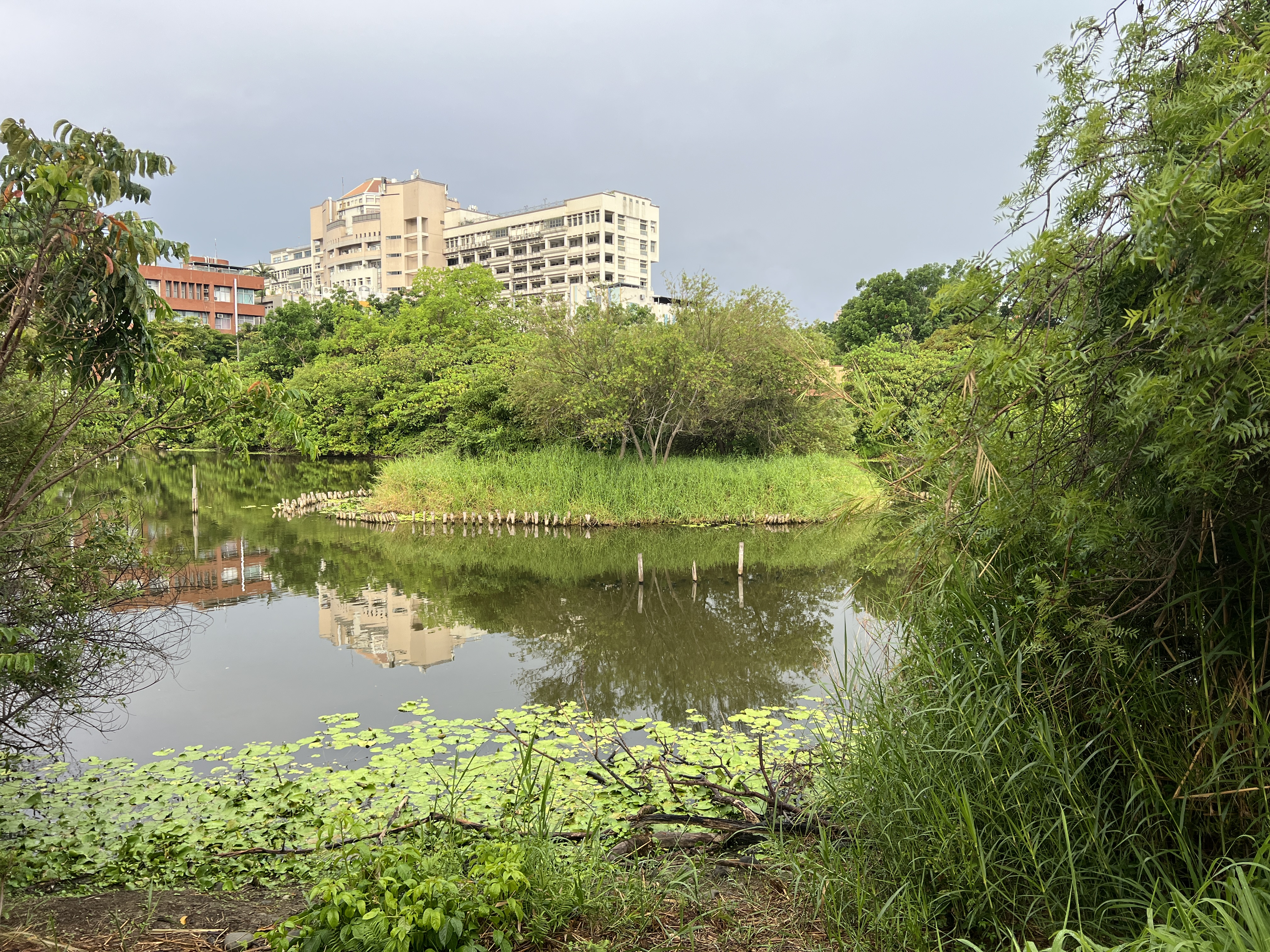

- Location within Kaohsiung
- Location: Niaosong, Kaohsiung, Taiwan
- Coordinates: 22°39′08.6″N 120°21′02.2″E
- Type: wetland
- Built: 24 September 2000
- Surface area: 3 hectares (7.4 acres)

Niaosong Wetland Park (traditional Chinese: 鳥松濕地公園; simplified Chinese: 鸟松湿地公园; pinyin: Niǎosōng Shīdì Gōngyuán) is a park in Niaosong District, Kaohsiung, Taiwan.

== History ==
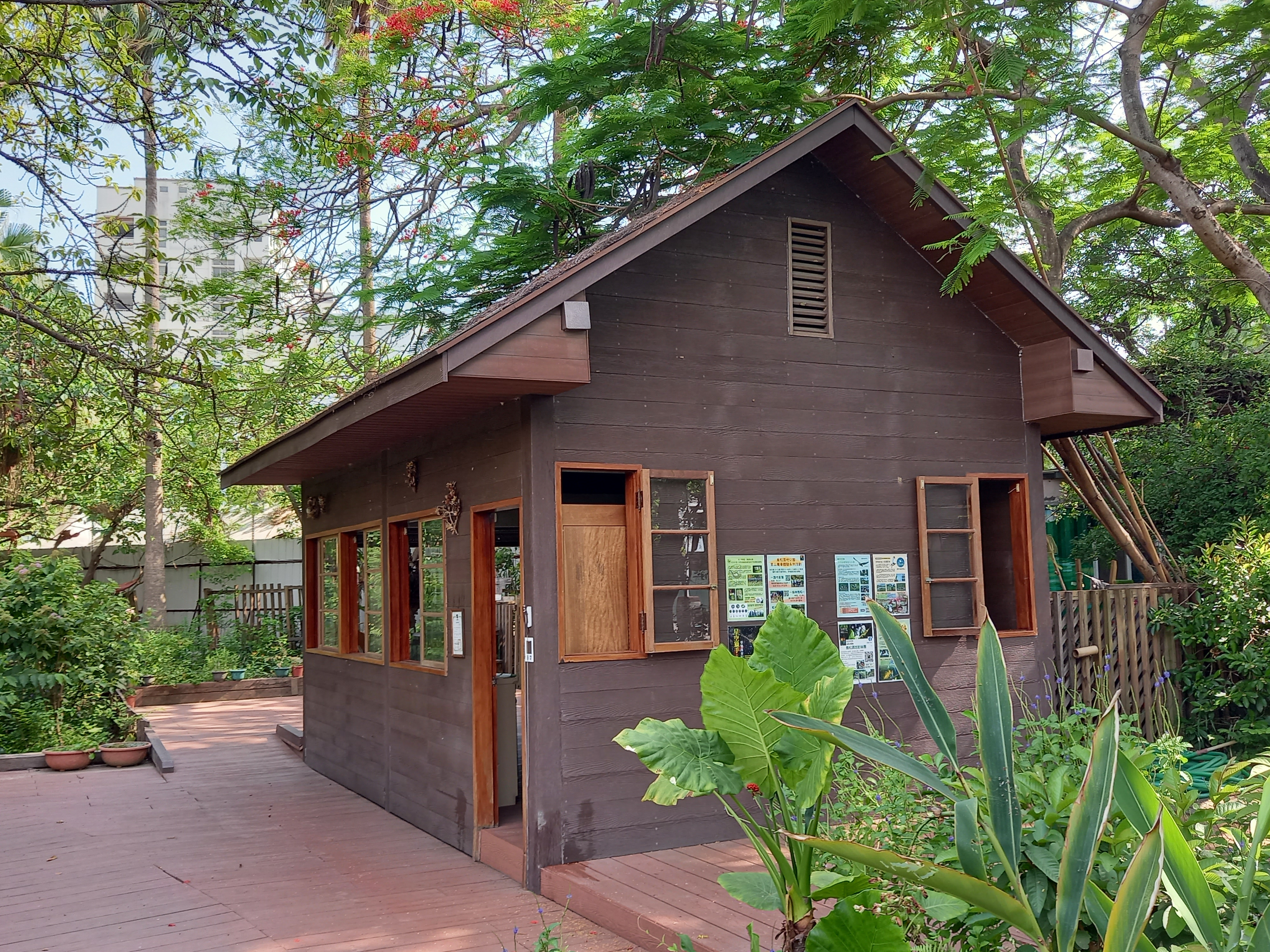
Nature Centre

Named after Niaosong District, Niaosong Wetland Park was the first deliberately planned and created wetland in Taiwan. Until the mid-1990s the area was a series of settling basins owned by the state-run water authority, with sediment regularly dredged out to maintain sandy-bottomed ponds.

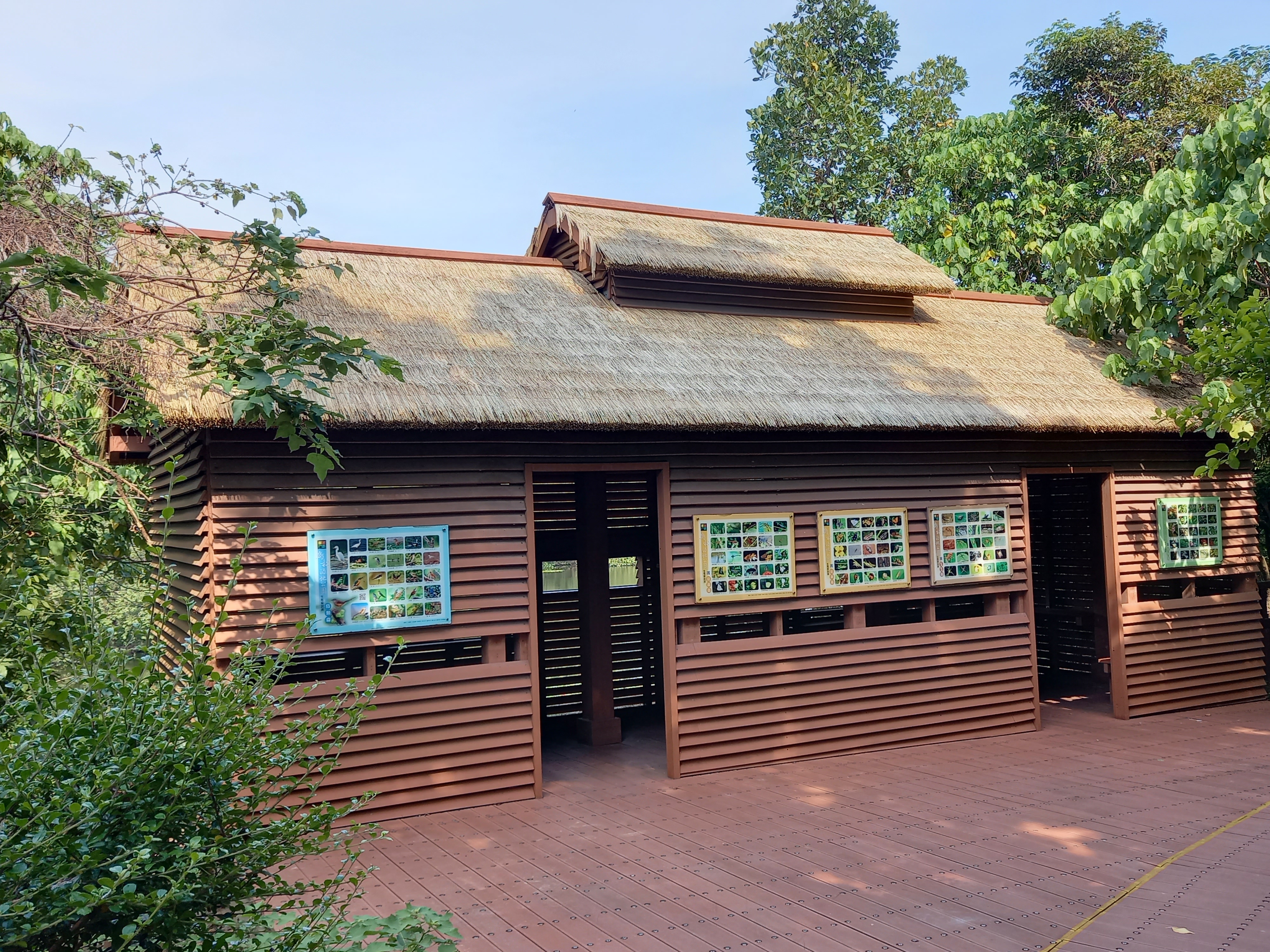
Bird hide

After lobbying by conservation groups such as Kaohsiung Wild Bird Society and Wetlands Taiwan the Kaohsiung County Government drafted a plan for a wetland park in April 1995, and announced it in October of that year. In June 1999 Yu Cheng-hsien, the Kaohsiung County Magistrate, officiated the park's groundbreaking ceremony. Construction was finished in June 2000 and the park officially opened on 24 September 2000. On 24 October 2002, the Kaohsiung Wild Bird Society was appointed to manage the park. The first habitat manager was hired in October 2003 after a public funding campaign. and a nature centre was built in 2005.

The park was declared a Wetland of Regional Importance in 2007, and in 2018 it was designated a Wetland of Local Importance. Wooden boardwalks were constructed around and through the park and upgraded in 2024.

== Geography ==
The park is located near Chengcing Lake, in Niaosong District, Kaohsiung County, occupying a roughly triangular piece of land bordered by Chengcing Road and Dabi Road. It has a footprint of roughly 3.8 hectares, which includes 2 hectares of water, comprising several ponds and an area of wetland. Its catchment is the Grand Hotel Kaohsiung, which drains into a small settling basin, and then into a small pond and larger pond; the pond depth is maintained at 1.1 metres, and overflow is released into Dapi Road gutters via a spillway.

== Ecology ==
Although regular removal of sediment was stopped after the water authority handed over the park for conservation purposes, if left untouched all the ponds would eventually revert to wetland and then swamp forest. To prevent this work on desilting and dredging of the bottom of the settling basin and the wetland's smaller pond was carried out from 25 October 2007 until 25 January 2008. In March 2010, desilting and dredging of the larger pond was carried out, and completed on 9 July 2010.

The wetland has a diverse terrain, and contains numerous animal species. There have been 89 bird species, 280 insect species, and 300 plant species recorded from the park. Commonly seen birds include great egrets, little egrets, intermediate egrets, black-crowned night herons, and common moorhens. Collared scops owls regularly breed in the park and can be seen roosting during the day.

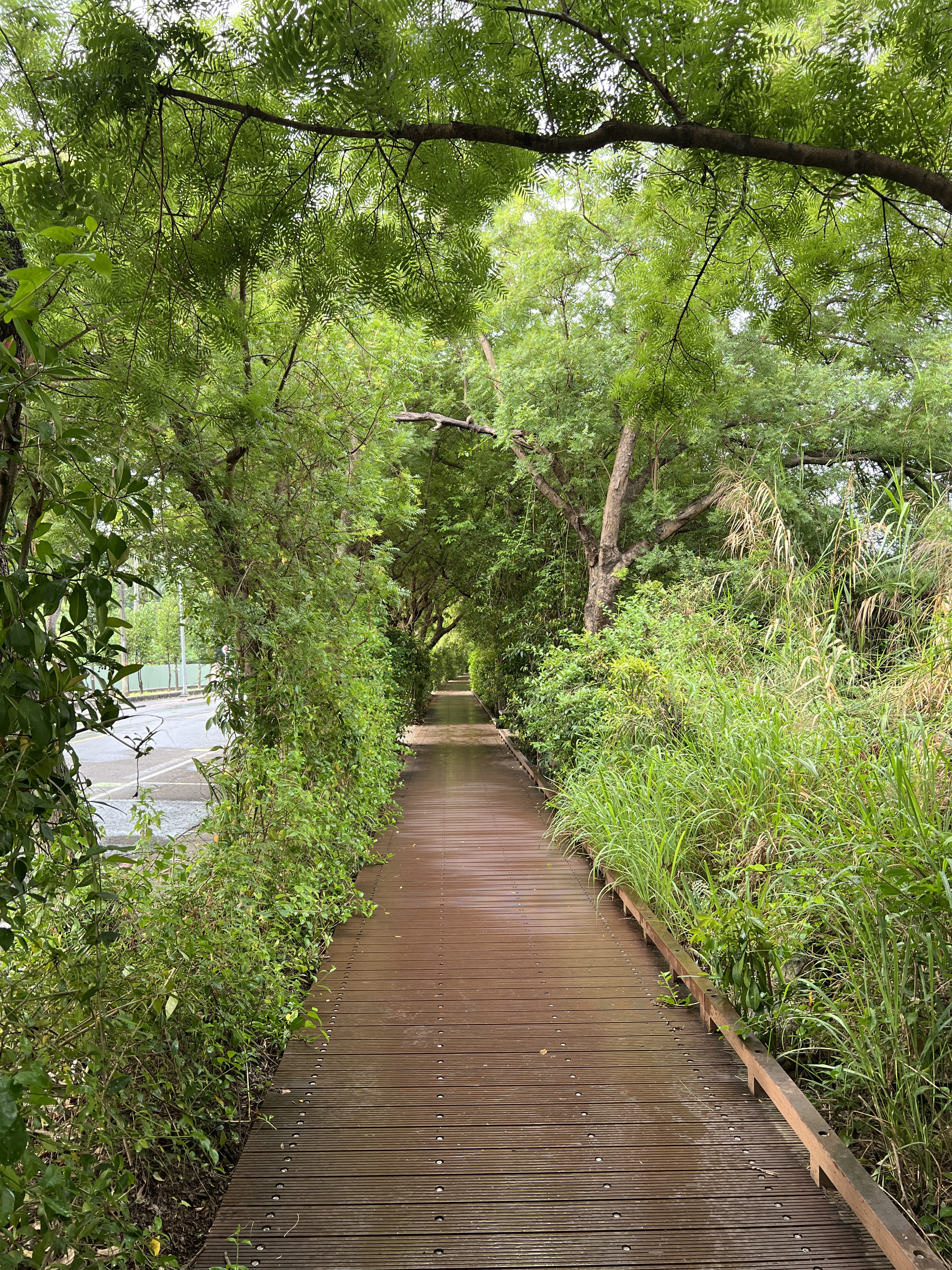
Boardwalk

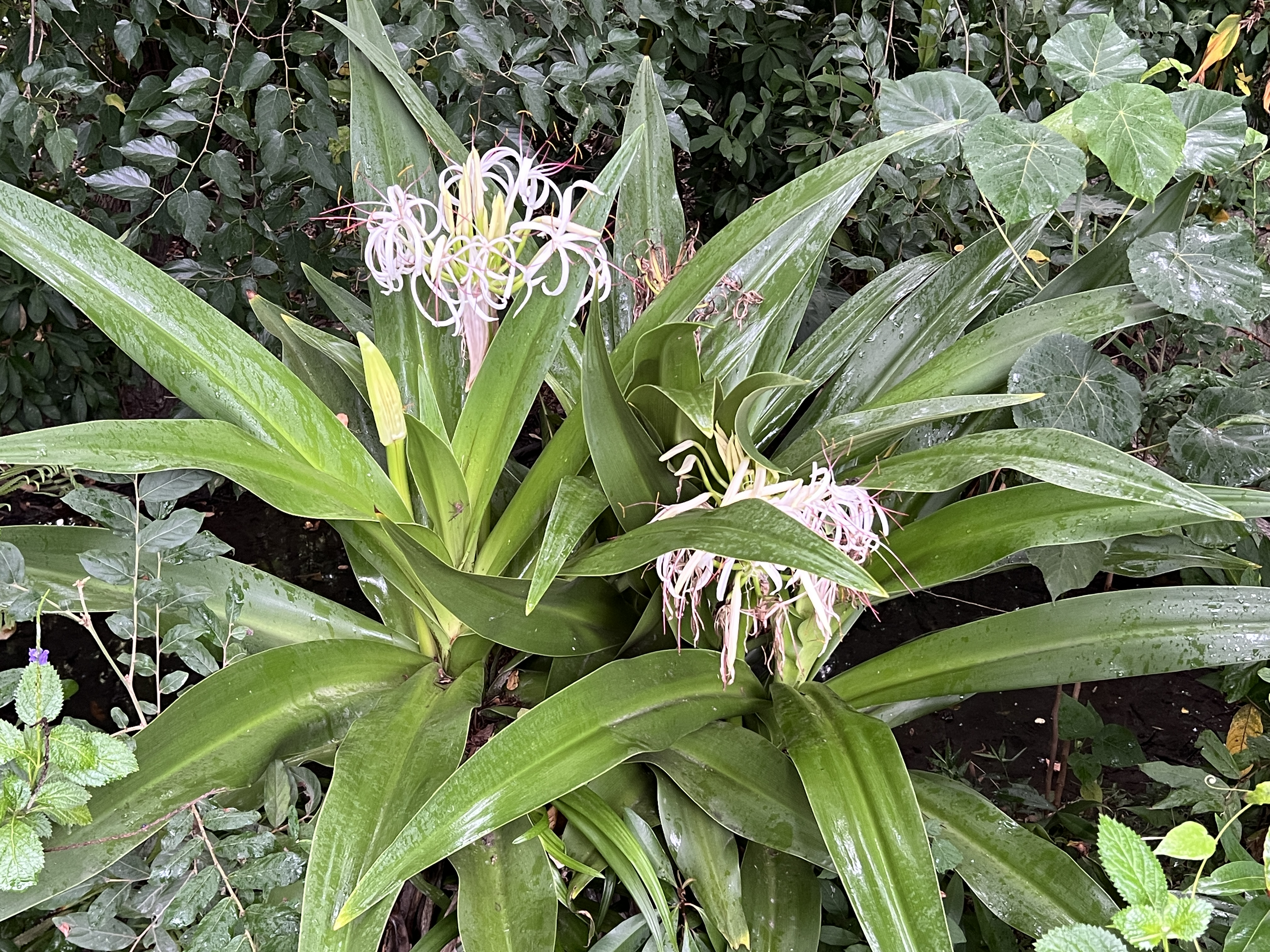
Crinum asiaticum

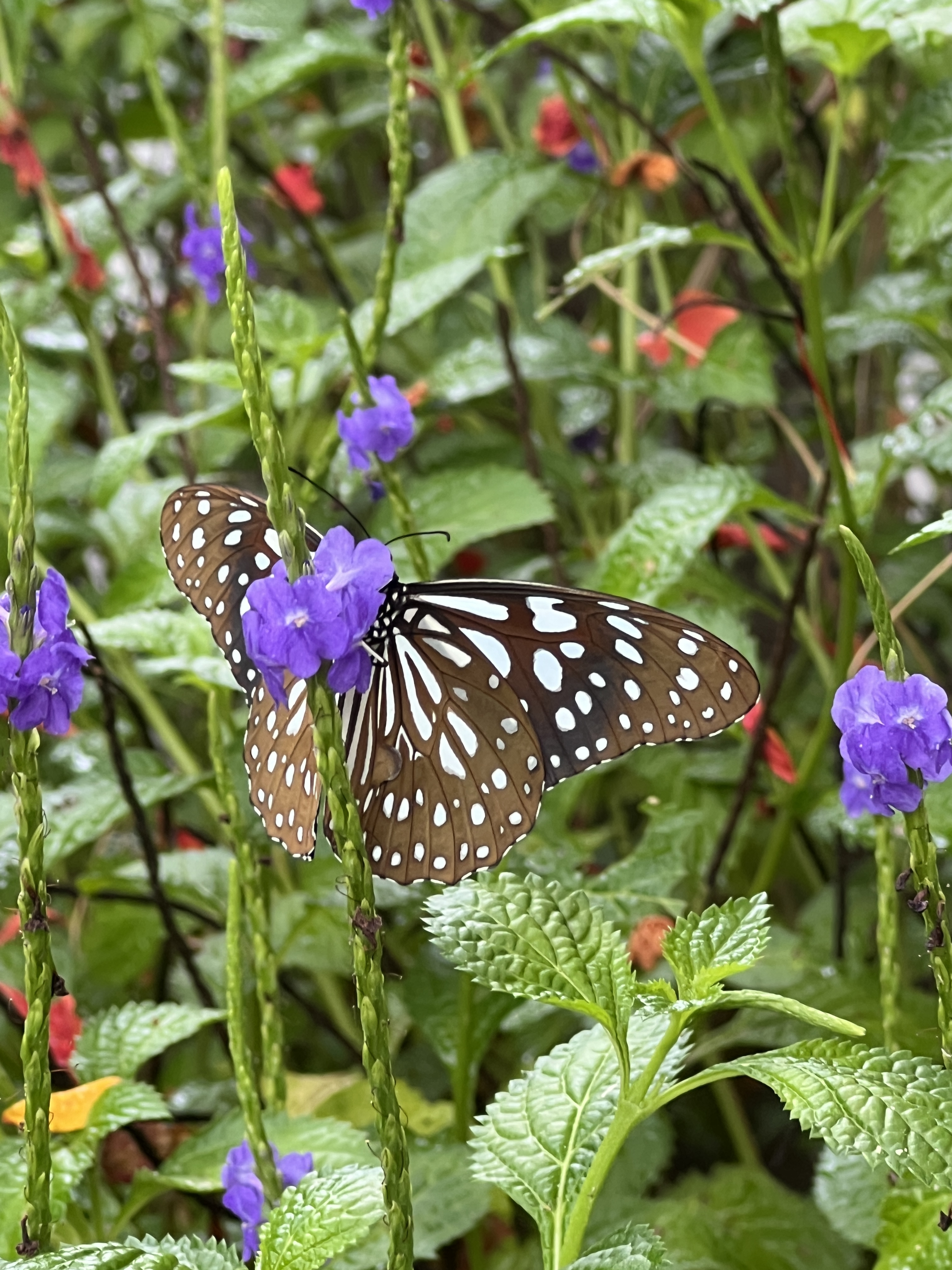
Tirumala limniace

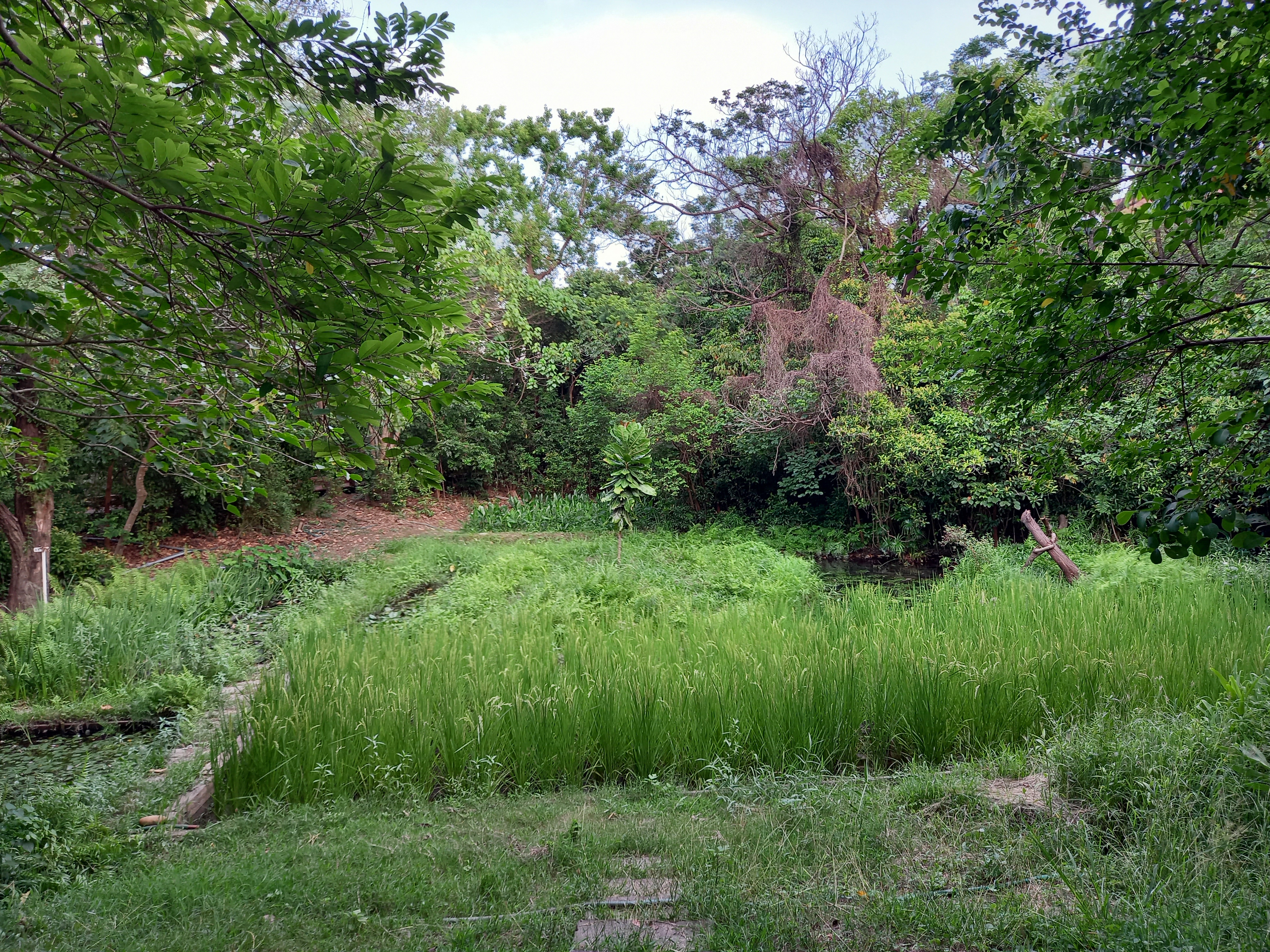
Instructional pond

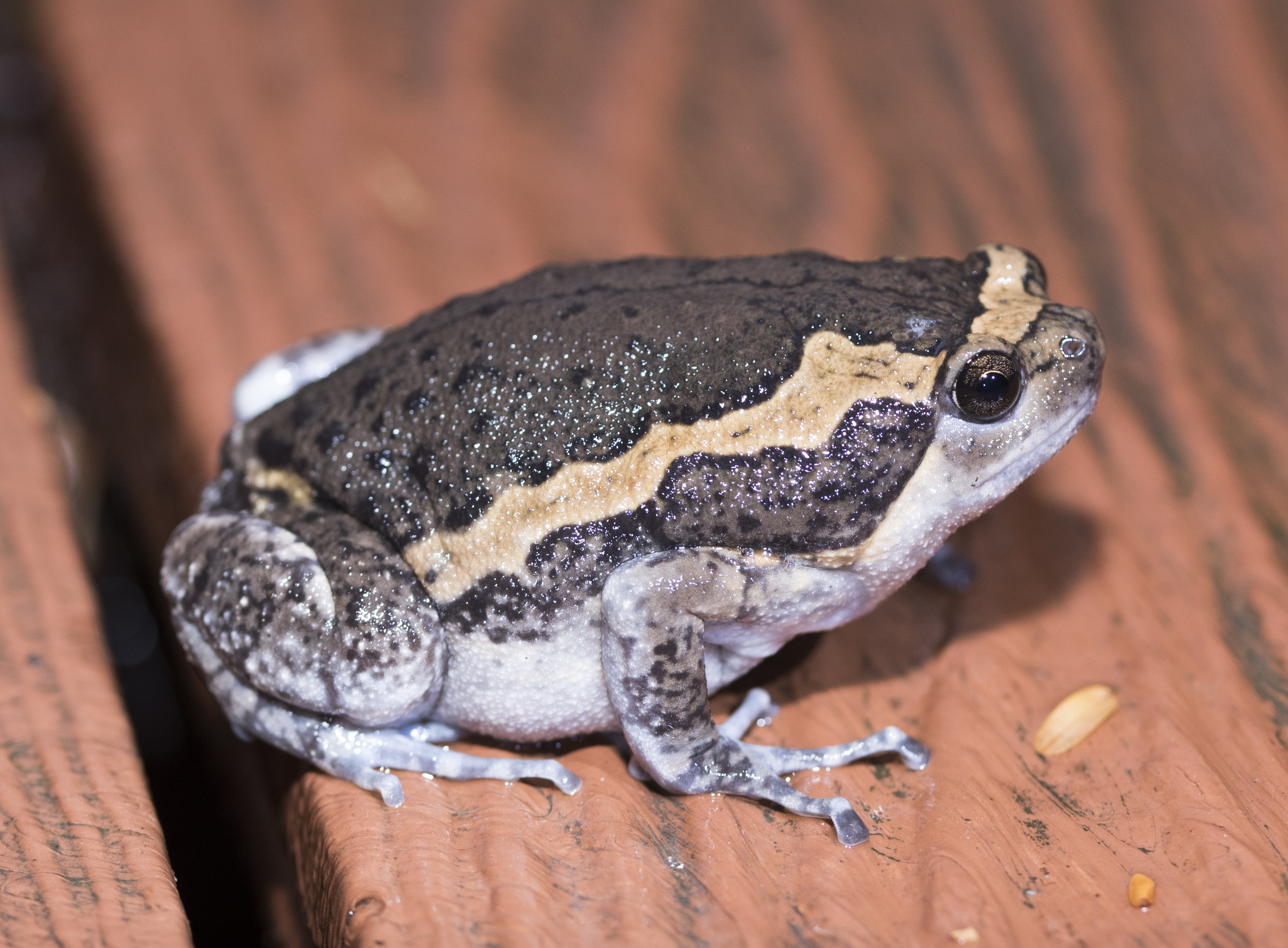
Kaloula pulchra

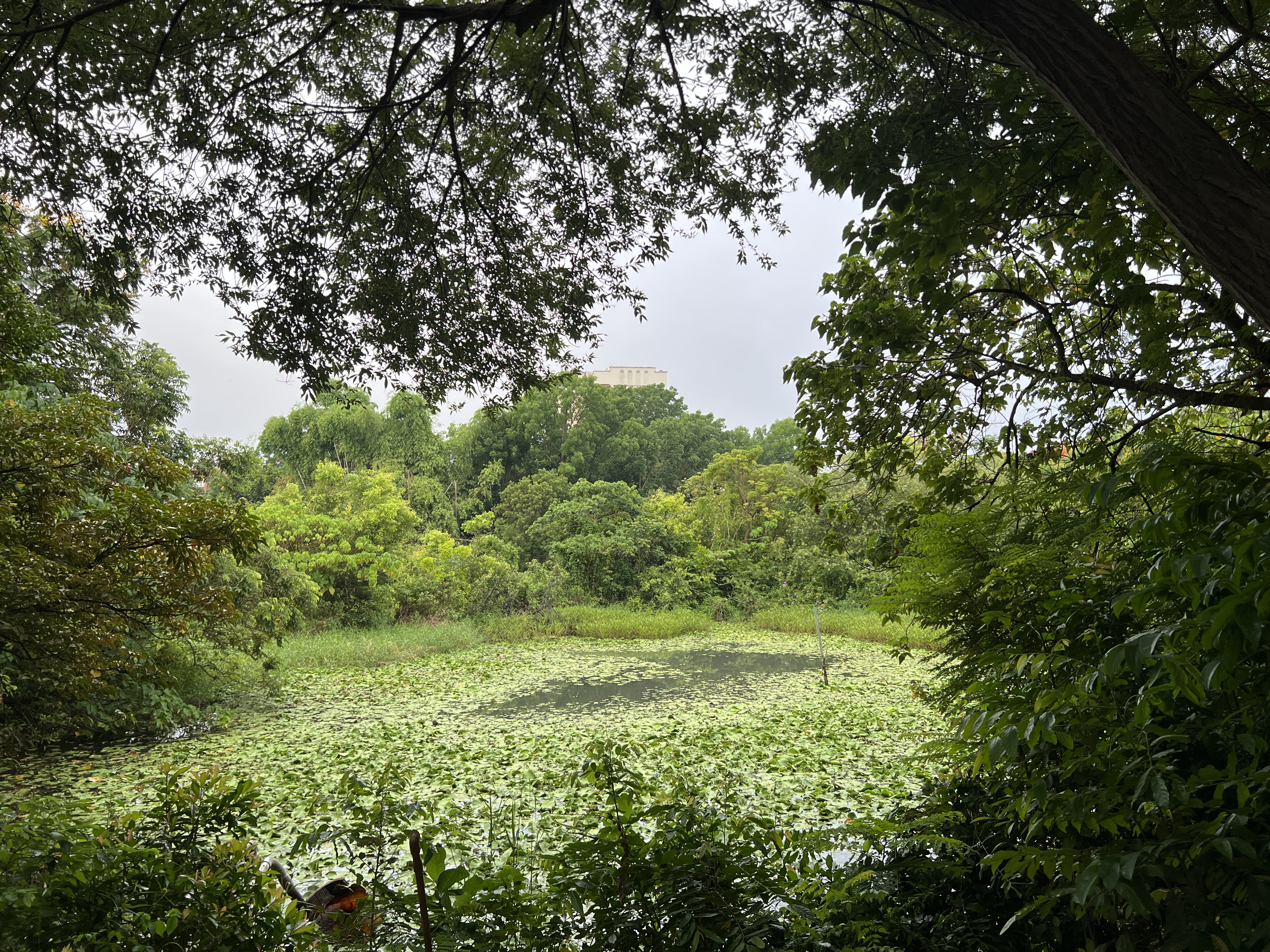
Settling pond

== Events ==
Various events have been held at the park: the Niaosong Wetland Park Eco-festival, Friends of Niaosong Wetland Park, Ecology Volunteer Training of Niaosong Wetland Park, the Propagation Program of Pushing Forward the Protection of Wildlife and Itss Biodiversity in Niaosong Wetland Park, the Propagation Programme of Ecology Protection of Niaosong Wetland Park, the Little Eco-festival of Niaosong Wetland Park, and so on.

== See also ==
- List of parks in Taiwan
