= Field archery at the 2009 World Games – Women's barebow =

Field archery Women's barebow at the 2009 World Games
- Venue: Chengcing Lake, Kaohsiung, Taiwan
- Dates: 24–26 July 2009
- Competitors: 11 from 8 nations

Medalists
gold medal	(Italy) Eleonora Strobbe
silver medal	(France) Christine Gauthé
bronze medal	(Germany) Monika Jentges

The Women's barebow archery competition at the 2009 World Games took place from 24 to 26 July 2009 at the Chengcing Lake in Kaohsiung, Taiwan.

== Competition format ==
A total of 11 archers entered the competition. The best four athletes from preliminary round qualifies to the semifinals.

== Results ==
=== Preliminary round ===
Rank	Archer	Nation	Score	Note
1	Eleonora Strobbe	Italy (ITA)	646	Q
2	Monika Jentges	Germany (GER)	614	Q
3	Christine Gauthé	France (FRA)	591	Q
4	Julie Robinson	United States (USA)	585	Q
5	Luciana Pennacchi	Italy (ITA)	581	
6	Rebecca Nelson-Harris	United States (USA)	567	
7	Victoria Kalmaru	Great Britain (GBR)	564	
8	Anne Viljanen	Finland (FIN)	556	
9	Trudy Scott	Australia (AUS)	556	
10	Manja Conrad	Germany (GER)	545	
11	Lin Mei-ying	Chinese Taipei (TPE)	455	

=== Finals ===
Semifinals
1	Eleonora Strobbe (ITA)	51
4	Julie Robinson (USA)	43
3	Christine Gauthé (FRA)	38
2	Monika Jentges (GER)	34

Finals
1	Eleonora Strobbe (ITA)	52
3	Christine Gauthé (FRA)	45
Third place
4	Julie Robinson (USA)	38
2	Monika Jentges (GER)	41
