= Field archery at the 2009 World Games – Women's compound =

2009 archery competition in Taiwan

Field archery Women's compound at the 2009 World Games
- Venue: Chengcing Lake, Kaohsiung, Taiwan
- Dates: 24–26 July 2009
- Competitors: 16 from 12 nations

Medalists
gold medal	(Austria) Petra Göbel
silver medal	(Netherlands) Ingeborg Enthoven
bronze medal	(Croatia) Ivana Buden

The Women's compound archery competition at the 2009 World Games took place from 24 to 26 July 2009 at the Chengcing Lake in Kaohsiung, Taiwan.

== Competition format ==
A total of 16 archers entered the competition. The best four athletes from preliminary round qualifies to the semifinals.

== Results ==
=== Preliminary round ===
Rank	Archer	Nation	Score	Note
1	Ivana Buden	Croatia (CRO)	781	Q
2	Gladys Willems	Belgium (BEL)	779	Q
3	Ingeborg Enthoven	Netherlands (NED)	775	Q
4	Petra Göbel	Austria (AUT)	767	Q
5	Ulrike Wiese	Germany (GER)	766	
6	Isabell Danielsson	Sweden (SWE)	765	
7	Anne Lantee	Finland (FIN)	756	
8	Malin Johansson	Sweden (SWE)	754	
9	Silke Hoettecke	Germany (GER)	744	
10	Christie Westman	Great Britain (GBR)	741	
11	Roberta Telani	Italy (ITA)	739	
12	Tracey Anderson	Great Britain (GBR)	733	
13	Huang I-jou	Chinese Taipei (TPE)	730	
14	Francoise Volle	France (FRA)	726	
15	Amalia Stucchi	Italy (ITA)	718	
16	Zsofia Gyenge	Hungary (HUN)	629	

=== Finals ===
Semifinals
1	Ivana Buden (CRO)	57
4	Petra Göbel (AUT)	59
3	Ingeborg Enthoven (NED)	60
2	Gladys Willems (BEL)	56

Finals
4	Petra Göbel (AUT)	60
3	Ingeborg Enthoven (NED)	59
Third place
1	Ivana Buden (CRO)	66
2	Gladys Willems (BEL)	63
