= Jufang Hall =

Historical building in Nantou City, Nantou County, Taiwan

- 聚芳館
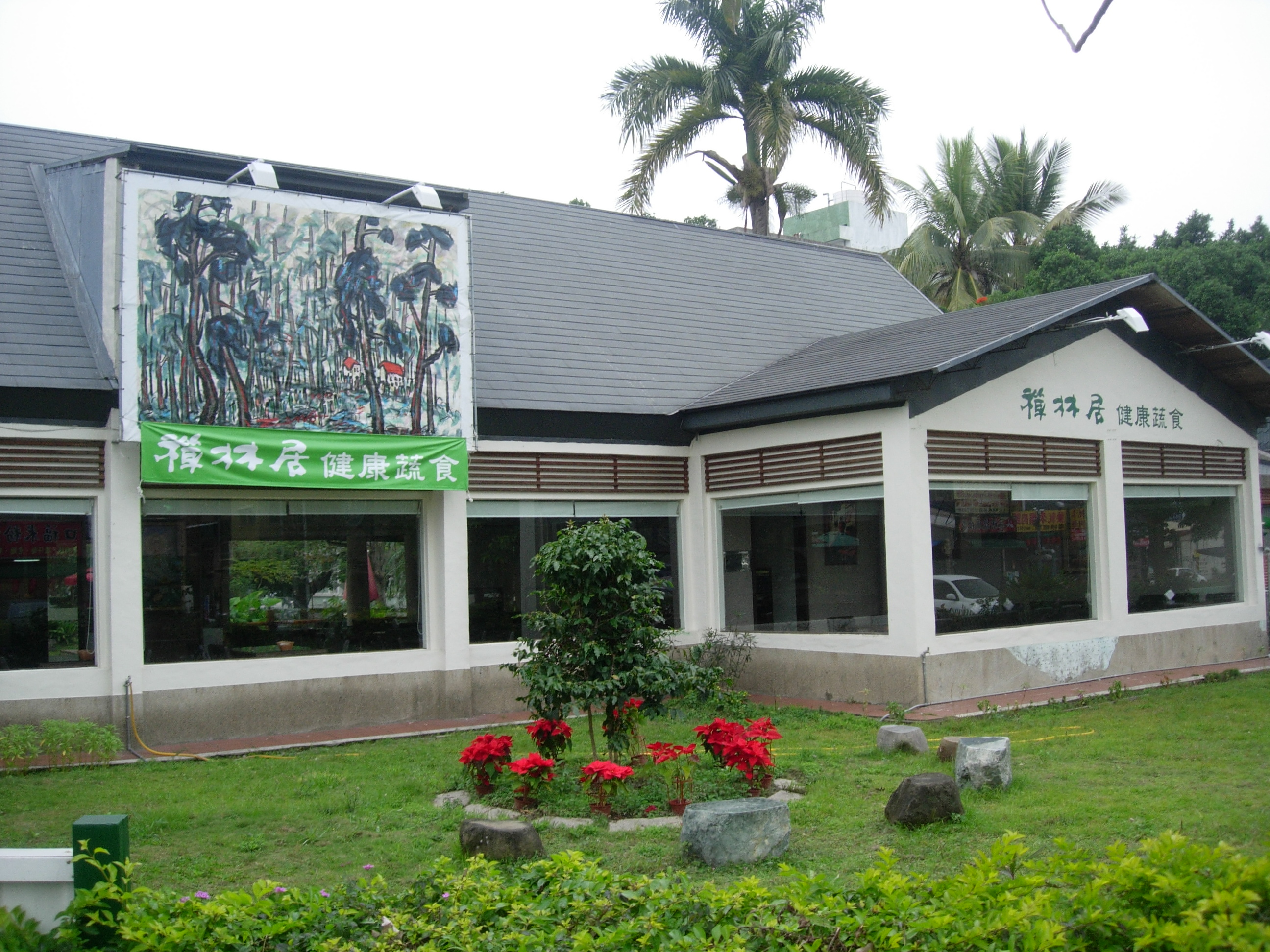
- Interactive map of the Jufang Hall area

General information
- Location: Nantou City, Nantou County, Taiwan
- Coordinates: 23°55′N 120°41′E
- Completed: 1922
- Opened: 27 August 2001

The Jufang Hall (traditional Chinese: 聚芳館; simplified Chinese: 聚芳馆; pinyin: Jùfāng Guǎn) is a historical building in Nantou City, Nantou County, Taiwan.

== History ==
The building was originally built in 1922 as Nantou District Produce Exhibition. In 1945 after World War II, the building was used to station troops and it was also rented out as a hotel. In 1951, the health center of Nantou County began its operation in the building until it was relocated in 1960. The Nantou County Library was then moved to the building until 1982 when Nantou County Culture Center took over its place. In 1983, the hall was renovated by Nantou City Government and set up as Longquan Nursery. The nursery was damaged by the 921 earthquake on 21 September 1999. Soon after that, the Executive Yuan approved an approximate NT$3 million of public facility restoration funds to repair the hall. The building was reopened as Jufang Hall on 27 August 2001.

== Architecture ==
The building was built with a European architecture style.

== See also ==
- List of tourist attractions in Taiwan
