= Hsieh Tung-min =

Taiwanese politician (1908–2001)

- 謝東閔
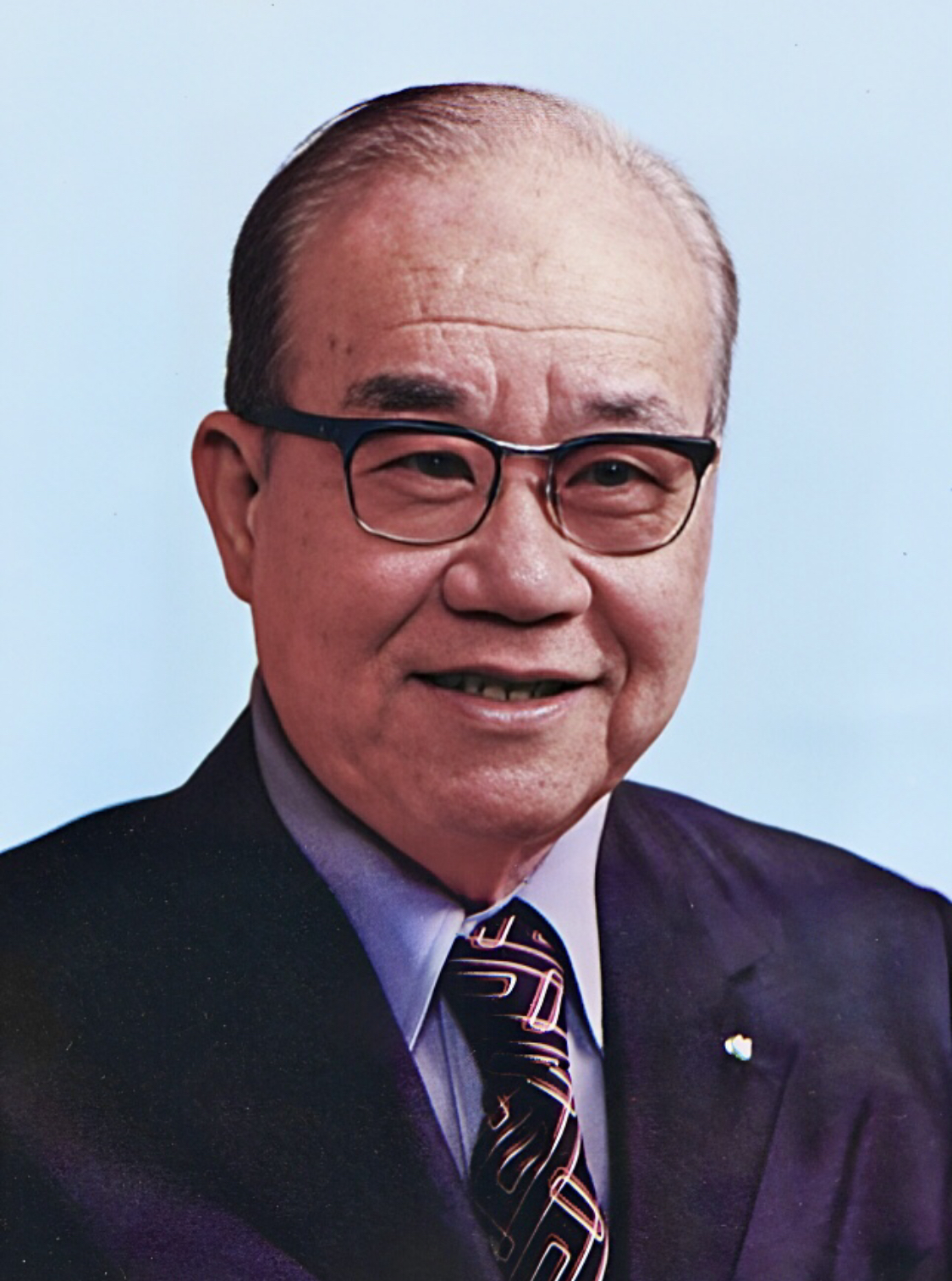

4th Vice President of the Republic of China
- In office 20 May 1978 – 20 May 1984
- President: Chiang Ching-kuo
- Preceded by: Yen Chia-kan
- Succeeded by: Lee Teng-hui

Chairperson of Taiwan Provincial Government
- In office 6 June 1972 – 20 May 1978

Magistrate of Kaohsiung County
- In office 8 January 1946 – 1 October 1947
- Succeeded by: Mao Chen-huan

Personal details
- Born: 25 January 1908 Nisui, Inrin, Taichū Prefecture, Taiwan, Empire of Japan (today Guanghua, Ershui, Changhua County, Taiwan)
- Died: 9 April 2001 (aged 93) Taipei, Taiwan
- Party: Kuomintang
- Education: Sun Yat-sen University (BA)

Shieh Tung-min
- Traditional Chinese: 謝東閔
Transcriptions
Standard Mandarin
- Hanyu Pinyin: Xiè Dōngmǐn
- Wade–Giles: Hsieh4 Tung1-min3
Southern Min
- Hokkien POJ: Siā Tang-bín

Hsieh Tung-min (Chinese: 謝東閔; pinyin: Xiè Dōngmǐn; Wade–Giles: Hsieh^{4} Tung^{1}-min^{3}; Pe̍h-ōe-jī: Siā Tong-bín; 25 January 1908 – 9 April 2001) was a Taiwanese politician who served as the ninth governor of Taiwan Province (1972–1978), the fourth and first local Taiwanese vice president of the Republic of China (1978–1984) under President Chiang Ching-kuo.

== Family and early life ==
Hsieh was born to an ordinary farming family in Taichū Prefecture, Japanese Taiwan. He was educated at Taichung County Taichung Middle School until 1925. He went to Shanghai for tertiary education and later graduated from Sun Yat-sen University in Guangzhou. Afterwards, he became a columnist in Hong Kong and Guangzhou.

== Road into politics ==
Hsieh joined the Kuomintang in 1930.

In 1942, Hsieh was invited to plan the Taiwan office of Kuomintang. From 1943 to 1945, he worked for anti-Japan activities in Guangdong.

In 1945, after 20 and half years in the mainland, he went back to Taiwan as a KMT official. He became the first magistrate of Kaohsiung County in 1948, later vice-director of Education of Taiwan Province, chancellor of National Taiwan Normal University, Secretary of Taiwan Province and Chief Councillor of Taiwan Provincial Council.

== Governor of Taiwan Province ==
Hsieh became the ninth governor of Taiwan Province in 1972. On 10 October 1976, he received a parcel bomb from Wang Sing-nan, at the time a Taiwanese businessman based in the United States. The bomb injured Hsieh's left hand. To prevent sepsis, the hospital decided to amputate his left hand and gave him an prosthetic hand.

== Later political career and death ==
Hsieh became vice president on 20 May 1978. He was replaced by another Taiwanese, Lee Teng-hui, on 20 May 1984. Afterwards Hsieh became senior secretary of the Presidential Office. Hsieh sought treatment from Taipei Veterans General Hospital for a heart attack on 23 January 2001. He later returned to his home in Taipei and died on 9 April 2001. His funeral was held on 22 April 2001.

== Contributions to education in Taiwan ==
On 26 March 1958, Hsieh set up the first private university, the Shih Chien University in Kaohsiung. During his governorship and vice-presidency, he worked hard on educational affairs and success to make all people of the new generations of Taiwan to be educated.

Government offices
| Preceded by Chen Ta-ching | Governor of Taiwan Province; 1972–1978 | Succeeded by Lin Yang-kang |
| Preceded by Yen Chia-kan | Vice President of the Republic of China; 1978–1984 | Succeeded by Lee Teng-hui |
| Preceded by position established | Magistrate of Kaohsiung County; 1946–1947 | Succeeded by Mao Chen-huan |
