= Chen Ta-ching =

Taiwanese politician (1904–1973)

- 陳大慶
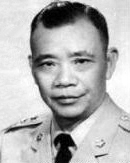

Minister of National Defense of the Republic of China
- In office 1972–1973

8th Governor of Taiwan Province
- In office 1969–1972

Personal details
- Born: 8 October 1904 Chongyi County, Jiangxi, China
- Died: 22 August 1973 (aged 68) Taipei, Taiwan
- Party: Kuomintang

Chen Ta-ching (traditional Chinese: 陳大慶; simplified Chinese: 陈大庆; pinyin: Chén Dàqìng; 8 October 1904 - 22 August 1973) was a Chinese National Revolutionary Army general during the Second Sino-Japanese War and the Chinese Civil War. After the Republic of China government withdrew to Taiwan, he served as Governor of Taiwan Province 1969 to 1972 and the Minister of National Defense from 1972 to 1973 before retiring due to health reasons.

== Biography ==
In 1972, Chen was made Minister of Defense for Taiwan. In June of that year, he was reportedly critically ill and it was suggested that he may have been unable to serve in the position.

He died from cancer in Taipei the following year and was posthumously promoted to colonel general.

Government offices
Preceded by Huang Chieh	Governor of Taiwan Province; 1969–1972	Succeeded by Hsieh Tung-min
Preceded by Huang Chieh	ROC Minister of National Defense; 1972–1973	Succeeded by Gao Kuiyuan
