= Nantou City =

County-administered city in Nantou County, Taiwan

Nantou 南投市 Nantō
- County-administered city
- Nantou City
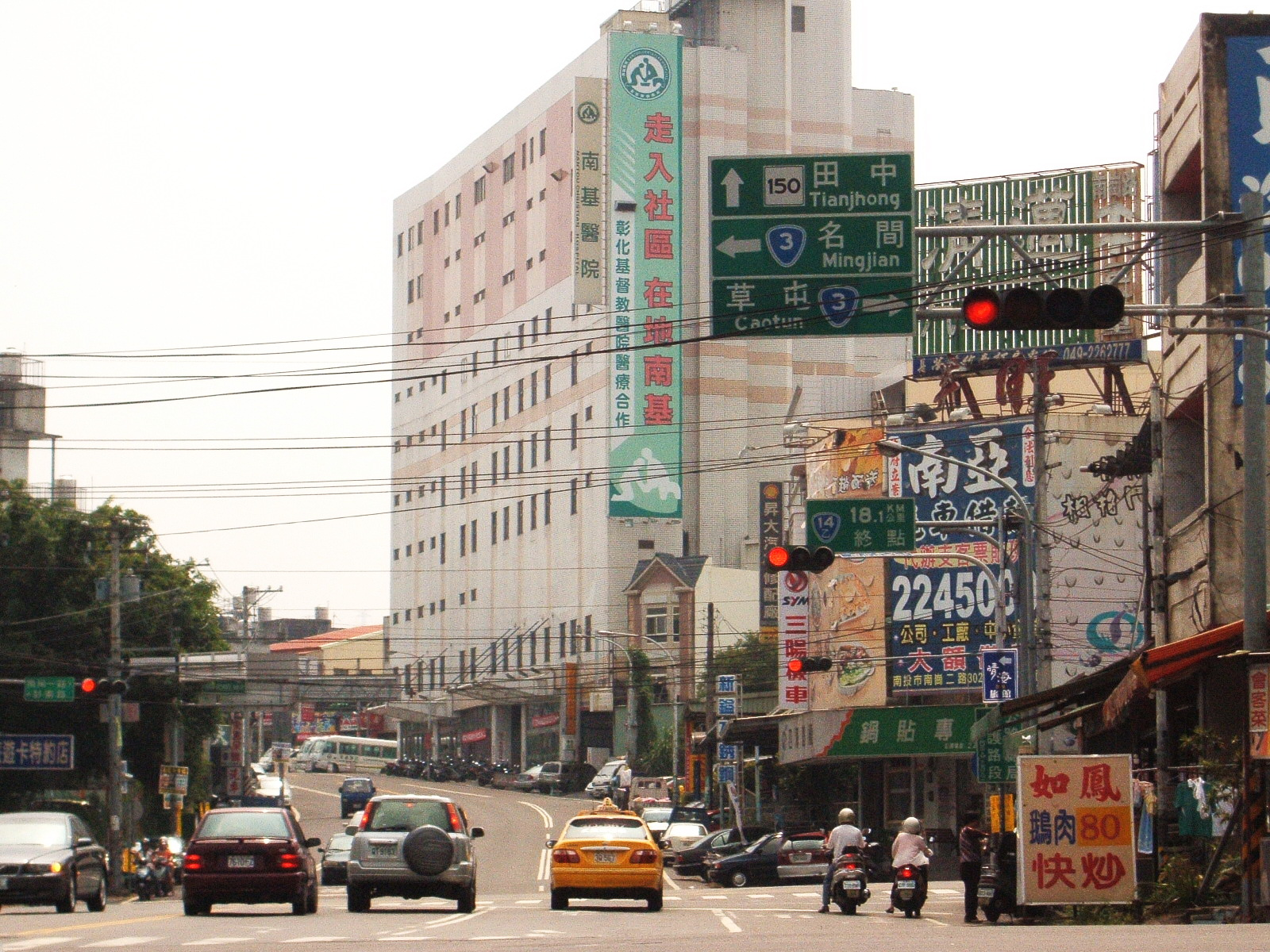
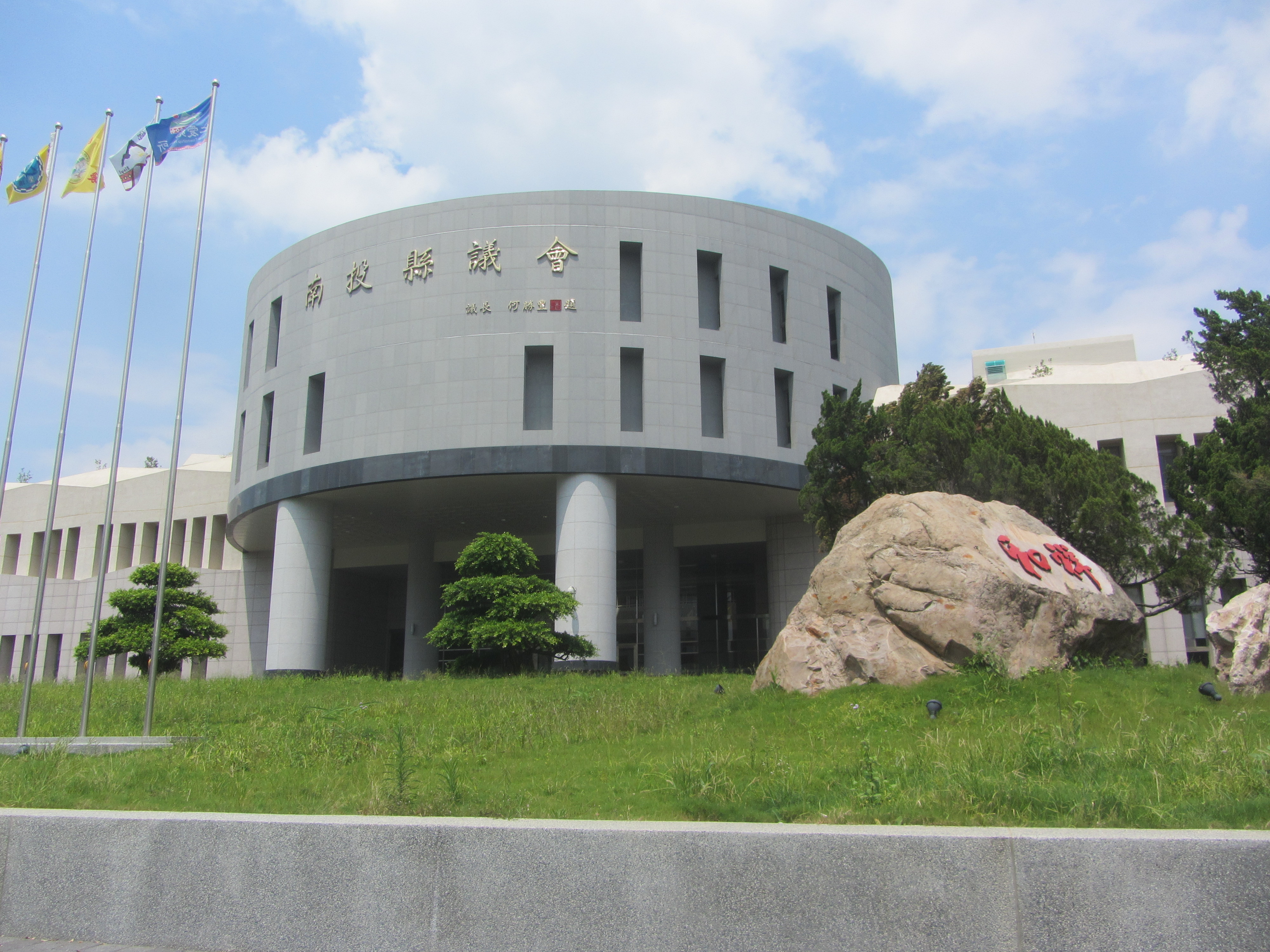
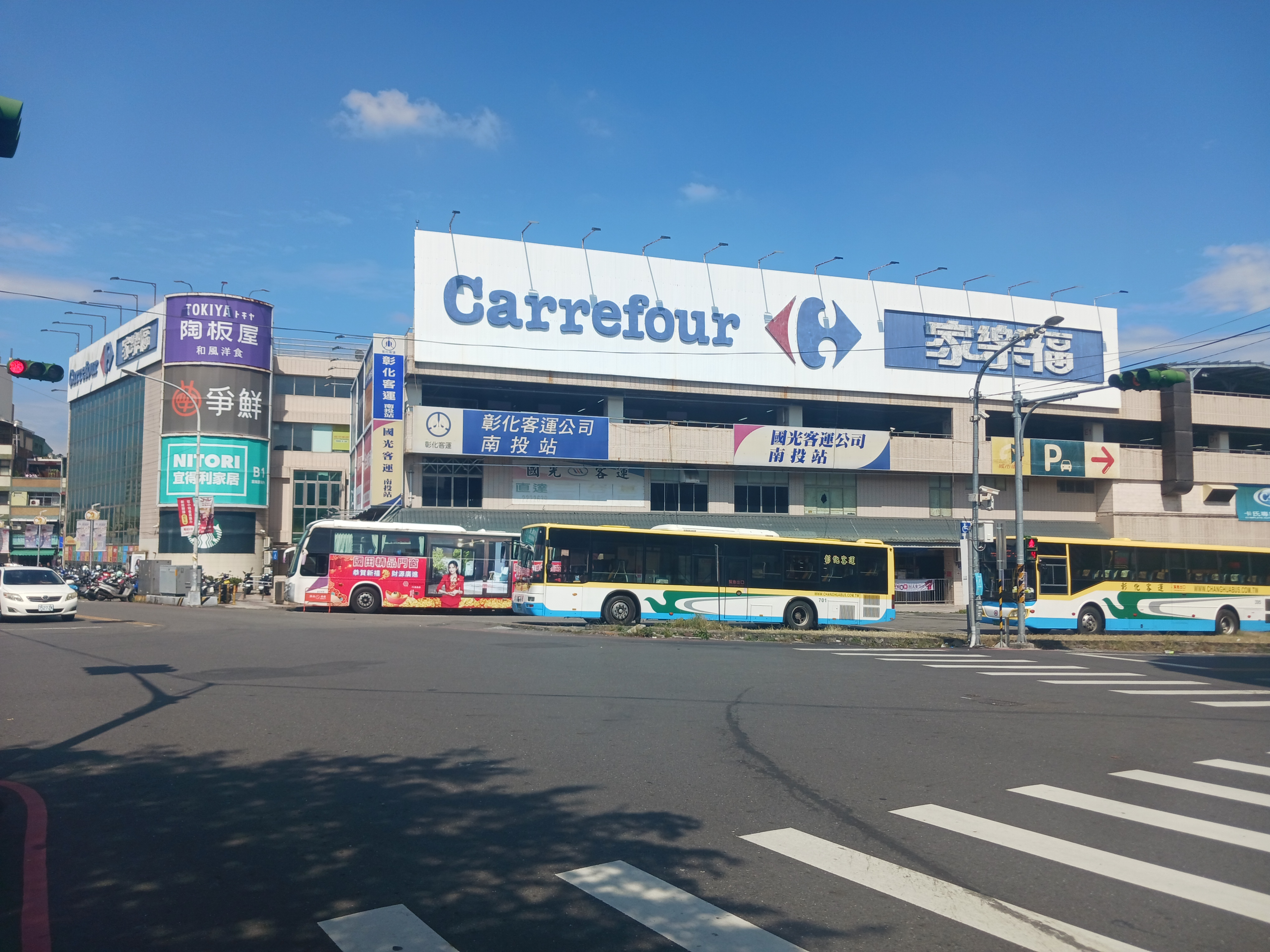
- Clockwise: Downtown Nantou City in August 2008, the Nantou County Council building in June 2014, and the Nantou Bus Station in May 2026.

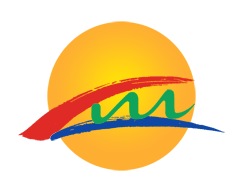
- Seal

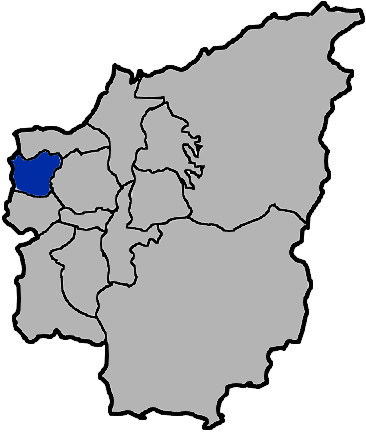
- Coordinates: 23°55′N 120°41′E
- Country: Taiwan
- Province: Taiwan^{a}
- County: Nantou

Government
  - Mayor: Sung Huai-lin

Area
  - Total: 71.2063 km^{2} (27.4929 sq mi)

Population (February 2023)
  - Total: 97,504
- Time zone: UTC+8 (CST)
- Website: http://www.ntc.gov.tw/
- ^{a} In Taiwan, although provinces remain a nominal division according to the Taiwanese constitution, they are no longer considered to have any administrative function practically.

Nantou City
- Chinese: 南投市
Transcriptions
Standard Mandarin
- Hanyu Pinyin: Nántóu Shì
- Bopomofo: ㄋㄢˊ ㄊㄡˊ ㄕˋ
- Gwoyeu Romatzyh: Nantour Shyh
- Wade–Giles: Nan²-tʻou² Shih⁴
- Tongyong Pinyin: Nántóu Shìh
- MPS2: Nántóu Shr̀
- IPA: [nǎn.tʰǒʊ ʂɻ̩̂]
Hakka
- Pha̍k-fa-sṳ: Nàm-thèu-sṳ
Southern Min
- Hokkien POJ: Lâm-tâu-chhī
- Tâi-lô: Lâm-tâu-tshī

Nantou City (Mandarin Pīnyīn: Nántóu Shì; Hokkien POJ: Lâm-tâu-chhī, lit. 'South Tou City') is a county-administered city located in the northwest of Nantou County, Taiwan. It lies between the Bagua Mountains and the Maoluo River and is the county seat of Nantou County. Freeway No. 3 serves Nantou City. Its name is a transliteration of the Hoanya word Ramtau with its first character (南; "south") chosen to complement that of Beitou's (北; "north"), a district in Taipei, even though there is no relation between the aboriginal names.

== History ==
=== Qing Dynasty ===
The Han Chinese began arriving in the area during the reign of the Qianlong Emperor of Qing Dynasty. Members of the Zhang clan from Zhangzhou as well as the Jian (簡), Lin and Xiao clans from Nanjing County in Zhangzhou were among the early settlers. A yamen was established in 1759 near the present Nantou Elementary School. In 1898, Nantou Commandery was organized.

=== Empire of Japan ===
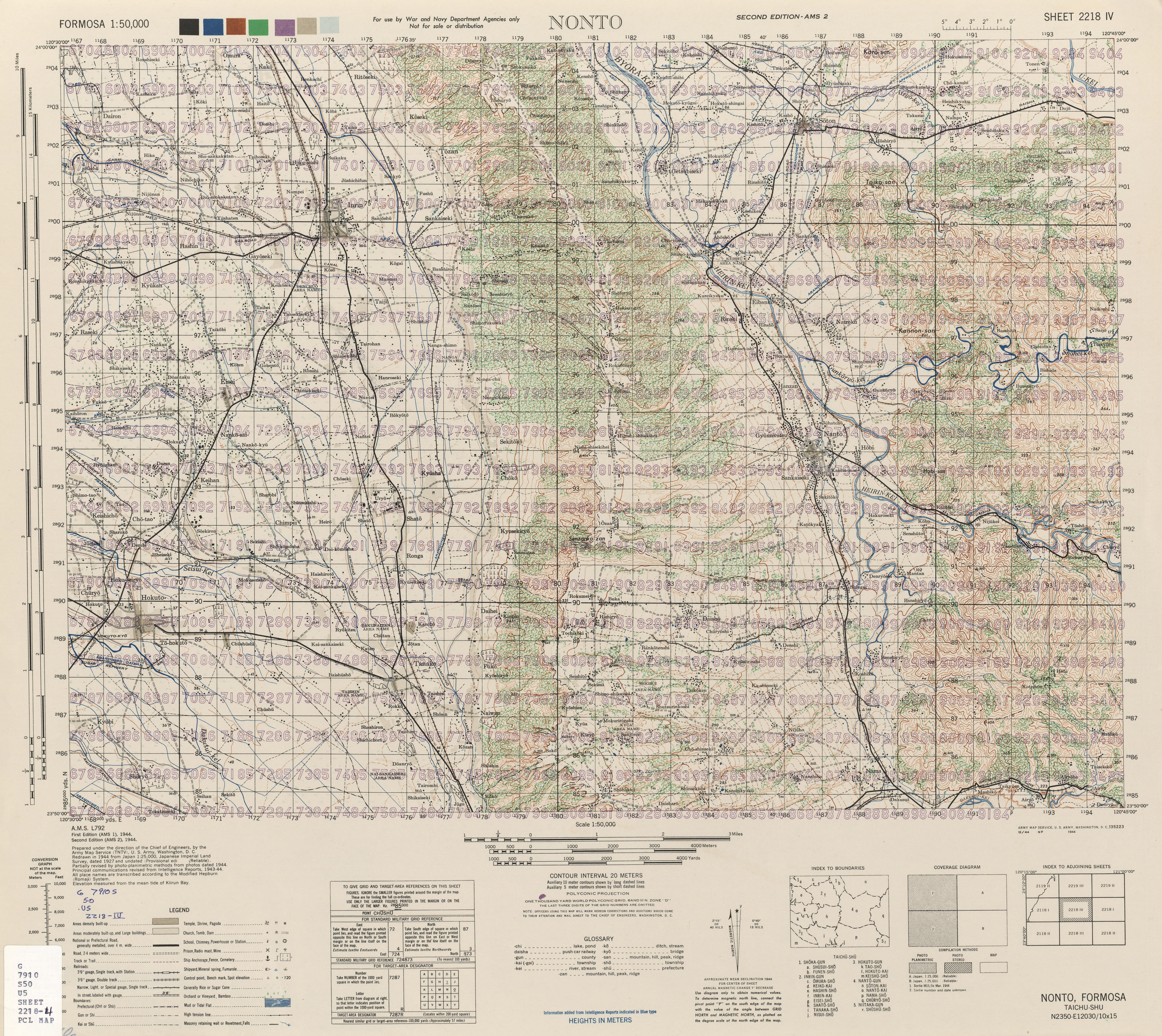
Map of Nantou (labeled as Nantō) and surrounding area (1944)

In 1901, during Japanese rule, Nanto Chō (南投廳) was one of twenty local administrative offices established. In 1909, part of Toroku Chō (斗六廳) was merged into Nanto Chō. In 1920, Nantō Town was governed under Nantō District, Taichū Prefecture.

=== Republic of China ===
After the handover of Taiwan from Japan to the Republic of China in 1945, Nantou County was organized out of Taichung County in 1950, and, in October of the same year, Nantou Township was organized with the county government seated in it. On 1 July 1957, the Taiwan Provincial Government moved to Zhongxing New Village, making Nantou the location of the provincial government. On 25 December 1981, Nantou became a county-administered city from the previous urban township. Due to its location along the Chelungpu Fault, Nantou was strongly affected by the 1999 Jiji earthquake: 92 people died and over 1,000 buildings were damaged

== Economy ==
Nantou City's economy is based on agriculture, tourism, and manufacturing. In 1965, the Nangang Industrial Zone (南崗工業區) was built to balance regional economic and industrial development.

== Administrative divisions ==
Longquan, Kangshou, Sanmin, Renhe, Nantou, Zhangren, Chongwen, Sanxing, Sanhe, Jiaxing, Jiahe, Pinghe, Zhenxing, Qianqiu, Jungong, Tungshan, Yingnan, Yingbei, Neixing, Neixin, Guanghui, Guangrong, Guangming, Guanghua, Zhangxing, Zhanghe, Pingshan, Xinxing, Yongfeng, Fuxing, Fengshan, Yongxing, Fengming and Fushan Village.

== Government institutions ==
- Taiwan Provincial Government
- Nantou County Government
- Nantou County Council

== Tourist attractions ==
- Jufang Hall
- Nantou County Culture Park
- Nantou Peitian Temple
- Nantou Longquan Temple

== Bus stops ==
A bus station in the city is the Nantou Bus Station operated by Changhua Bus.

== Notable people ==
- Chang Chun-hung, member of Taiwan's Legislative Yuan from 1993 to 2005
- Hsu Shu-hua, Mayor of Nantou City from 2006 to 2014
- Hung Jui-chen, Taiwanese tennis player
- Sonia Sui, Taiwanese model and actress

== Climate ==
Climate data for Nantou City, elevation 110 m (360 ft), (2016–2023 normals, extremes 2016–present)
Month	Jan	Feb	Mar	Apr	May	Jun	Jul	Aug	Sep	Oct	Nov	Dec	Year
Record high °C (°F)	30.1 (86.2)	33.9 (93.0)	32.6 (90.7)	33.6 (92.5)	36.1 (97.0)	36.4 (97.5)	37.1 (98.8)	37.3 (99.1)	36.4 (97.5)	36.9 (98.4)	33.3 (91.9)	31.4 (88.5)	37.3 (99.1)
Mean daily maximum °C (°F)	22.9 (73.2)	23.4 (74.1)	26.2 (79.2)	28.8 (83.8)	31.5 (88.7)	33.2 (91.8)	34.3 (93.7)	33.5 (92.3)	33.1 (91.6)	31.0 (87.8)	28.5 (83.3)	24.4 (75.9)	29.2 (84.6)
Daily mean °C (°F)	17.6 (63.7)	18.1 (64.6)	20.8 (69.4)	23.9 (75.0)	27.0 (80.6)	28.3 (82.9)	29.2 (84.6)	28.7 (83.7)	28.2 (82.8)	26.1 (79.0)	23.4 (74.1)	19.3 (66.7)	24.2 (75.6)
Mean daily minimum °C (°F)	14.0 (57.2)	14.3 (57.7)	16.7 (62.1)	20.1 (68.2)	23.4 (74.1)	24.9 (76.8)	25.5 (77.9)	25.4 (77.7)	24.8 (76.6)	22.7 (72.9)	19.8 (67.6)	15.7 (60.3)	20.6 (69.1)
Record low °C (°F)	3.7 (38.7)	5.8 (42.4)	9.3 (48.7)	11.2 (52.2)	15.9 (60.6)	22.8 (73.0)	23.3 (73.9)	22.9 (73.2)	20.9 (69.6)	15.3 (59.5)	12.5 (54.5)	6.0 (42.8)	3.7 (38.7)
Average precipitation mm (inches)	44.3 (1.74)	30.4 (1.20)	77.4 (3.05)	83.6 (3.29)	199.7 (7.86)	456.9 (17.99)	305.4 (12.02)	329.8 (12.98)	149.8 (5.90)	27.1 (1.07)	22.4 (0.88)	27.1 (1.07)	1,753.8 (69.05)
Average precipitation days	6.1	5.1	7.4	7.2	10.0	17.1	13.8	16.7	9.3	3.3	2.9	3.1	102
Average relative humidity (%)	78.4	76.5	76.2	76.0	78.0	79.0	76.7	80.2	77.8	75.7	76.5	76.3	77.3
Source 1: Central Weather Administration
Source 2: Atmospheric Science Research and Application Databank (precipitation days and humidity 2015–2024)
