= Huang Chieh =

Taiwanese politician and general (1902–1995)

- 黃杰
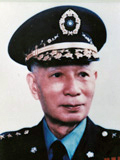

Minister of National Defense of the Republic of China
- In office 1 July 1969 – 31 May 1972
- Preceded by: Chiang Ching-Kuo
- Succeeded by: Chen Ta-ching

7th Governor of Taiwan Province
- In office 1 December 1962 – 5 July 1969
- Preceded by: Chow Chih-jou
- Succeeded by: Chen Ta-ching

Personal details
- Born: 2 November 1902 Changsha, Hunan, China
- Died: 14 January 1995 (aged 92) Taipei, Taiwan
- Party: Kuomintang
- Nickname: Su Wu on Sea

Military service
- Allegiance: Republic of China

Huang Chieh (Chinese: 黃杰; pinyin: Huáng Jié; Wade–Giles: Huang^{2} Chieh^{2}; 2 November 1902 – 14 January 1995) was a National Revolutionary Army general during the Second Sino-Japanese War and the Chinese Civil War. He was considered one of the best generals and administrators in Taiwan's Kuomintang regime.

He was commissioned into the Cavalry Branch as a graduate of the first class of Whampoa Military Academy in 1922. As a young Major, he studied at the Prussian Military Academy in Germany between 1929 and 1930, qualifying the main General Staff Course. After mainland China fell under the control of the Chinese Communist Party in 1949, General Huang led 30,000 Republic of China Army soldiers to Vietnam and they were stationed at Phu Quoc Island. Later, the army moved to Taiwan in June 1953. There is currently a small island in Chengcing Lake that was constructed in November 1955 and named Phu Quoc Island (富國島) in memory of the fleeing Chinese soldiers in 1949.

Huang was Governor of Taiwan Province from 1962 to 1969 and the ROC Minister of Defense from 1969 to 1972. He was fluent in German, French and Russian.

Government offices
Preceded by Chow Chih-jou	Governor of Taiwan Province; 1962–1969	Succeeded by Chen Ta-ching
Preceded by Chiang Ching-kuo	ROC Minister of Defense; 1969–1972	Succeeded by Chen Ta-ching
