= Futai Brigade =

Chinese Nationalist troops in Vietnam

- 富台部隊
- Flag of the Republic of China Army
- Active: 1949–1953
- Country: Republic of China
- Size: 30,000

Commanders
- General: Huang Chieh

Futai Brigade
- Traditional Chinese: 富臺部隊
- Simplified Chinese: 富台部队
Transcriptions
Standard Mandarin
- Hanyu Pinyin: Fùtái bùduì
- Wade–Giles: Fu4-t'ai2 pu4-tui4

The "Futai Brigade" is the informal name for a group of Republic of China Army troops that retreated from mainland China in 1949 at the end of the Chinese Civil War to the French-associated State of Vietnam. They were led by General Huang Chieh France interned the brigade at Phú Quốc and did not release it until 1953. The brigade arrived in Taiwan in July 1953.

The brigade consisted of 30,000 troops and their dependants led by General Huang Chieh. It began retreating from Hunan for Yunnan. The People's Republic of China took control of Yunnan ahead of brigade, forcing the brigade to cross into Vietnam in late-1949. The troops expected to be shipped to Taiwan by December 1949, but were instead interned. France and the United States negotiated for their release; the US refused to provide additional aid to France in return for their release. In January 1952, following the death of Jean de Lattre de Tassigny, France and the ROC agreed to return the troops to Taiwan, although additional negotiations and planning took another year. The troops arrived in Taiwan in July 1953.

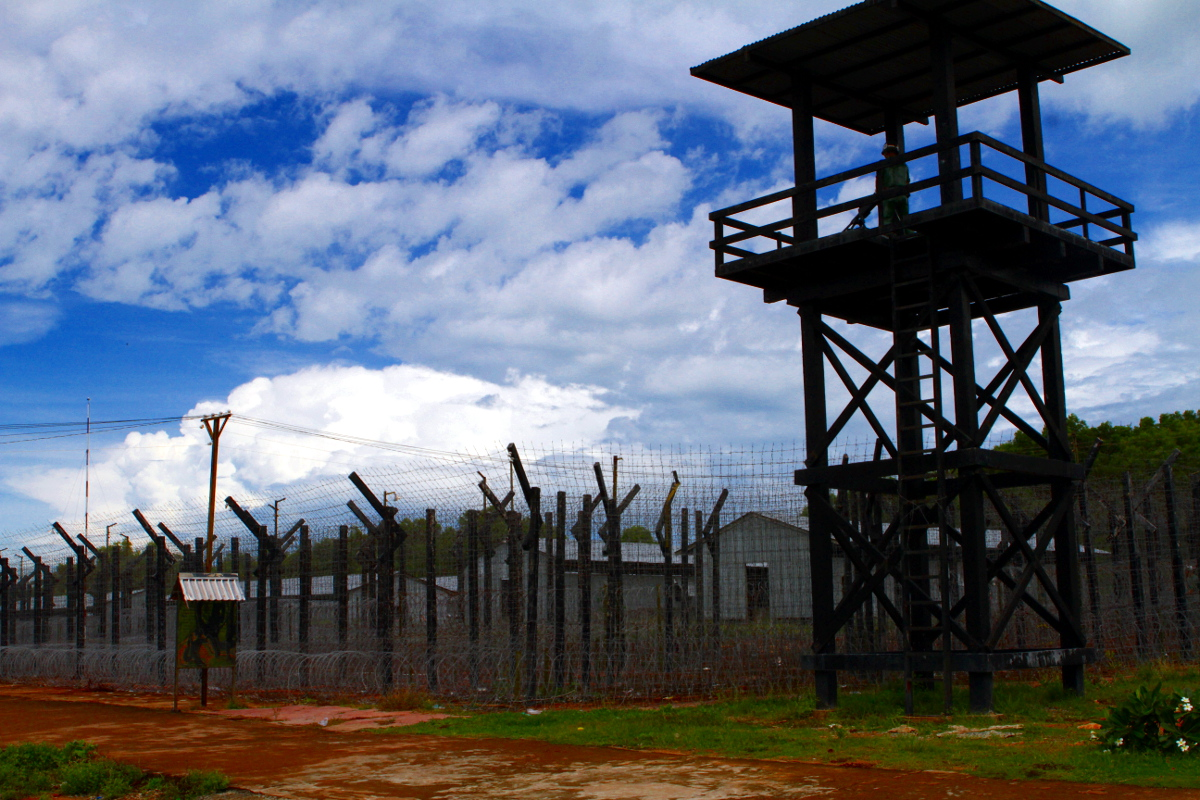
The South Vietnam Phu Quoc prison, created from the French internment camp for the Futai Brigade.

After the departure of the ROC troops, the French used the internment camp to house prisoners of war. South Vietnam converted the camp into a prison, which later held political prisoners. The prison became a "special national monument" in 1995 and became a museum.
