= Niaosong District =

District in Kaohsiung, Taiwan

Coordinates: 22.661225°N 120.372364°E

Niaosong 鳥松區 Torimatsu
- District
- Niaosong District
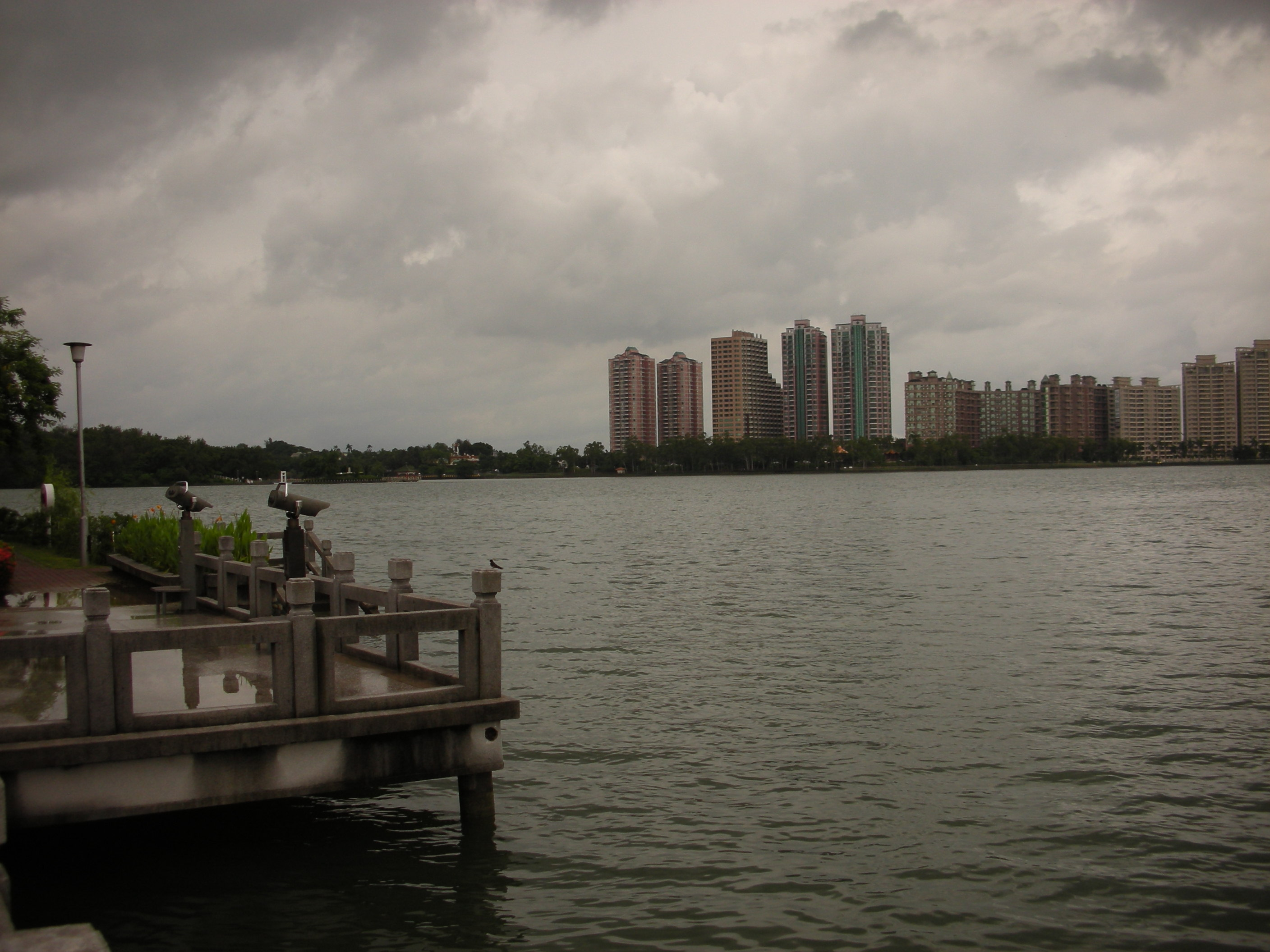

- Niaosong District in Kaohsiung City
- Country: Taiwan
- Region: Southern Taiwan

Population (October 2023)
  - Total: 44,469
- Website: niaosong-en.kcg.gov.tw

Niaosong District (Chinese: 鳥松區; pinyin: Niǎosōng Qū; Wade–Giles: Niao^{3}-sung^{1} Ch'ü^{1}) is a rural district of Kaohsiung City, Taiwan.

== History ==
After the handover of Taiwan from Japan to the Republic of China in 1945, Niaosong was organized as a rural township of Kaohsiung County. On 25 December 2010, Kaohsiung County was merged with Kaohsiung City and Niaosong was upgraded to a district of the city.

== Geography ==
It has 44,469 inhabitants in October 2023.

== Administrative divisions ==
The district consists of Diaosong, Mengli, Dahua, Dipu, Renmei, Dazhu and Huamei Village.

== Government institutions ==
- Radiation Monitoring Center

== Education ==
- Cheng Shiu University

== Tourist attractions ==
- Chengcing Lake
- Chengcing Lake Baseball Stadium
- Dharma Drum Mountain Zi Yun Temple (法鼓山紫云寺)
- Kaohsiung Grand Hotel
- Niaosong Wetland Park

== Notable natives ==
- Huang Shihui, writer

== See also ==
- District (Taiwan)
