= Taiwan Provincial Government =

1945–2018 government of Taiwan Province of the Republic of China

- 臺灣省政府; Táiwān Shěng Zhèngfǔ (Mandarin); Tâi-oân Séng Chèng-hú (Taiwanese); Thòi-vân Sén Chṳn-fú (Hakka)
- Seal of Taiwan Province

Agency overview
- Formed: 1 September 1945 (as Office of the Chief Executive); 16 May 1947 (as Provincial Government)
- Preceding agency: Government-General of Taiwan, Empire of Japan
- Dissolved: 20 July 2018 (de facto)
- Superseding agency: National Development Council
- Jurisdiction: Taiwan Province
- Parent agency: Executive Yuan
- Website: www.tpg.gov.tw

Taiwan Provincial Government
- Traditional Chinese: 臺灣省政府
Transcriptions
Standard Mandarin
- Hanyu Pinyin: Táiwān Shěng Zhèngfǔ
- Wade–Giles: T'ai^{2}-wan^{1} Shêng^{3} Chêng^{4}-fu^{3}
Hakka
- Pha̍k-fa-sṳ: Thòi-vân Sén Chṳn-fú
Southern Min
- Hokkien POJ: Tâi-oân Séng Chèng-hú
- Tâi-lô: Tâi-uân Síng Tsìng-hú

Taiwan Provincial Government is the nominal government of Taiwan Province in the Republic of China. Since 2018, its functions have been transferred to the National Development Council and other ministries of the Executive Yuan.

== History ==
At the end of World War II, Japan surrendered on August 15, 1945. The Nationalist government started the process to take over Taiwan on behalf of the Allies. The Taiwan Provincial Administrative Office was established by the Executive Yuan in Chungking on September 1, 1945. The office moved to Taipei on October 25, 1945. After the February 28 incident in 1947, the Executive Yuan decided to restructure the Provincial Administrative Office as a provincial government. On May 16, 1947, the Taiwan Provincial Government was established.

As the Republic of China progressively lost control of mainland China to Communist Party forces in the late 1940s and early 1950s, the national government relocated to Taiwan in late 1949. However, Taiwan continued to be governed by a provincial government even though from 1955 it was one of only two provincial governments still functioning (the other being Fujian province, controlling some islands off the mainland coast). The remainder of Fujian province still under Republic of China control was placed under military administration in 1956, and its provincial government was downsized and relocated to Taiwan island. This left Taiwan province as the only fully functioning provincial government. From 1967, a number of major cities in Taiwan were elevated to special municipalities directly controlled by the national government, and moved outside the jurisdiction of Taiwan province.

During the constitutional reform initiated in 1996, the ROC authorities decided to downsize the provincial structure due to the reasons that to solve the problem of overlapping personnel and administrative resources between the provincial and central governments, and cut excessive public spending. The provinces were streamlined and ceased to be self-governing bodies in December 1998, with their administrative functions transferred to the National Development Council and other ministries of the Executive Yuan as well as second-tier local governments such as counties. However, the position of the Chairman of the Provincial Government and Taiwan Provincial Consultative Council are retained to comply with the Constitution.

In July 2018, all provincial governmental organs were formally abolished, with budget and personnel removed.

== Historical government buildings ==
Historically, before the provincial government's duties and functions were handed to the Executive Yuan in July 2018, the provincial government was located in Taipei from 1947 to 1956, and in Zhongxing New Village from 1957 to July 2018.

Order	First	Second
Location	Ch'êng-chung, Taipei City (now Zhongzheng, Taipei)	Zhongxing New Village, Nantou City, Nantou County
Date in use	May 1947 to 1956	1957 to July 2018
Photo		
Notes	Currently the Executive Yuan building	Currently the Office of the Zhongxing New Village Revitalization Project, National Development Council

== Governor of Taiwan ==
=== Official titles of the governor ===
Year	Full title			Literal meaning	Notes
Year	Chinese	Mandarin (Pinyin)	Hokkien (Pe̍h-ōe-jī)	Literal meaning	Notes
1945–1947	臺灣省 行政長官	Táiwānshěng; Xíngzhèng; Zhǎngguān	Tâi-oân-séng; Hêng-chèng; Tióng-Kuaⁿ	Chief Executive of Taiwan Province	The position of Chief Executive was temporarily part of the Executive Yuan as specified in the Taiwan Provincial Administrative Executive Office Organizational Outline (臺灣省行政長官公署組織條例 Táiwān-shěng xíngzhèng zhǎngguān gōngshǔ zǔzhī tiáolì) of September 20, 1945.
1947–1994	臺灣省政府 主席	Táiwānshěng; Zhèngfǔ Zhǔxí	Tâi-oân-séng; Chèng-hú Chú-se̍k	Chairman of Taiwan; Provincial Government	After the February 28 Incident, the Administrative Executive Office was reorganized as a provincial government. The title was often abbreviated as 省主席 shěngzhǔxí.
1994–1998	臺灣省 省長	Táiwānshěng; Shěngzhǎng	Tâi-oân-séng; Séng-tiúⁿ	Governor of Taiwan Province	During the democratic reforms, the title "Governor" was first legally used in the Self-Governance Law for Provinces and Counties (省縣自治法) of July 29, 1994. The governor was directly elected by the people of the province.
1998–2018	臺灣省政府 主席	Táiwānshěng; Zhèngfǔ Zhǔxí	Tâi-oân-séng; Chèng-hú Chú-se̍k	Chairman of Taiwan; Provincial Government	Since the streamlining of the Taiwan Provincial Government in 1998, the government was headed by a provincial council of nine members, including one chairperson, all of which were appointed by the President. Since July 2018, no council members nor chairpersons were appointed.

=== List of governors ===
All governors of Taiwan Province are codified in Chapter XI, Article 113, Section 2 of the constitution.

Kuomintang Non-partisan/ unknown Democratic Progressive Party

==== Chief Executive ====
№	Portrait	Name (Birth–Death)	Term of office		Political party
1		Chen Yi 陳儀; Chén Yí (1883–1950)	August 29, 1945	April 22, 1947	Kuomintang
==== Chairperson of the Provincial Government ====
№	Portrait	Name (Birth–Death)	Term of office		Political party
1		Wei Tao-ming 魏道明; Wèi Dàomíng (1899–1978)	May 16, 1947	January 5, 1949	Kuomintang
2		Chen Cheng 陳誠; Chén Chéng (1897–1965)	January 5, 1949	December 21, 1949	Kuomintang
3		K. C. Wu 吳國楨; Wú Guózhēn (1903–1984)	December 21, 1949	April 16, 1953	Kuomintang
4		Yu Hung-chun 俞鴻鈞; Yú Hóngjūn (1897–1960)	April 16, 1953	June 7, 1954	Kuomintang
5		Yen Chia-kan (C.K. Yen) 嚴家淦; Yán Jiāgàn (1905–1993)	June 7, 1954	August 16, 1957	Kuomintang
6		Chow Chih-jou 周至柔; Zhōu Zhìróu (1899–1986)	August 16, 1957	December 1, 1962	Kuomintang
7		Huang Chieh 黃杰; Huáng Jié (1902–1995)	December 1, 1962	July 5, 1969	Kuomintang
8		Chen Ta-ching 陳大慶; Chén Dàqìng (1904–1973)	July 5, 1969	June 6, 1972	Kuomintang
9		Hsieh Tung-min 謝東閔; Xiè Dōngmǐn (1908–2001)	June 6, 1972	May 20, 1978	Kuomintang
—		Chu Shao-hwa 瞿韶華; Qú Sháohuá (1914–1996)	May 20, 1978	June 11, 1978	Kuomintang
—		Chu Shao-hwa 瞿韶華; Qú Sháohuá (1914–1996)	As acting; Secretary General of the Provincial Government.		
10		Lin Yang-kang 林洋港; Lín Yánggǎng (1927–2013)	June 12, 1978	December 5, 1981	Kuomintang
11		Lee Teng-hui 李登輝; Lǐ Dēnghuī (1923–2020)	December 5, 1981	May 20, 1984	Kuomintang
—		Liu Chao-tien 劉兆田; Liú Zhàotián	May 20, 1984	June 8, 1984	Kuomintang
—		Liu Chao-tien 劉兆田; Liú Zhàotián	As acting; Secretary General of the Provincial Government.		
12		Chiu Chuang-huan 邱創煥; Qīu Chuànghuàn (1925–2020)	June 9, 1984	June 16, 1990	Kuomintang
13		Lien Chan 連戰; Lián Zhàn (1936–)	June 16, 1990	February 25, 1993	Kuomintang
—		Tu Teh-chi 凃德錡; Tú Déqí	February 27, 1993	March 19, 1993	Kuomintang
—		Tu Teh-chi 凃德錡; Tú Déqí	As acting; Secretary General of the Provincial Government.		
14		James Soong 宋楚瑜; Sòng Chǔyú (1942–)	March 20, 1993	December 20, 1994	Kuomintang
==== Governor ====
№	Portrait	Name (Birth–Death)	Term of office		Political party
1		James Soong 宋楚瑜; Sòng Chǔyú (1942–)	December 20, 1994	December 21, 1998	Kuomintang
==== Chairperson of the Provincial Government ====
№	Portrait	Name (Birth–Death)	Term of office		Political party
15		Chao Shou-po 趙守博; Zhào Shǒubó (1941–)	December 21, 1998	May 2, 2000	Kuomintang
—		Chiang Ching-hsien 江清馦; Jiāng Qīngxiān (1942–2018)	May 2, 2000	May 19, 2000	Independent
—		Chiang Ching-hsien 江清馦; Jiāng Qīngxiān (1942–2018)	As acting; Secretary General of the Provincial Government.		
16		Chang Po-ya 張博雅; Zhāng Bóyă (1942–)	May 20, 2000	February 1, 2002	Independent
16		Chang Po-ya 張博雅; Zhāng Bóyă (1942–)	First female chairperson. Concurrently held post of Minister of the Interior.		
17		Fan Kuang-chun 范光群; Fàn Guāngqún (1939–)	February 1, 2002	October 7, 2003	Democratic Progressive Party
18		Lin Kuang-hua 林光華; Lín Guānghuá (1945–)	October 13, 2003	January 25, 2006	Democratic Progressive Party
—		Jeng Peir-fuh 鄭培富; Zhèng Péifù	January 25, 2006	December 7, 2007	Independent
—		Jeng Peir-fuh 鄭培富; Zhèng Péifù	As acting; Secretary General of the Provincial Government.		
19		Lin Hsi-yao 林錫耀; Lín Xíyào (1961–)	December 7, 2007	May 19, 2008	Democratic Progressive Party
19		Lin Hsi-yao 林錫耀; Lín Xíyào (1961–)	Concurrently held post of Minister Without Portfolio.		
20		Tsai Hsun-hsiung 蔡勳雄; Cài Xūnxióng (1941–)	May 20, 2008	September 10, 2009	Kuomintang
20		Tsai Hsun-hsiung 蔡勳雄; Cài Xūnxióng (1941–)	Concurrently held post of Minister Without Portfolio.		
21		Chang Jin-fu 張進福; Zhāng Jìnfú (1948–)	September 10, 2009	February 26, 2010	Independent
21		Chang Jin-fu 張進福; Zhāng Jìnfú (1948–)	Concurrently held post of Minister Without Portfolio.		
22		Lin Junq-tzer 林政則; Lín Zhèngzé (1944–)	February 26, 2010	May 20, 2016	Kuomintang
22		Lin Junq-tzer 林政則; Lín Zhèngzé (1944–)	Concurrently held post of Minister Without Portfolio.		
23		Shih Jun-ji 施俊吉; Shī Jùnjí (1955–)	May 20, 2016	June 30, 2016	Independent
23		Shih Jun-ji 施俊吉; Shī Jùnjí (1955–)	Concurrently held post of Minister Without Portfolio. Shortest serving chairperson.		
24		Hsu Jan-yau 許璋瑤; Xǔ Zhangyáo (1951–)	July 1, 2016	November 5, 2017	Independent
24		Hsu Jan-yau 許璋瑤; Xǔ Zhangyáo (1951–)	Concurrently held post of Minister Without Portfolio.		
25		Wu Tze-cheng 吳澤成; Wú Zéchéng (1945–)	November 6, 2017	June 30, 2018	Independent
25		Wu Tze-cheng 吳澤成; Wú Zéchéng (1945–)	Concurrently held post of Minister Without Portfolio.		

== See also ==
- Taiwan Provincial Consultative Council
- Fujian Provincial Government
