= Chengcing Lake =

Lake in Niaosong, Kaohsiung, Taiwan

- 澄清湖 (Chinese)
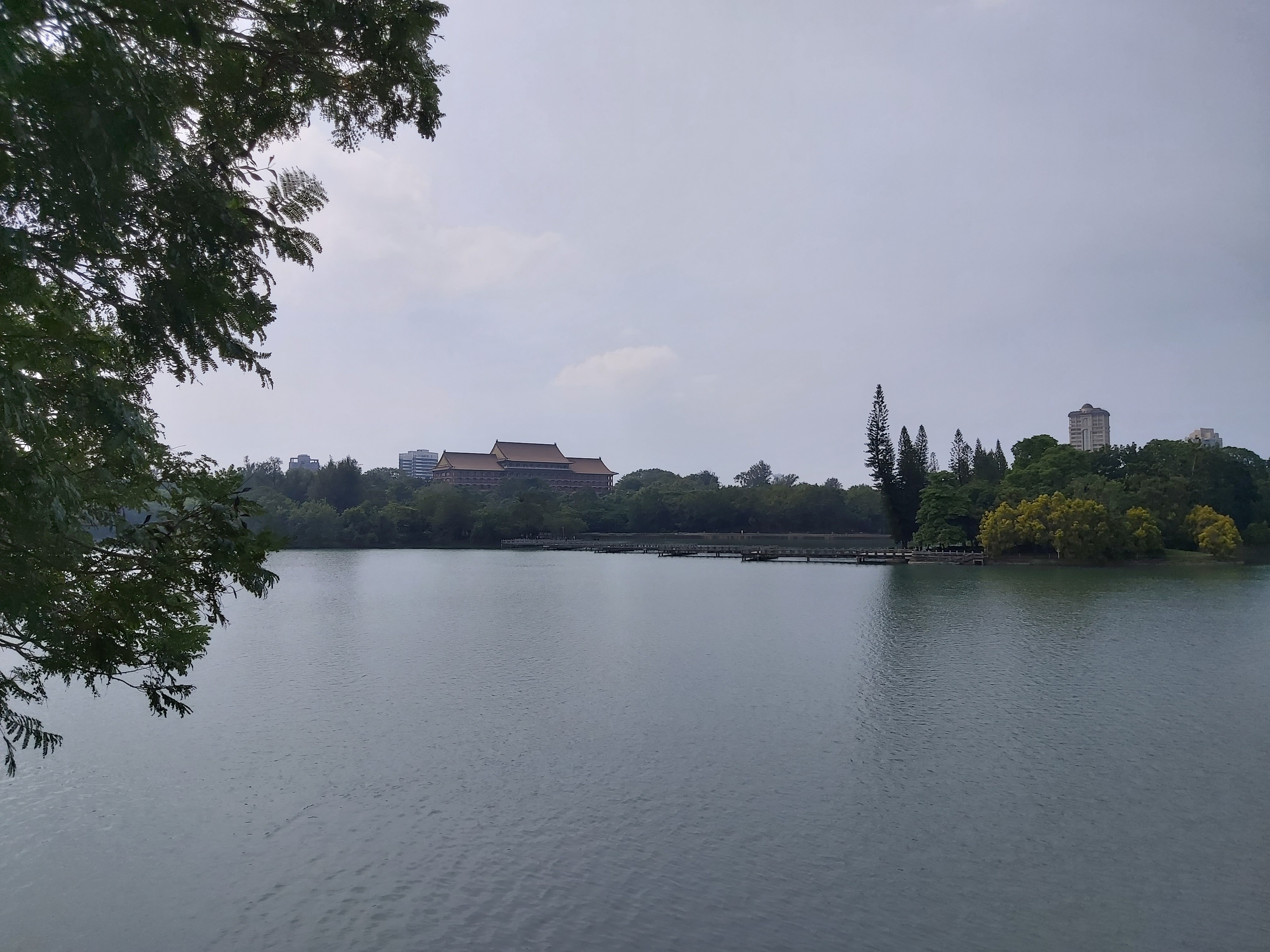

- Location within Kaohsiung
- Location: Niaosong, Kaohsiung, Taiwan
- Coordinates: 22°39′39.0″N 120°21′08.1″E
- Type: lake
- Surface area: 1.03 km^{2} (0.40 sq mi)
- Islands: Fuguo

Chengcing Lake (Chinese: 澄清湖; Hanyu Pinyin: Chéngqīng Hú; Tongyong Pinyin: Chéngcing Hú; Wade–Giles: Ch'eng^{2}-ch'ing^{1} Hu^{2}), also known as the Cheng Ching Lake, Dabei Lake (大貝湖), or Toapi Lake (Chinese: 大埤湖; Pe̍h-ōe-jī: Tōa-pi-ô͘) in Taiwanese, is an artificial lake located in Niaosong, Kaohsiung, Taiwan. The lake is not far from downtown Kaohsiung and the major suburban district of Fengshan. The lake is a source of the water supply network and a tourist area of the Kaohsiung region.

== Park and aquarium ==
A portion of the lake with its shore is administrated as a gated park. A chateau of Chiang Kai-shek, the former president and military leader of Taiwan, is located in the park. Around the lake shore, Chiang also established an underground military headquarters, which has been adapted into a public aquarium, the Cheng Ching Lake Exotic Marine Life Museum. It was originally built as a tunnel in 1961, as protection against a nuclear attack.

The Bridge of Nine Turns across the lake was built in 1960. It is 230 meters in length by 2.5 meters wide, including nine right-angled turns. The restored Zhongxing Pagoda the lake area's tallest structure, standing 43 meters high, with good views from the top, which can be reached via winding stairs.

After Mainland China fell under the control of the Chinese Communist Party in 1949, General Huang Chieh led 30,000 Republic of China Army soldiers to Vietnam and they were stationed at Phu Quoc Island. Later, the army moved to Taiwan in June, 1953. There is currently a small island in Chengcing Lake that was constructed in November 1955 and named Fuguo Island (富國島) in memory of the fleeing Chinese soldiers in 1949.

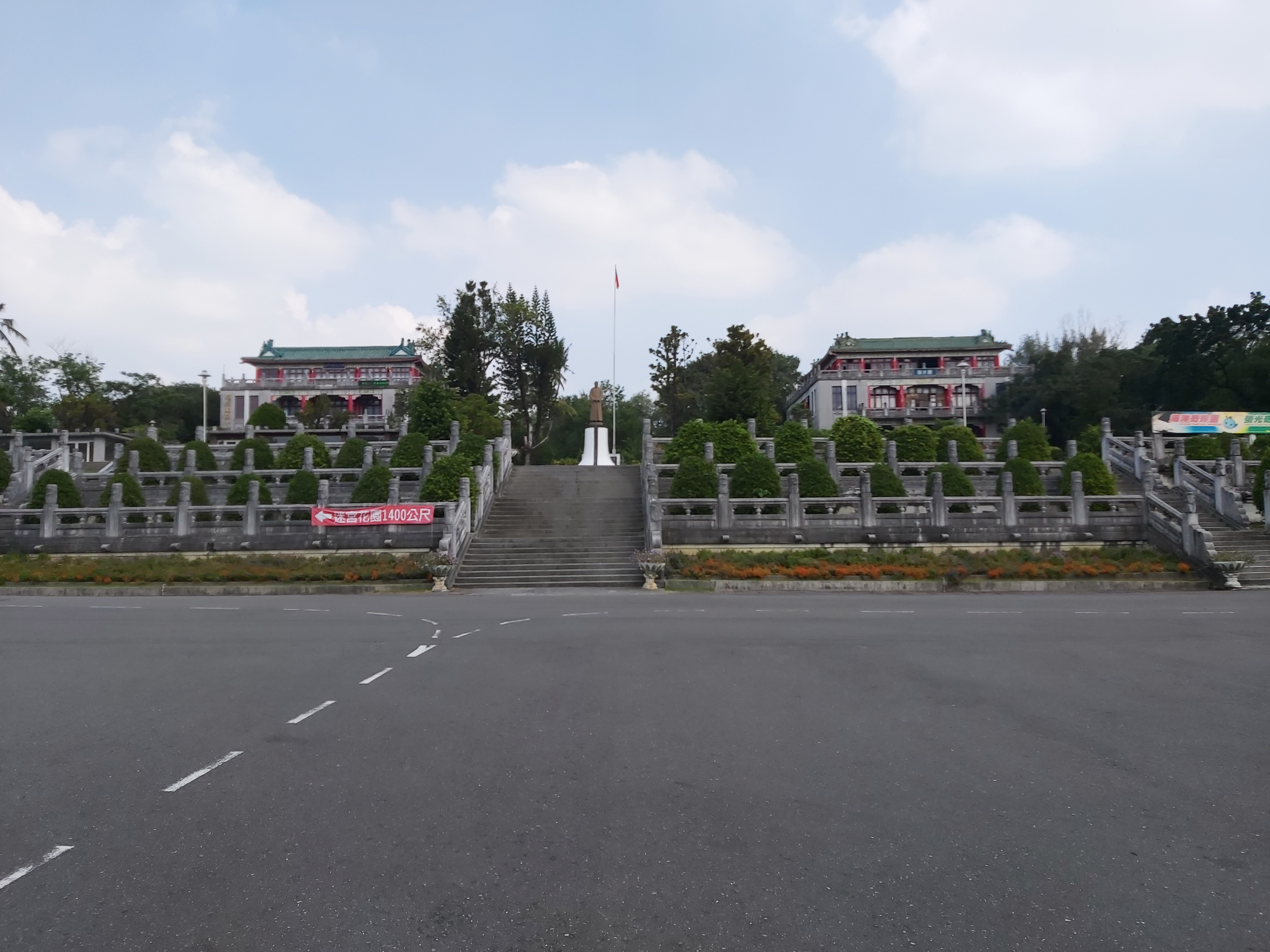
Entrance of the Park

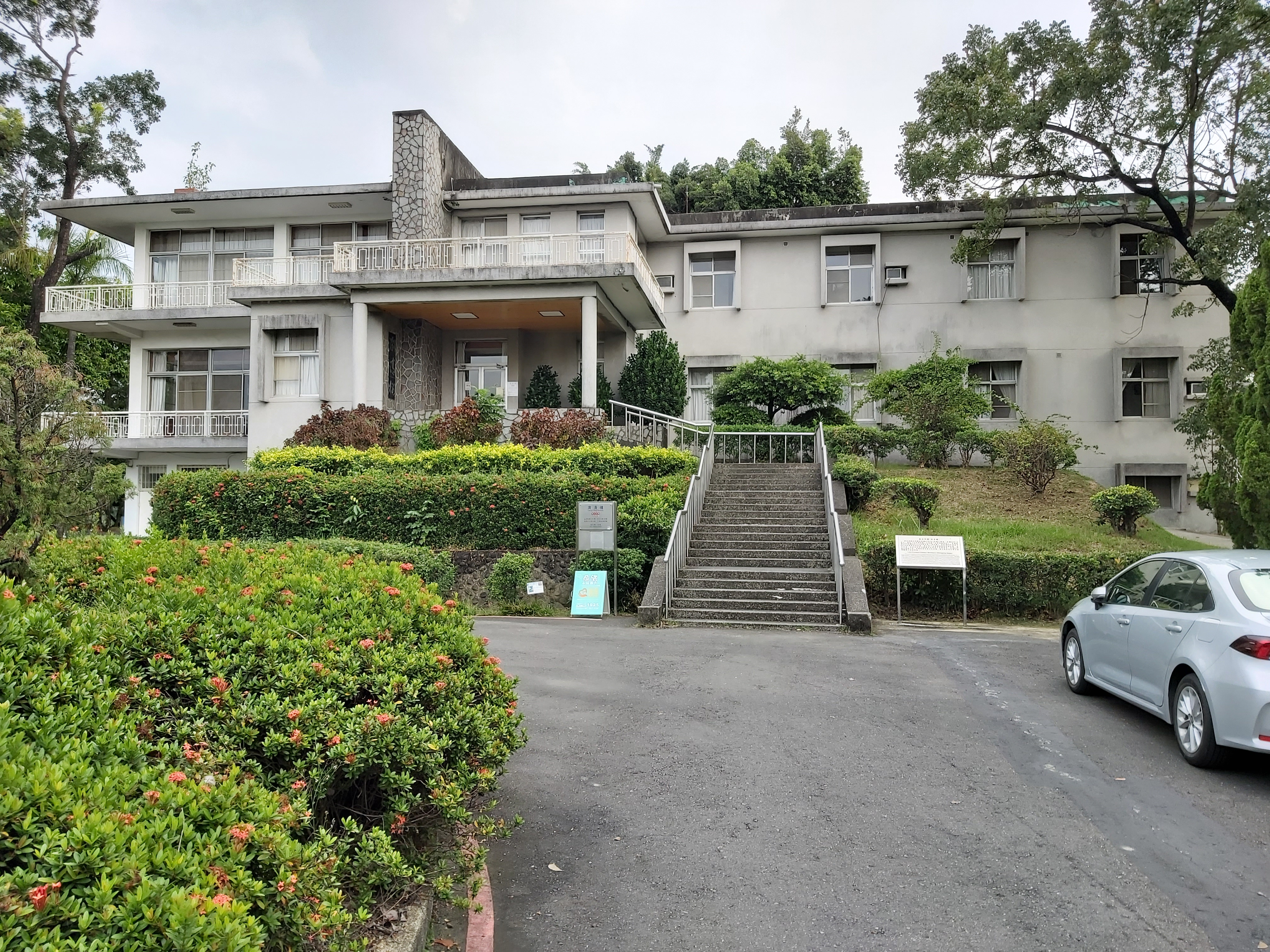
Chengcing Lake Guesthouse

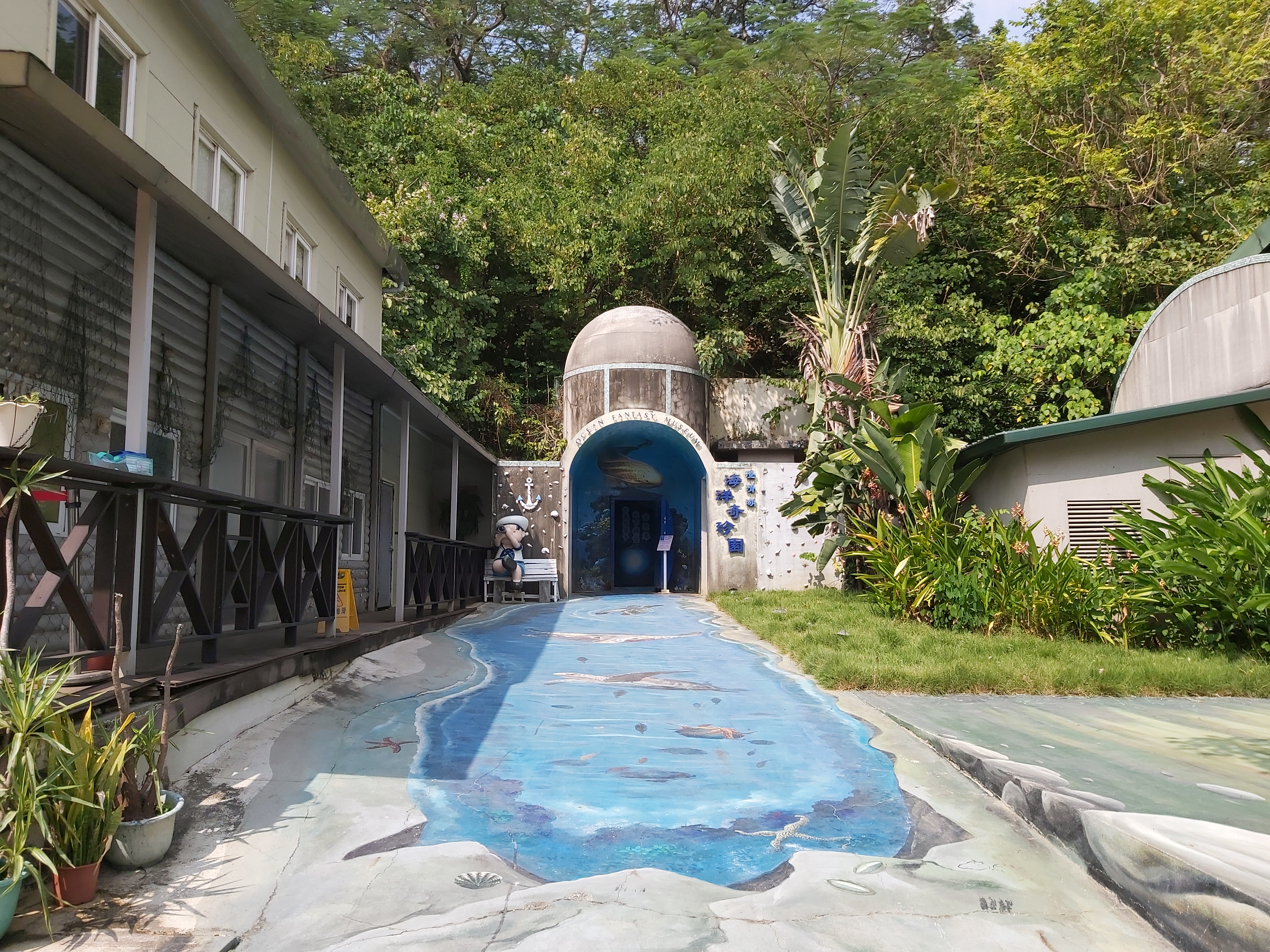
Cheng Ching Lake Exotic Marine Life Museum

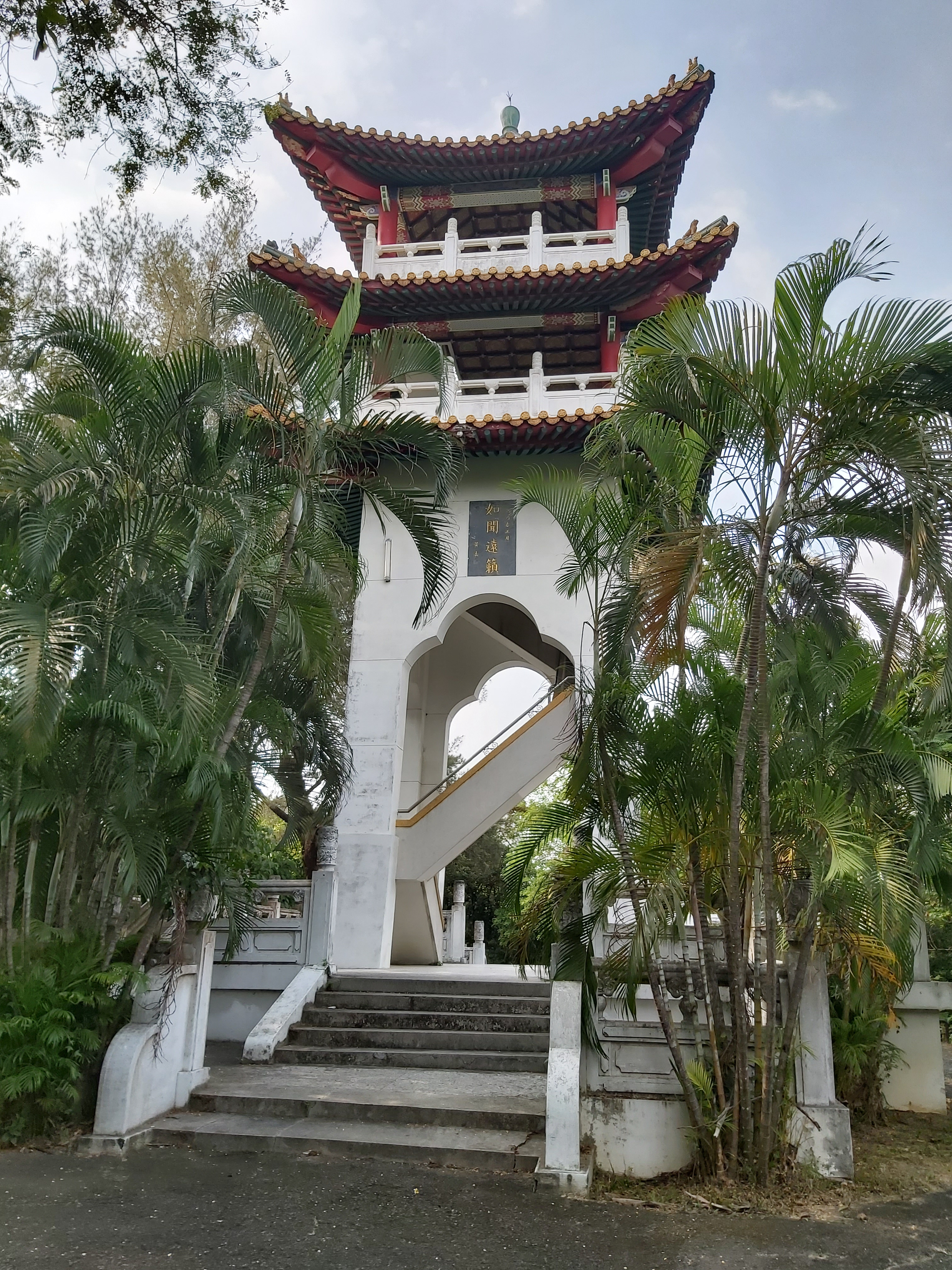
Bell Tower

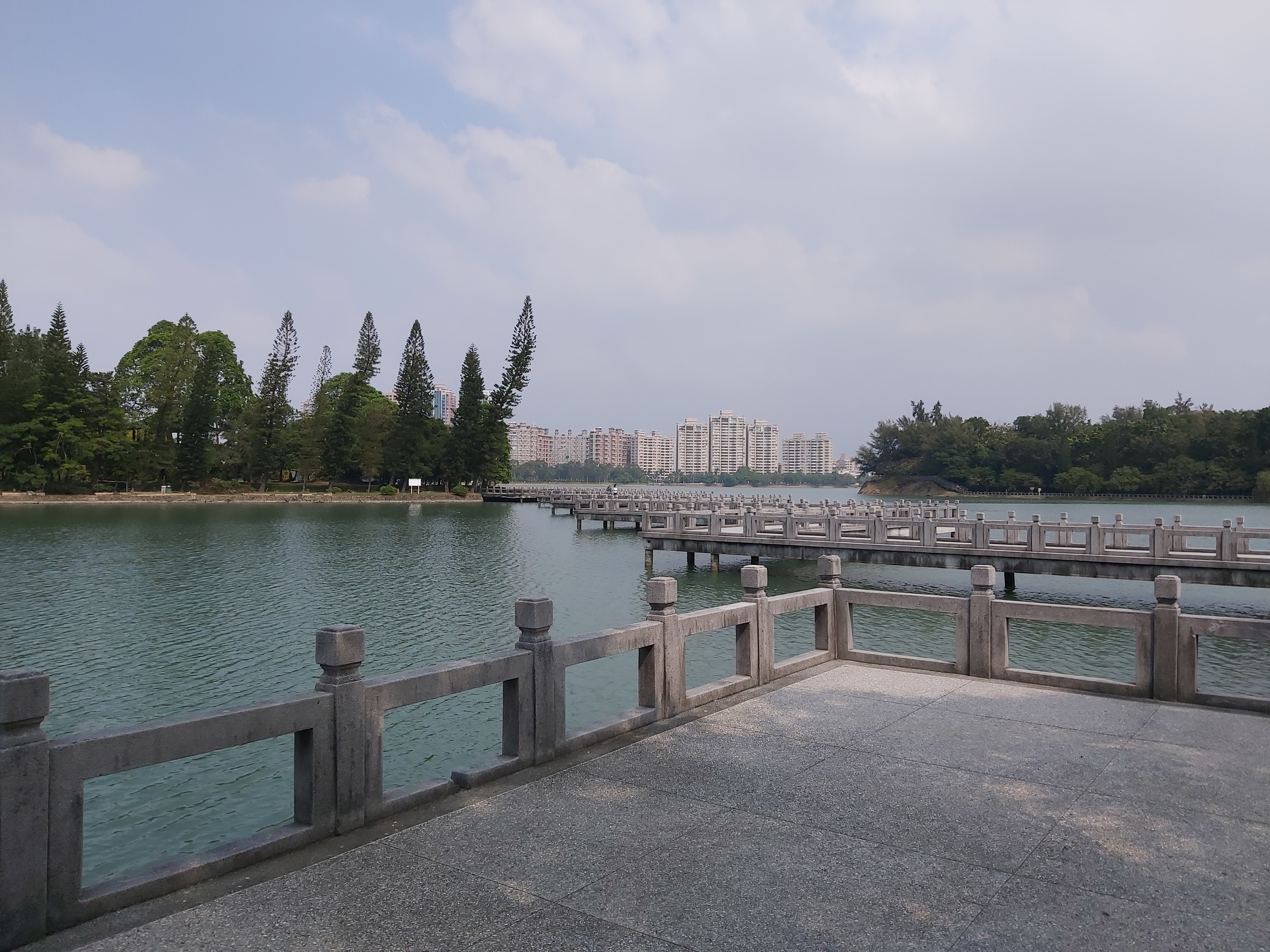
The Nine-curved Bridge

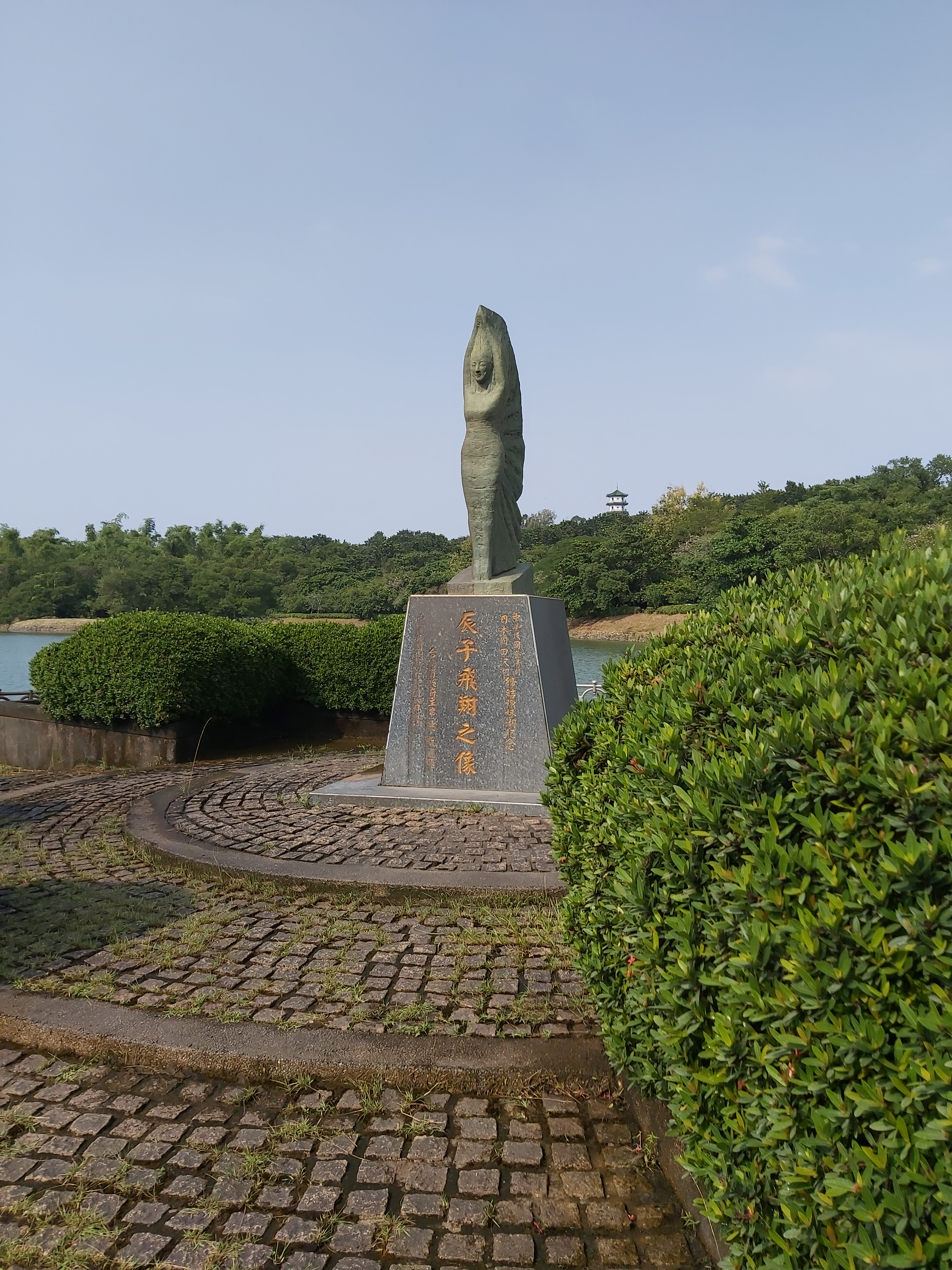
Bronze Statue of Flying Tazuko

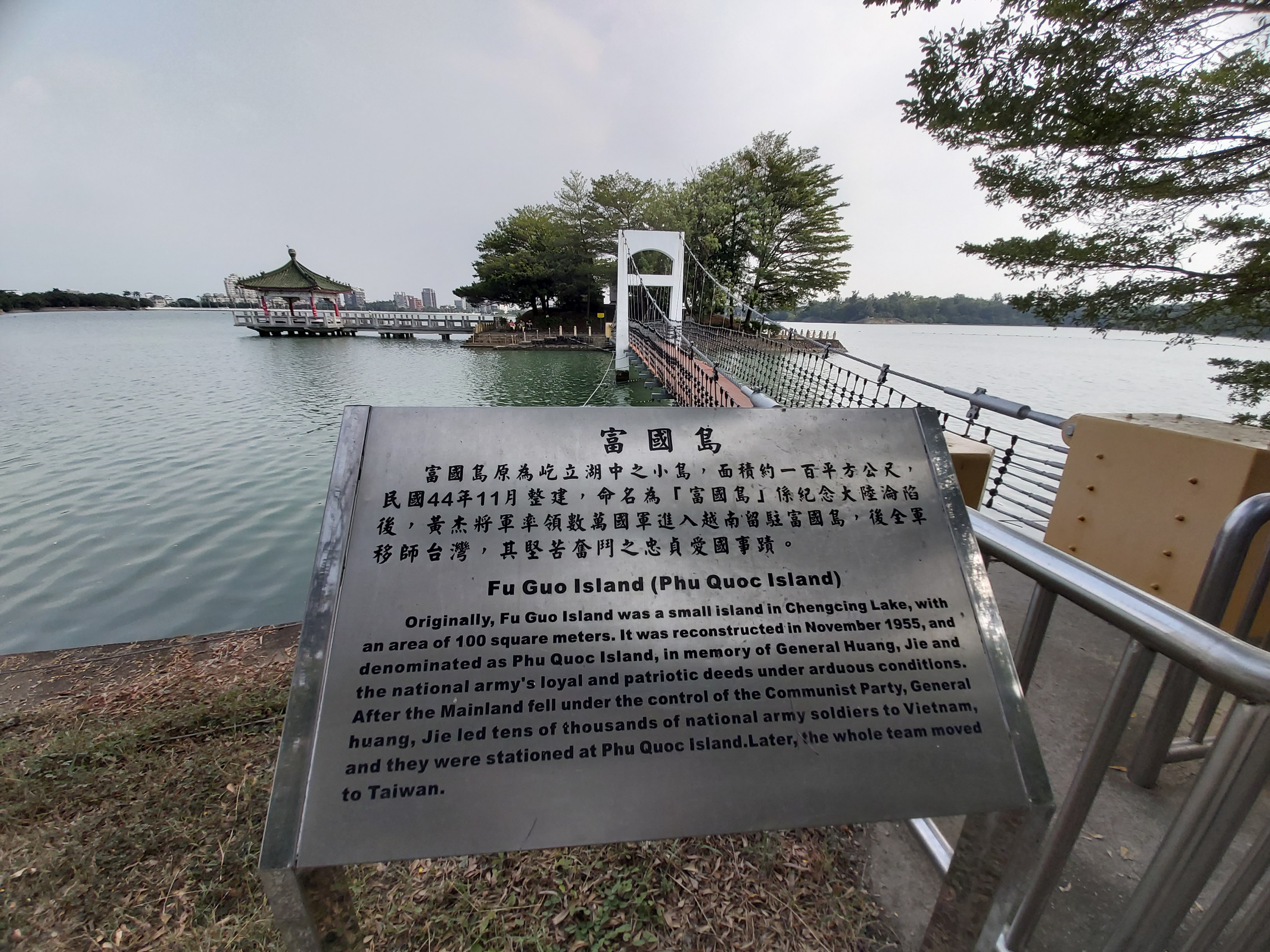
Fu Guo Island

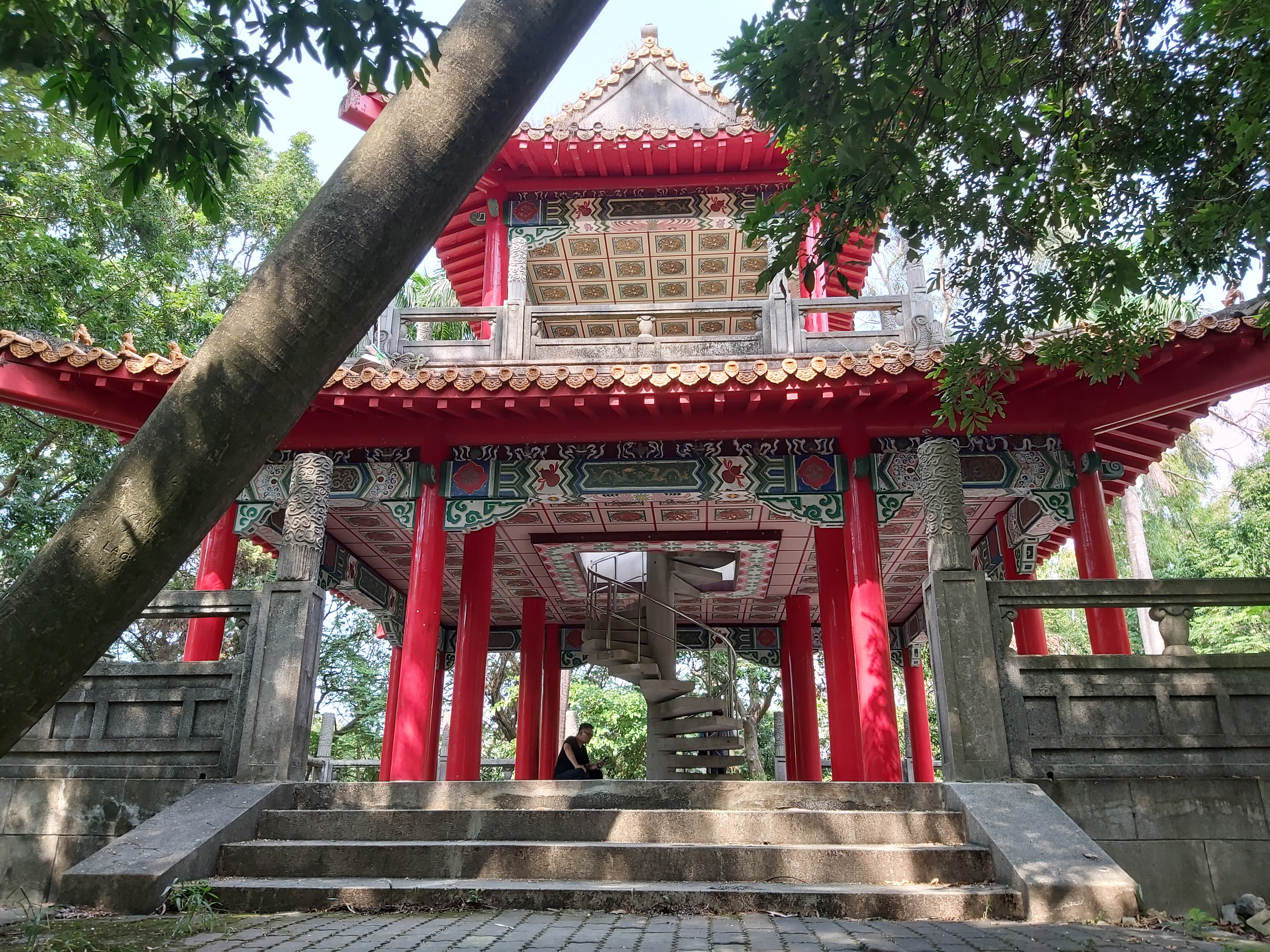
Feng Yuan Pavilion

== See also ==
- Kaohsiung Grand Hotel
- Chengcing Lake Baseball Stadium
- Guesthouses of Chiang Kai-shek
