= 嘉義 =

嘉義 mostly refers to Chiayi, a city in Taiwan, and its surrounding places.

嘉義 may also refer to:

== Terms related to Chiayi ==
- Chiayi, a city in Taiwan.
- Chiayi County, a county in Taiwan around Chiayi city.
- Chiayi metropolitan area, an urban area surrounding Chiayi City.

== Other uses ==
- Gia Nghĩa, a provincial city in Vietnam.
