= Caesar Park Hotel Banqiao =

Hotel in Banqiao, New Taipei, Taiwan

Caesar Park Hotel Banqiao 板橋凱撒大飯店
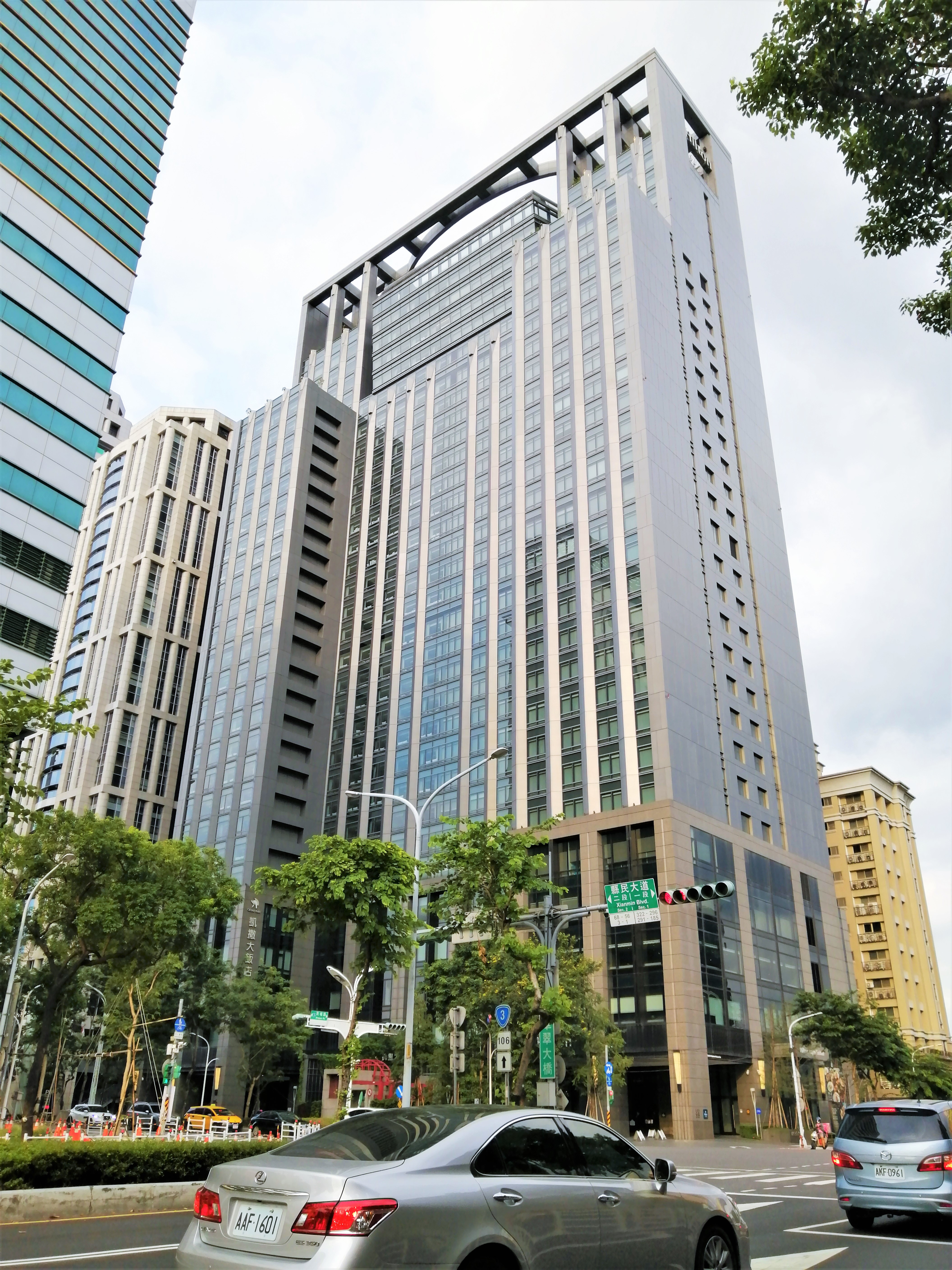
- Interactive map of Caesar Park Hotel Banqiao 板橋凱撒大飯店

General information
- Type: Hotel
- Location: No. 8, Section 2, Xianmin Boulevard, Banqiao District, New Taipei, Taiwan
- Coordinates: 25.01195919910197°N 121.46297878963243°E
- Completed: 2017

Height
- Architectural: 141.4 m (464 ft)

Technical details
- Floor count: 31

The Caesar Park Hotel Banqiao (Chinese: 板橋凱撒大飯店) is a skyscraper hotel completed in 2017 in Banqiao District, New Taipei, Taiwan. The architectural height of the building is 141.4 m (464 ft) and it comprises 31 floors above ground and five basement levels.

== The Hotel ==
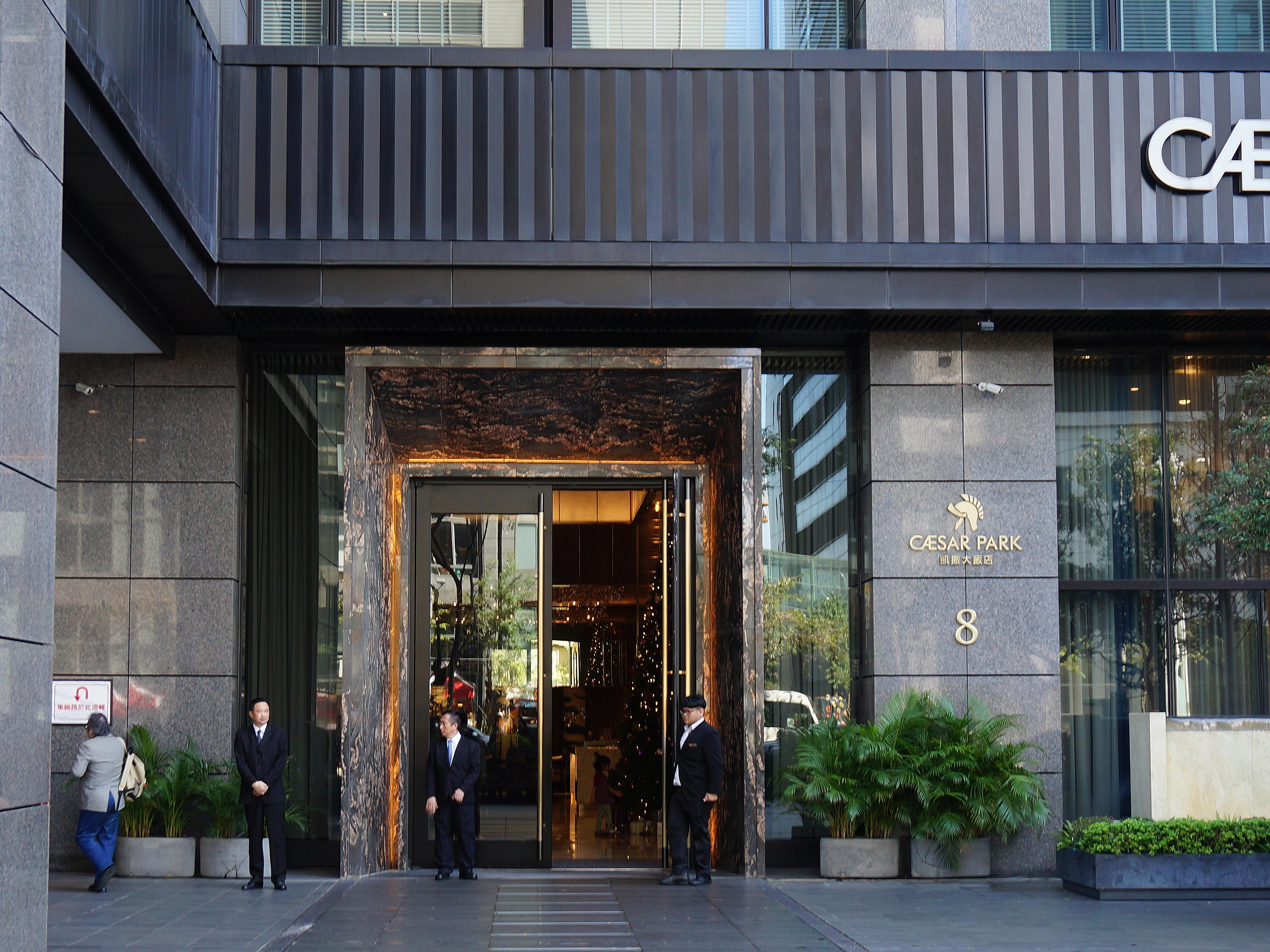
Main Entrance of Caesar Park Hotel Banqiao.

The exterior of the hotel is designed to resemble a large sky lantern in the Taiwan Lantern Festival to symbolize the image of hope and prosperity. The hotel has a total of 400 rooms including premium suites, themed restaurants, one café and a bar. It also offers a pillar-less, 7-meter high banquet hall as well as a rooftop outdoor infinity pool with a view overlooking Greater Taipei, a gym and prestige lounge. The hotel was the first Five star hotel in New Taipei City.

=== Restaurants & Bars ===
- Bon appetit Buffet Restaurant: Buffet offering cuisines from around the globe, including Japanese cuisine and Italian cuisine.
- JIA YAN Chinese Restaurant: Chinese restaurant featuring traditional authentic Taiwanese cuisine.
- Carrara Restaurant: Restaurant offering Mediterranean cuisines from France, Spain, Italy and Greece.
- Lobby Bar: Coffee shop offering light meals, beverages in the daytime and transforms into a bar at night.
- SKY 32: Rooftop bar featuring a view of the city's skyline.

== See also ==
- Caesar Metro Taipei
- Mandarin Oriental, Taipei
- Caesar Park Taipei
- Grand Mayfull Hotel Taipei
