= Special municipality (Taiwan) =

Administrative division of Taiwan

Special Municipality
- Special municipalities are shown in pink
- Category: Special municipalities, counties, and cities
- Location: Free area of the Republic of China
- Number: 6
- Populations: 1,881,204–4,014,560
- Areas: 272–2,952
- Government: City government; City council
- Subdivisions: District

A special municipality (Note: In local languages: Traditional Chinese script: 直轄市; Mandarin Pinyin: Zhíxiá shì; Hokkien: Ti̍t-hat chhī; Sixian Hakka: Chhṳ̍t-hot sṳ), historically known as a Yuan-controlled municipality, is a first-level administrative division unit in Taiwan. It is the highest level of the country's administrative structure and is equivalent to a province. After the suspension of the provincial governments of 2018, the special municipalities along with provincial cities and counties have all governed directly under the central government.

Currently total six cities are designated as special municipalities: Taipei, Taoyuan, New Taipei, Taichung, Tainan, and Kaohsiung, all located in the most densely populated regions in the western half of the island. These special municipalities encompass five most populous metropolitan areas in Taiwan, accounting for more than two-thirds of the national population.

== History ==
The first municipalities of the ROC were established in 1927 soon after they were designated as "cities" during the 1920s. Nominally, Dairen was a municipality as well, although it was under Japanese control. It consisted of the original 11 cities of Nanjing, Shanghai, Beiping (Beijing), Tianjin, Qingdao, Chongqing, Xi'an, Canton, Hankou District (now part of Wuhan), Shenyang, and Harbin. These cities were first called special municipalities/cities (特別市; tèbiéshì), but were later renamed Yuan-controlled municipalities (院辖市; 院轄市; yuànxiáshì).

Before the end of World War II, the island of Taiwan (Formosa) was under Japanese rule, with 11 cities established within its administrative divisions. Following the Japanese surrender in 1945, the Republic of China (ROC) took control of Taiwan, most of pre-1945 cities in Taiwan were reorganized as provincial cities, but Yilan and Hualien became the first two county-administered cities.

After the loss of the mainland to the Chinese Communist Party in 1949, all the special municipalities established in mainland China were lost. The new communist-led People's Republic of China government replaced the Yuan-controlled municipalities with direct-controlled municipalities. The Kuomintang-led government of the Republic of China lost the Chinese Civil War and relocated to Taipei, Taiwan. By the time of its retreat, no special municipalities was established in Taiwan or other territories under effective control of the ROC government.

In 1967, Taipei City, the first special municipality in Taiwan was created. Taipei served as the capital of the country starting in 1949 and was at the time the most populous city. The scope of the Taipei special municipality includes the original provincial City of Taipei and 4 of its neighboring townships in Taipei County, including Neihu, Nangang, Muzha and Jingmei. In the next year, Shilin and Beitou of Yangmingshan Administrative Bureau (a county-equivalent administrative division) were also merged into Taipei.

In 1979, the major international port and industrial city in the southwest of the country — Kaohsiung — were also upgraded to a special municipality. Territory of the Kaohsiung special municipality includes the original provincial Kaohsiung City and Siaogang Township in Kaohsiung County.

At this time, Taiwan was under martial law. All national and municipal level elections were suspended. The mayors of Taipei and Kaohsiung were assigned by the Executive Yuan (central government), not by elections until 1994. For this reason the special municipalities were also called Yuan-controlled municipalities (Chinese: 院轄市; pinyin: yuànxiáshì) at this period.

Following the democratic reforms in the early 1990s, more thoughts of administrative division reform and reorganization were widely discussed. The Local Government Act (地方制度法) was passed by the Legislative Yuan (the Parliament) in 1999. This Act regulates the local self-governance bodies and came with some articles to deal with the possible changes of administrative divisions. In the Act also states that cities with population of over 1,250,000 and with significance on political, economic and cultural development may form a special municipality.

The 2007 amendment of Local Government Act states that a county or city with population over two million may grant some extra privileges in local autonomy that was designed for special municipalities. This type of counties are often called quasi-municipalities (準直轄市). Taipei County was the first division within this case. In 2009, another amendment of Local Government Act gave councils of counties and cities the right to file petitions to reform themselves into special municipalities. Four proposals were approved by the Executive Yuan in 2009

- Kaohsiung: merged from Kaohsiung Special Municipality and Kaohsiung County
- New Taipei: reformed from Taipei County
- Taichung: merged from Taichung Provincial City and Taichung County
- Tainan: merged from Tainan Provincial City and Tainan County

The four newly created special municipalities were formally established on December 25, 2010 with the inauguration of the new mayors.

In June 2010, the population of Taoyuan County also grew over 2 million and were qualified for being a quasi-municipality since 2011. The county government also sent a proposal to become a special municipality in 2012. Executive Yuan approved the proposal and the special municipality of Taoyuan were formally established on December 25, 2014.

Currently, there are in total six special municipalities under the central government. The special municipalities cover the top five most populous metropolitan areas in Taiwan and over two thirds (2/3) of the national population.

Municipality	Metropolitan area	Region
Taipei	Taipei–Keelung metropolitan area	Northern Taiwan
Taoyuan	Taoyuan–Zhongli metropolitan area	Northern Taiwan
Taichung	Taichung–Changhua metropolitan area	Central Taiwan
Kaohsiung	Kaohsiung metropolitan area	Southern Taiwan
New Taipei	Taipei–Keelung metropolitan area	Northern Taiwan
Tainan	Tainan metropolitan area	Southern Taiwan

== Current Special Municipalities ==
There are currently six special municipalities:

Name	Population	Area (km^{2})	Administrative centre	Date of establishment
Taipei (Note: In local languages: Traditional Chinese script: 臺北市; Mandarin Pinyin: Táiběi Shì; Hokkien: Tâi-pak tshī; Sixian Hakka: Thòi-pet sṳ)	2,688,140	271.7997	Xinyi District (Note: In local languages: Traditional Chinese script: 信義區)	1967-07-01
Taoyuan (Note: In local languages: Traditional Chinese script: 桃園市; Mandarin Pinyin: Táoyuán Shì; Hokkien: Thô-hn̂g tshī; Sixian Hakka: Thò-yèn sṳ)	2,092,977	1,220.9540	Taoyuan District (Note: In local languages: Traditional Chinese script: 桃園區)	2014-12-25
Kaohsiung (Note: In local languages: Traditional Chinese script: 高雄市; Mandarin Pinyin: Gāoxióng Shì; Hokkien: Ko-hiông tshī; Sixian Hakka: Kô-hiùng sṳ)	2,779,790	2,946.2527	Lingya District (Note: In local languages: Traditional Chinese script: 苓雅區), Fengshan District (Note: In local languages: Traditional Chinese script: 鳳山區)	1979-07-01
New Taipei (Note: In local languages: Traditional Chinese script: 新北市; Mandarin Pinyin: Xīnběi Shì; Hokkien: Sin-pak tshī; Sixian Hakka: Sîn-pet sṳ)	3,955,777	2,052.5667	Banqiao District (Note: In local languages: Traditional Chinese script: 板橋區)	2010-12-25
Taichung (Note: In local languages: Traditional Chinese script: 臺中市; Mandarin Pinyin: Táizhōng Shì; Hokkien: Tâi-tiong tshī; Sixian Hakka: Thòi-chûng sṳ)	2,702,920	2,214.8968	Xitun District (Note: In local languages: Traditional Chinese script: 西屯區), Fengyuan District (Note: In local languages: Traditional Chinese script: 豐原區)	2010-12-25
Tainan (Note: In local languages: Traditional Chinese script: 臺南市; Mandarin Pinyin: Táinán Shì; Hokkien: Tâi-lâm tshī; Sixian Hakka: Thòi-nàm sṳ)	1,883,251	2,191.6531	Anping District (Note: In local languages: Traditional Chinese script: 安平區), Xinying District (Note: In local languages: Traditional Chinese script: 新營區)	2010-12-25

Their self-governed bodies (executive and legislature) regulated by the Local Government Act are:

Name	Executive			Legislature	
Name	Government	Mayor	Current Mayor	City Council	No. of seats
Kaohsiung	Kaohsiung City Government	Mayor of Kaohsiung	Chen Chi-mai	Kaohsiung City Council	66
New Taipei	New Taipei City Government	Mayor of New Taipei	Hou You-yi	New Taipei City Council	66
Taichung	Taichung City Government	Mayor of Taichung	Lu Shiow-yen	Taichung City Council	63
Tainan	Tainan City Government	Mayor of Tainan	Huang Wei-cher	Tainan City Council	57
Taipei	Taipei City Government	Mayor of Taipei	Chiang Wan-an	Taipei City Council	63
Taoyuan	Taoyuan City Government	Mayor of Taoyuan	Chang San-cheng	Taoyuan City Council	60

In Taiwanese municipalities, the mayor is the highest-ranking official in charge. The mayor is directly elected by the people registered in the municipality for a duration of four years.

== Future ==
In Hsinchu City and Hsinchu County, it was proposed in September 2021 that both are to be upgraded to the nation's newest special municipality. Similarly, Changhua County and Changhua City have been expressed interest to become its special municipality that October. The Tsai Ing-wen administration had approved the proposal to merge Hsinchu county and city in December 2021 but rejected Changhua due to the county's decline of population below the 1.25 million required by Article 4 of the Local Government Act for a region to be eligible for an upgrade.

== See also ==
- Political divisions of Taiwan (1895–1945)
- Cities designated by government ordinance of Japan
- Independent city
  - Direct-administered municipality (Mainland China)
  - Special cities of North Korea
  - List of provincial-level cities of South Korea
  - Municipalities of Vietnam
- Federal city
  - Federal cities of Russia — similar systems
- Arrondissement, an equivalent type of urban district in some (mainly French-speaking) countries and territories

Overview of administrative divisions of the Republic of China
Republic of China
Free area (Note: Also known as the Taiwan area or Tai–Min area (Chinese: 臺閩地區; lit. 'Taiwan–Fujian area'))					Mainland area (Note: The mainland area consists of Mainland China, Tibet and (previously) Outer Mongolia)
Special municipalities (Note: Has an elected executive and an elected legislative council.) (Note: Special municipalities, cities, and county-administered cities are all called shi (Chinese: 市; lit. 'city'))		Provinces (Note: Nominal; provincial governments have been abolished)			Not administered (Note: Constitutionally having the same structure as the free area, these are currently under the Chinese Communist Party control with a different structure)
Special municipalities		Counties		Autonomous municipalities (Note: Sometimes called cities (Chinese: 市) or provincial cities (Chinese: 省轄市) to distinguish them from special municipalities and county-administered cities)	Not administered
Districts (Note: Has an appointed district administrator for managing local affairs and carrying out tasks commissioned by superior agency.)	Mountain indigenous districts	County- administered cities	Townships (Note: There are two types of townships: rural townships or xīang (Chinese: 鄉) and urban townships or zhèn (Chinese: 鎮))	Districts	Not administered
Villages (Note: Has an elected village administrator for managing local affairs and carrying out tasks commissioned by superior agency.) (Note: Villages in rural townships are known as cūn (Chinese: 村), those in other jurisdictions are known as lǐ (Chinese: 里))					Not administered
Neighborhoods					Not administered
