= Special municipality =

Special municipality may refer to:

- Special municipality (Netherlands), a type of administrative division in the Netherlands
- Special municipality (Taiwan), a type of administrative division in Taiwan

== See also ==
- Isla de la Juventud, an administrative division of Cuba designated as a "Special Municipality"
