= Yongan District =

District in Kaohsiung, Taiwan

Coordinates: 22.822707°N 120.226967°E

Yongan 永安區 Yong'an District
- District
- Yongan District in Kaohsiung City
- Country: Taiwan
- Region: Southern Taiwan

Population (October 2023)
  - Total: 13,860
- Website: yongan.kcg.gov.tw/en/

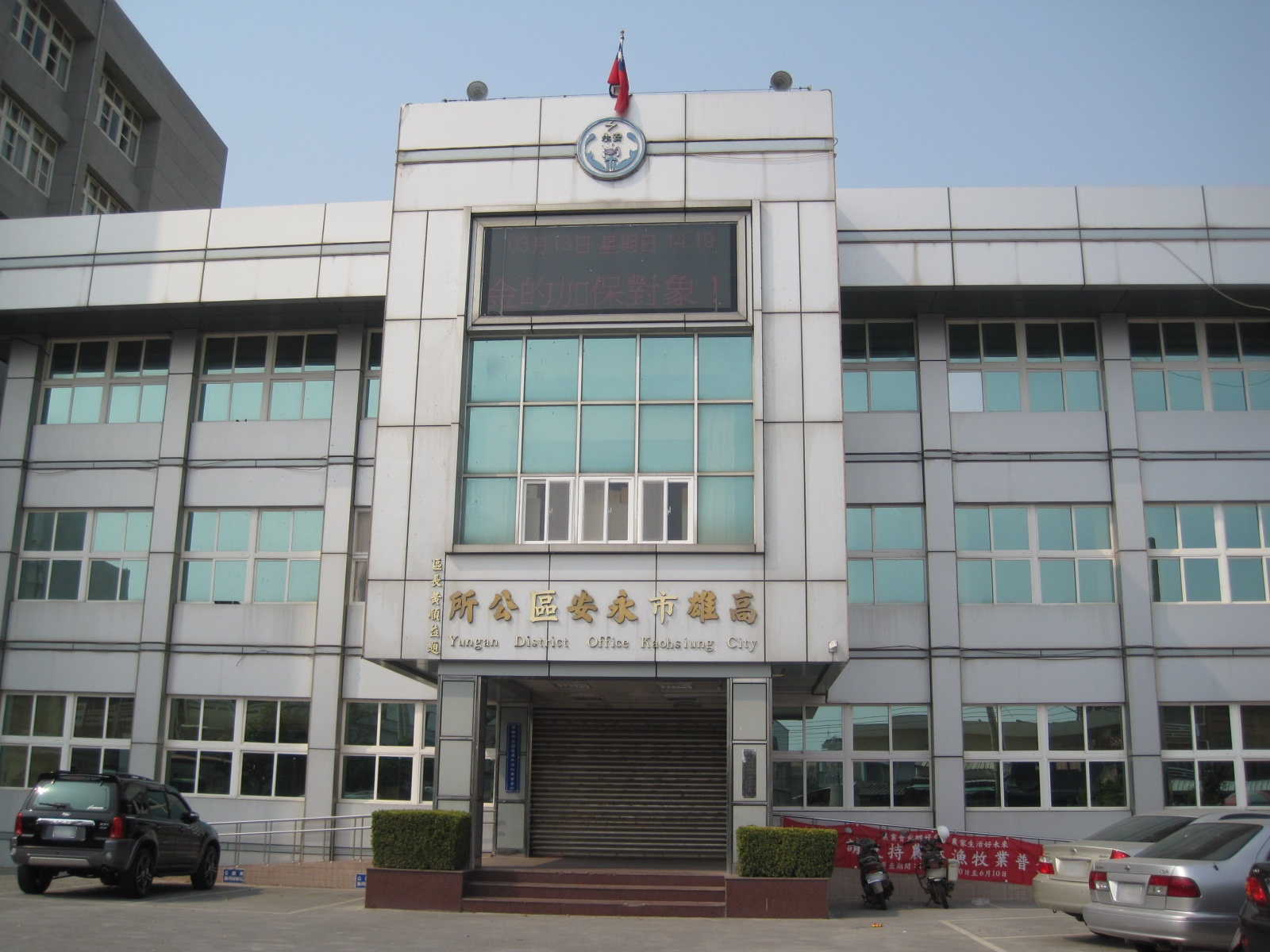
Yongan District office

Yongan District (Chinese: 永安區; pinyin: Yǒng'ān Qū) is a coastal suburban district of Kaohsiung City in southern Taiwan.

== History ==
After the handover of Taiwan from Japan to the Republic of China in 1945, Yong'an was organized as a rural township of Kaohsiung County. On 25 December 2010, Kaohsiung County was merged with Kaohsiung City and Yong'an was upgraded to a district of the city.

== Administrative divisions ==
The district consists of Yongan, Yonghua, Xingang, Yantian, Baoning and Weixin Village.

== Politics ==
The district is part of Kaohsiung City Constituency II electoral district for Legislative Yuan.

== Tourist attractions ==
- Old House of Huang Family (Chinese: 黃家古厝)
- Yongan Yong'an Temple (永安宮)

== Infrastructure ==
- Hsinta Power Plant
- Yongan LNG Terminal
- Yongan PV Power Plant

== See also ==
- Kaohsiung
