= Hsinta Power Plant =

Power plant in Qieding and Yong'an, Kaohsiung, Taiwan

Hsinta Power Plant 興達發電廠
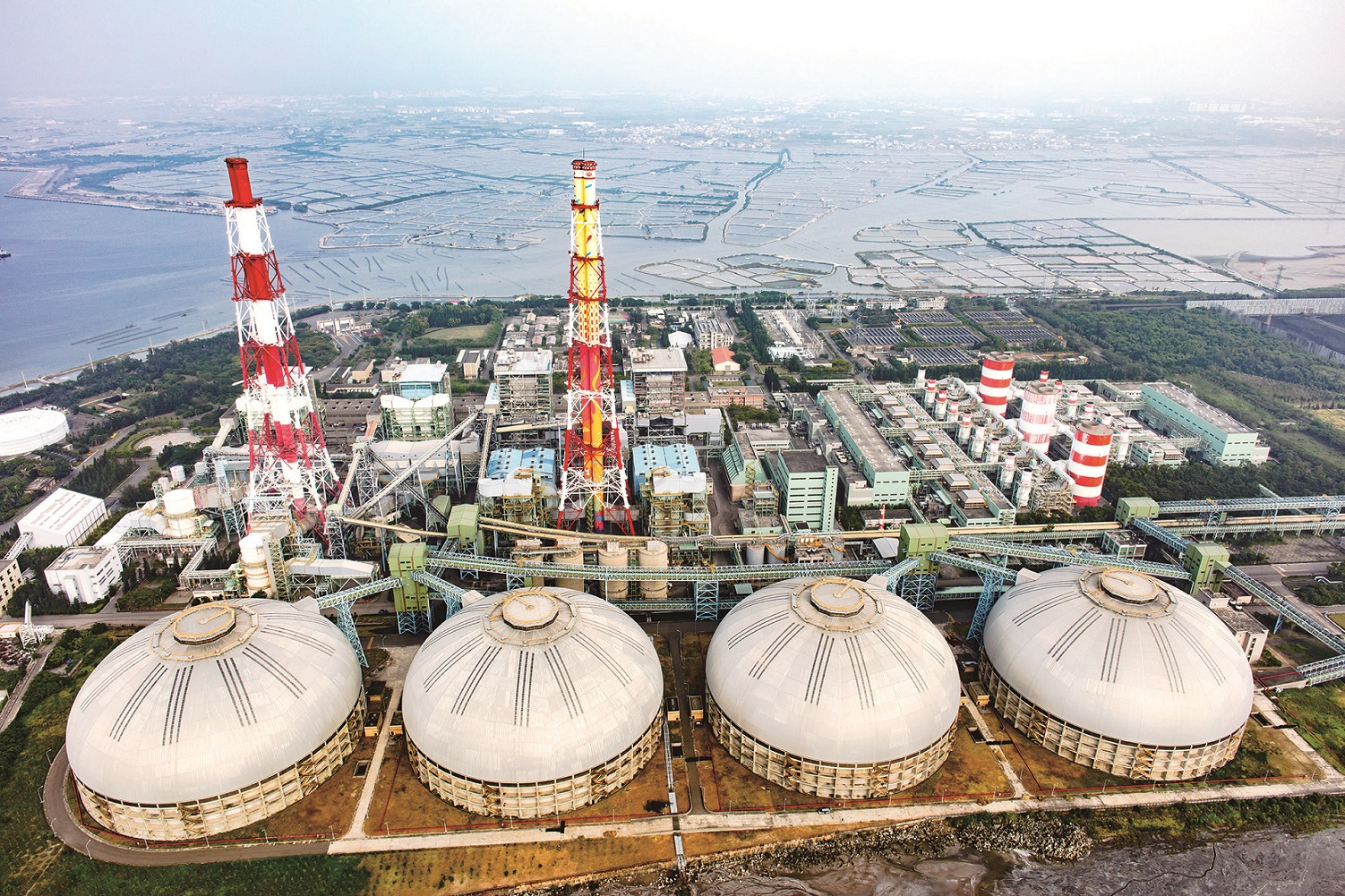
- Flue-gas stacks at Hsinta Power Plant
- Official name: 興達發電廠
- Country: Taiwan
- Location: Yong'an and Qieding, Kaohsiung, Taiwan
- Coordinates: 22°51′23″N 120°11′49″E
- Status: Operational
- Construction began: 1978
- Commission date: September 1982 (Unit 1); December 1983 (Unit 2); June 1985 (Unit 3); April 1986 (Unit 4)
- Owner: Taipower
- Operator: Taipower

Thermal power station
- Primary fuel: Coal

Power generation
- Units operational: 4 (coal)
- Nameplate capacity: 4,326 MW

External links
- Commons: Related media on Commons

Hsinta Power Plant
- Traditional Chinese: 興達發電廠
- Simplified Chinese: 兴达发电厂
Transcriptions
Standard Mandarin
- Hanyu Pinyin: Xìngdá Fādiànchǎng
- Wade–Giles: Hsing4-ta2 Fa1-tien4-ch'ang3
Southern Min
- Hokkien POJ: Heng-ta̍t Hoat-tiān-chhiúⁿ

The Hsinta Power Plant or Hsing-ta Power Plant (Chinese: 興達發電廠) is a coal-fired power plant in Yong'an District and Qieding District in Kaohsiung, Taiwan. With a total installed capacity of 4,326 MW, the plant is Taiwan's second largest coal-fired power plant after the 5,500 MW Taichung Power Plant (coal-generated power only).

It is the oldest coal-fired power plant in Taiwan as of 2019 and was built 37 years ago without any prior air quality impact evaluation., making it notorious for polluting air quality in southern Taiwan for decades.

== Components ==
The coal yards of the power plant was designed as an indoor type to mitigate local environment impacts. It consists of four coal domes with 170,000 tonnes of storage capacity each, which enables the continuous supply for all of the generation units for 50 days of operation.

The coal handling system of the power plant consists of stacker, reclaimer and two conveyor belts. The capacity of the stacker is 4,000 tonnes/hour and reclaimer is 2,000 tonnes/hour. The first conveyor belt has a total length of 4.8 km with a capacity of 4,000 tonnes/hour, handling between the coal domes and barge, and the second conveyor belt has a total length of 5.2 km with a capacity of 2,000 tonnes/hour, handling between the coal dome and wharf.

== Events ==
=== 4 March 2010 ===
Generators in four units of the plant tripped at 8:18 a.m following the 2010 Kaohsiung earthquakes.

=== 13 May 2021 ===
Three of four generators are tripped due to unknown reason, causing a government-announced planned series rotating power outages around Taipei, New Taipei City, Yilan County, and Taoyuan.

=== 2 March 2022 ===
Equipment failures at the plant led connection outages in the island's southern power grid, causing widespread power outages in southern Taiwan and parts of northern and central Taiwan.

== Transportation ==
Hsinta Power Plant is accessible West from Luzhu Station of Taiwan Railway.

== See also ==
- List of power stations in Taiwan
- List of coal power stations
- Electricity sector in Taiwan
