= Zihguan District =

District in Kaohsiung, Taiwan

Coordinates: 22.749114°N 120.254604°E

Zihguan 梓官區 Tzuguan Ziguan
- District
- Zihguan District
- Ziguan District in Kaohsiung City
- Country: Taiwan
- Region: Southern Taiwan

Population (October 2023)
  - Total: 34,843
- Website: zihguan-en.kcg.gov.tw

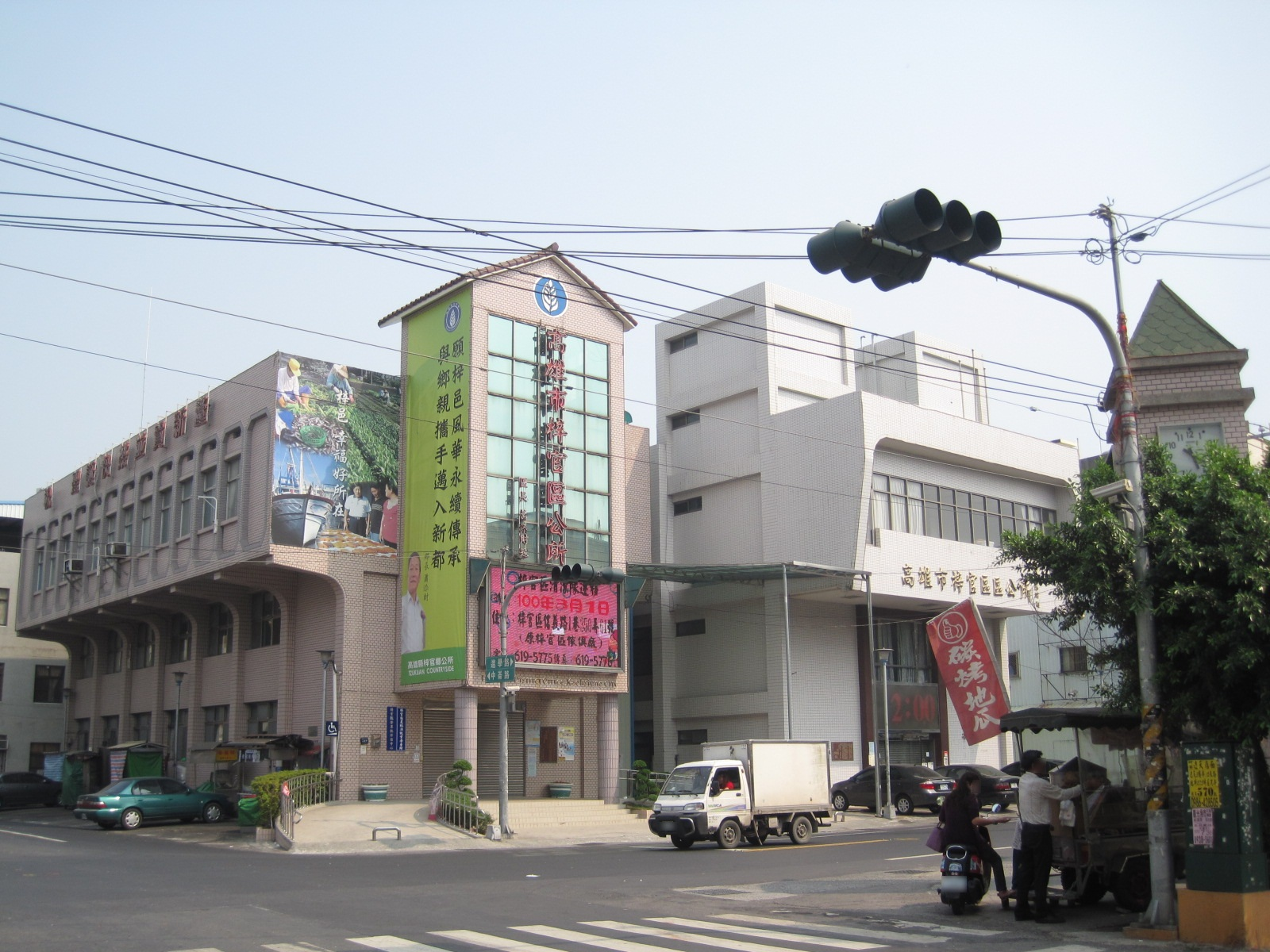
Ziguan District office

Zihguan District (Chinese: 梓官區; Hanyu Pinyin: Zǐguān Qū; Tongyong Pinyin: Zǐhguan Cyu; Wade–Giles: Tzŭ^{3}-kuan^{1} Ch'ü^{1}) is a coastal suburban district of Kaohsiung City in southern Taiwan.

== History ==
After the handover of Taiwan from Japan to the Republic of China in 1945, Zihguan was organized as a rural township of Kaohsiung County. On 25 December 2010, Kaohsiung County was merged with Kaohsiung City and Zihguan was upgraded to a district of the city.

== Geography ==
- Area: 11.595 km^{2}
- Population: 34,843 people (October 2023)

== Administrative divisions ==
Ziguan District is divided into 15 villages and 286 neighborhoods.

- Chidong Village
- Chikan Village
- Chixi Village
- Dashe Village
- Dianbao Village
- Jiadong Village
- Like Village
- Tong'an Village
- Xinke Village
- Zhike Village
- Zhonglun Village
- Zihe Village
- Ziping Village
- Zixin Village
- Ziyi Village

== Politics ==
The district is part of Kaohsiung City Constituency II electoral district for Legislative Yuan.

== Economy ==
Northern Zihguan consists mostly on agriculture, while in the South consists mostly about fishery.

== Tourist attractions ==
- Tong'an Temple (蚵子寮通安宫)

== Notable natives ==
- Sun Shu-may, pop singer, actress and TV host

== See also ==
- Kaohsiung
