= Yongan PV Power Plant =

Photovoltaic power plant in Yong'an, Kaohsiung, Taiwan

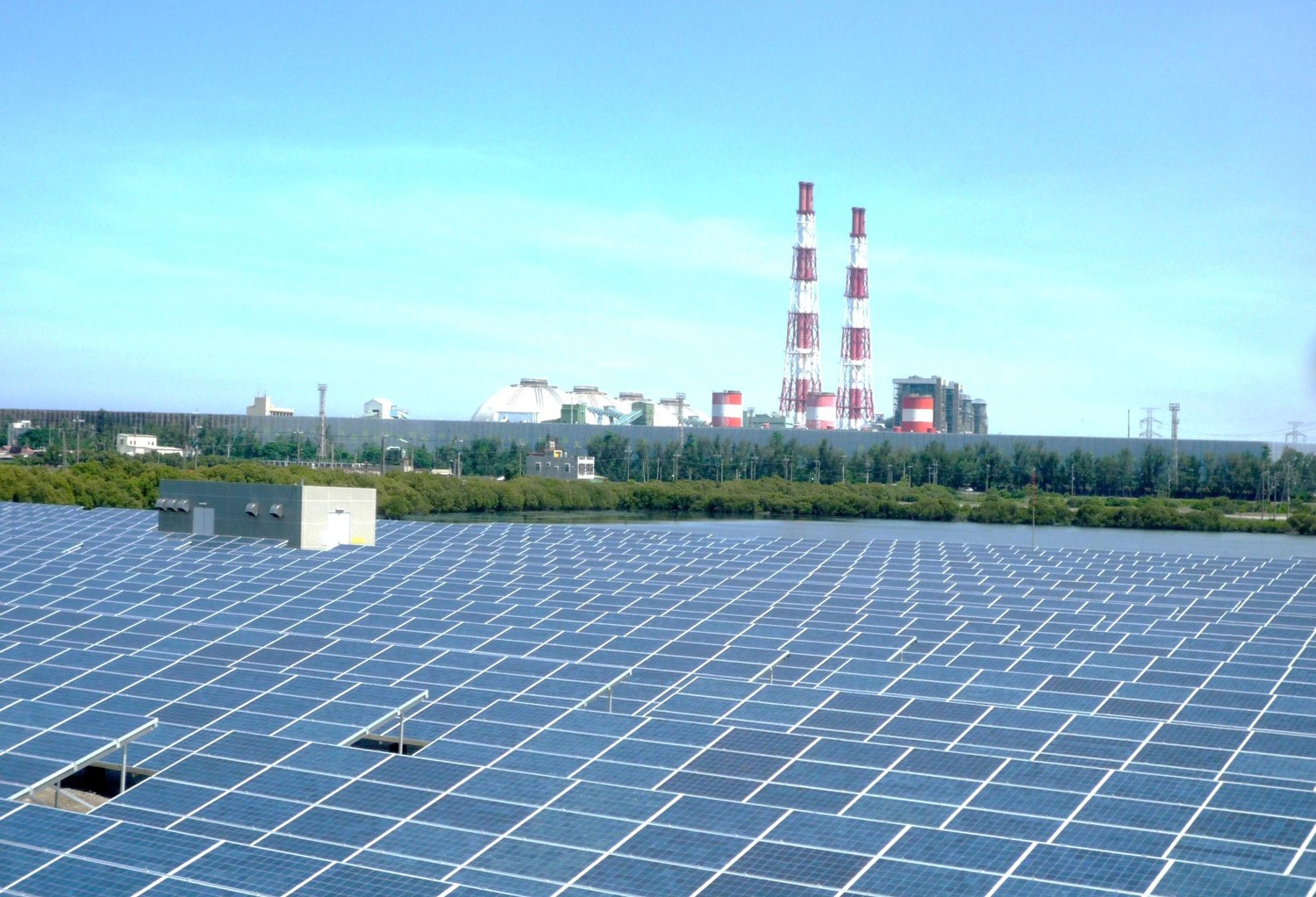
- Official name: 永安太陽光電場
- Country: Taiwan
- Location: Yongan, Kaohsiung
- Coordinates: 22°50′18.1″N 120°12′24.8″E
- Commission date: 2011

Solar farm
- Type: Standard PV

Power generation
- Nameplate capacity: 5 MW
- Annual net output: 6 GWh

The Yongan PV Power Plant (traditional Chinese: 永安太陽光電場; simplified Chinese: 永安太阳光电场; pinyin: Yǒng'ān Tàiyáng Guāngdiànchǎng) is a photovoltaic power plant in Yongan District, Kaohsiung, Taiwan.

== History ==
The power plant was commissioned in 2011.

== Architecture ==
The power plant covers an area of 9.45 hectares.

== Technical specifications ==
The power plant has an installed capacity of 5 MW and can generate 6 GWh of electricity annually. It is equipped with 1 MW/1 MWh energy storage system.

== See also ==
- List of power stations in Taiwan
