= Kaohsiung metropolitan area =

Area in Kaohsiung, Taiwan

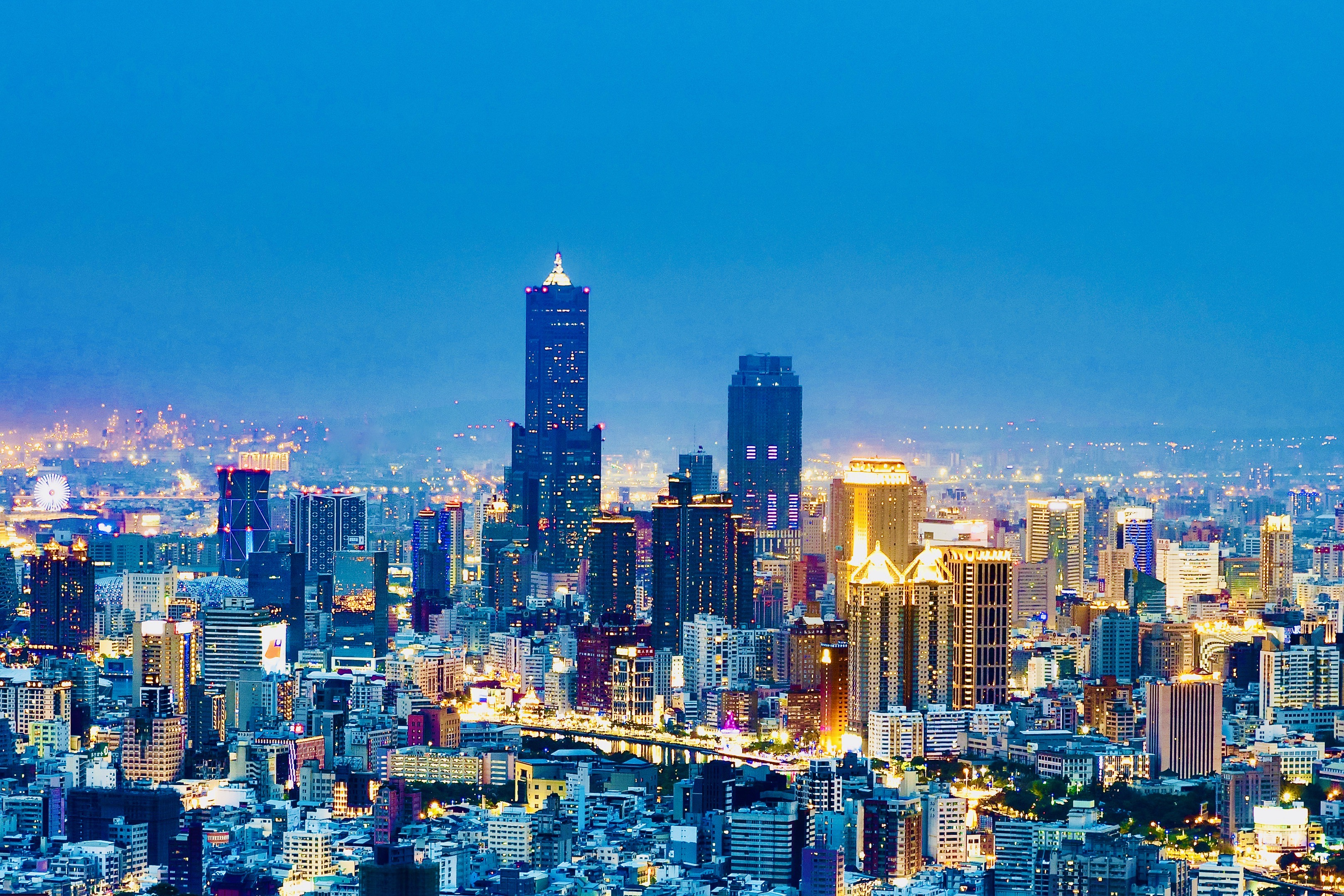
- Kaohsiung skyline

- Coordinates: 22°38′N 120°20′E
- Country: Taiwan
- Major Cities: Kaohsiung

Area
  - Metro: 1,329.8498 km^{2} (513.4579 sq mi)

Population (End of June 2018)
  - Metro: 3,023,225
  - Metro density: 2,272.05/km^{2} (5,884.6/sq mi)

Kaohsiung metropolitan area (Chinese: 高雄都會區; pinyin: Gāoxióng Dūhuì Qū) is the urban area of Kaohsiung in southern Taiwan.

== Definition ==
According to the definition of metropolitan areas formerly used by the Republic of China (Taiwan) government, Kaohsiung metropolitan area included the following areas:

Kaohsiung City (core city)			Pingtung County
Cianjhen District; Cianjin District; Ciaotou District; Cijin District; Cishan District; Daliao District; Dashu District; Dashe District; Fongshan District	Gangshan District; Gushan District; Lingya District; Linyuan District; Meinong District; Mituo District; Nanzih District; Niaosong District	Renwu District; Sanmin District; Shanlin District; Siaogang District; Sinsing District; Yanchao District; Yancheng District; Ziguan District; Zuoying District	Pingtung City; Linluo Township

However, since the merger of Kaohsiung City and the former Kaohsiung County on 25 December 2010, the term is no longer in official usage.
