= Lin Yi-shih =

Taiwanese politician

- 林益世
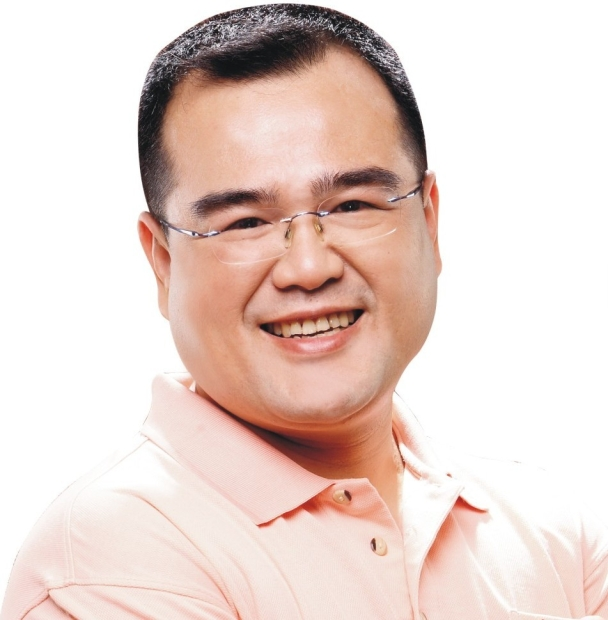
- Official portrait, 2008

Secretary-General of the Executive Yuan
- In office 6 February 2012 – 29 June 2012
- Preceded by: Lin Join-sane
- Succeeded by: Chen Shyh-kwei

Majority Leader of the Legislative Yuan
- In office 1 December 2008 – 1 February 2012
- Preceded by: Tseng Yung-chuan
- Succeeded by: Lin Hung-chih

Vice Chairman of the Kuomintang
- In office 2006–2008
- Chairperson: Ma Ying-jeou; Wu Po-hsiung; Chiang Pin-kung; Wu Po-hsiung

Member of the Legislative Yuan
- In office 1 February 1999 – 31 January 2012
- Succeeded by: Chiu Chih-wei
- Constituency: Kaohsiung 2

Personal details
- Born: 19 August 1968 (age 57) Qieding, Kaohsiung County, Taiwan
- Party: Kuomintang
- Education: Taipei Medical College (MB); National Sun Yat-sen University (MS)

Lin Yi-shih (Chinese: 林益世; pinyin: Lín Yìshì; born 19 August 1968) is a Taiwanese politician. He was the Secretary-General of the Executive Yuan in 2012.

== Early life and education ==
Lin was born on August 18, 1968, in Qieding District, Kaohsiung. He studied dentistry at Taipei Medical College, where he earned a Bachelor of Medicine (M.B.), and later graduated from National Sun Yat-sen University (NSYSU).

== Political career ==
Lin served as a legislator from 1999 to 2012, and as vice chairperson of the Kuomintang from 2006 to 2008.

In January 2012, Lin was appointed as the Secretary-General of the Executive Yuan, making him the youngest person to ever hold the position. On 27 June 2012, local media reported that Lin had accepted a bribe of NT$63 million from Chen Chi-hsiang in exchange for helping his Dih Yeon Mineral Selection Company secure a contract from China Steel Corporation in 2010. The Taipei District Court sentenced Lin to seven years and four months in prison, stripped him of civil rights for five years, and ordered him to pay a fine of NT$15.8 million. Lin appealed the ruling to the Taiwan High Court, which lengthened his prison term to 13 years and six months. A subsequent appeal to the Supreme Court found Lin guilty of "holding properties of unknown origin," for which he was issued a sentence of two years imprisonment. A second charge, of "receiving bribes in breach of official duties," regarded as a violation of the Anti-Corruption Act, was returned to the High Court for retrial. The Taiwan High Court added six months to Lin's sentence in April 2019.

== Personal life ==
Lin's father Lin Hsien-pao died in 2013.
