= Caesar Park Taipei =

Hotel in Zhongzheng, Taipei, Taiwan

- 台北凱撒大飯店
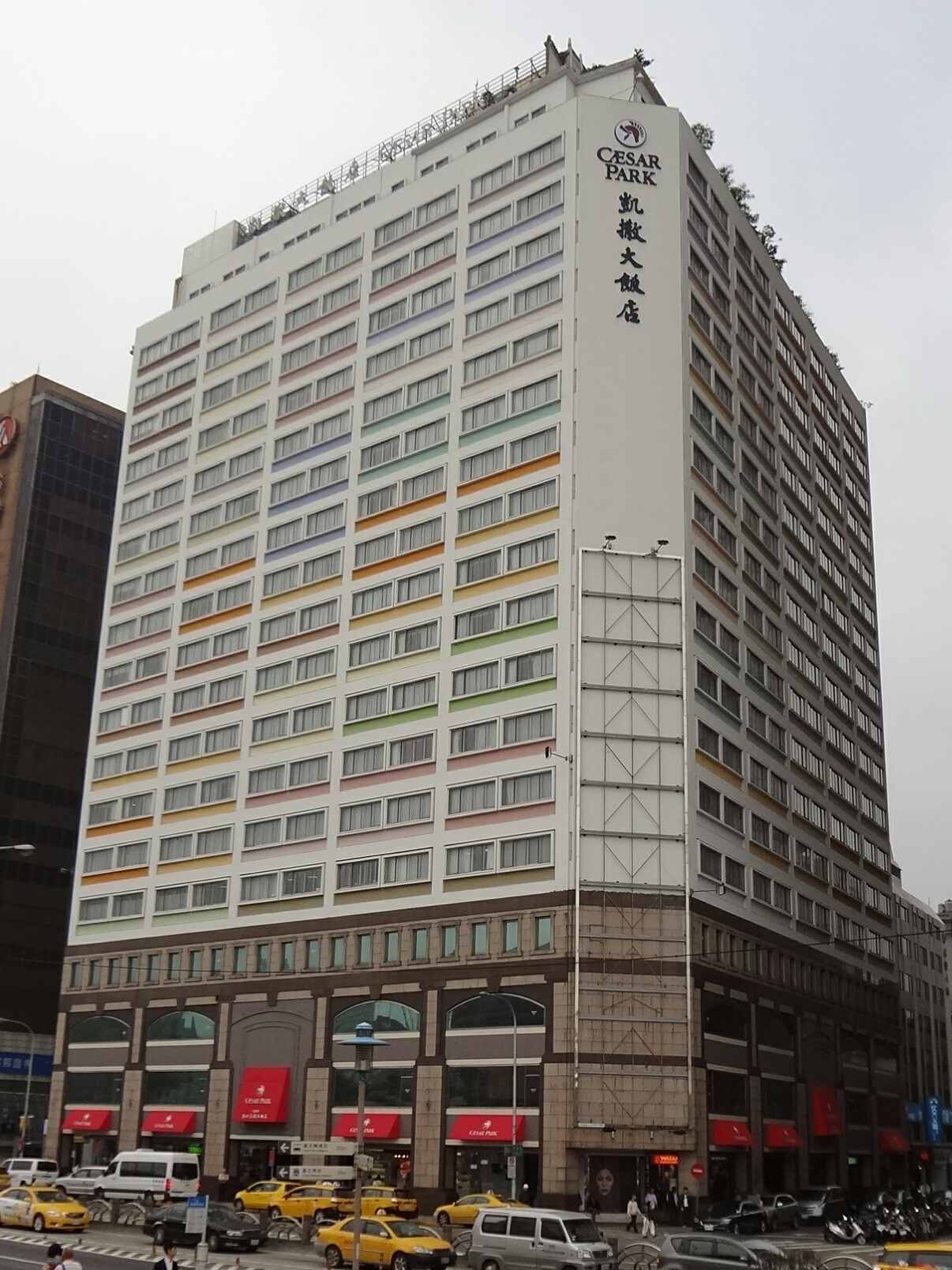

- Location within Taiwan

General information
- Status: Completed
- Type: Hotel
- Location: No. 38, Section 1, Zhongxiao West Road, Zhongzheng District, Taipei, Taiwan
- Coordinates: 25.0486°N 121.5165°E
- Completed: March 23, 1972
- Opening: July 15, 1973

Technical details
- Floor count: 20

Other information
- Number of rooms: 478

Website
- Caesar Park Taipei

The Caesar Park Taipei (Chinese: 台北凱撒大飯店) is a five-star luxury hotel in Zhongzheng District, Taipei, Taiwan. Opened on July 15, 1973 as Hilton Taipei, the hotel has 478 rooms in 6 types and suites and an exercise room, a spa and a rooftop garden. Banquet facilities and a business center are available. The 1st and B1 floors house Caesars Mall Food Court. Foreign celebrities who have visited include American movie star Elizabeth Taylor, former U.S. President Bill Clinton (while governor), American singers Tom Jones and Tina Turner and others.

== History ==
Located directly opposite the Taipei Main Station, Caesar Park Taipei was originally a sightseeing hotel invested by Huayang Development. It started construction in 1970. In 1972, it signed a management technology cooperation contract with Hilton Hotels & Resorts. When completed in September 1972, it was handed over to Hilton to operate and renamed as the Hilton Taipei. It was the tallest building in Taiwan and held the title for a year until being surpassed by Grand Hotel (Taipei) on October 10, 1973. In July 1988, Guoyu Development purchased the hotel and renewed the cooperation contract with Hilton. On December 31, 2002, the cooperation contract between Guoyu Development and Hilton ended, and on January 1, 2003, the name was changed to Caesar Park Taipei. During the 2021 COVID-19 pandemic outbreak in Taiwan, Caesar Park Taipei were among the first hotels in Taipei to announce that it would be temporarily closed in order to be transformed into a "specialized hotel for epidemic prevention". After the pandemic, It was returned to an ordinary hotel.

== Restaurants & Bars ==
- Checkers Buffet: Buffet offering cuisines from around the globe, with a view of Taipei Main Station.
- Dynasty: Chinese restaurant featuring traditional authentic Cantonese cuisine, including dim sum.

== Gallery ==
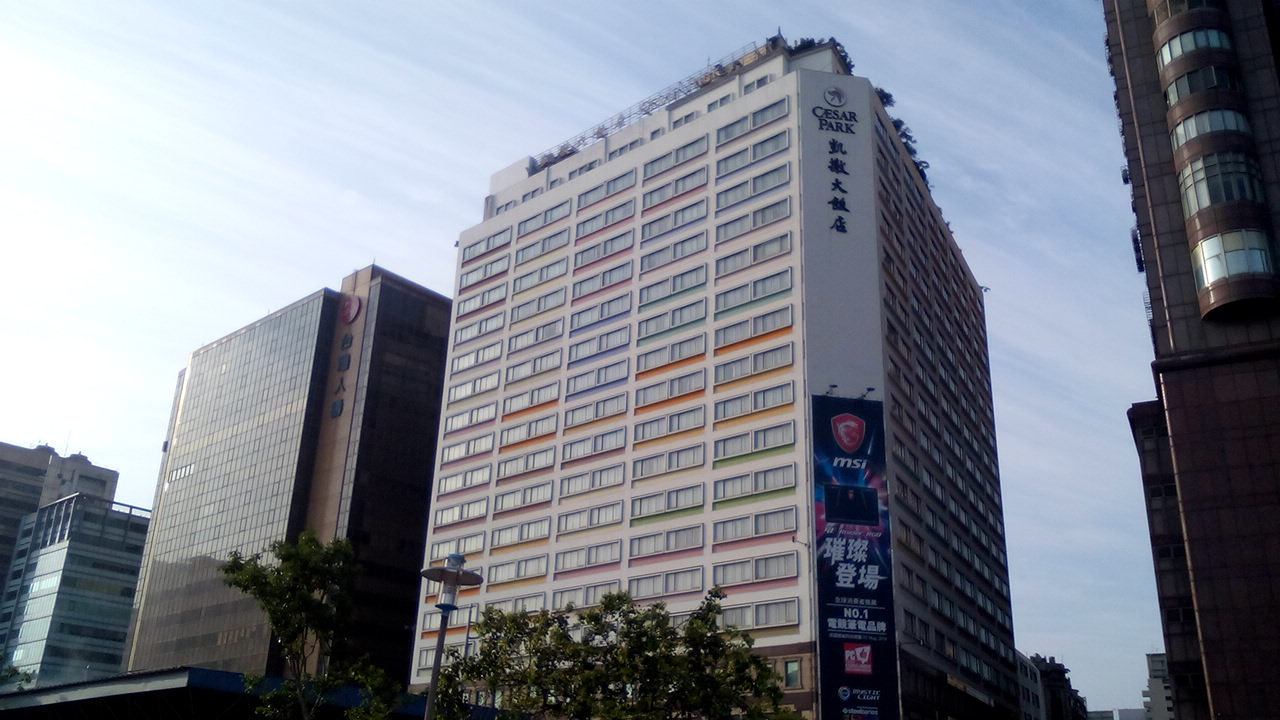
Exterior

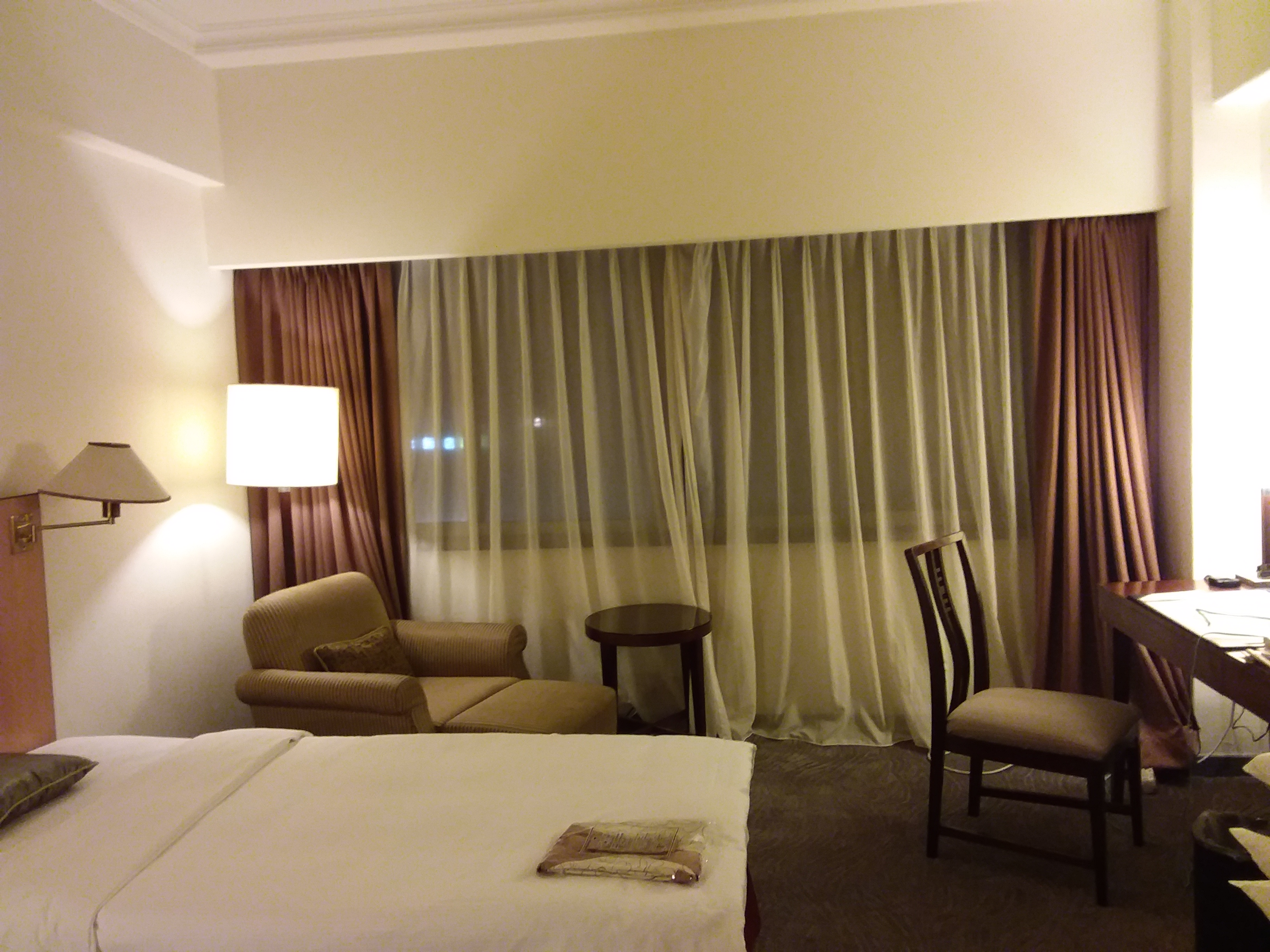
Room

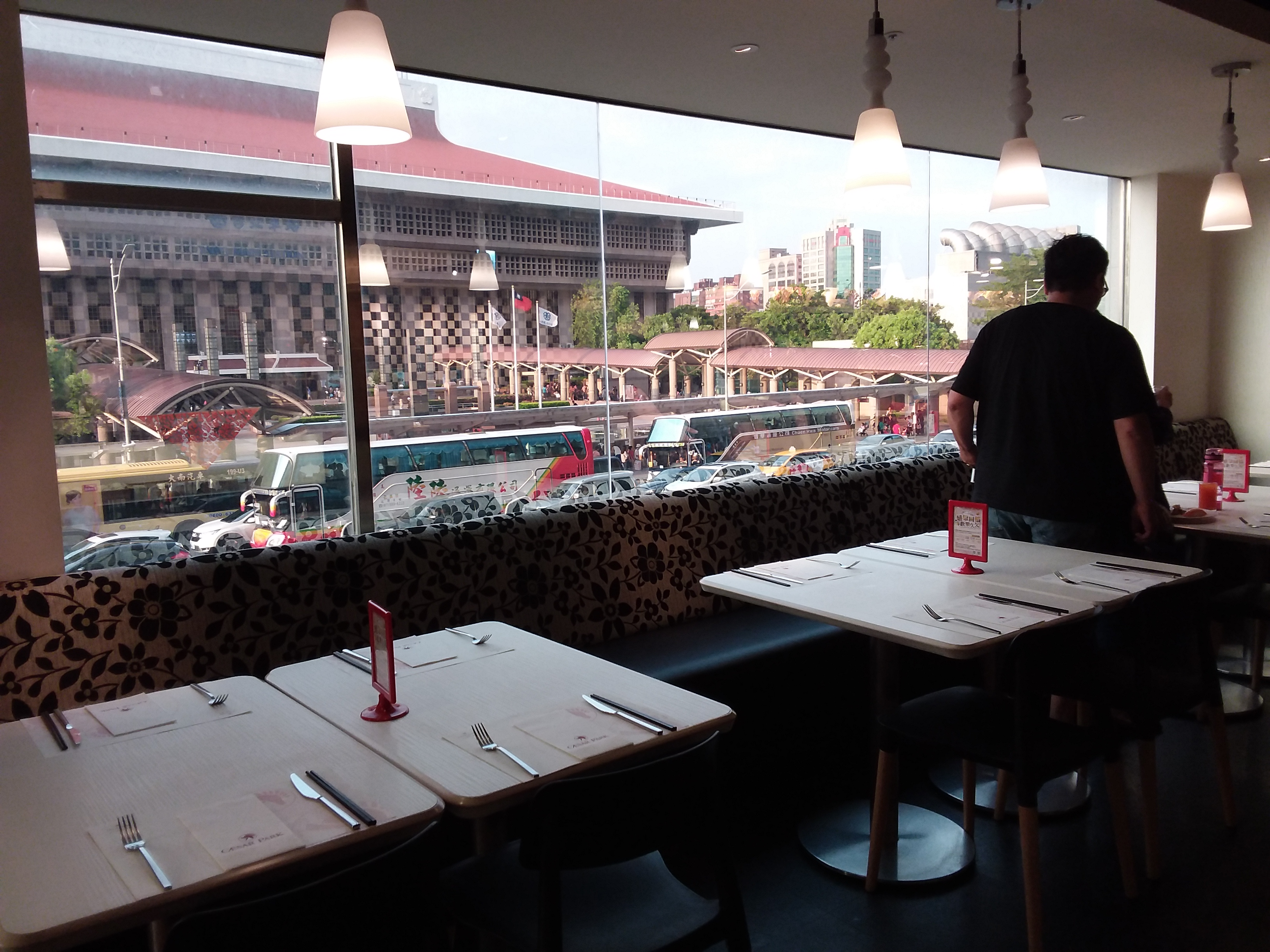
Checkers Buffet

== See also ==
- Caesar Metro Taipei
- Caesar Park Hotel Banqiao
- Mandarin Oriental, Taipei
- The Landis Taipei
