= Chiu Chih-wei =

Taiwanese politician

Chiu Chih-wei MLY
- 邱志偉
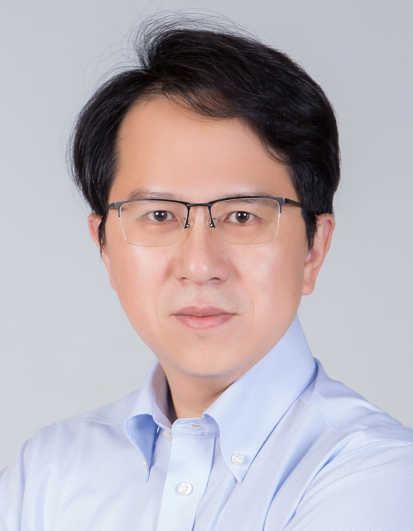

Member of the Legislative Yuan
- Incumbent
- Assumed office 1 February 2012
- Preceded by: Lin Yi-shih
- Constituency: Kaohsiung II

Personal details
- Born: 24 July 1972 (age 54) Kaohsiung, Taiwan
- Party: Democratic Progressive Party
- Education: Tamkang University (LLB, LLM); National Taiwan University (LLM, MBA); National Sun Yat-sen University (PhD); University of Cambridge (MPhil)

Chiu Chih-wei (Chinese: 邱志偉; pinyin: Qiū Zhìwěi; Wade–Giles: Chʻiu¹ Chih⁴-wei³; born 24 July 1972) is a Taiwanese politician and a member of the Legislative Yuan. Of Hakka descent, he is a member of the Democratic Progressive Party. He served as Kaohsiung's chief of bureau of civil affairs between 2007 and 2011. He was elected into the Legislative Yuan representing Kaohsiung 2nd district since 2012. He was reelected in 2016.

== Education ==
After graduating from National Tainan First Senior High School, Chiu graduated from Tamkang University with a Master of Laws (LL.M.) degree and earned a second LL.M. and then a Master of Business Administration (M.B.A.) from National Taiwan University. He later completed doctoral studies at National Sun Yat-sen University, where he earned his Ph.D. in Chinese studies in 2007, and completed further graduate work at the University of Cambridge in England. His doctoral dissertation, completed under political scientist Lin Wen-cheng, was titled, "A Study on the Strategic Relationship between China, the United States and the European Union in the Era of Globalization" (Chinese: 全球化時代中美歐盟戰略關係之研究).

== Parliamentary career ==
Chiu resigned his position as the chief of Kaohsiung Bureau of Civil Affairs in order to run for a seat in the 2012 election. In the 2012 election, he defeated a four-term veteran Lin Yi-shih in the general election, thus elected as the Member of Legislative Yuan for Kaohsiung 2. During his tenure, he served in two committees: Education and Cultural Committee and Foreign Affairs and National Defense Committee.

As the 11th Legislative Yuan opened in 2024, Chiu founded the Taiwan-African Countries Parliamentary Friendship Association and the Taiwan–Central and South American and Caribbean Countries Parliamentary Friendship Association.

== Electoral records ==
Incumbents are in bold

=== 2012 ===
- All registered: 249,535
- Voters (turnout): 194,515 (77.95%)
- Valid (percentage): 192,021 (98.72%)
- Rejected (percentage): 2,494 (1.28%)

Order	Candidate	Party	Votes	Percentage	Elected
1	**Chiu Chih-wei**	Democratic Progressive Party	96,818	50.42%	
2	Sie Jhang-li	Independent politician	2,301	1.20%	
3	Lin Yi-shih	Kuomintang	92,902	48.38%	

=== 2016 ===
- All registered: 256,424
- Voters (turnout): 178,539 (69.63%)
- Valid (percentage): 175,247 (98.16%)
- Rejected (percentage): 3,292 (1.84%)

Order	Candidate	Party	Votes	Percentage	Elected
1	**Chiu Chih-wei**	Democratic Progressive Party	110,819	63.24%	
2	Huang Yun-han	Kuomintang	61,186	34.91%	
3	Huang jin-ling	Chinese Reunification Party	628	0.36%	
4	Li Bai-rong	Trees Party	1,733	0.99%	
5	Ceng Ying-feng	Free Taiwan Party	881	0.50%	
