= Caesar Metro Taipei =

Hotel in Wanhua, Taipei, Taiwan

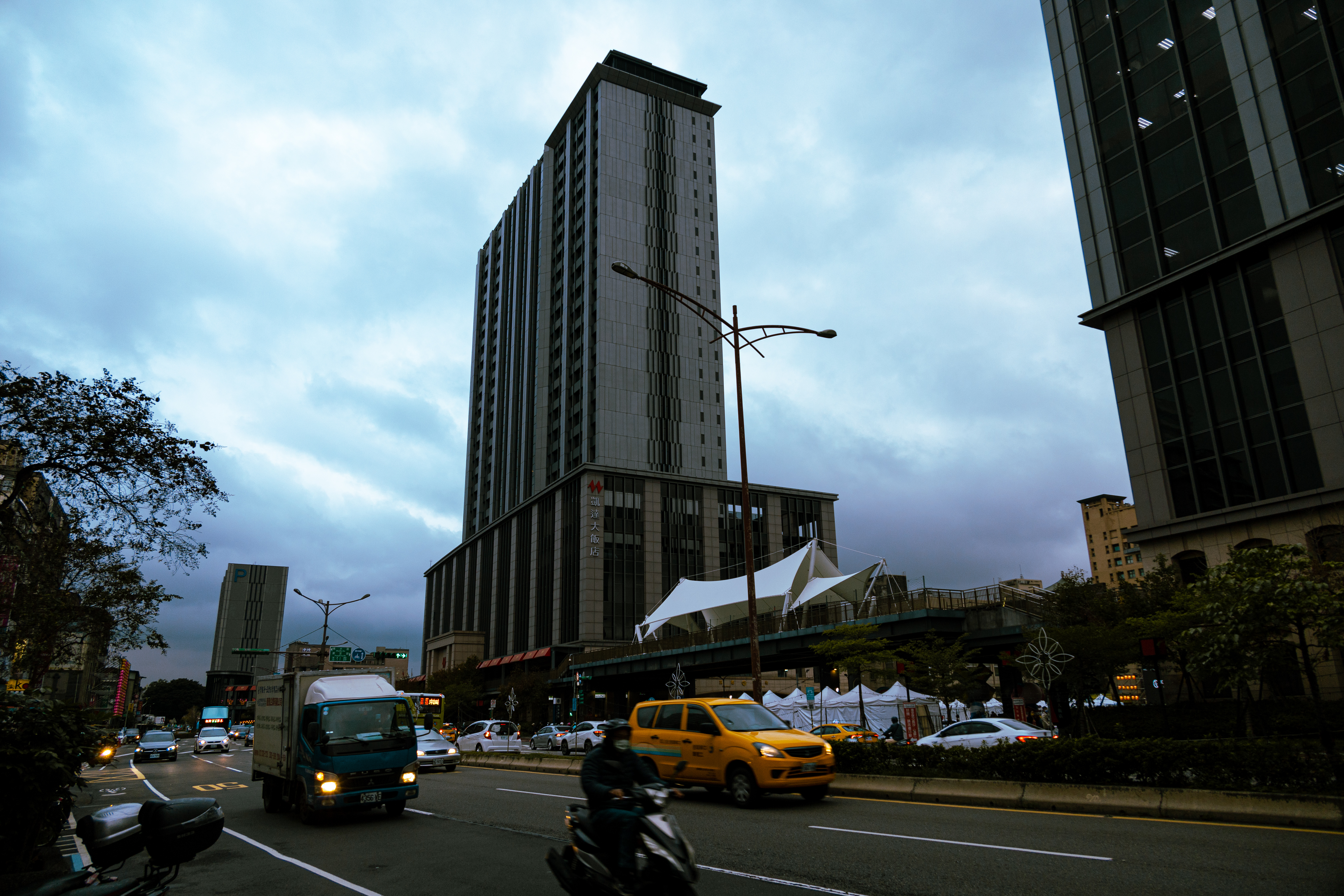

- Location within Taiwan

General information
- Location: No. 167, Bangka Boulevard, Wanhua District, Taipei, Taiwan
- Coordinates: 25.0334°N 121.5001°E
- Opening: November 24, 2017
- Management: Caesar Park Hotels & Resorts

Technical details
- Floor count: 30
- Floor area: 43,954.53 m^{2} (473,122.6 sq ft)

Design and construction
- Architect: Chu-Yuan Lee

Other information
- Number of rooms: 750
- Number of restaurants: 2

Website
- Caesar Metro Taipei Website

Caesar Metro Taipei (Chinese：凱達大飯店) is a skyscraper hotel located on Bangka Boulevard, Wanhua District, Taipei, Taiwan, near Wanhua railway station, which opened on November 24, 2017. Designed by Taiwanese architect Chu-Yuan Lee, the height of the hotel is 105.85 m (347.3 ft), with a floor area of 43,954.53 m^{2} (473,122.6 sq ft).

== Facilities ==
The hotel has 750 guest rooms, and 30 floors with two basements. The hotel is operated by Caesar Park Hotels & Resorts and provides 2 Chinese/Western restaurants, and ballroom with 7.2 m (24 ft) high ceilings. Facilities include an outdoor swimming pool and fitness gym.

=== Restaurants & Bars ===
- Jia Yan: Chinese restaurant featuring traditional Taiwanese and Cantonese cuisine located on the third floor.
- Metro Buffet: Buffet restaurant serving a wide variety of both international and local flavors located on the fifth floor.
- Bar 98: Bar offering a selection of wine, cocktails and exquisite snacks, located on the fifth floor.

== See also ==
- Caesar Park Hotel Banqiao
- Caesar Park Taipei
