= Taoyuan–Zhongli metropolitan area =

Metropolitan area in Northwestern Taiwan

Coordinates: 24.983°N 121.3°E

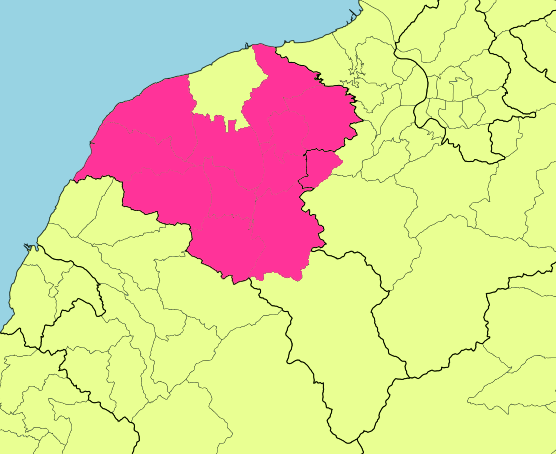
Taoyuan–Zhongli metropolitan area

Taoyuan–Zhongli metropolitan area (traditional Chinese: 桃園中壢都會區; simplified Chinese: 桃园中坜都会区; pinyin: Táoyuán Zhōnglì Dūhuì Qū) is the metropolitan area located in northwestern Taiwan, which encompasses most of Taoyuan City as well as parts of neighbouring urban districts of New Taipei such as Yingge and Linkou. The districts of Taoyuan and Zhongli are typical twin cities within the region which share approximate population sizes and similar function of urban centres, and have been respectively emerging to regional commercial centres on the periphery of the northern and southern parts of the municipality. Many industrial parks and tech company headquarters settle in this region.

Taoyuan City witnessed its fastest population growth of Taiwan in the past few decades, and since 2014 it has been promoted to a special municipality from county status. It has become the fourth largest metropolitan area in Taiwan. In some sources, Taoyuan–Zhongli metropolitan area is occasionally viewed as an extent of Taipei metropolitan area due to its proximity and being complementary to each other economically, especially the Taoyuan International Airport is a major hub airport which serves the entirety of northern Taiwan.

== Definition ==
Taoyuan–Zhongli metropolitan area, as defined by the government before 2010, includes the following areas:

Taoyuan City		New Taipei City
Northern Taoyuan; Taoyuan District (core city); Bade District; Daxi District; Guishan District; Luzhu District; (Dayuan District)	Southern Taoyuan; Zhongli District (core city); Guanyin District; Longtan District; Pingzhen District; Yangmei District; Xinwu District	Yingge District

However, since 2010, the term is no longer in official usage.
