= Qieding District =

District in Kaohsiung, Taiwan

Coordinates: 22°54′24.43″N 120°10′57.37″E

Qieding 茄萣區 (also spelled Cieding)
- District
- Qieding District
- Qieding District in Kaohsiung City
- Country: Taiwan
- Region: Southern Taiwan

Population (October 2023)
  - Total: 29,273
- Website: cheting-en.kcg.gov.tw

Qieding District (or Jiading; Chinese: 茄萣區; Hanyu Pinyin: Qiédìng Qū; Tongyong Pinyin: Ciédìng Cyu; Pe̍h-ōe-jī: Ka-tiāⁿ-khu) is a coastal suburban district in Kaohsiung, Taiwan.

== Name and pronunciation ==
=== Etymology ===
One theory is that it is named for a type of local mangrove. Another is that it derived from a Makattao aboriginal name, written as "Cattia" or "Cattea" by Europeans, meaning "place of many fish" (literally "ten fish"). This was then rendered as Ka-tang-tiāⁿ-á (茄苳萣仔) and Ka-tiāⁿ-á (茄萣仔) in Taiwanese Hokkien and also Ka-tiāⁿ (茄萣) or Ka-têng (茄藤) with both sets of characters also referring to types of Avicennia (cf. 海茄苳 Avicennia marina, 海茄朾).

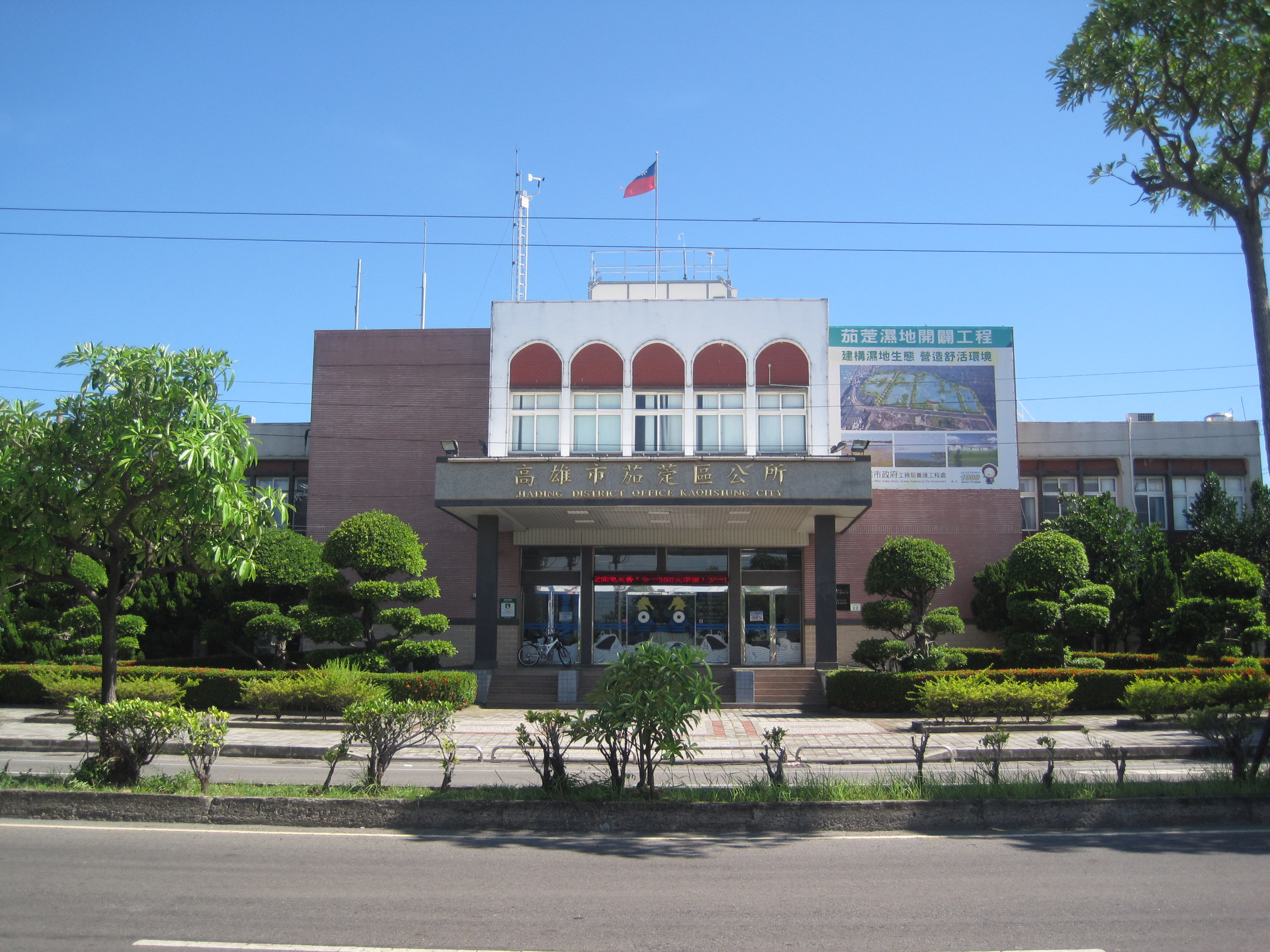
The Cieding District Office with English signage reading "Jiading District Office Kaohsiung City"

=== Pronunciation and Romanization ===
Traditionally, the name is pronounced Ka-tiāⁿ in Taiwanese and Jiādìng in Mandarin. Following the 1945 handover of Taiwan, the name was romanized as Chiating via the Wade-Giles system. The later systems MPS II and Tongyong Pinyin yielded Jiading, which is seen on street signs and signs on the district office and the local elementary and junior high schools.

However outside of Jiading, the pronunciation of Qiédìng in Mandarin is common, using an alternate reading of the first Chinese character in the name (Chinese: 茄; pinyin: qié; Pe̍h-ōe-jī: kiô; referring to aubergine/eggplant). With the adoption of Hanyu Pinyin for Taiwanese place names in 2009, the name was officially rendered as Qieding by the Ministry of the Interior, but has not achieved uniform implementation. Buses from Kaohsiung and Tainan have the name Romanized with the non-standard "Chieding". The district's website uses several non-standard spellings including "Cieding", "Cheting", and "Chieting".

== History ==
From 1920 to 1945, the district was governed under Konai village (湖内庄), Okayama District, Takao Prefecture.

After the handover of Taiwan from Japan to the Republic of China in 1945, Qieding was organized as a rural township of Kaohsiung County. On 25 December 2010, Kaohsiung County merged with Kaohsiung City and Qieding was upgraded to a district of the city.

== Administrative divisions ==
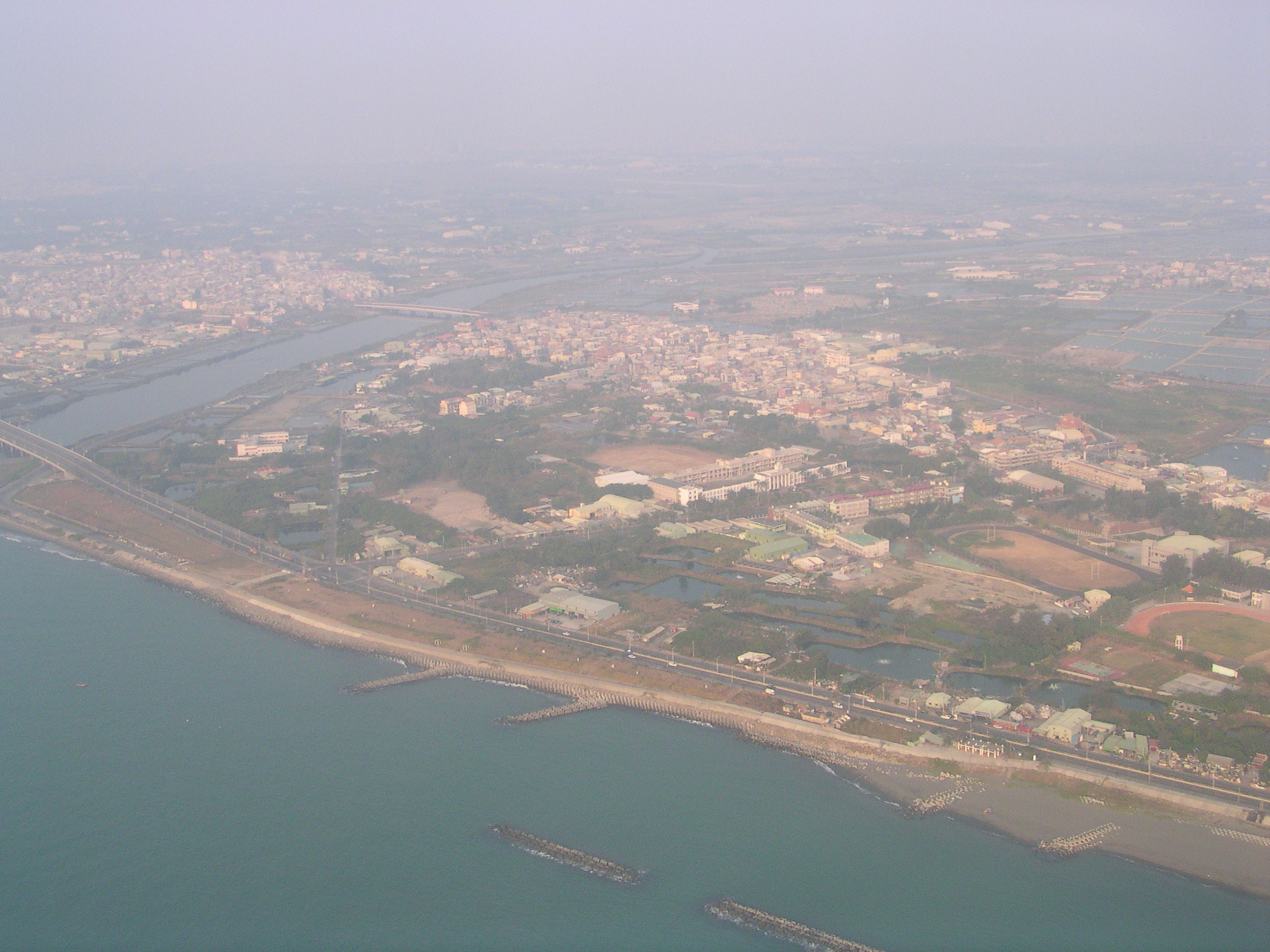
An aerial view of northern Cieding District where the Erren River reaches the Taiwan Strait; north of the river, in the left hinterground of the photo, is the South District of Tainan City

- Baiyun Village (白雲里 Mandarin: Báiyún Lǐ; Taiwanese: Pe̍h-hûn Lí)
- Baoding Village (保定里 Bǎodìng Lǐ; Pó-tiāⁿ Lí)
- Dading Village (大定里 Dàdìng Lǐ; Tāi-tiāⁿ Lí)
- Fude Village (福德里 Fúdé Lǐ; Hok-tek Lí)
- Guangding Village (光定里 Guāngdìng Lǐ; Kong-tiāⁿ Lí)
- Hexie Village (和協里 Héxié Lǐ; Hô-hia̍p Lí)
- Jia'an Village (嘉安里 Jiā'ān Lǐ; Ka-an Lí)
- Jiaci Village (嘉賜里 Jiācì Lǐ; Ka-sù Lí)
- Jiading Village (嘉定里 Jiādìng Lǐ; Ka-tiāⁿ Lí)
- Jiafu Village (嘉福里 Jiāfú Lǐ; Ka-hok Lí)
- Jiale Village (嘉樂里 Jiālè Lǐ; Ka-lo̍k Lí)
- Jiatai Village (嘉泰里 Jiātài Lǐ; Ka-thài Lí)
- Jiding Village (吉定里 Jídìng Lǐ; Kiat-tiāⁿ Lí)
- Qilou Village (崎漏里 Qílòu Lǐ; Kiā-làu Lí)
- Wanfu Village (萬福里 Wànfú Lǐ; Bān-hok Lí)

== Politics ==
The district is part of Kaohsiung City Constituency II electoral district for Legislative Yuan.

== Infrastructure ==
- Hsinta Power Plant

== Tourist attractions ==
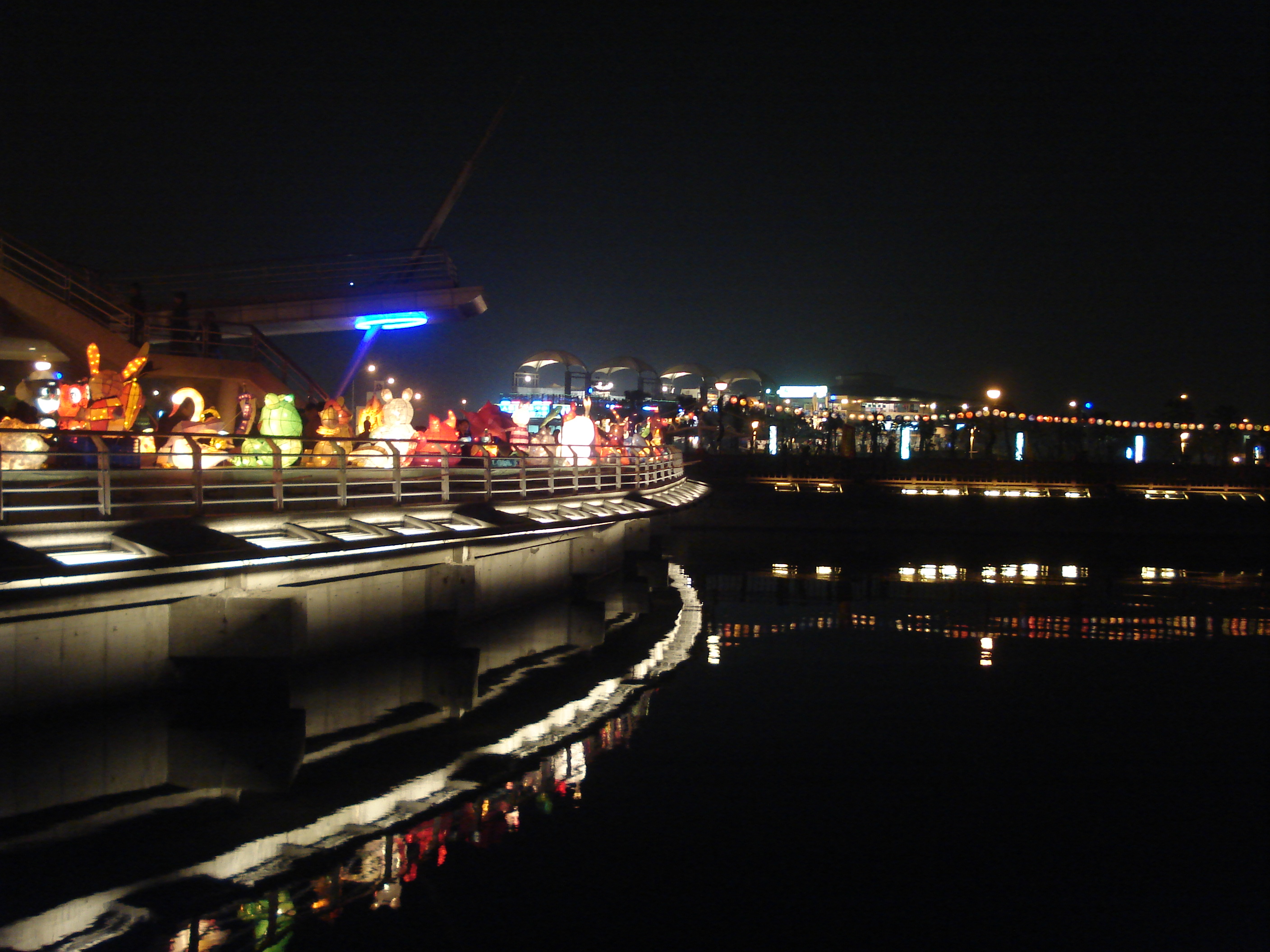
Lovers Wharf at Hsinta Harbor

- Jiading Wetlands
- Lovers Wharf
- Hsinta Harbor Fish Market
- Kuo Chang-hsi Knife and Sword Museum
- Wanfu Temple (白砂崙萬福宮)

== Notable natives ==
- Lin Yi-shih, Secretary-General of Executive Yuan (2012)
- Wang Yu-yun, Mayor of Kaohsiung (1973–1981)

== See also ==
- Kaohsiung
