= Jiading Wetlands =

Wetland in Qieding, Kaohsiung, Taiwan

- 茄萣濕地 (Chinese)
- Location within Kaohsiung
- Location: Qieding, Kaohsiung, Taiwan
- Coordinates: 22°53′01.0″N 120°12′02.5″E
- Type: Wetland
- Built: 2011

The Jiading Wetlands, also known as the Qieding Wetlands, (traditional Chinese: 茄萣濕地; simplified Chinese: 茄萣湿地; pinyin: Jiādìng Shīdì) is a wetland in Qieding District, Kaohsiung, Taiwan. It provides a winter home to a substantial number of black-faced spoonbills.

== History ==
The wetland was used to be a salt evaporation pond. In 2011, the Ministry of the Interior declared the area to be a national heritage. In July 2014, the Kaohsiung City Government decided to construct road leading to the area to accommodate the birdwatching activity and the growing popularity among visitors. In the same year, local residents filed a petition to avoid the construction.

== Ecology ==
In early 2015, the wetland is home to 162 spoonbills, which counted about 8% of the global population.

== See also ==
- Geography of Taiwan
