= Tainan metropolitan area =

Metropolitan area in Taiwan

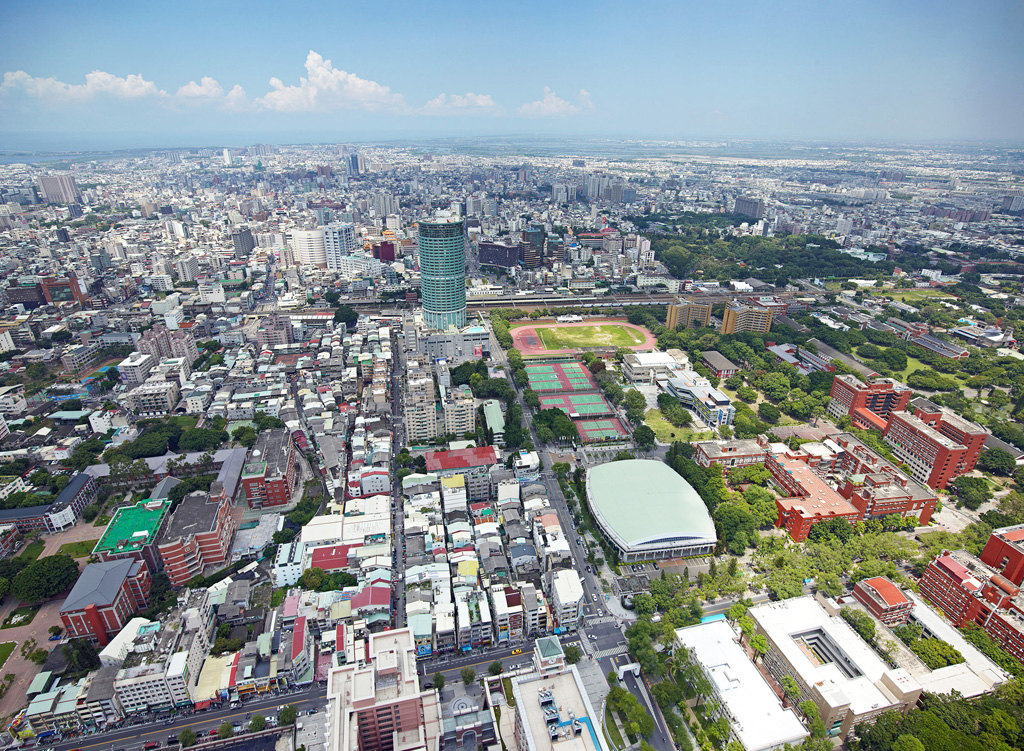
- Downtown Tainan

- Tainan metropolitan area in yellow
- Coordinates: 23°00′N 120°13′E
- Country: Taiwan
- Major Cities: Tainan

Area
  - Metro: 601.89 km^{2} (232.39 sq mi)

Population (End of March 2018)
  - Metro: 1,359,898
  - Metro density: 2,259.35/km^{2} (5,851.7/sq mi)

Tainan metropolitan area (traditional Chinese: 臺南都會區; simplified Chinese: 台南都会区; pinyin: Táinán Dūhuì Qū) is the urban area of Tainan City in southern Taiwan.

== Definition ==
According to the definition of metropolitan areas formerly used by the government, Tainan metropolitan area includes the following areas:

Tainan City (core city)		Kaohsiung City
Anding District; Annan District; Anping District; Cigu District; East District; Guanmiao District	Gueiren District; North District; Rende District; South District; West Central District; Yongkang District	Hunei District; Qieding District

However, since the merger of Tainan City and the former Tainan County, the term is no longer in official usage.
