= Kaohsiung City Constituency 2 =

Constituency of the Legislative Yuan of Taiwan

- Single-member constituency for the Legislative Yuan
- District(s): Qieding, Hunei, Lujhu, Yong'an, Gangshan, Mituo, Zihguan, Ciaotou
- Electorate: 263,401 (2024 election)

Current constituency
- Created: 2008 (as Kaohsiung County Constituency 2); 2010 (current name)
- Party: DPP
- Member: Chiu Chih-wei

Kaohsiung City Constituency 2 (Chinese: 高雄市第二選舉區) is one of the 73 regional constituencies represented in the Legislative Yuan, the national legislature of Taiwan. It was created in 2008 (as Kaohsiung County Constituency 2) following a series of constitutional reforms, and elects one legislator, through first-past-the-post voting, to the Legislative Yuan. It has been represented by Chiu Chih-wei of the Democratic Progressive Party since 2012.

== Legislators ==
Election	Legislator	Party
2008 - 2012	Lin Yi-shih	Kuomintang
2012	Chiu Chih-wei	Democratic Progressive Party

== Election results ==

=== 2008 (Note: Named Kaohsiung County Constituency 2, boundaries unchanged) ===
2008 Taiwanese legislative election: Kaohsiung County 2
Candidate	Party	Votes	%
Lin Yi-shih	Kuomintang	84,659	55.27
Yu Cheng-hsien	Democratic Progressive Party	65,257	42.61
Liu Cheng-wei	Taiwan Farmers' Party	3,250	2.12
Total		153,166	100.00
Valid votes		153,166	97.91
Invalid/blank votes		3,274	2.09
Total votes		156,440	100.00
Registered voters/turnout		242,349	64.55
Majority		19,402	12.66
Kuomintang win			

=== 2012 ===
* denotes the incumbent representative

2012 Taiwanese legislative election: Kaohsiung 2
Candidate	Party	Votes	%	+/–
Chiu Chih-wei	Democratic Progressive Party	96,818	50.42	▲7.81
Lin Yi-shih*	Kuomintang	92,902	48.38	▼6.89
Hsieh Chang-li	Independent	2,301	1.20	NEW
Total		192,021	100.00	–
Valid votes		192,021	98.72	
Invalid/blank votes		2,494	1.28	
Total votes		194,515	100.00	
Registered voters/turnout		249,535	77.95	
Majority		3,916	2.04	
Democratic Progressive Party gain from Kuomintang				

=== 2016 ===
* denotes the incumbent representative

2016 Taiwanese legislative election: Kaohsiung 2
Candidate	Party	Votes	%	+/–
Chiu Chih-wei*	Democratic Progressive Party	110,819	63.24	▲12.82
Huang Yun-han	Kuomintang	61,186	34.91	▼13.47
Li Pai-jung	Trees Party	1,733	0.99	NEW
Tseng Ying-feng	Free Taiwan Party	881	0.50	NEW
Huang Chin-ling	Chinese Unification Promotion Party	628	0.36	NEW
Total		175,247	100.00	–
Valid votes		175,247	98.16	
Invalid/blank votes		3,292	1.84	
Total votes		178,539	100.00	
Registered voters/turnout		256,424	69.63	
Majority		49,633	28.33	
Democratic Progressive Party hold				

=== 2020 ===
* denotes the incumbent representative

2020 Taiwanese legislative election: Kaohsiung 2
Candidate	Party	Votes	%	+/–
Chiu Chih-wei*	Democratic Progressive Party	126,469	63.17	▼0.07
Huang Yun-han	Kuomintang	70,867	35.40	▲0.49
Li Pai-jung	Taiwan Renewal Party	2,871	1.43	NEW
Total		200,207	100.00	–
Valid votes		200,207	98.11	
Invalid/blank votes		3,848	1.89	
Total votes		204,055	100.00	
Registered voters/turnout		260,269	78.40	
Majority		55,602	27.77	
Democratic Progressive Party hold				

=== 2024 ===
* denotes the incumbent representative

2024 Taiwanese legislative election: Kaohsiung 2
Candidate	Party	Votes	%	+/–
Chiu Chih-wei*	Democratic Progressive Party	117,992	63.38	▲0.21
Huang Yunhan	Kuomintang	68,168	36.62	▲1.22
Total		186,160	100.00	–
Valid votes		186,160	97.43	
Invalid/blank votes		4,920	2.57	
Total votes		191,080	100.00	
Registered voters/turnout		263,401	72.54	
Majority		49,824	26.76	
Democratic Progressive Party hold				
