= Hsinchu metropolitan area =

Area in Hsinchu City, Taiwan

Hsinchu Metropolitan Area
- Urban
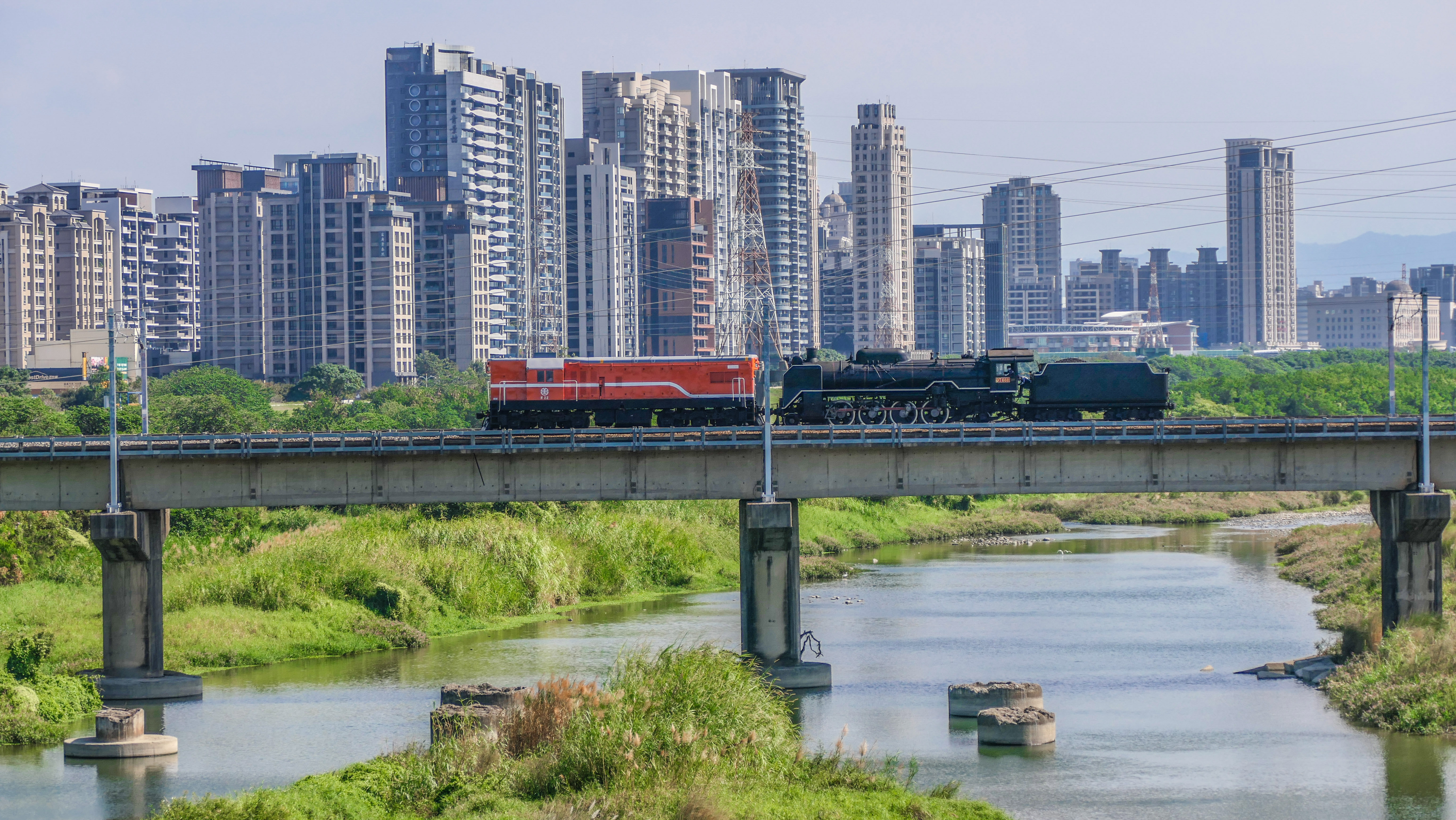

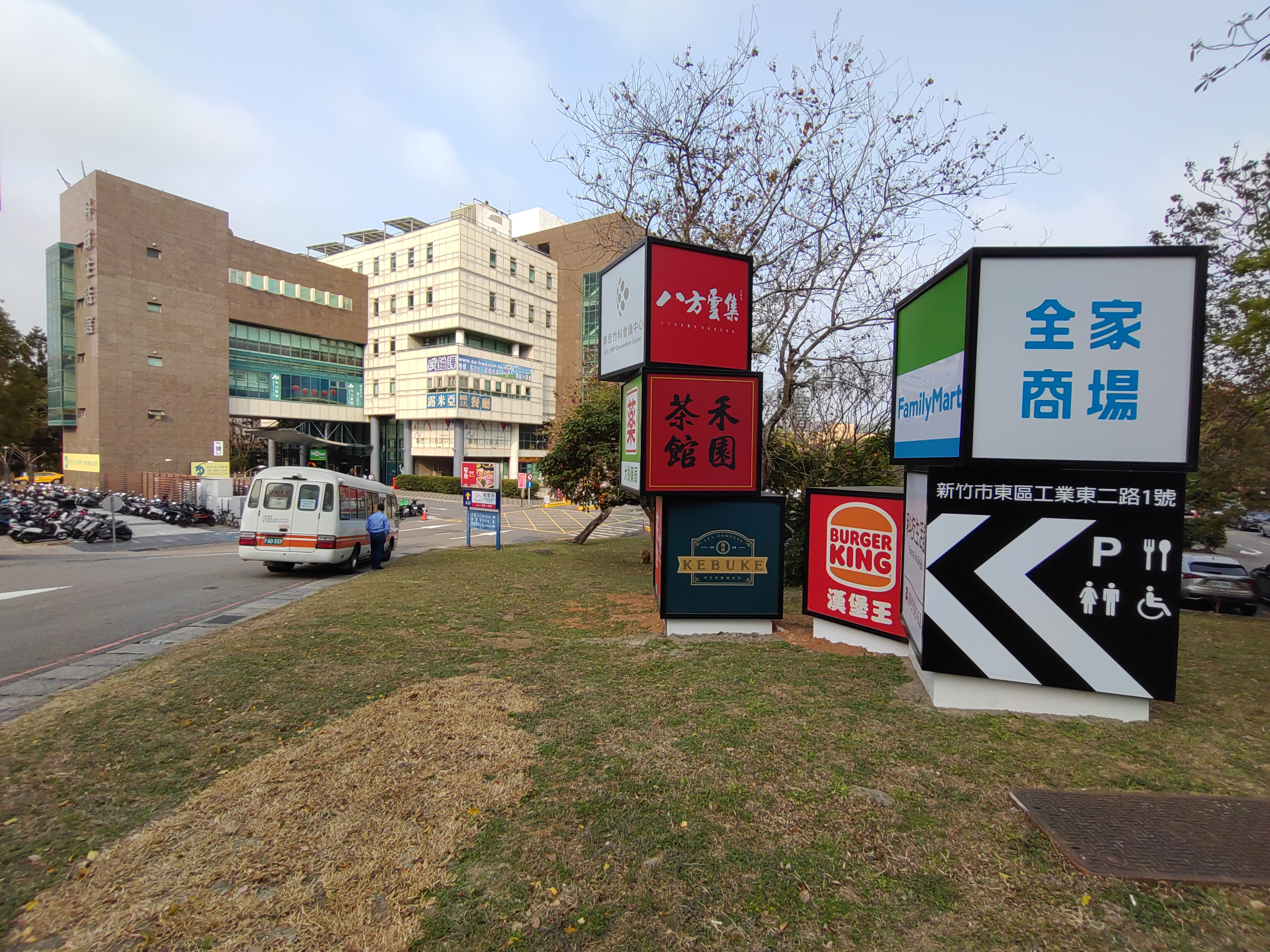
- Coordinates: 24°48′N 120°58′E
- Country: Taiwan
- Main City: Hsinchu City

Area
  - Metro: 703.4429 km^{2} (271.6008 sq mi)

Population (2020)
  - Urban: 1,184,997
  - Metro density: 1,684.567/km^{2} (4,363.01/sq mi)

Hsinchu metropolitan area (Chinese: 新竹都會區; pinyin: Xīnzhú Dūhuì Qū) is the metropolitan area of the city include Hsinchu in northern Taiwan.

The population of the metro area in 2016 was around 1,000,000, and when including Zhunan and Toufen in neighboring Miaoli County was over 1.18 million.

== Definition ==
According to the definition of metropolitan areas formerly used by the Republic of China (Taiwan) government, Hsinchu metropolitan area includes the following areas:

Hsinchu City (core city)	Hsinchu County
East District; North District; Xiangshan District	Zhubei City; Zhudong Township; Guanxi Township; Xinpu Township; Hukou Township; Xinfeng Township; Baoshan Township; Beipu Township; Hengshan Township; Qionglin Township

However, since 2010, the term is no longer in official usage.
