= Taichung–Changhua metropolitan area =

Metropolitan area in Taiwan

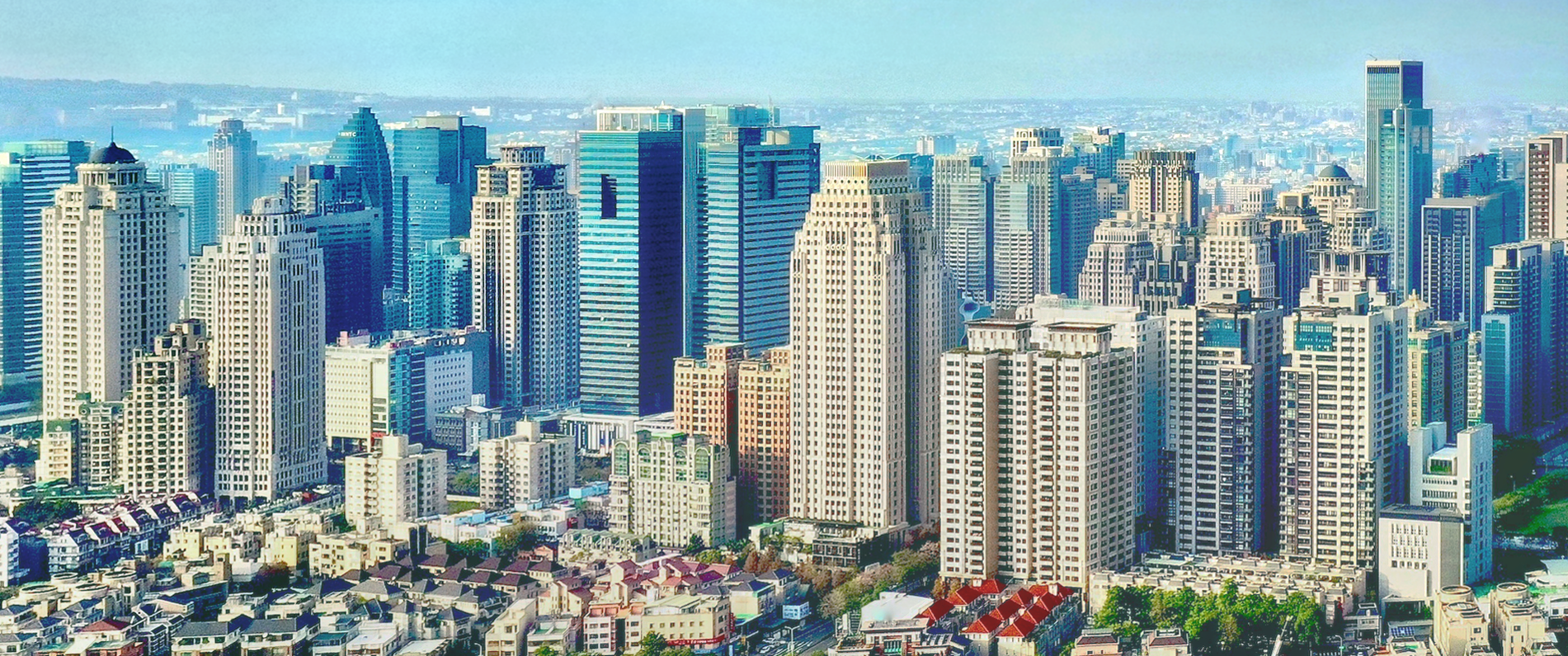
- Downtown Taichung (Taichung's 7th Redevelopment Zone)

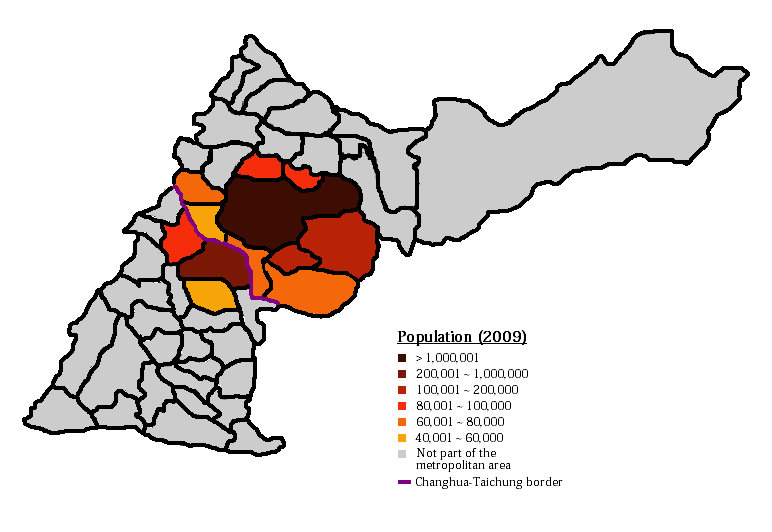
- Coordinates: 24°07′N 120°40′E
- Country: Republic of China (Taiwan)
- Major Cities: Taichung; Changhua

Area
  - Metro: 1,801.2517 km^{2} (695.4672 sq mi)

Population (End of April 2019)
  - Metro: 4,280,000
  - Metro density: 2,099.78/km^{2} (5,438.4/sq mi)

The Taichung–Changhua metropolitan area (Chinese: 臺中彰化都會區; pinyin: Táizhōng Zhānghuà Dūhuì Qū) is the second largest metropolitan area of Taiwan. Prior to city-county merger, it was officially defined as follows:

Taichung City (core city)		Changhua County
Beitun District; Central District; Dadu District; Dali District; Daya District; East District; Longjing District; Nantun District	North District; South District; Taiping District; Tanzi District; Xitun District; West District; Wufeng District; Wuri District	Changhua City (core city); Hemei Township; Huatan Township

Since the merger of Taichung City and the former Taichung County, the term is no longer in official usage.
