= List of metropolitan areas in Taiwan =

The government of the Republic of China (Taiwan) formerly used an official statistical classification of metropolitan areas. It identified seven metropolitan areas: five major metropolitan areas—Taipei–Keelung, Taoyuan–Zhongli, Taichung–Changhua, Tainan, and Kaohsiung—and two secondary metropolitan areas, Hsinchu and Chiayi. The classification ceased to apply on 25 December 2010.

Under the former definition, a metropolitan area was an economically and socially integrated area centred on one or more core cities and having a population of at least 300,000. Core cities and their surrounding satellite cities and townships were identified using population, urbanisation and commuting criteria. Metropolitan areas with at least one million inhabitants were classified as major metropolitan areas, while those with between 300,000 and one million inhabitants were classified as secondary metropolitan areas.

== Former official classification ==
The metropolitan-area classification formed part of the Standard Classification of Statistical Areas of the Republic of China. The classification was discontinued on 25 December 2010; the government stated that the classifications had become outdated, that government agencies generally published statistics using administrative divisions instead, and that revising the system was not considered cost-effective.

A metropolitan area was defined as an economically and socially integrated area containing one or more core cities, with a total population of at least 300,000.

A core city was required to meet three conditions:

- a population of at least 200,000;
- at least 70% of its residents living in an urbanised area; and
- at least 70% of its employed residents working within the city.

A city or township outside a core city could be classified as a satellite city or township if it was contiguous with the core city or its other satellite municipalities and met one of the classification's commuting or urbanisation criteria. These included having at least 10% of its employed residents commute to the core city, or having at least 5% commute there while at least 40% of its residents lived in the same urbanised area as the core city.

Metropolitan areas were named for their largest core city. They were divided by population into major metropolitan areas, with populations of at least one million, and secondary metropolitan areas, with populations of at least 300,000 but below one million. The classification identified five major metropolitan areas—Taipei–Keelung, Taoyuan–Zhongli, Taichung–Changhua, Tainan and Kaohsiung—and two secondary metropolitan areas, Hsinchu and Chiayi.

== Metropolitan areas in Taiwan ==
According to the Ministry of the Interior, the seven metropolitan areas were:

| Name | Chinese | Population | Percentage of total population | City rankings |
|---|---|---|---|---|
| Taipei–Keelung metropolitan area | 臺北基隆大都會區 | 7,048,243 | 30.00% | 1 |
| Taichung–Changhua metropolitan area | 大臺中都會區 | 4,280,000 | 17.14% | 2 |
| Kaohsiung metropolitan area | 高雄都會區 | 2,367,591 | 10.08% | 3 |
| Taoyuan–Zhongli metropolitan area | 桃園中壢大都會區 | 2,229,354 | 8.93% | 4 |
| Tainan metropolitan area | 臺南大都會區 | 1,886,000 | 5.54% | 5 |
| Hsinchu metropolitan area | 新竹次都會區 | 1,121,693 | 4.77% | 6 |
| Chiayi metropolitan area | 嘉義次都會區 | 475,465 | 2.02% | 7 |
