= Chiayi metropolitan area =

Urban area surrounding Chiayi City, Taiwan

Chiayi metropolitan area

Chiayi metropolitan area (Chinese: 嘉義都會區; pinyin: Jiāyì Dūhuì Qū) is the urban area surrounding Chiayi City.

== Definition ==
According to the definition of metropolitan areas formerly used by the Republic of China government, the Chiayi metropolitan area includes the following areas:

Chiayi City (core city)	Chiayi County
East District; West District	Minxiong Township; Shuishang Township; Zhongpu Township; Taibao City

However, since 2010, the term is no longer in official usage.

== Economy ==
It is a sub-urban area developed by industries such as industry, forestry, sugar, agriculture, fishery, and tourism.

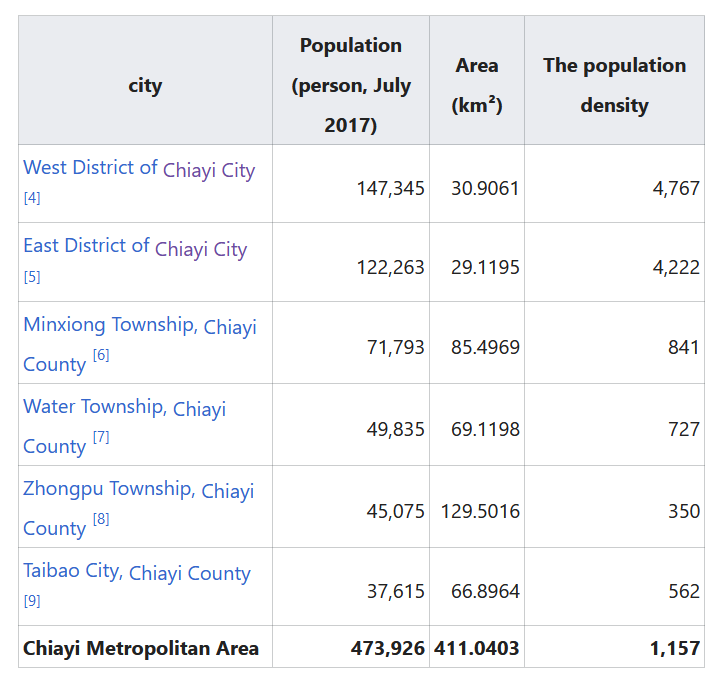
Demographics as of 2017
