= Taipei–Keelung metropolitan area =

Large metro area encompassing Taipei, Taiwan

Greater Taipei Area
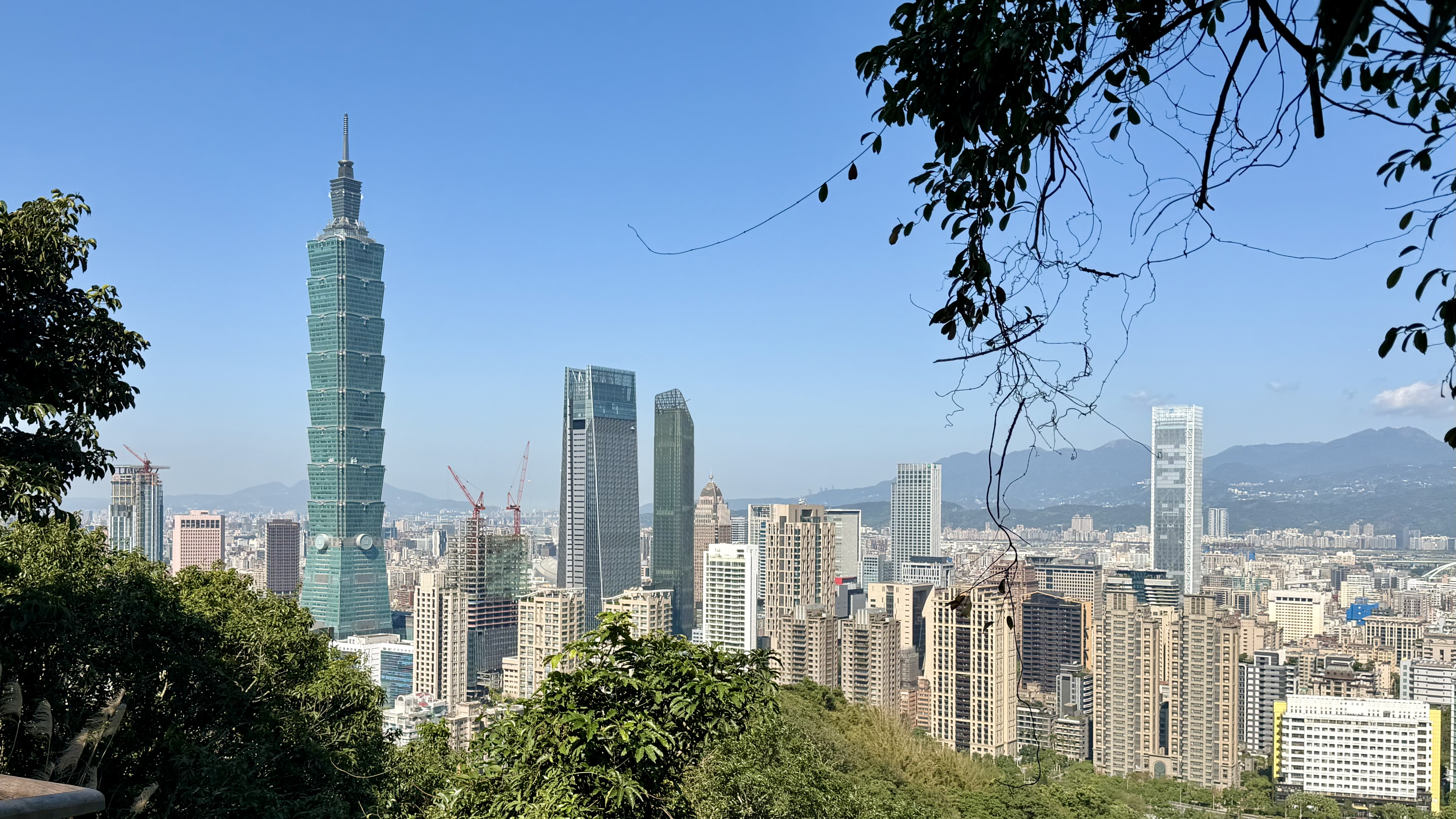
- Taipei skyline

- Coordinates: 25°2′N 121°38′E
- Country: Taiwan
- Primary administrative divisions: Taipei

Area
  - Metro: 2,457.13 km^{2} (948.70 sq mi)

Population (End of January 2019)
  - Metro: 7,034,084
  - Metro density: 2,862.7/km^{2} (7,414/sq mi)

GDP
  - Metro: US$ 407.838 billion
  - Per capita: US$ 44,050

The Taipei–Keelung metropolitan area (Chinese: 臺北基隆都會區; pinyin: Táiběi-Jīlóng Dūhùiqū) also commonly known as Greater Taipei Area (Chinese: 大臺北地區; pinyin: Dà Táiběi Dìqū) is the largest metropolitan area in Taiwan. It is composed of 3 administrative divisions: Taipei, New Taipei City and Keelung. The region encompasses an area of 2,457.13 square kilometers (948.70 sq mi) and a population of 7,034,084 as of 2019. It is the most populous and the most densely populated metropolitan area in Taiwan, with one-third of Taiwanese people living and working there. In some sources, Taoyuan City is included in the metropolitan area on a broader extent, but is usually considered as a metropolitan area of its own.

The region is the epicenter of Taiwanese culture, economy, education and government. Designated as a global city, the region exerts a significant impact on commerce, finance, media, art, fashion, research, technology, education, and entertainment, both locally and internationally. As a diplomatic center, it is the home to all consulates and embassies in Taiwan. Its economic power makes the region the country's premier commercial and financial center as well as in the region of East Asia. Considered to be a global city and rated as an Alpha - City by GaWC, Taipei is part of a major high-tech industrial area. Railways, highways, airports, and bus lines connect Taipei with all parts of the island. The metropolitan area is served by two airports – Songshan and Taoyuan.

== Definition ==
Division name	Population (31 January 2019)	Area (km²)	Density (per km²)
Taipei City	2,666,908	271.80	9,812.0
New Taipei City	3,997,189	2,052.57	1,947.4
Keelung City	369,987	132.76	2,786.9
Taipei–Keelung metropolitan area	7,034,084	2,457.13	2,862.7
Taoyuan City	2,223,733	1,220.95	1,821.3
Taipei–Keelung–Taoyuan metropolitan area	9,257,817	3,678.08	2,517.0

Some international reports consider Taipei–Keelung–Taoyuan (臺北基隆桃園都會區; Táiběi–Jīlóng–Táoyuán Dūhùiqū) as the unified metropolitan area.

== Geography ==
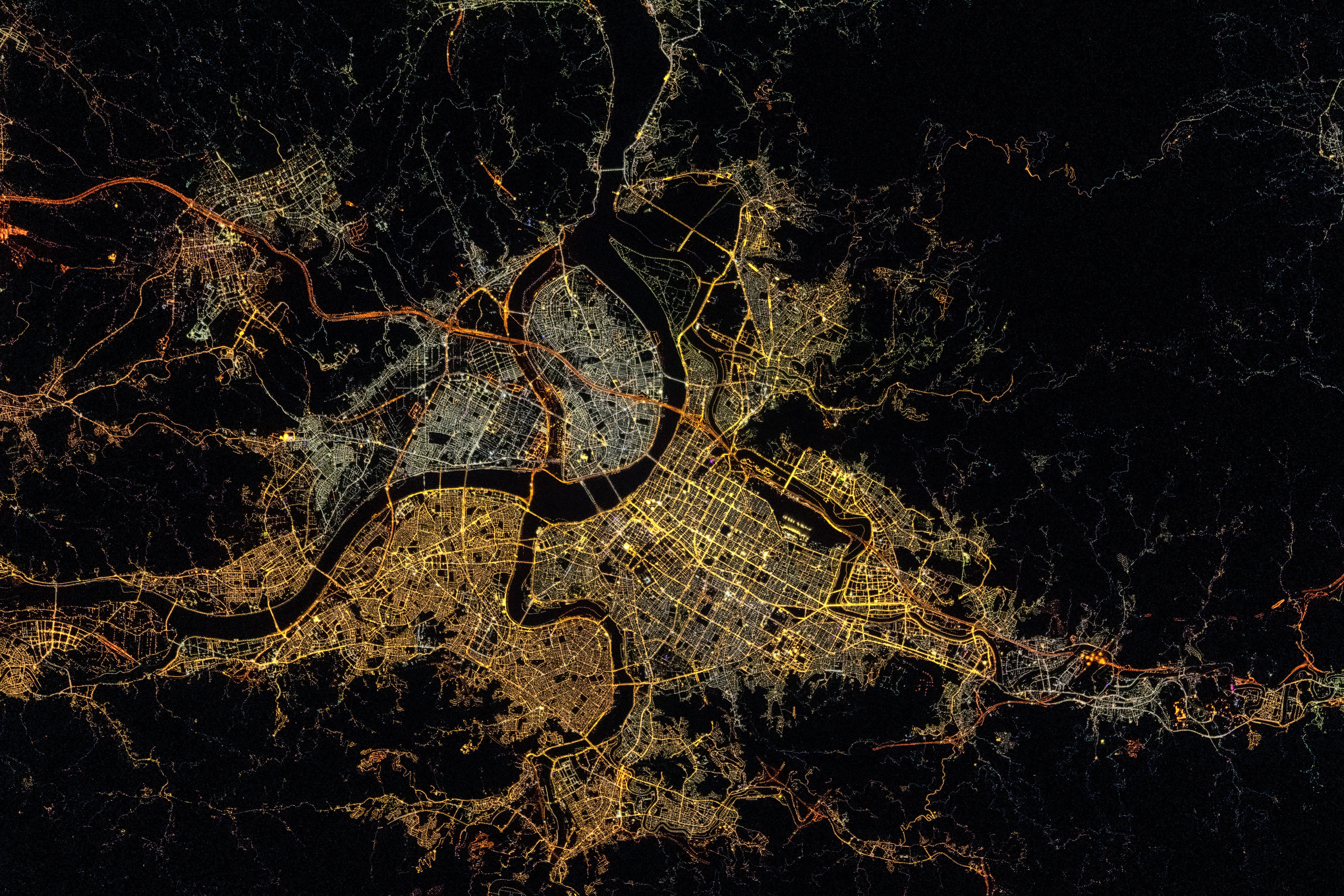
Satellite image of Taipei and greater area

Due to the geographical characteristics of the area, the Taipei–Keelung metropolitan area roughly corresponds to areas located within the Taipei Basin. Taipei City serves as the core of the metropolitan area where the government of Taiwan and major commercial districts are located.

== Geographical Subdivision ==
The metropolitan area contains Taipei City, Keelung City, and New Taipei City (surrounding the two previous cities). The geographical subdivisions are listed as follows:

Northwest in New Taipei City: Linkou; Luzhou; Sanchong; Taishan; Xinzhuang; Wugu	North in New Taipei City: Bali; Sanzhi; Shimen; Tamsui; in Taipei City: Beitou; Shilin	East in Keelung City: Anle; Nuannuan; Qidu; Ren'ai; Xinyi; Zhongshan; Zhongzheng; in Taipei City: Nangang; Neihu; in New Taipei City: Gongliao; Jinshan; Pingxi; Ruifang; Shuangxi; Wanli; Xizhi
Northwest in New Taipei City: Linkou; Luzhou; Sanchong; Taishan; Xinzhuang; Wugu	Center in Taipei City: Da'an; Datong; Songshan; Wanhua; Xinyi; Zhongshan; Zhongzheng	East in Keelung City: Anle; Nuannuan; Qidu; Ren'ai; Xinyi; Zhongshan; Zhongzheng; in Taipei City: Nangang; Neihu; in New Taipei City: Gongliao; Jinshan; Pingxi; Ruifang; Shuangxi; Wanli; Xizhi
Southwest in New Taipei City: Banqiao; Sanxia; Shulin; Tucheng; Yingge	Center in Taipei City: Da'an; Datong; Songshan; Wanhua; Xinyi; Zhongshan; Zhongzheng	East in Keelung City: Anle; Nuannuan; Qidu; Ren'ai; Xinyi; Zhongshan; Zhongzheng; in Taipei City: Nangang; Neihu; in New Taipei City: Gongliao; Jinshan; Pingxi; Ruifang; Shuangxi; Wanli; Xizhi
Southwest in New Taipei City: Banqiao; Sanxia; Shulin; Tucheng; Yingge	South in Taipei City: Wenshan; in New Taipei City: Shenkeng; Shiding; Wulai; Xindian; Yonghe; Zhonghe	East in Keelung City: Anle; Nuannuan; Qidu; Ren'ai; Xinyi; Zhongshan; Zhongzheng; in Taipei City: Nangang; Neihu; in New Taipei City: Gongliao; Jinshan; Pingxi; Ruifang; Shuangxi; Wanli; Xizhi

== GDP ==
In 2014, the Taipei–Keelung metropolitan area's GDP per capita (PPP) was US$46,102.

== Transportation ==
=== Rail ===
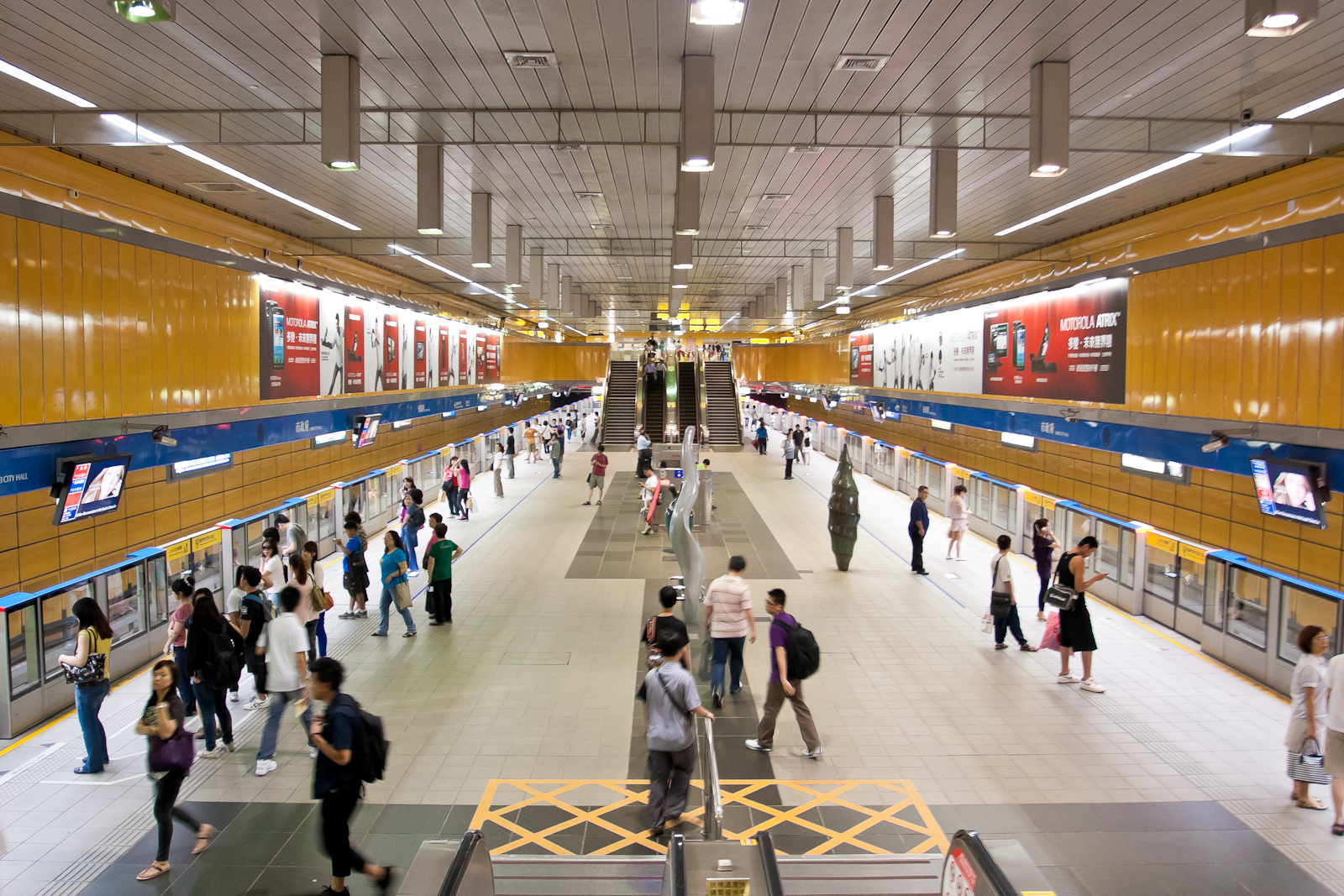
Platform of the Taipei City Hall Station on the Taipei Metro system.

The Taipei–Keelung metropolitan area is served by routes of the Taiwan Railway (Western Trunk line, Yilan line, Pingxi line, Shen'ao line) which connects it with the majority of the inhabited places on the island and the Taiwan High Speed Rail which connects the island's western coast.

=== Mass Rapid Transit ===
For rapid transit, Taipei and New Taipei are served by the Taipei Metro with daily trips of over 2 million passengers. The Danhai light rail is operated by New Taipei Metro. The Taoyuan Airport MRT connects Taipei City, New Taipei City and Taoyuan City with Taoyuan International Airport.

=== Air ===
The area is served by Taiwan Taoyuan International Airport for international flights while Songshan Airport is primarily for domestic flights, international flights to Tokyo and Seoul; and also cross-strait flights.

=== Bus ===
An extensive bus system serves the metropolitan area.

== See also ==
- Administrative divisions of Taiwan
- Geography of Taiwan
- List of metropolitan areas in Asia by population
- List of Taiwanese counties and cities by area
- List of Taiwanese counties and cities by population
- List of Taiwanese counties and cities by population density
- Political divisions of Taiwan (1895–1945)
