= 2025 Taiwan African swine fever outbreak =

Animal disease outbreak in Taiwan

Between 10 and 20 October 2025, 117 pigs at a pig farm in Wuqi District, Taichung, Taiwan died abnormally. On 22 October, the Ministry of Agriculture detected a positive nucleic acid reaction for the African swine fever virus (ASF), with the virus strain suspected to be highly similar to strains found in Vietnam. This marked the first time that African swine fever viral nucleic acid had been detected in pigs in Taiwan. The outbreak was officially confirmed on 25 October following virus isolation tests.

== Process ==
On 26 October, during its 38th meeting, the Central Disaster Response Center for African Swine Fever pointed out discrepancies regarding the number of pig deaths and records of food waste treatment at the affected pig farm in Taichung. Deputy Minister of Agriculture Tu Wen-chen stated that the records reported by the farm owner did not match those of rendering plants and that the cooking procedures for food waste did not comply with regulations.Peng Chi-ming of the Ministry of Environment explained that although the farm fed pigs with food waste, it had failed to upload daily cooking records as required and had not submitted any records in August. The Taichung City Government under Mayor Lu Shiow-yen had conducted inspections only in May and July, failing to meet regulatory requirements. Relevant information was transferred to the Ministry of Agriculture for epidemiological investigation and assessment.

On 30 October, Minister of Health and Welfare Shih Chung-liang announced that Taiwan's airports would no longer separate passengers into different inspection channels. Regardless of whether passengers arrived from African swine fever-affected regions, all luggage would be subject to inspection.

== Reactions ==
=== Ban on pig slaughter and transportation ===
Following the outbreak, the Ministry of Agriculture held a press conference and ordered a nationwide ban on the transportation and slaughter of pigs for five days beginning at noon on 22 October 2025. The feeding of pigs with food waste was completely prohibited, and frozen pork from government reserves, equivalent to one month's supply, was used to meet market demand. Pork exports were also suspended.

On 26 October, during a video conference of the African Swine Fever Disaster Response Center chaired by Cho Jung-tai, Premier of the Republic of China, it was announced that the ban on the transportation and slaughter of live pigs, originally scheduled to end that day, would be extended for another ten days until 6 November.

=== Personnel changes involving the heads of the Taichung Department of Agriculture, Department of Environmental Protection, and Animal Protection and Health Inspection Office ===
On 6 November 2025, the Taichung City Government announced the dismissal of Chang Ching-chang, Director of the Agriculture Bureau，Taichung City Government, Chen Hung-yi, Director of the Environmental Protection Bureau, Taichung City Government，and Lin Ju-liang, Director of the Animal Protection and Health Inspection Office.

However, the three officials were not actually removed from public service.[note 1] Chang applied for retirement, Chen was demoted from grade 13 to grade 12 technical supervisor, and Lin was demoted from grade 10 to grade 9 specialist in the Economic Development Bureau.

=== Strengthening border controls ===
On 6 November 2025, in order to strengthen border controls, the Ministry of Agriculture amended relevant provisions of the Act on the Prevention and Control of Infectious Animal Diseases. Under the revised regulations, both senders and recipients of mailed parcels containing pork products would be subject to penalties.

== Related incidents ==
=== Kerry TJ Logistics' non-cooperation with inspections ===
On 23 October 2025, the Kaohsiung City Government Department of Health discovered that a shipment of pork suspected of being contaminated had been transported by a business operator from Changhua County to a Kerry TJ Logistics depot in Daliao District. The operator delayed reporting the vehicle's location and falsely described the contents of the shipment, hindering food safety inspections. Consequently, the Kaohsiung City Government imposed a fine of NT$3 million on Kerry TJ Logistics Company Limited under the Act Governing Food Safety and Sanitation and referred the case to the Taiwan Kaohsiung District Prosecutors Office for investigation.

Kaohsiung Mayor Chen Chi-mai later stated at a press conference that companies attempting to evade investigations should face severe penalties.

=== Contradictory statements by the Taichung City Government ===
Regarding whether veterinarians had visited the affected pig farm, the Taichung City Government stated on 22 and 23 October that a contracted veterinarian surnamed Chi had visited the site. On 24 October, the Animal Protection and Health Inspection Office stated that another veterinarian surnamed Wang had been present. On 26 October, it changed its account, saying that Wang was actually a veterinary assistant employed by a pharmaceutical company rather than a licensed veterinarian. On 27 October, it further stated that Wang had not visited the site and had only received a phone call from the pig farmer.

Also on 27 October, authorities stated that a veterinarian surnamed Lai from the Animal Protection and Health Inspection Office had visited the farm before 14 October. On 28 October, they revised their account again, stating that Lai had been accompanied by another veterinarian surnamed Chi.

=== Suspected tampering of rendering triplicate forms ===
After pigs died, rendering facilities were required to complete triplicate forms to verify the number of dead pigs. The first copy was retained by the rendering plant, the second by local animal disease prevention authorities, and the third by the pig farmer. In this case, the triplicate forms were suspected of having been altered, resulting in discrepancies in the reported number of pig deaths.

=== Unauthorized cleaning and disinfection by the Taichung City Government ===
On 2 November, without notifying the Ministry of Agriculture and contrary to standard operating procedures, the Taichung City Government conducted cleaning and disinfection at the site, affecting the field sampling that had been scheduled for 3 November. The Taichung City Government later stated that the incident resulted from personnel at the Animal Protection and Health Inspection Office misunderstanding instructions.

=== Issues related to food waste ===
According to the Disaster Response Center's investigation, the food waste cooking equipment used by the affected pig farm had broken down in April 2025.

=== Irregularities in the "Food Waste Cooking Reporting System" ===
The affected pig farm had failed to upload data daily to the "Food Waste Cooking Reporting System" since May. Most of the photographs submitted between May and July were uploaded retroactively, and the majority of them had actually been taken in October. As a result, the Taichung District Prosecutors Office launched an investigation.

=== Failure of the Taichung City Government to conduct proper inspections ===
In response to abnormalities in the "Food Waste Cooking Reporting System", the Taichung City Government carried out inspections only once each in May, July, and October, rather than conducting monthly inspections as required by regulations, and claimed that no problems had been found during those inspections.

=== Failure of the Taichung City Government to test for African swine fever ===
When the Taichung City Government submitted samples to the Ministry of Agriculture on 20 October, it initially requested testing only for respiratory pathogens, including Actinobacillus pleuropneumoniae. Additional testing for African swine fever was conducted only after Huang Yu-liang, Associate Research Fellow at the Veterinary Research Institute of the Ministry of Agriculture, recommended it.

=== Control Yuan investigation ===
In February 2026, the Control Yuan stated that officials had failed to recognize that the number of pig deaths had exceeded warning thresholds, had submitted contradictory epidemiological investigation reports, had allowed subordinates to carry out unauthorized disinfection operations, and had attempted to evade responsibility. Consequently, former Taichung Department of Agriculture Director Chang Ching-chang, former Environmental Protection Bureau Director Chen Hung-yi, former Animal Protection and Health Inspection Office Director Lin Ju-liang, and office section chief Chou Pai-chun were impeached for violating the Civil Servant Service Act and referred to the Disciplinary Court.

=== Criminal investigation ===
In November 2025, the Taichung District Prosecutors Office ordered the detention of the father and son who operated the affected pig farm. In February 2026, the two were indicted on charges including violations of the Waste Disposal Act, forgery, and fraud under the Criminal Code of the Republic of China.
