= Shih Yi-fang =

Shih Yi-fang MLY
- 施義芳
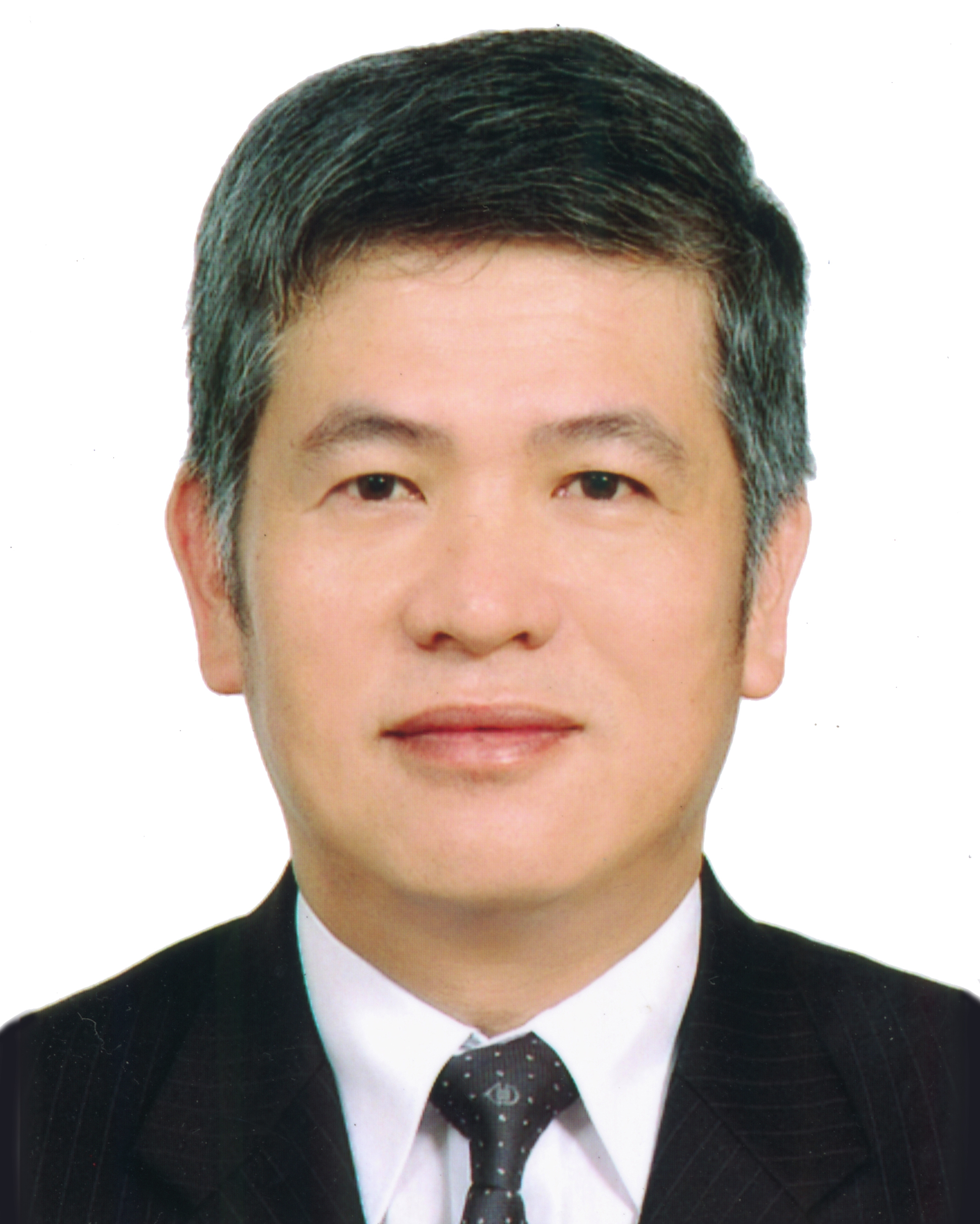
- Official portrait, 2016

Member of the Legislative Yuan
- In office 26 May 2016 – 31 January 2020
- Preceded by: Lee Ying-yuan
- Constituency: Party-list

Personal details
- Born: 10 February 1962 (age 64) Changhua County, Taiwan
- Party: Democratic Progressive Party
- Education: National Taiwan University of Science and Technology (BS); National Central University (MS)
- Profession: Engineer

Shih Yi-fang (Chinese: 施義芳; born 10 February 1962) is a Taiwanese engineer and politician who had served as the member of the Legislative Yuan from 2016 to 2020.

== Education and early career ==
He earned a Bachelor of Science (B.S.) at National Taiwan University of Science and Technology, and obtained his Master of Science (M.S.) in civil engineering from National Central University. Shih has served as spokesman for a collective of civil engineering professional associations and represented the Farglory Group.

== Political career ==
Shih was placed on the Democratic Progressive Party's party list for the first time in 2008, and was defeated. He again represented the DPP as a proportional representation candidate in 2012, and lost for a second time. Shih ran for an at-large seat in 2016. Though he lost, Shih was selected to replace Lee Ying-yuan when Lee took office as minister of the Environmental Protection Administration. Shih was sworn in as a member of the Ninth Legislative Yuan on 26 May 2016. He was listed on the Democratic Progressive party list again in 2020, but lost reelection. Shih represented Taiwan at the 2023 World Engineers Convention.
