= Chen Tung-jung =

Taiwanese politician

Chen Tung-jung (Chinese: 陳東榮) is a Taiwanese politician.

Chen attended the Taipei University of Marine Technology.

He moved to the United States, and became active in the Taiwanese American Association, serving as president of the Southern California branch and vice president at the national level. Chen was also an adviser and secretary-general of the World Federation of Taiwanese Associations. Chen took office as a member of the Legislative Yuan on 11 June 2007, following Winston Dang's appointment as head of the Environmental Protection Administration. Chen's legislative tenure ended following the 2008 legislative election.
