= Shotgun start =

Golf tournament format

A shotgun start is a golf tournament format in which all groups of players tee off simultaneously from different holes. Each hole on a course will be the starting hole for one or more foursomes. Group 1 would start from hole 1, group 2 from hole 2, etc. Each group starts play at the same time. A shotgun start allows a tournament to end at the same time it takes the slowest foursome to finish a full round or 18 holes of golf. If there are more than 18 teams involved, some double up at the 4 and 5 par holes as A & B teams

The December 2004 issue of Golf Digest reported that in May 1956, Jim Russell, the head pro at Walla Walla Country Club in Walla Walla, Washington, fired a shotgun to sound the start of play. This is purportedly the first time a tournament used such a starting format. Today, a central siren, loudspeaker or horn is used so that golfers all over the course can hear the signal to start, or a specific time is designated.

This starting format is popular for charity events, as everyone starts and finishes at the same time. This allows for a post-event meal where the prizes can be awarded. It can also be used for large group and corporate tournaments as well as events where the participants arrive at the venue together on a bus.

Most golf courses have strict rules and policies when booking this type of tournament (as the number of players involved essentially closes the course to other golfers), which may include one or more of the following:

- There must be a minimum number of players. If this minimum cannot be met, the course may revert the tournament to a first tee or split tee start.
- Deposits for this type of event may be higher than normal first tee starts. Cancellation notices may also have to be presented further in advance.
- These events may be restricted to being held on weekdays or specific days of the week. Most courses do not allow this type of event on weekends.
- A surcharge may apply to quoted rates.
- Starting times are usually restricted to either 8 a.m. or 1 p.m. at most courses.
- The club usually requires the tournament to have a post-event meal at the clubhouse.
- The club may require a minimum prize purchase from the club pro shop.
- The course may require the tournament carry weather insurance.
- The course may require mandatory carts for all participants, even if the host organization traditionally prohibits carts at their events.
- Some clubs subject these tournaments to membership approval.

== European Tour ==
Because of weather issues, the European Tour of professional golf has used the format three times to play ahead of the weather; the final round of the 1994 Czech Open, the final two rounds of the 2015 Portugal Masters and the final round of 2018 Alfred Dunhill Links Championship all used shotgun starts in order to beat the weather. The lead group teed off at the first hole, with groups going by order, with the first golfers on the 18th, then the second group on the 17th, and so forth. There were two groups at some holes, with six of the 18 holes featuring two groups. In those cases, the second group teed off five minutes after the first group.
