= 中央大學 =

中央大學 or 中央大学 may refer to:

- Chung-Ang University
- Chuo University
- National Central University
