= Shieu Fuh-sheng =

Taiwanese engineer and materials scientist (born 1959)

- 薛富盛
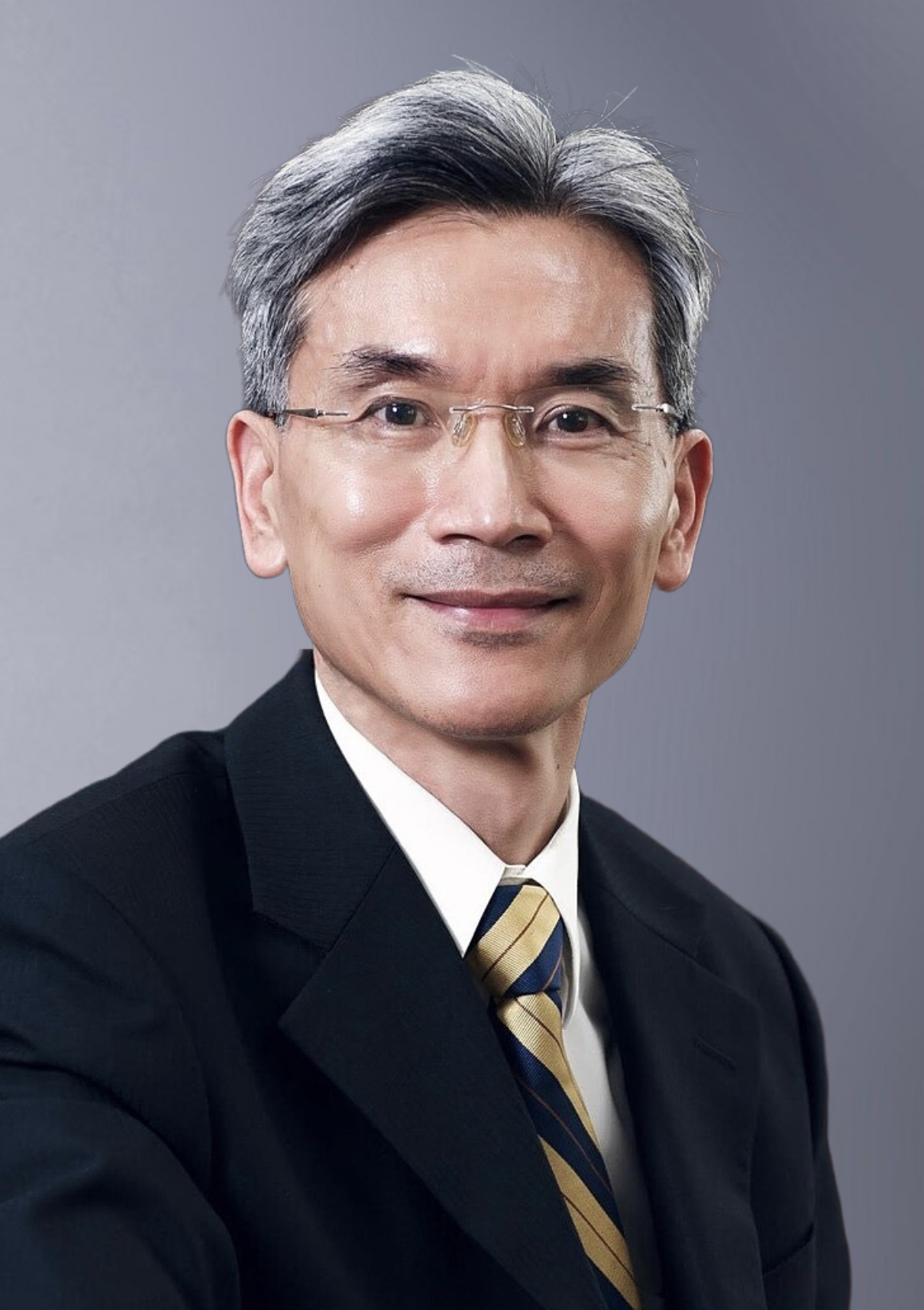
- Official portrait, 2023

1st Minister of Environment
- In office 22 August 2023 – 20 May 2024
- Prime Minister: Chen Chien-jen
- Preceded by: Ministry established (Note: Chang Tzi-chin as Minister of Environmental Protection Administration)
- Succeeded by: Peng Chi-ming

President of National Chung Hsing University
- In office 1 August 2015 – 31 July 2023
- Preceded by: Der-Tsai Lee
- Succeeded by: Chan Chih-fu

Personal details
- Born: 22 August 1959 (age 66) Penghu County, Taiwan
- Education: National Tsing Hua University (BS); Cornell University (MS, PhD)
- Scientific career
- Fields: Materials science
- Thesis: Tailoring the structure and mechanical properties of metal-ceramic interfaces (1990)
- Doctoral advisor: Stephen L. Sass

Shieu Fuh-sheng (Chinese: 薛富盛; Wade–Giles: Hsueh^{1} Fu^{4}-sheng^{4}; born 22 August 1959) is a Taiwanese engineer and materials scientist who served as the Minister of Environment of Taiwan from 22 August 2023 to 20 May 2024.

== Early life and education ==
Shieu was born in Magong City, Penghu. After graduating from National Magong Senior High School, he studied materials science and engineering at National Tsing Hua University and graduated with a Bachelor of Science (B.S.) in 1981 ranked first in his class. Upon completing military service in the Republic of China Marine Corps in May 1983, Shieu was employed by the China Steel Corporation as a chief engineer of its department of metallurgical technology.

In 1985, Shieu moved to the United States to complete graduate studies at Cornell University, where he earned a Master of Science (M.S.) and his Ph.D. in materials science and engineering in 1990 under the supervision of professor Stephen L. Sass. His doctoral dissertation was titled, "Tailoring the structure and mechanical properties of metal-ceramic interfaces." He then worked for the Dow Chemical Company in Michigan for three years before returning to Taiwan.

== Academic career ==
Shieu began teaching at National Chung Hsing University in 1993, and successively led the College of Engineering and Office of Research and Development at NCHU prior to replacing Der-Tsai Lee as university president. Shieu assumed the NCHU presidency on 1 August 2015. During his presidential tenure, the university started a breakfast program to entice its students to awaken earlier, and established the first Academy of Circular Economy in Taiwan. Shieu is the founding leader of the National University System of Taiwan.

== Political career ==
Shieu was named the head of the Ministry of Environment in July 2023. He took office on 22 August 2023. In April 2024, Shieu confirmed that he would step down from his governmental position after the incoming William Lai administration had taken office.

== Honors ==
Shieu is a fellow of the Institution of Engineering and Technology, the Institute of Materials, Minerals and Mining, and the Australian Institution of Energy.

== Personal life ==
Fuh-Sheng Shieu is married to Chi Mei-lih.
