= Yeh Shin-cheng =

Taiwanese politician

- 葉欣誠

Minister without Portfolio of the Executive Yuan
- In office 8 December 2014 – 19 May 2016

Deputy Minister of Environmental Protection Administration of the Republic of China
- In office 20 February 2012 – 2014
- Minister: Stephen Shen

Personal details
- Born: 1965 (age 60–61) Keelung, Taiwan
- Education: National Taiwan University (BS, MS); Cornell University (PhD)

Yeh Shin-cheng (Chinese: 葉欣誠; pinyin: Yè Xīnchéng; born 1965) is a Taiwanese environmental engineer. He served as Minister without Portfolio of the Executive Yuan from 2014 to 2016. He was Deputy Minister of the Environmental Protection Administration from 2012 to 2014.

== Early life and education ==
Yeh was born in Keelung in 1965. He was raised in Keelung and Zhongli, Taoyuan. After graduating from Taipei Municipal Chien Kuo High School in 1983, he attended National Taiwan University (NTU), where he became the president of the university's students' union and graduated with a Bachelor of Science (B.S.) in civil engineering in 1987. He then completed military service in the Republic of China Army as a second lieutenant in the Republic of China Military Police, and afterwards returned to NTU and earned a Master of Science (M.S.) in environmental engineering in 1992.

After receiving his master's degree, Yeh pursued doctoral studies in the United States, earning his Ph.D. in hydraulic engineering and environmental engineering from Cornell University in 1996. His doctoral dissertation, completed under professor Daniel P. Loucks, was titled, "Grey programming and its applications to water resources management".

== Early career ==
Yeh served as a postdoctoral research fellow at the Graduate Institute of Environmental Engineering of NTU in 1996-1997 and adjunct assistant professor in the same department in 1997–1998. Afterwards, he became an assistant professor of the Department of Civil Engineering at National Chi Nan University. In 2001–2006, he was an associate professor at the Graduate Institute of Environmental Education of National Kaohsiung Normal University, and was promoted to professor and director in 2006–2009. In 2009–2012, he was a professor of the Graduate Institute of Environmental Education of National Taiwan Normal University, where he was also promoted to be director in 2010.
