= Lee Ying-yuan =

Taiwanese health economist and politician (1953–2021)

Lee Ying-yuan MLY
- 李應元
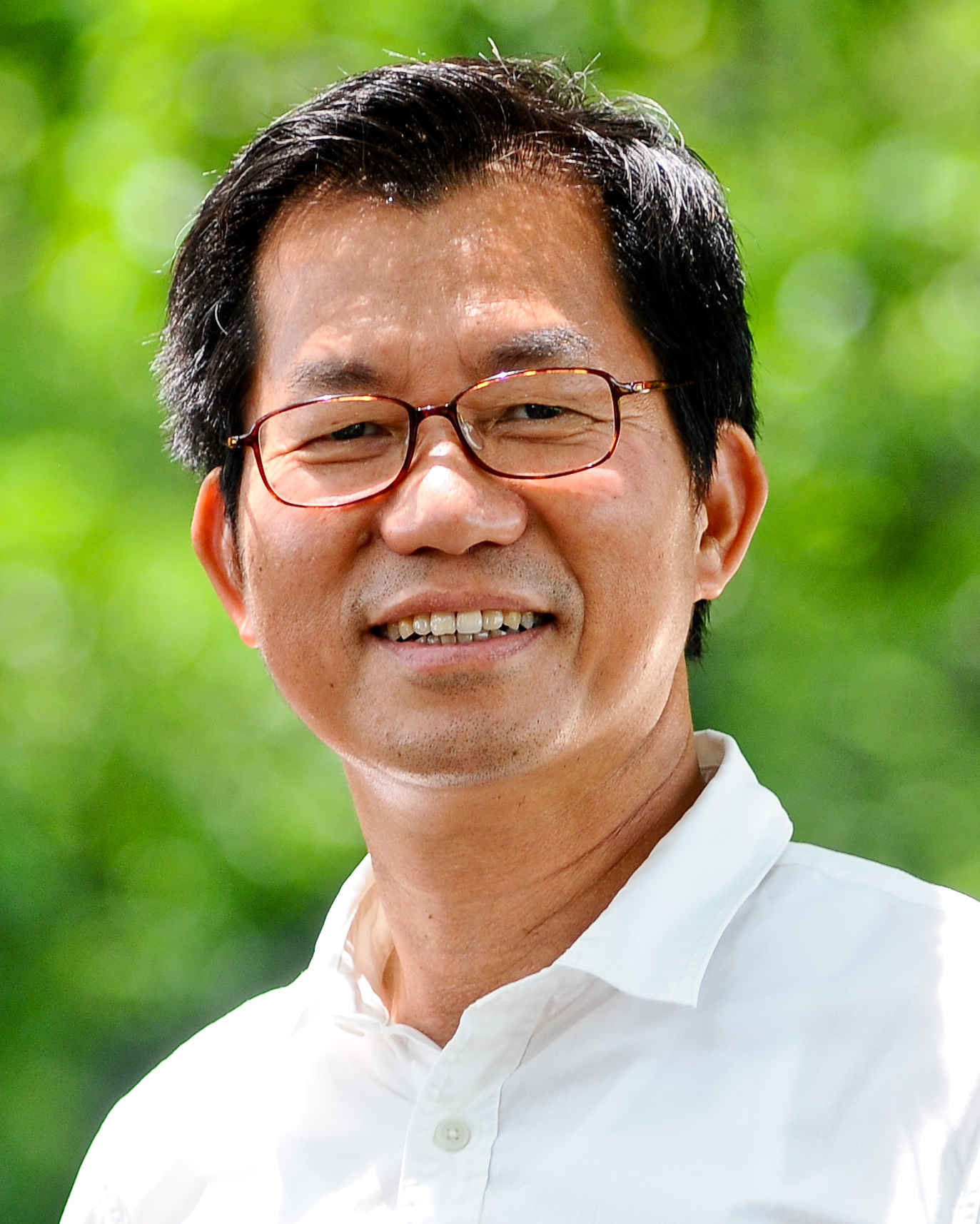
- Lee in 2013

Representative of Taiwan to Thailand
- In office 13 August 2020 – 31 August 2021
- President: Tsai Ing-wen
- MOFA Minister: Joseph Wu
- Preceded by: Tung Chen-yuan
- Succeeded by: Chuang Suo-hang

12th Minister of Environmental Protection Administration
- In office 20 May 2016 – 1 December 2018
- Prime Minister: Lin Chuan; William Lai
- Deputy: See list: Chang Tzi-chin Thomas Chan
- Preceded by: Wei Kuo-yen
- Succeeded by: Tsai Hung-teh (acting); Chang Tzi-chin

Member of the Legislative Yuan
- In office 1 February 2012 – 20 May 2016
- Succeeded by: Shih Yi-fang
- Constituency: Party-list
- In office 1 February 1996 – August 2000
- Constituency: Taipei County

11th Secretary-General of the Democratic Progressive Party
- In office 15 January 2008 – 15 May 2008
- Chairman: Chen Shui-bian
- Preceded by: Cho Jung-tai
- Succeeded by: Wang Tuoh

7th Minister of the Council of Labor Affairs
- In office 19 September 2005 – 20 May 2007
- Prime Minister: Frank Hsieh; Su Tseng-chang
- Preceded by: Chen Chu
- Succeeded by: Lu Tien-ling

21st and 24th Secretary-General of the Executive Yuan
- In office 1 February 2005 – 19 September 2005
- Prime Minister: Frank Hsieh
- Preceded by: Arthur Iap
- Succeeded by: Cho Jung-tai
- In office 1 February 2002 – 1 July 2002
- Prime Minister: Yu Shyi-kun
- Preceded by: Chiou I-jen
- Succeeded by: Liu Shyh-fang

Deputy Representative of Taiwan to the United States
- In office September 2000 – 21 January 2002 Serving with Shen Lyu-shun
- Representative: See list: Stephen S.F. Chen Chen Chien-jen
- Succeeded by: Michael Tsai
Magisterial offices
Acting Magistrate of Yunlin
In office 5 November 2008 – 17 November 2008
Preceded by	Su Chih-fen
Succeeded by	Su Chih-fen
Deputy Magistrate of Yunlin
In office July 2008 – July 2009
Magistrate	See list: Su Chih-fen Himself (acting) Su Chih-fen
Succeeded by

Personal details
- Born: March 16, 1953 Yunlin County, Taiwan
- Died: November 11, 2021 (aged 68) Zhongzheng, Taipei, Taiwan
- Party: Democratic Progressive Party
- Spouse: Huang Yue-kui
- Education: National Taiwan University (BS, MS); Harvard University (MPH); University of North Carolina at Chapel Hill (PhD)

Lee Ying-yuan (Chinese: 李應元; pinyin: Lǐ Yìngyuán; Wade–Giles: Li^{3} Ying^{4}-yüen^{2}; Pe̍h-ōe-jī: Lí Èng-goân; 16 March 1953 – 11 November 2021) was a Taiwanese health economist and politician. He was elected to the Legislative Yuan in 1995 and stepped down in 2000. In 2005, Lee was appointed the Minister of Council of Labor Affairs, which he led until 2007. Lee has also served as Secretary-General of the Executive Yuan and the Democratic Progressive Party, and was reelected to the Legislative Yuan in 2012. He was appointed the Minister of Environmental Protection Administration (EPA) in 2016. He left the EPA in 2018, and subsequently served as Taiwan's representative to Thailand from 2020 to 2021.

== Early life and education ==
Lee Ying-yuan was born into a Hakka family of farmers in Yunlin County in 1953. His ancestral home is in Zhao'an County, Fujian. After graduating from Taichung Municipal Taichung First Senior High School, he studied public health at National Taiwan University, where he graduated with a Bachelor of Science (B.S.) ranked second in his class and completed a Master of Science (M.S.) in public health in 1980 while working as a medical news reporter for the Taiwan Times. Yuan then pursued graduate studies in the United States at Harvard University and earned a Master of Public Health (M.P.H.) specializing in health policy and management from the Harvard T.H. Chan School of Public Health in 1981.

In 1988, Lee earned his Ph.D. in health economics from the University of North Carolina at Chapel Hill. His doctoral dissertation, completed under professor Deborah Freund, was titled, "The Supply of Physicians and their Incomes."

== Career ==
Upon Lee's graduation, he was slated to teach at NTU, but was placed on a blacklist and barred from returning to Taiwan by the Kuomintang-led government, stemming from his pro-democracy activities in the Formosa Incident during Taiwan's martial law period. During Lee's time as a student in the United States, he was also an active member of the World United Formosans for Independence, which attracted more of the KMT's attention.

=== Return to Taiwan ===
After returning to Taiwan through illegal channels and avoiding intelligence agents for fourteen months, Lee was arrested in September 1991, and charged with violation of Article 100 of the Criminal Code. He was released in May 1992, after would-be colleagues at National Taiwan University intervened on his behalf. Revisions to Article 100 were also passed that month, and meant that evidence of possible threats had to be submitted to the Commission of Violence prior to indictment or arrest.

== Political career ==
Lee was elected to the Legislative Yuan in 1995. He then became the youngest convener of the Democratic Progressive Party (DPP) caucus in the legislature. Following DPP’s successful presidential election in 2000, Lee was appointed by President Chen Shui-bian to be the Deputy Representative of the Taipei Economic and Cultural Representative Office (TECRO) in the U.S. and then Secretary-General of the Executive Yuan. He was then named the DPP candidate for Taipei City's 2002 mayoral election, losing to incumbent mayor Ma Ying-jeou in a landslide.

2002 Taipei City mayoral election result
Party	#	Candidate	Votes	Percentage
Democratic Progressive Party	1	Lee Ying-yuan	488,811	35.89%
Kuomintang	2	Ma Ying-jeou	873,102	64.11%
Total			1,374,862	100.00%
Voter turnout			70.61%	

He was named the head of the Council of Labor Affairs in 2005, and stayed on in the Su Tseng-chang cabinet. Under his leadership, the CLA sought to decrease the number of job-related deaths and injuries causing disabilities. In 2008, Lee was named the Secretary-General of the Democratic Progressive Party and deputy Yunlin County magistrate under Su Chih-fen. He resigned the deputy magistracy to run in a legislative-by election caused by the annulment of Chang Sho-wen's election. However, Lee lost a primary to Liu Chien-kuo. He was re-elected to the Legislative Yuan in 2012.

During the summer of 2015, Lee accompanied DPP chairperson and presidential nominee Tsai Ing-wen on her visit to the United States, along with DPP General Secretary Joseph Wu. Lee was named Tsai's Environmental Protection Administration minister after she won the 2016 election. He stated that his goal was to transform the EPA into a full-fledged ministry within 18 months of taking office. On 1 December 2018, Lee stepped down from the EPA.

In June 2020, Lee was appointed representative of Taiwan to Thailand, succeeding Tung Chen-yuan, and formally took office on 13 August 2020. Lee's resignation from the position was approved on 4 August 2021, and took effect on 1 September 2021.

== Personal life ==
Lee was married to Laura Huang (黃月桂).

== Death ==
Lee died of pancreatic cancer on 11 November 2021, at the age of 68 in National Taiwan University Hospital.
