= Peng Chi-ming =

Taiwanese politician and meteorologist (born 1970)

- 彭啓明
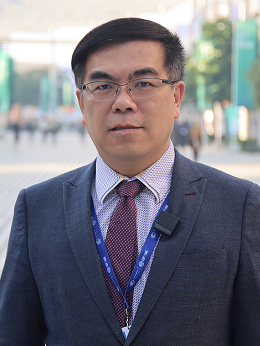
- Peng in 2024

2nd Minister of Environment
- Incumbent
- Assumed office 20 May 2024
- Prime Minister: Cho Jung-tai
- Preceded by: Shieu Fuh-sheng

Personal details
- Born: 27 May 1970 (age 56) Taoyuan, Taiwan
- Education: National Central University (BS, MS, PhD)
- Scientific career
- Fields: Atmospheric science
- Thesis: A study of stratiform clouds in northern Taiwan: Chemical and microphysical properties and their applications in regional air pollution and climate change (1999)

Peng Chi-ming (Chinese: 彭啓明; Wade–Giles: Peng^{2} Chi^{3}-ming^{2}; born 27 May 1970) is a Taiwanese meteorologist who is currently serving as Minister of Environment.

After earning his doctorate in atmospheric science from National Central University, he founded Taiwan's first weather service company in 2003 and is credited with drafting the country's first weather insurance policy.

== Early life and education ==
Peng was born in Guanyin, Taoyuan, to a Hakka Chinese family. He moved around frequently due to his father's job. He graduated from Cheng Kung Senior High School in Taipei.

From 1988 to 1999, Peng attended National Central University (NCU), earning a Bachelor of Science (B.S.), a Master of Science (M.S.), and a Ph.D., all in atmospheric science. His doctoral dissertation was titled, "A study of stratiform clouds in northern Taiwan: Chemical and microphysical properties and their applications in regional air pollution and climate change" (北台灣冬季層狀雲之研究:化學與微物理特性及其在區域大氣污染與區域氣候變化之應用). In 2011, he was named an outstanding alumnus of NCU.

== Early career ==
In 2003, Peng founded the company WeatherRisk Explore and served as its general manager. The company was Taiwan's first weather company. Peng's work earned him the nickname, "Weatherman Supreme".

Peng also advocated for weather insurance as a product, serving as weather advisor for Central Insurance (中央產物保險). He is credited with drafting Taiwan's first weather insurance policy, which was approved by the Ministry of Finance in 2004. The rainfall policy was written for whale watching tour operators in Yilan and was also later sold to Taiwan's professional baseball league for the grand final being held in Kaohsiung.

In 2015, Peng worked with Australian company Weatherzone to create a lightning alert service provider Shandian. Instead of using the lightning detection system provided by Taiwan's Central Weather Bureau or Taipower, Shandian built its own technology with American company Earth Networks to provide faster data and redundancy.

As general manager of WeatherRisk, Peng served in an expert capacity and attended international conferences such as World Meteorological Organization (WMO) as a civic observer. In 2019, after attending a WMO meeting in Geneva earlier in the week, Peng's accreditation was abruptly canceled, and he was blocked from joining the World Meteorological Congress, reportedly due to Chinese pressure.

Peng operated a popular Facebook page about weather forecasts. Prior to his appointment as Minister of Environment in 2024, Peng had attended 11 United Nations Climate Change Conferences as an observer.

== Minister of Environment ==
In 2024, Peng was invited by premier Cho Jung-tai to serve as the Minister of Environment, succeeding Shieu Fuh-sheng. Following the nomination, Peng announced that he would resign from his role as general manager of WeatherRisk as well as his teaching roles.

Under Peng's leadership at the Ministry of Environment, Taiwan sought to position itself as an important part of global climate governance. In a statement, Peng outlined plans to adopt a comprehensive strategy that includes a carbon pricing system and major development funds for green industries, including a NT$10 billion (US$308 million) Green Growth Fund.

Peng announced the planned launch of Taiwan's cap and trade system over the next four years in October 2024, which would follow the Japanese model. The system would start with a pilot program for companies that already had a track record of decarbonization.

Peng expressed regret over Taiwan's exclusion from COP29, stating it is the world's loss. The ministry set up a "war room" to observe the climate summit via live streams. Despite not being able to participate in the conference, Taiwan committed to a more stringent carbon cutting target for 2030, after a law was passed committing the Taiwanese government to reach net-zero carbon emissions by 2050.

In February 2025, Peng stated in a Reuters interview that the government was aiming to get over US$1.5 billion from insurance funds to help finance green energy projects. He said that Taiwan faced "worse heat waves, stronger typhoons and more intense droughts," which would require the government to confront climate change.

Peng Chi-ming has spearheaded climate governance initiatives that combine Taiwan's high-tech sector with international outreach and urban climate adaptation. Peng inspected Kaohsiung's toxic substance response training center to evaluate AI-enabled disaster prevention and rolled out a national urban canopy plan using nature-based cooling corridors to protect vulnerable groups. The project treats trees as critical climate infrastructure and introduces a digital platform allowing citizens to adopt and track street trees.

== Personal life ==
Peng is a vegetarian and advocates using plant-based diets as a way to mitigate global warming.
