= Taipei University of Marine Technology =

Private university in New Taipei, Taiwan

Coordinates: 25.1915°N 121.4272°E

- 台北海洋科技大學
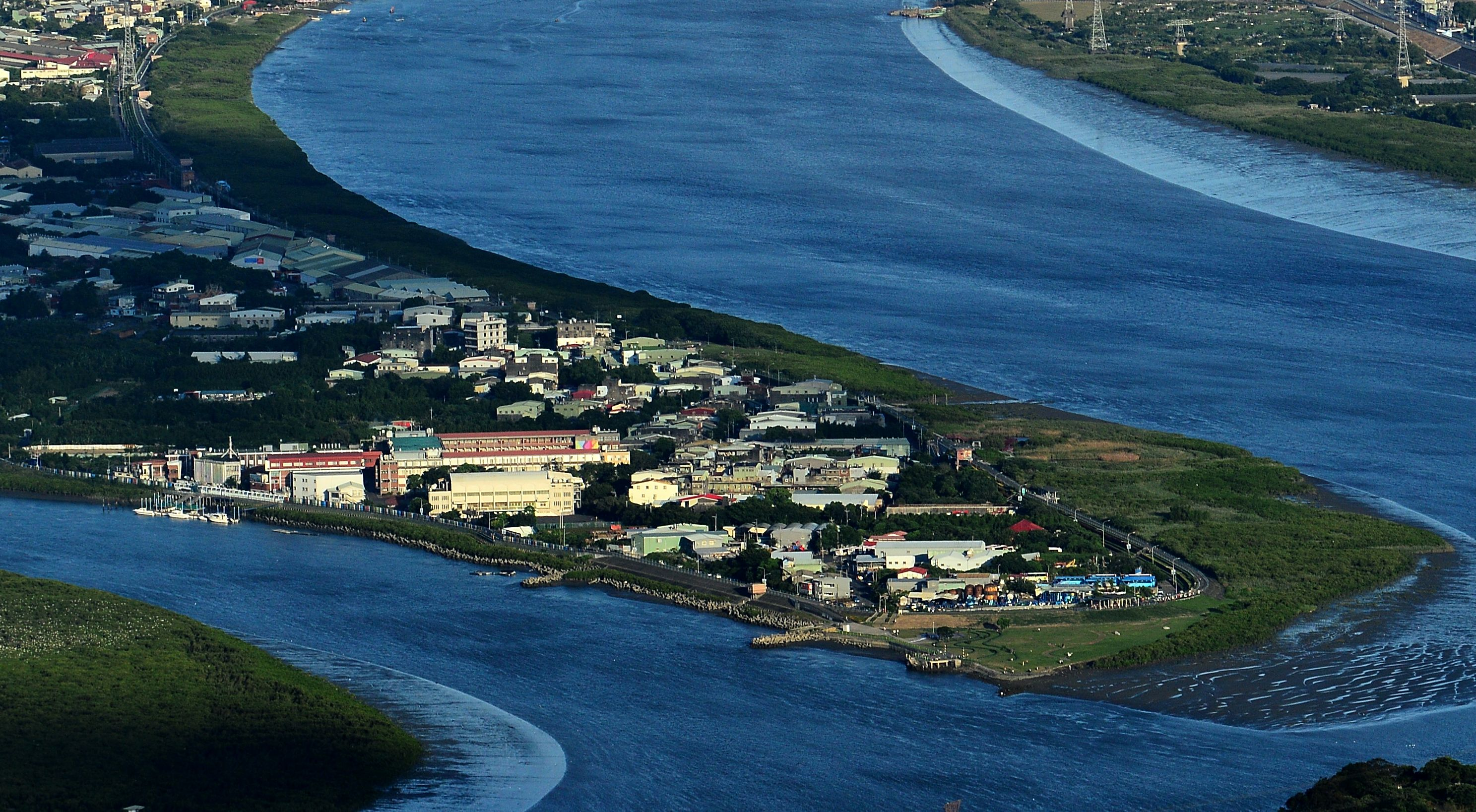
- Former names: China Maritime College; Taipei Maritime Technical College
- Established: 1965
- Location: Shilin District, Taipei; Tamsui District, New Taipei, Taiwan
- Website: www.tumt.edu.tw

Taipei University of Marine Technology
- Traditional Chinese: 台北海洋科技大學
Transcriptions
Standard Mandarin
- Hanyu Pinyin: Táiběi Hǎiyáng Kējì Dàxué
Southern Min
- Hokkien POJ: Tâi-pak Hái-iûⁿ Kho-ki Tāi-ha̍k

Taipei University of Marine Technology (TUMT; Chinese: 台北海洋科技大學; Pe̍h-ōe-jī: Tâi-pak Hái-iûⁿ Kho-ki Tāi-ha̍k) is a private technological university located in Taiwan.

== History ==
Taipei University of Marine Technology remains the only private university that owns its wharf for the purpose of teaching. And the university is the only one in Taiwan that has campuses across the City of Taipei and the New Taipei city geographically. The university has educated more than 40,000 students since 1966.

Taipei University of Marine Technology is a vocational technology-oriented institute aiming to cultivate technical professionals in maritime and commerce. The university adopted “Justice, Honesty, Diligence, Courage, Persistency” as the university motto, “Professionalism, Loyalty, Diligence, Persistency, Servicing as the university philosophy, and the vision of cultivating distinguished professionals emphasizing the balance of theory and practice, both technology and ethics, reality, innovation, servicing, and LOHAS (lifestyles of health and sustainability).

== Campus ==
TUMT has two campuses: one in Shilin District, Taipei, and the other in Tamsui District, New Taipei.

== Faculties ==
- College of Maritime (2 Master Programs included)
- College of LOHAS
- College of Innovation

== Notable alumni ==
- Terry Gou, billionaire CEO of Foxconn
- Chen Tung-jung, politician
- Dylan Kuo, actor

== See also ==
- List of universities in Taiwan
