= World Federation of Taiwanese Associations =

The World Federation of Taiwanese Associations (WFTA) (Chinese: 世界台灣同鄉會聯合會; pinyin: Shìjiè táiwān tóngxiāng huì liánhé huì) is pro-democracy alliance of Taiwanese Associations from the U.S., Canada, Europe, Japan, Australia, New Zealand and South America. The association meets annually for conferences.

== History ==
Officially established on September 7, 1974, in Vienna, Austria, WFTA's founding member states are the United States (43 chapters), Canada (15 chapters), Europe (10 chapters), Japan, and Brazil. Canada established membership in 1964, the United States in 1970, Europe in 1971, and Japan in 1973. In 1974 the association became a Taiwanese social organization. It has added South Africa, Australia, New Zealand, Costa Rica, Argentina, the Philippines, Ecuador, and Paraguay as members in subsequent years of operation. The founding of the WFTA was motivated by two factors: an influx of overseas students and immigrants since the 1950s the evolution of the political status of Taiwan since the 1970s, leading to formation of local Taiwanese organizations and grassroots associations.

== Political Involvement ==
Chen Shui-bian gave the opening address at the 29th Annual Meeting of the World Federation of Taiwanese Associations, praising the association's dedication to democratic governance and Taiwan's autonomy. At the WFTA's meeting Chen declared Taiwan's independence and called for the attending members to consider a referendum led by the Taiwanese public.

When the Formosa Alliance called for a referendum on Taiwanese independence by the Taiwanese public on April 6, 2018, the WFTA's European branch alongside the All Japan Taiwanese Union, the Taiwanese Canadian Association of Toronto, and Taiwanese Association of America supported the cause.

The WTFA jointly published an ad on May 20, 2020, in the Washington Times alongside the North American Taiwanese Medical Association (NATMA), North America Taiwanese Professors' Association, North America Taiwanese Women's Association, and the Formosan Association for Public Affairs, and other Taiwanese overseas organizations congratulating President Tsai Ing-wen for her inauguration and calling for the diplomatic recognition of Taiwan by the United States.

46 Taiwanese associations issued a joint statement on April 15, 2020, urging the removal of "Republic of China" from the English portion of the Taiwanese passport. Amongst the associations in support of the statement was the World Federation of Taiwanese Associations.

== Leadership ==
In 1990, Canadian citizen, Yih-Sheh Leo, was the secretary of the WFTA. Leo was arrested on November 28, 1989, for illegal entry and sedition charges and was declared a "prisoner of conscience" by Amnesty International. The charges were acquitted by the High Court of Taiwan in 1990.

Chen Tan-sun was the chairman for the World Federation of Taiwanese Associations prior to replacing Eugene Chien as the foreign minister of Taiwan in 2004.

Winston Dang was the secretary general of the WFTA in 2006 when selected to serve as the director of the Department of International Affairs of the Democratic Progressive Party.

== Annual Conferences ==
The 29th Annual Meeting of the WFTA was held in August 2002 in Tokyo, Japan.

The 44th Annual Meeting of the WFTA was held from March 21 to April 4, 2017, on the Holland America Cruise Ship.

The 45th Annual Meeting of the WFTA was held September 29–30, 2018, at the Grand Prince Hotel in Tokyo, Japan.

The 46th Annual Meeting of the WFTA was held from September 14–15, 2019, at the Hilton Mainz (Riverside) in Mainz, Germany. This meeting's theme was "Building dreams and sustaining Taiwan."

The 47th Annual Meeting of the WFTA was held from January 3–9, 2020, at the Hock Wah International House of Culture in Taipei, Taiwan. This meeting's theme was "Unity against China, protect Taiwan."

== See also ==
- Taiwanese Association of America (in Chinese)
- European Federation of Taiwanese Associations
