= European Federation of Taiwanese Associations =

The European Federation of Taiwanese Associations (EFTA; Chinese: 歐洲台灣協會聯合會; pinyin: Ōuzhōu Táiwān Xiéhuì Liánhéhuì, short: Chinese: 歐台會; pinyin: Ōutáihuì) is a federation, which combines several associations by Taiwanese people in each European country. The object is to promote friendship among those European associations, support mutual corporation and continuing care for Taiwan's development and trends. At present, the director general of EFTA is HSIEH Wei-qun (謝偉群), who lives in Germany.

== Annual meetings ==
th Meeting	Year	Period	Place
39	2009	August 21 – August 23	Austria, Vienna – Austria Trend Eventhotel Pyramide
38	2008	October 3 – October 5	Germany, Offenbach am Main/Frankfurt
37	2007	July 20 – July 22	Italy, Fiuggi – Silva Hotel Splendid
36	2006	July 21 – July 23	Belgium

== Publications ==
EFTA publishes statements in irregular intervals about recent issues, which are consulted in political debates. This year on 11 July EFTA released a response to ROC on Taiwan's former president Chen Shuibian illegal imprisonment.

== See also ==
- World Federation of Taiwanese Associations
