= Chang Tzi-chin =

Taiwanese politician

- 張子敬
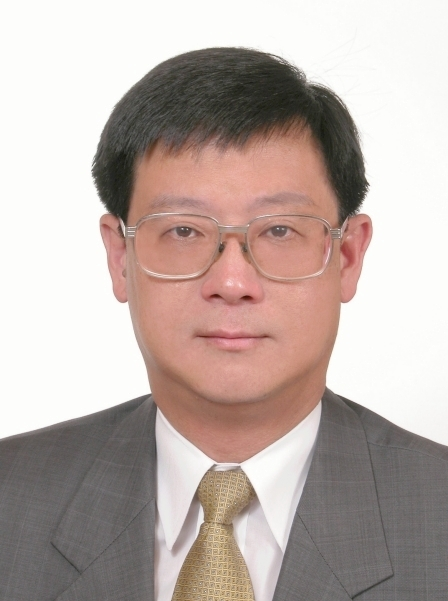

Minister without Portfolio of the Executive Yuan
- In office 22 August 2023 – 20 May 2024
- Prime Minister: Chen Chien-jen

Minister of Environmental Protection Administration
- In office 14 January 2019 – 21 August 2023
- Prime Minister: Su Tseng-chang; Chen Chien-jen
- Deputy: Tsai Hung-teh
- Preceded by: Lee Ying-yuan; Tsai Hung-teh (acting)

Deputy Minister of Environmental Protection Administration
- In office January 2006 – January 2019
- Minister: Stephen Shen; Wei Kuo-yen; Lee Ying-yuan

Deputy Magistrate of Taipei County
- In office March 2005 – January 2006
- Magistrate: Chou Hsi-wei

Personal details
- Party: Independent
- Education: National Cheng Kung University (BS); National Chiao Tung University (MS)

Chang Tzi-chin (Chinese: 張子敬; pinyin: Zhāng Zǐjìng) is a Taiwanese politician. He served as the Minister of the Environmental Protection Administration from 14 January 2019 to 21 August 2023.

== Education ==
Chang earned his bachelor's degree in environmental engineering from National Cheng Kung University in 1980 and his master's degree in the same field from National Chiao Tung University in 1995.

== Political career ==
Chang served as an associate technical specialist of the Department of Environmental Protection of Taipei City Government in 1982–1987. In 1987–1996, he became the Section Chief of the Environmental Protection Administration. He served as the section chief of the Environmental Protection Department of Taiwan Provincial Government in 1996–1997, as the director of the Northern Region Environmental Protection Center in 1997-1999 and as the executive officer of the Secretariat in 1999–2000. In 2000–2005, he became the director-general of the Environmental Protection Bureau of the Taipei County Government and in 2005-2006 as Deputy Commissioner.
