= Hwawei Ko =

- 柯華葳
- Born: 8 November 1952
- Died: 18 November 2020 (aged 68)
- Occupation: Pedagogue

Academic background
- Education: National Chengchi University (BEd); University of Wisconsin (MS); University of Washington (PhD)

Academic work
- Discipline: Pedagogy
- Institutions: National Chengchi University; National Chung Cheng University; University of Pittsburgh

Hwawei Ko (Chinese: 柯華葳; 8 November 1952 – 18/19 November 2020) was a Taiwanese pedagogue and professor who specialised in the promotion of reading education in Taiwan. She was the first director of the Learning and Teaching Institute of the Faculty of Letters at the National Central University and was professor of both the Department of Psychology of the National Chengchi University and at the National Chung Cheng University's Department of Psychology. Ko was a visiting scholar of the Harvard Institute for Educational Management and the Learning Research and Development Center at the University of Pittsburgh.

== Biography ==
Ko was born on 8 November 1952, and she was brought up a Christian. She had one younger brother. Ko was a graduate of the National Chengchi University's Department of Education with a Bachelor of Education degree, the University of Wisconsin with a Master of Educational Psychology degree and the University of Washington with a Doctor of Educational Psychology degree. In 2001, she was appointed the first director of the Learning and Teaching Institute of the Faculty of Letters at the National Central University. Ko would also be the director of the Teacher Training Center, then director of the General Teaching Center and the director of the Publishing Center.

She was also director of the National School Teachers' Seminar in the Taiwan Province, was professor of the Department of Psychology of the National Chengchi University, and served as a professor of the National Chung Cheng University's Department of Psychology. Ko was seconded to become the dean of the National Institute of Education on 1 April 2013. She was a visiting scholar at the Harvard Institute for Educational Management and a visiting scholar of the Learning Research and Development Center at the University of Pittsburgh. Ko retired from the National Central University on 1 February 2018 and she became an honorary professor at the Institute of Learning and Teaching. She was the convener of the Humanities Division at the Ministry of Science and Technology's Education Department.

She specialised in applying latent semantic analysis to computerised abstract writing learning assessment development, learning Chinese as a second language via digital platforms and the reading comprehension process of dyslexic children. Ko promoted brain and mind research by bringing in precision instruments including eye trackers for research purposes at Chiayi's rural elementary schools to observe the eye movement of students who were reading to know about the problems disadvantaged students had while reading. When she was dean of national education, she worked with the Ministry of Education to promote reading during the morning in both primary and secondary educational institutions and promoted reading habits. At the time of Ko's death, she had two unfinished books.

== Personal life ==
She had the nickname Ke Ma when she was employed at the National Chung Cheng University. Ko died between 18 and 19 November 2020.

== Legacy ==
The author Yan Zeya described Ko as "a pioneer in Taiwan's promotion of reading education". In March 2021, a series of 12 memorial seminars on reading education-related issues and the life of Ko was held at Tsinghua University in her honour.
