= Stephen Shen =

Taiwanese chemical engineer and politician

Shen Shih-hung
- 沈世宏
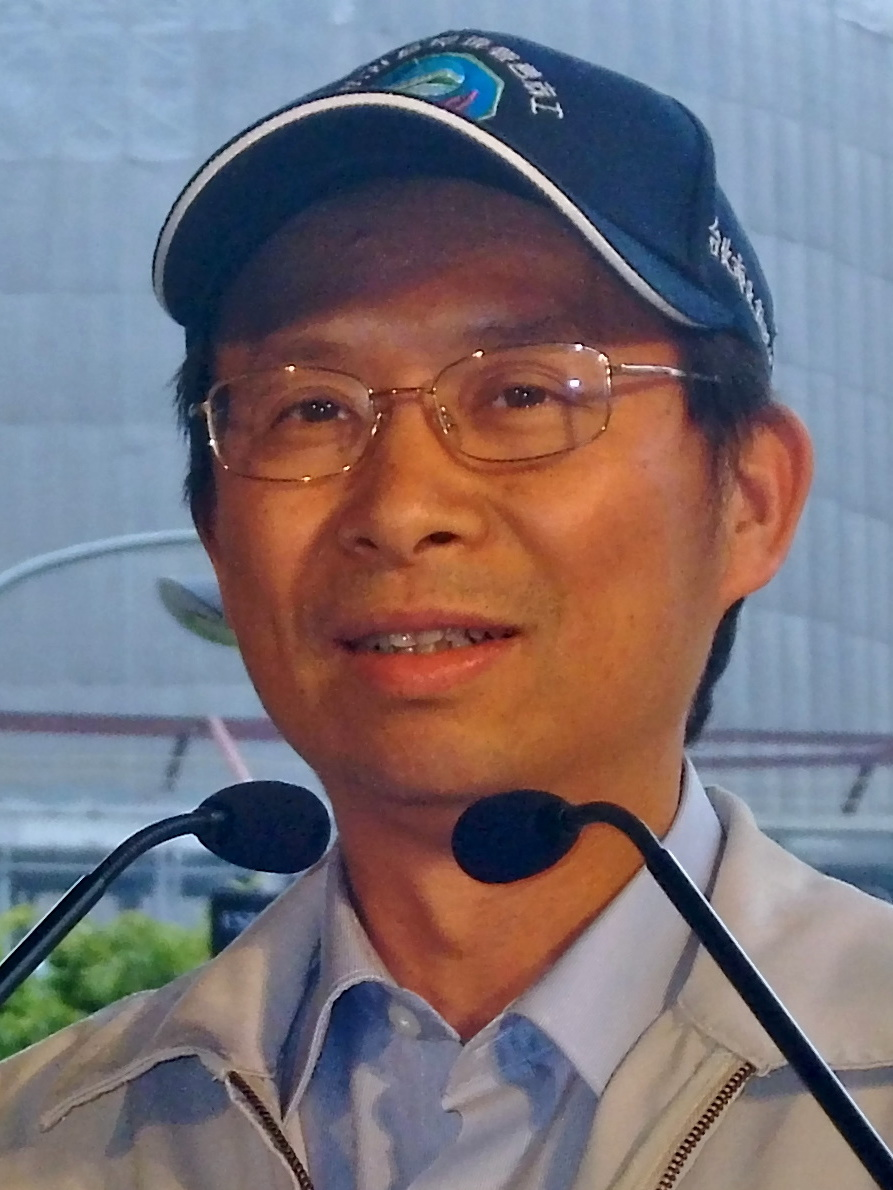

Minister of Environmental Protection Administration of the Republic of China
- In office 20 May 2008 – 2 March 2014
- Deputy: Yeh Shin-cheng; Chang Tzi-chin
- Preceded by: Winston Dang
- Succeeded by: Wei Kuo-yen

Personal details
- Born: 19 June 1949 (age 76) Taiwan
- Education: National Taiwan University (BS, MS, PhD)

Shen Shih-hung (Chinese: 沈世宏; pinyin: Shěn Shìhóng; born 19 June 1949), also known by his English name Stephen Shen, is a Taiwanese chemical engineer and politician. He was the Minister of the Environmental Protection Administration (EPA) of the Executive Yuan from 2008 to 2014.

== Education ==
Shen graduated from National Taiwan University with a Bachelor of Science (B.S.) in chemical engineering in 1971, a Master of Science (M.S.) in chemical engineering in 1975, and earned his Ph.D. in chemical engineering from the university in 1982.

== EPA Ministry ==
=== Nuclear energy over coal energy ===
In March 2013, commenting on the uncertainty regarding the completion of Taiwan's 4th nuclear power plant, the Lungmen Nuclear Power Plant, Shen said that by abolishing nuclear power plant, means Taiwan has to replace it with more coal-fired power plants, which means it will create more carbon emission to the environment and it would make Taiwan not being able to achieve its carbon reduction goal in 2020. While renewable energy is good to replace carbon-based power generation, renewable energy is still expensive and is not economical as coal, especially when it comes to electricity generation. He added that having nuclear power plant is safer compared to more coal-fired power plants because nuclear energy can be controlled, while severe climate change due to excessive carbon emission cannot be controlled at all.

=== LNG supply to Kinmen from mainland China ===
In January 2013, Shen witnessed the signing of agreement between China National Offshore Oil Corporation and Shinfox to supply Kinmen with liquefied natural gas (LNG) from mainland China. The delivery of LNG was expected to be started in early 2015 to industrial companies. At a later stage, the supply would be increased up to 100,000 tonnes per year to include power plants and households. Shen said that the cooperation is helpful to aid Taiwan in realizing Kinmen to be a tourism-focused low-carbon county.
