= Free Taiwan Party =

Free Taiwan Party 自由台灣黨
- Chairman: Tsay Ting-kuei
- Founded: 1 May 2015; 11 years ago (registered)
- Dissolved: 12 January 2023 (unregistered)
- Ideology: Taiwanese nationalism Taiwan independence Liberal democracy

Website
- freetaiwanparty.tw

The Free Taiwan Party (Chinese: 自由台灣黨) is a pro-independence political party in Taiwan. It was founded by Pan-Green activist Tsay Ting-kuei on 17 April 2015, and was registered as a political party on 1 May 2015.

The party's main claim is that, in accordance with the UN Charter and the International Covenant on Civil and Political Rights, Taiwan has the right to self-determination and recognition as an independent state if the inhabitants of the island so choose.

On January 12, 2023, the Ministry of the Interior (MOI) announced that the Free Taiwan Party had failed to recommend candidates to run for public office for four consecutive years in accordance with the law, and the MOI has revoked the registration of the Free Taiwan Party as a party under the Political Parties Act.
