= Zhu Zhixian =

Chinese psychologist

Zhu Zhixian (Chinese: 朱智贤; 31 December 1908 – 5 March 1991) was a psychologist, educator, and professor, known today as one of the founding figures of modern psychology in China. He graduated from National Central University, and then worked as a researcher in the University of Tokyo in Japan. During the Second Sino-Japanese War, he returned to China and worked in Jinagsu College of Education, Sichuan College of Education, Sun Yat-sen University and Dade College of Hong Kong. After the founding of the People's Republic of China, Zhu was responsible for the school textbooks in Ministry of Education, and then worked as associate editor in People's Education Press. In 1951, he was invited to work in Beijing Normal University. He was the chairman of Education Department, director of Institute of Child psychology, and editor of Journal of Psychological Development and Education. Zhu was one of the first doctoral tutors, and cultivated China's first doctor in psychology, Lin Chongde.

== Early life and study ==
Zhu Zhixian was born in Ganyu County in Jiangsu Province in 1908. His mother died when he was 9 years old, and big brother died when he was 12. Then, when he was 26, his father was killed by brigands. Zhu was responsible for supporting the life expenses of his step mother and three younger brothers and his own study. After finishing high school study, he entered into No. 8 Normal University in Haizhou. When he graduated in 1928, he got the teaching work in the affiliated primary school due to his excellent performance. Two years later, Zhu started his undergraduate study in National Central University in Nanjing and got the bachelor's degrees in education. During his study and teaching work, he published more than 20 articles on teaching, and several books, such as Teaching Method of Primary School History, Study on the Curriculum of Primary School, and Research Methods in Education. In his fourth grade, his book, Study on the Curriculum of Primary School, was one of the reference books recommended by his teacher.

== Representative work: Child Psychology ==
Zhu Zhixian wrote Child Psychology in 1962 which was the textbook of college students in psychology and education. The revised edition was published in 1979. This book illustrated the stage of child psychological development under the guidance of dialectical materialism. Zhu discussed the following issues in this book:

- External cause of psychological development: There was a debate for long that children's psychological development was congenital or determined by environment. Zhu analyzed and criticized Granville Stanley Hall's theory of heredity determination, John Broadus Watson's theory of education determinism and Robert Sessions Woodworth's theory of Stimulus-Organism-Response (S-O-R). He proposed that heredity is a prerequisite of children's psychological development, while environment and education is decisive condition.
- Internal cause of psychological development: Zhu thought that motivation of children's psychological development was the contradiction between requirement for children from society and education and children's mental state. This internal contradiction boosted children's psychological development.
- Education and Development: Zhu insisted that education is necessary for children's psychological development. The external and internal causes cannot boost children's psychological development without education, but education plays role through external and internal causes. Therefore, children's psychological development is determined by education condition which is suitable for children's psychological development.

== Later life ==
In 1979, when he was 71 years old, the revised edition of Child Psychology was published by People's press.

In 1980, Zhu edited Speech of Education of Children Psychology which was published by Beijing Normal University Press.

In 1982, His book Encyclopedia of Children's Family Education was awarded the second prize of national outstanding science and technology books. He edited the book, Teaching Reference Materials of Child psychology, was published by Beijing Normal University Press.

In 1983, he was in charge of the national key scientific research project "Psychological development and education of Chinese adolescent". More than 200 psychological researchers participated in this project.

In 1984, he and his student Lin Chongde edited the book, Developmental Psychology of Thinking, which was published in 1986.

In 1985, he built the Institute of Child Psychology and the Journal of Psychological Development and Education. He was the director of Institute of Child psychology.

In 1986, he led the compilation of Dictionary of Psychology which was published by Beijing Normal University Press and awarded first prize of Chinese book.

In 1988, he and Lin Chongde edited the book History of Child Psychology, which was published Beijing Normal University Press.

Zhu Zhixian died on March 5, 1991.

== Selected publications ==
Zhu Zhixian published more than 200 articles or books in his life. Important papers include evaluation of Piaget's theory of child development, Pavlovism, Dewey's Functionalism, and so on. The important books include Child Psychology, Research Methods in Education, History of Child psychology, Developmental Psychology of thinking etc.

- -- (1955). Pavlovism is Natural Science Foundation of Marxism–Leninism: Introducing Reading Materials of Pavlovism to Dialectic Materialists (in Chinese). Reading, 3, 010.
- -- (1956). Critique of the Viewpoint of Functionalist Dewey in Psychology (in Chinese). Journal of Beijing Normal University (Social Science), 1-32.
- -- (1962). Child Psychology. People's Education Press, Beijing, China.
- -- (1962). Several Questions about Characteristics of Children's Mental Age (in Chinese). Journal of Beijing Normal University (Social Science), 1–10.
- -- (1979). Several Basic Issues in Child Psychology Research (in Chinese). Journal of Beijing Normal University (Social Science), 1, 007.
- -- (1980). Evaluation of Piaget's Theory of Child Cognitive Development (in Chinese). Journal of Beijing Normal University. 1, 008.
- -- (1981). Several Questions about Children's Intelligence Development (in Chinese). Journal of Beijing Normal University (Social Science), 1, 39–46.
