= Chang Kow-lung =

Taiwanese physicist and government official

- 張國龍
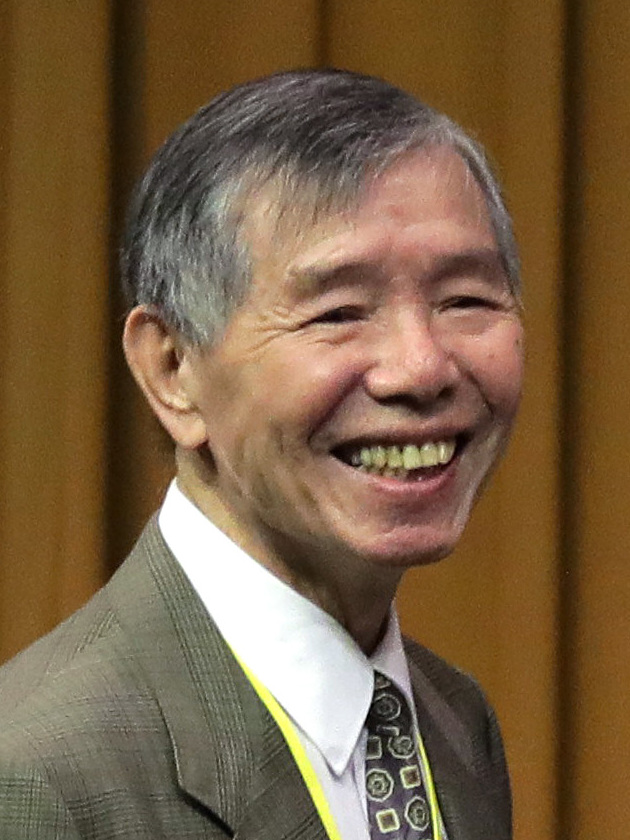

Minister of the Environmental Protection Administration
- In office 8 June 2005 – 20 May 2007
- Preceded by: Chang Juu-en; Tsay Ting-kuei (acting)
- Succeeded by: Winston Dang

Personal details
- Born: 1938 (age 87–88)
- Education: National Taiwan University (BS); Yale University (PhD)
- Scientific career
- Fields: Physics
- Thesis: A unified formulation of effective nonlinear Meson-Baryon lagrangians (1968)

Chang Kow-lung (Chinese: 張國蘢; born 1938) is a Taiwanese particle physicist who served as the Minister of the Environmental Protection Administration between 2005 and 2007.

== Education and activism ==
Chang entered National Taiwan University in 1959 and graduated with a bachelor's degree in physics in 1963 with highest honors. He then completed doctoral studies in the United States at Yale University, where he won the university's Leigh Page Prize for distinction in physics in 1965. Chang earned his Ph.D. in particle physics from Yale in 1968.

After receiving his doctorate, Chang taught at National Taiwan University starting in 1976 and participated in Taiwan's environmental movement beginning in the 1980s. In 1988, Chang founded a magazine, New Environment. Shortly afterwards, in 1990, he launched the Taiwan Environmental Protection Union. That year, he became a secretary in the Taipei City Government, where he worked for ten years. In 2000, Chang was named vice minister of examinations.

A noted anti-nuclear activist, Chang has served as spokesman for the Nuke-4 Referendum Initiative Association.

== Environmental Protection Administration ==
Premier Frank Hsieh appointed Chang Kow-lung head of the Environmental Protection Administration on 8 June 2005. That August, Chang announced a three-year plan to clean up the polluted Tamsui River. The next month, Chang ordered sanitation companies to stop gathering kitchen waste to use as a component in pig feed, after discussions with the Council of Agriculture. He also worked to pass laws regarding greenhouse gas emissions, later starting a global warming awareness initiative. Chang supported implementation of an ecotax for Taiwanese factories in 2006. However, the next year, environmentalist Robin Winkler claimed that the EPA favored industry over the environment. Chang then tried to sue Winkler for slandering the EPA. Chang resigned his position in May 2007, and was replaced by Winston Dang in June.
