= Chang Juu-en =

Taiwanese engineer

- 張祖恩
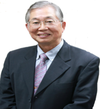

Minister of the Environmental Protection Administration
- In office 6 October 2003 – 25 April 2005
- Preceded by: Hau Lung-pin
- Succeeded by: Tsay Ting-kuei (acting); Chang Kow-lung

Personal details
- Born: 1951 (age 74–75)
- Education: National Cheng Kung University (BS, MS); Tohoku University (PhD)

Chang Juu-en (Chinese: 張祖恩; pinyin: Zhāng Zǔ'ēn; Pe̍h-ōe-jī: Tiuⁿ Chó͘-un; born 1951) is a Taiwanese civil engineer who served as Minister of the Environmental Protection Administration from 2003 to 2005.

== Early life and academic career ==
Chang was born in 1951 and raised on a farm in Taiwan. After graduating from National Cheng Kung University (NCKU) with a B.S. and M.S., he earned a Ph.D. in civil engineering from Tohoku University in Japan. Chang began teaching at NCKU in 1982, and was named deputy minister of the Environmental Protection Administration under the leadership of Hau Lung-pin in April 2001.

== Environmental Protection Administration ==
Hau Lung-pin resigned from the Environmental Protection Administration on 1 October 2003, due to a disagreement on whether to implement referendum results despite concerns raised in a professional environmental impact assessment. Premier Yu Shyi-kun appointed Chang Juu-en to succeed Hau in an acting capacity after accepting Hau's resignation on 5 October.

Upon taking office, Chang pushed the government to build more incinerators, a recommendation that incited severe backlash across Taiwan. He made attempts to regulate the recycling of e-waste. Chang was criticized in 2004 for proposing an expensive three-year action plan during an election year, as it was not a guarantee that he would be retained. However, he kept his post after the election, and worked to clean the Fengshan River. Chang resigned in April 2005 and returned to teaching at National Cheng Kung University.
