= Tsay Ting-kuei =

Taiwanese civil engineering professor, political activist and government official

- 蔡丁貴
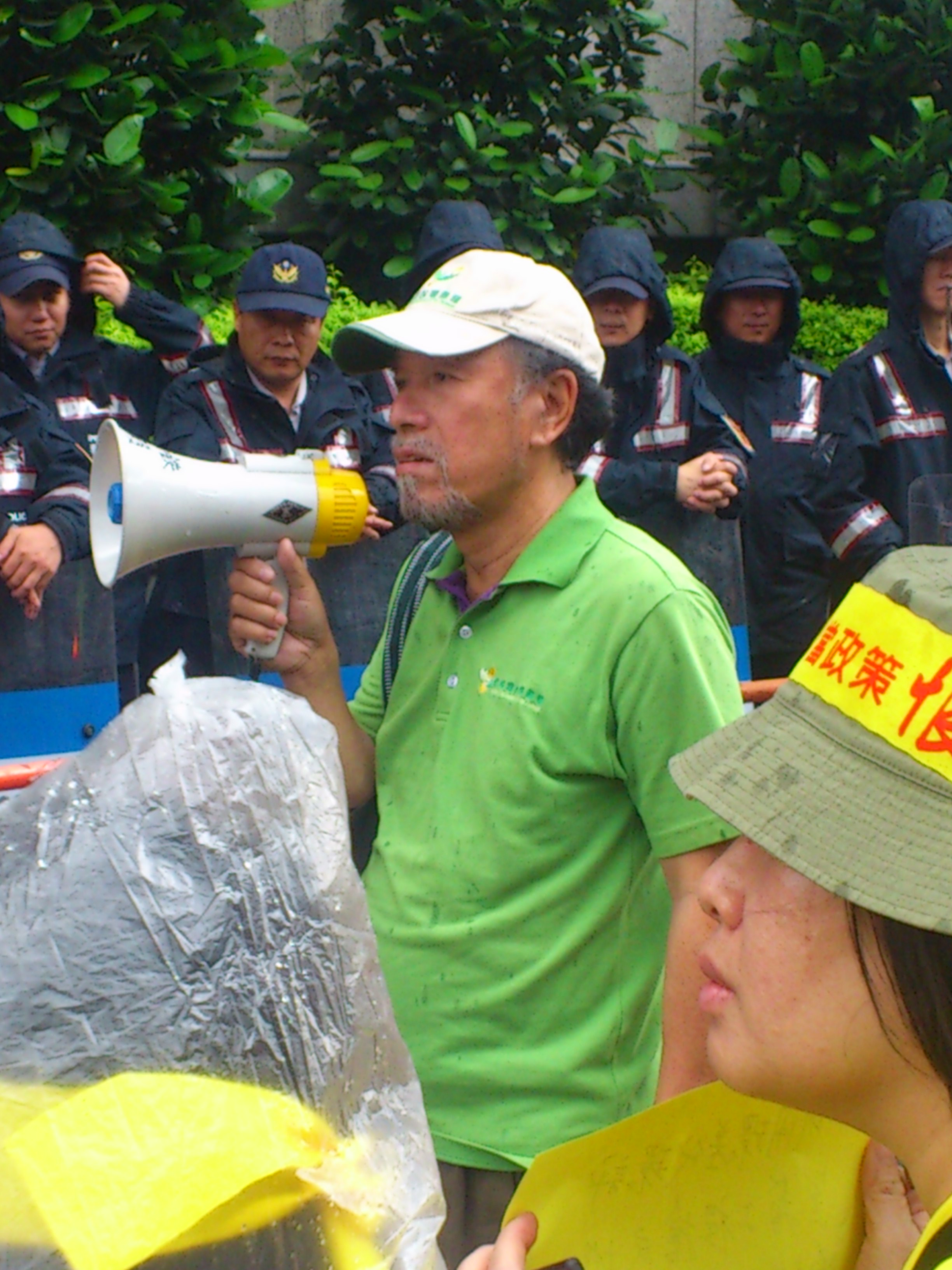
- Tsay Ting-kuei in May 2014
- Born: March 24, 1949 (age 77); Zihguan, Kaohsiung, Taiwan, Republic of China
- Citizenship: Republic of China; United States (1990–2002)
- Education: National Cheng Kung University (BS, MS); Cornell University (PhD)
- Political party: Free Taiwan Party (2015–)
- Scientific career
- Fields: Civil engineering
- Institutions: National Taiwan University
- Thesis: Numerical solutions for combined water-wave refraction and diffraction (1982)
- Doctoral advisor: Philip LF Liu

Chinese name
- Traditional Chinese: 蔡丁貴
- Simplified Chinese: 蔡丁贵
Transcriptions
Standard Mandarin
- Hanyu Pinyin: Cài Dīngguì
- Gwoyeu Romatzyh: Tsay Dingguey
- Wade–Giles: Ts'ai^{4} Ting^{1}-kwei^{4}
Southern Min
- Hokkien POJ: Chhòa Teng-kùi

Tsay Ting-kuei (Chinese: 蔡丁貴; Pe̍h-ōe-jī: Chhòa Teng-kùi; born 24 March 1949) is a Taiwanese civil engineer and political activist. He is a professor of engineering at National Taiwan University, where he has conducted research in areas including coastal engineering and computational hydraulics. In politics, he served in various positions in the Chen Shui-bian administration in the mid-2000s, and rose to greater prominence for his protests in support of the Taiwan independence movement.

== Early life and education ==
Tsay was born in Ziguan District, Kaohsiung, on March 24, 1949. He graduated from National Cheng Kung University with a Bachelor of Science (B.S.) in hydraulic engineering in 1971 and a Master of Science (M.S.) in civil engineering in 1973. From 1975 to 1978, he was a lecturer of civil engineering at National Chung Hsing University. He then moved to the United States and earned his Ph.D. from Cornell University in 1982. He wrote his doctoral dissertation on numerical solutions to certain hydraulics problems.

== Academic career ==
Because of Tsay's support for the Tangwai movement, Taiwan's Kuomintang government blacklisted him, making it impossible for him to return. Instead, he pursued his academic career in the United States for the next eight years, and was naturalised as a U.S. citizen. After conducting postdoctoral research at Cornell University from 1982 to 1983, he took up a position as an assistant professor at Syracuse University, and was promoted to associate professor in 1986. He returned to Taiwan in 1990, a few years after the end of martial law on the island, to take up a new position as a professor at National Taiwan University.

== In government ==
In 2002, Tsay was named vice-chairman of the Executive Yuan's Research, Development and Evaluation Commission. Because Taiwan does not allow civil servants to hold dual citizenship, he renounced U.S. citizenship to take up the position. He served in that position until 2004, after which he became vice-chairman of the Environmental Protection Administration until 2005, and took up the position of acting chairman in between the terms of Chang Juu-en and Chang Kuo-long.

== Political protests ==
In October 2008, Tsay led the Taiwan Association of University Professors in a hunger strike outside the Legislative Yuan building in support of relaxation of the procedures for public referendums. Since the passage of the 2003 Referendum Law, the government would only review referendum proposals supported by the signatures of at least 0.5% of the voter turnout in the most recent presidential election; whether or not to hold the referendum remained the decision of a government-appointed board. Tsay's goal was to make it easier for a Taiwan independence referendum to be proposed and conducted. He eventually created the Taiwan Referendum Alliance in support of this goal.

What was initially intended to be a 24-hour protest ended up turning into a years-long event. By January 2010, he had been assessed fines of more than NT$800,000 relating to his occupation of public space during the sit-in protest. Lacking funds to pay the fines, Tsay and his supporters began soliciting donations outside the Presidential Office in Taipei, due to which he was arrested and had further fines assessed against him, in that case for alleged violations of the Assembly and Parade Act. The donations were largely in the form of coins; Tsay and his fellow protestors spent nine hours in the police station counting the reported three hundred and sixty thousand coins. In 2012, Tsay and the TRA also initiated a walking protest in support of clemency for former president Chen Shui-bian, who had been imprisoned after a conviction for corruption charges.

In late February 2014, about a week before the 67th anniversary of the February 28 Incident, Tsay led a group of fellow Taiwan Referendum Alliance members in removing a statue of Sun Yat-sen from Tang De-jhang Memorial Park in Tainan, a park named for a local lawyer executed during the military crackdown which followed the February 28 Incident. Kuomintang politicians including Fan Chiang Tai-chi condemned the TRA's actions. During the March and April 2014 Sunflower Student Movement, Tsay and the TRA also led sympathy protests outside of the Legislative Yuan. After the removal of protestors from the square in front of the Legislative Yuan, Tsay led further protests outside the Zhongzheng First Police Precinct station.

== Selected works ==
- Numerical solutions for combined water-wave refraction and diffraction. Ph.D. dissertation. Cornell University. 1982. OCLC 704461473.
- Chiang, Shih-Min; Tsay, Ting-Kuei; Nix, Stephen J. (2002). "Hydrologic Regionalization of Watersheds. I: Methodology Development" (PDF). Journal of Water Resources Planning and Management. 128 (1): 3–11. doi:10.1061/(ASCE)0733-9496(2002)128:1(3).
