= Wei Kuo-yen =

Taiwanese oceanographer

- 魏國彥
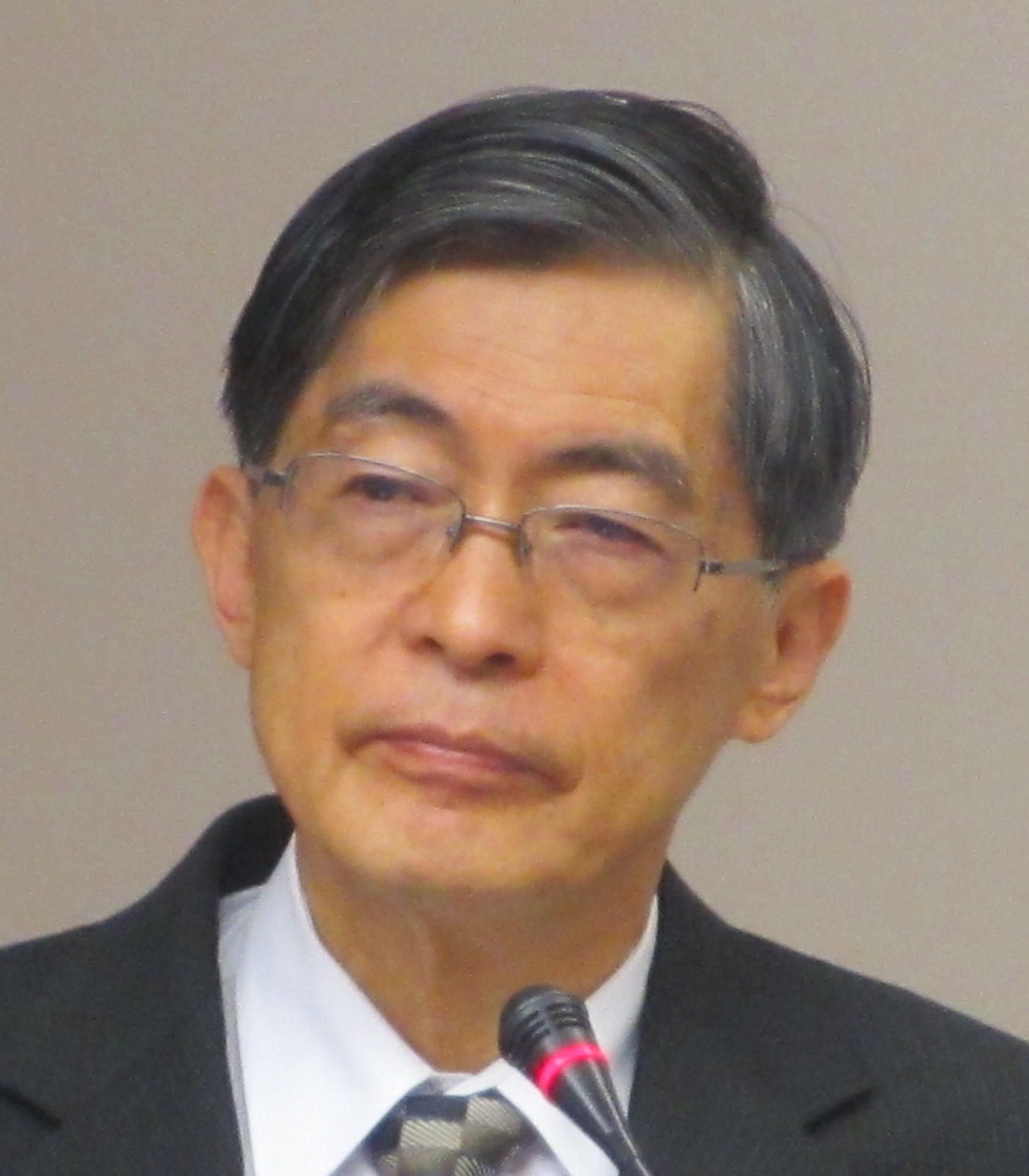

Minister of the Environmental Protection Administration of the Republic of China
- In office 3 March 2014 – 20 May 2016
- Preceded by: Stephen Shen
- Succeeded by: Lee Ying-yuan

Deputy Minister of the Research, Development and Evaluation Commission of the Republic of China
- In office 2009–2010
- Minister: Chu Chin-peng

Personal details
- Born: 5 February 1953 (age 73) Taiwan
- Education: National Taiwan University (BS, MS); University of Rhode Island (PhD)

Wei Kuo-yen (Chinese: 魏國彥; pinyin: Wèi Guóyàn; born 5 February 1953) is a Taiwanese oceanographer. He was the Minister of the Environmental Protection Administration from 3 March 2014 to 20 May 2016.

== Education ==
Wei graduated from National Taiwan University with a Bachelor of Science (B.S.) in geology in 1975 and a Master of Science (M.S.) in geology in 1978. He then completed doctoral studies in the United States, earning his Ph.D. in oceanography from the University of Rhode Island in 1987 under oceanographer James P. Kennett. His doctoral dissertation was titled, "Tempo and mode of evolution in neogene planktonic foraminifera: Taxonomic and morphological evidence".

== Academic career ==
After receiving his doctorate, Wei completed postdoctoral research at the University of California, Santa Barbara. He then taught geology and geophysics as an assistant professor at Yale University.

== Political career ==
Wei was named the Minister of the Environmental Protection Administration in February 2014. After the T.S. Taipei ran aground off the coast of Shimen District on 10 March 2016 and caused an oil spill, Wei attempted to resign.

== Personal life ==
Wei suffered heart attack during a legislative hearing on 31 March 2016 and was admitted to National Taiwan University Hospital.
