= Winston Dang =

Taiwanese biochemist, pharmacist, and politician

Dang Tion-sin
- 陳重信

Minister of Environmental Protection Administration of the Republic of China
- In office 20 May 2007 – 20 May 2008
- Preceded by: Chang Kuo-long
- Succeeded by: Stephen Shen

Member of the Legislative Yuan
- In office 1 February 2005 – 20 May 2007
- Succeeded by: Chen Tung-jung
- Constituency: Overseas Chinese

Personal details
- Born: 1943 (age 81–82)
- Political party: Democratic Progressive Party
- Education: Taipei Medical University (BS); Columbia University (MS); City University of New York (PhD); Harvard University (MPH)

Dang Tion-sin (Chinese: 陳重信; pinyin: Chén Zhòngxìn; Pe̍h-ōe-jī: Tân Tiông-sìn; born 1943), also known by his English name Winston Dang, is a Taiwanese biochemist, pharmacist, and politician who is a member of the Democratic Progressive Party. He was elected to the Legislative Yuan in 2004, and served through 2007, when he was appointed leader of the Environmental Protection Administration. He stepped down from the agency in 2008.

== Education ==
Dang graduated from Taipei Medical University with a Bachelor of Science in pharmacy in 1967. He then completed advanced studies in the United States, earning a Master of Science (M.S.) in pharmacology from Columbia University in 1970 and his Ph.D. in biochemistry from the City University of New York in 1974. In 1989, Dang earned a Master of Public Health (M.P.H.) from the Harvard T.H. Chan School of Public Health of Harvard University.

== Career ==
Dang worked for the United States Environmental Protection Agency, prior to his return to Taiwan and election to the Legislative Yuan as a Democratic Progressive Party representative of overseas Chinese.

Dang was appointed head of the Environmental Protection Administration by Chen Shui-bian after the 2004 elections, and Dang renounced his U.S. citizenship to take up the position. His work as minister earned him the nickname "the over-educated garbage man". He served in the position until 2008, when he was succeeded by Stephen Shen.
