= National Central University =

Research university in Taoyuan City, Taiwan

- 國立中央大學 (Chinese)
- Former names: Nanking Higher Normal School (1915–1923); National Southeastern University (1921–1927); National Central University (1928–1949); National Central University Graduate Institute of Geophysics (1962–1968); National Central University College of Science (1968–1979)
- Motto: 誠樸 (Pha̍k-fa-sṳ: shîn-phok; Pe̍h-ōe-jī: sêng-phok)
- Motto in English: Sincerity and Simplicity
- Type: Public
- Established: 1915; 111 years ago (Note: See § History for details)
- Affiliations: UST; UAiTED; AACSB
- President: Jing-Yang Jou
- Academic staff: 746 (full time)
- Undergraduates: 5,743
- Postgraduates: 6,037
- Location: Zhongli, Taoyuan City, Taiwan; 24°58′06″N 121°11′34″E
- Campus: Suburban
- Website: www.ncu.edu.tw

Chinese name
- Simplified Chinese: 国立中央大学
- Traditional Chinese: 國立中央大學
Transcriptions
Standard Mandarin
- Hanyu Pinyin: Guólì Zhōngyāng Dàxué
Hakka
- Pha̍k-fa-sṳ: Kwet-li̍p Chung-yong Thài-ho̍k
Southern Min
- Hokkien POJ: Kok-li̍p Tiong-iong Tāi-ha̍k

National Central University (Chinese: 國立中央大學; pinyin: Guólì Zhōngyāng Dàxué; abbreviated NCU; 中大; Zhōngdà) is a public research university in Zhongli, Taoyuan City, Taiwan. Founded in 1915 in Nanking, it was reestablished in Taiwan in 1968 after the Chinese Civil War and gained its current name in 1979.

The university is organized into eight colleges, 26 departments, 19 graduate institutes, and six research centers. It is one of the six national universities in research selected by the Ministry of Education. (Note: The others are Taiwan, Tsing Hua, Yang Ming Chiao Tung, Cheng Kung and Sun Yat-sen Universities.)

== History ==
According to The History Evolution of National Central University (國立中央大學沿革史) of 1937, the precursor of the university was founded in the winter of the first year of Sun Xiu's reign (AD 258) during the era of Three Kingdoms. Since this foundation, it has evolved and adopted different names in each dynasty or period in imperial China. Its immediate predecessor was a modern institution of higher learning established in Nanking (Nanjing) in 1902 during the Qing Dynasty, the Sanjiang Normal School (三江師範學堂, which was renamed the Liangjiang Higher Normal School (兩江優級師範學堂) in 1906. This was closed in 1911 when the Qing Dynasty was overthrown.

In 1915 after the Republic of China has been proclaimed, the Nanking Higher Normal School (南京高等師範學校) was established to replace the Liangjiang Higher Normal School, and it is this year that is most often cited as the establishment of the National Central University now based in Taiwan. (Note: While 1915 is considered the year of the "founding" (創校) of the school, the university does consider 1902 to be its year of "origin" (源頭).) In 1921, the National Southeastern University (國立東南大學) based on the normal school was established by the Beiyang Government. With the success of the Northern Expedition and the national government establishment its capital in Nanking in 1927, the university was reorganized and give the name National Fourth Sun Yat-sen University (國立第四中山大學), as Nanking was the fourth major city conquered in the expedition. Early the following year it was renamed National Kiangsu University (國立江蘇大學) and then simply Kiangsu University (江蘇大學) in quick succession. Dissatisfied with the lack of "national" in the name, professors and students struck for a new name, and in May 1928 the university became the National Central University (國立中央大學).

Following Japanese invasion of China 1937, the Nationalist regime relocated westward to the temporary capital of Chungking (Chongqing), and with it, NCU moved to the west as well. Upon its relocation to Chungking, the university was given 200 mu of land by Chungking University, and a cooperative relationship was established between the two universities. During this period, many distinguished professors taught at both universities, contributing significantly to the academic environment. These included notable figures such as Li Siguang, a renowned geologist; Xu Beihong, a famous painter and art educator; Wu Guanzhong, an accomplished painter and art educator; Ma Yinchu, an influential economist and educator; He Lu, a prominent physicist; and Lu Zuofu, a distinguished literary scholar. This era of collaboration not only strengthened the academic capabilities of both universities but also played a crucial role in preserving and advancing China's educational and cultural institutions amid the challenges of war.

During the rule of Wang Jingwei's Japanese puppet regime in Nanking from 1940 to 1945, a small National Central University was also established on the campus of what had been the Central Political Institute.

Following the end of World War II, National Central University reopened in Nanking in November 1946, with its main campus in the Sipailou area. After the Nationalist government lost Nanking to the Chinese Communist Party during the Chinese Civil War, that university's name was changed from National Central University to National Nanjing University (國立南京大學) in 1949. It subsequently has gone through a number of name changes and reorganizations.

After the communists took control of China, the Nationalist regime retreated to Taiwan. Beginning with Chengchi University in 1954, there was an effort at restoration of other national universities from China in Taiwan, such as Tsing Hua in 1956 and Chiao Tung in 1958. National Central University was first reestablished in Taiwan in 1962 as the National Central University Graduate Institute of Geophysics (國立中央大學地球物理研究所) in Miaoli County. In 1968, NCU moved to its current location in the Shuanglianpo area of what was then Zhongli City in Taoyuan County (now Zhongli District of Taoyuan City) and was renamed the National Central University College of Science (國立中央大學理學院). In 1979, it was officially restored under the name National Central University. In 2003, NCU and three other national universities established the University System of Taiwan cooperative partnership. NCU is now a research-oriented national comprehensive university. NCU was the first university in Taiwan to research industrial economics and economic development (Taiwan's Consumer Confidence Index is released monthly by NCU).

== Location ==
The university's Taoyuan City campus is situated in the northern part of the island, about 35 kilometres (22 mi) away from the capital Taipei and 3.5 kilometres (2.2 mi) from Zhongli railway station. NCU campus is 13 kilometres (8.1 mi) away from Taiwan Taoyuan International Airport.

NCU Lulin Observatory is located near Yushan National Park, in the southern part of Taiwan.

== Academics ==
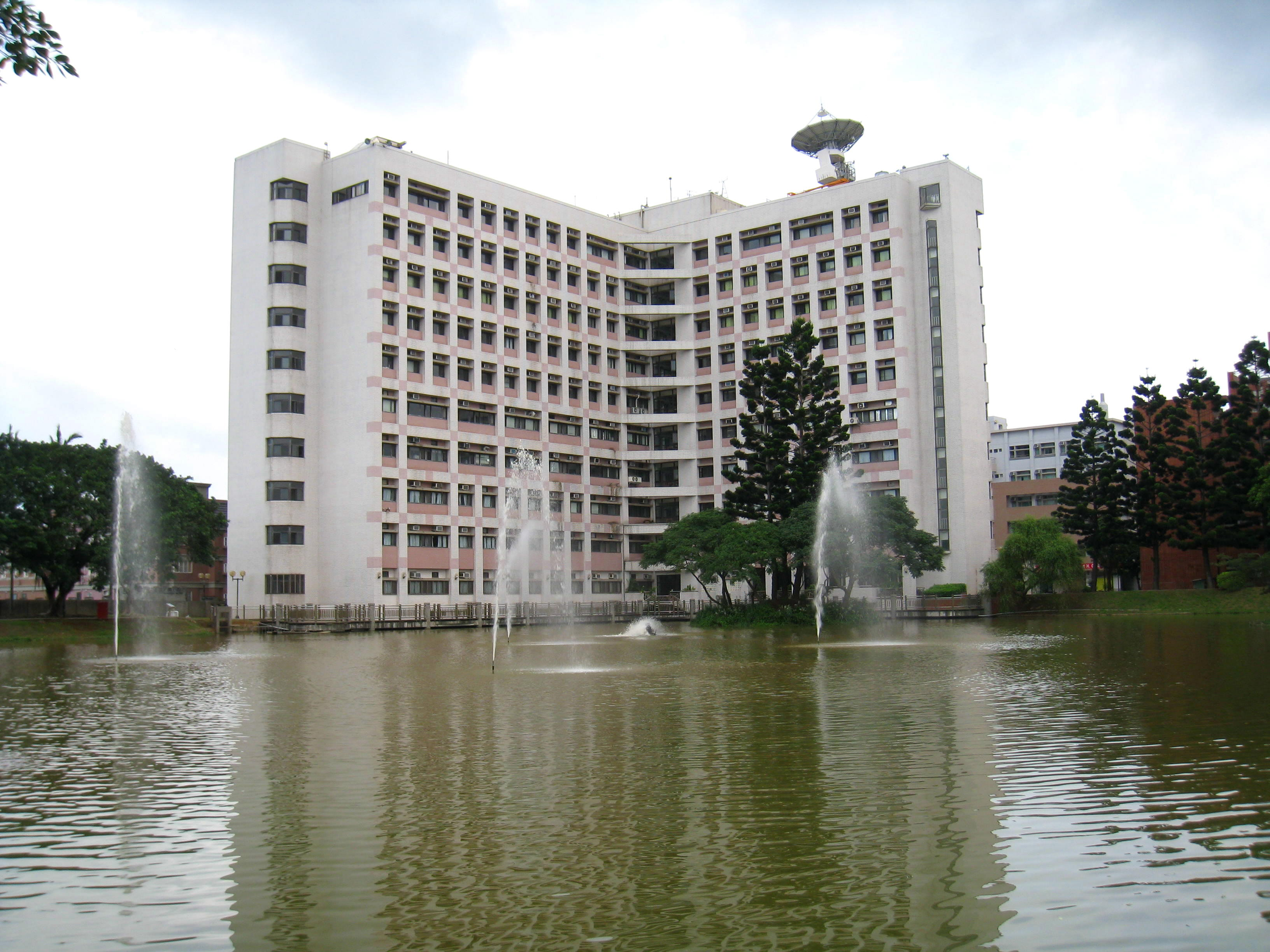
National Central University

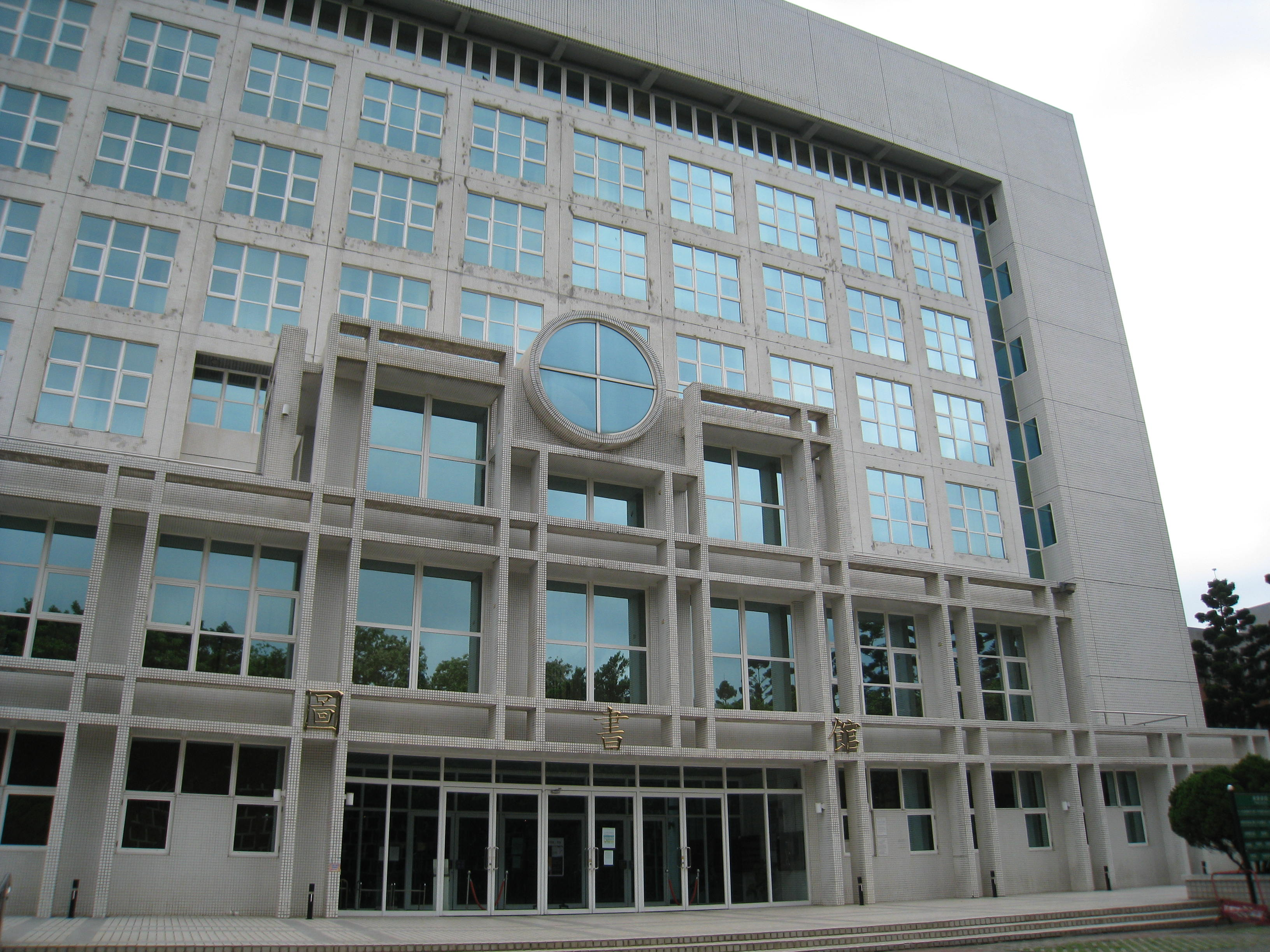
Library

University rankings

Global – Overall
- ARWU World: 901-1000 (2025)
- QS World: =587 (2026)
- THE World: 1001–1200 (2025)
- USNWR Global: 1072 (2025)

Regional – Overall
- QS Asia: 112 (2025)
- THE Asia: 251–300 (2025)

NCU consists of eight colleges:

- College of Earth Science
- College of Electrical Engineering and Computer Science
- College of Engineering
- College of Hakka Studies
- College of Health Science and Technology
- College of Liberal Arts
- College of Science
- College of Management

Each college houses numerous research centers, such as the Center for Space & Remote Sensing Research, Hazard Mitigation & Prevention, Taiwan Economic Development, Biotechnology & Biomedical Engineering, and several boutique-style humanities centers. In total, the eight colleges contain 19 undergraduate departments, 48 graduate institutes, and 38 research centers.

The undergraduate population is represented by the Associated Students of National Central University (Chinese: 國立中央大學學生會; pinyin: Guólì Zhōngyāng Dàxué Xuéshēnghuì), founded in 1991.

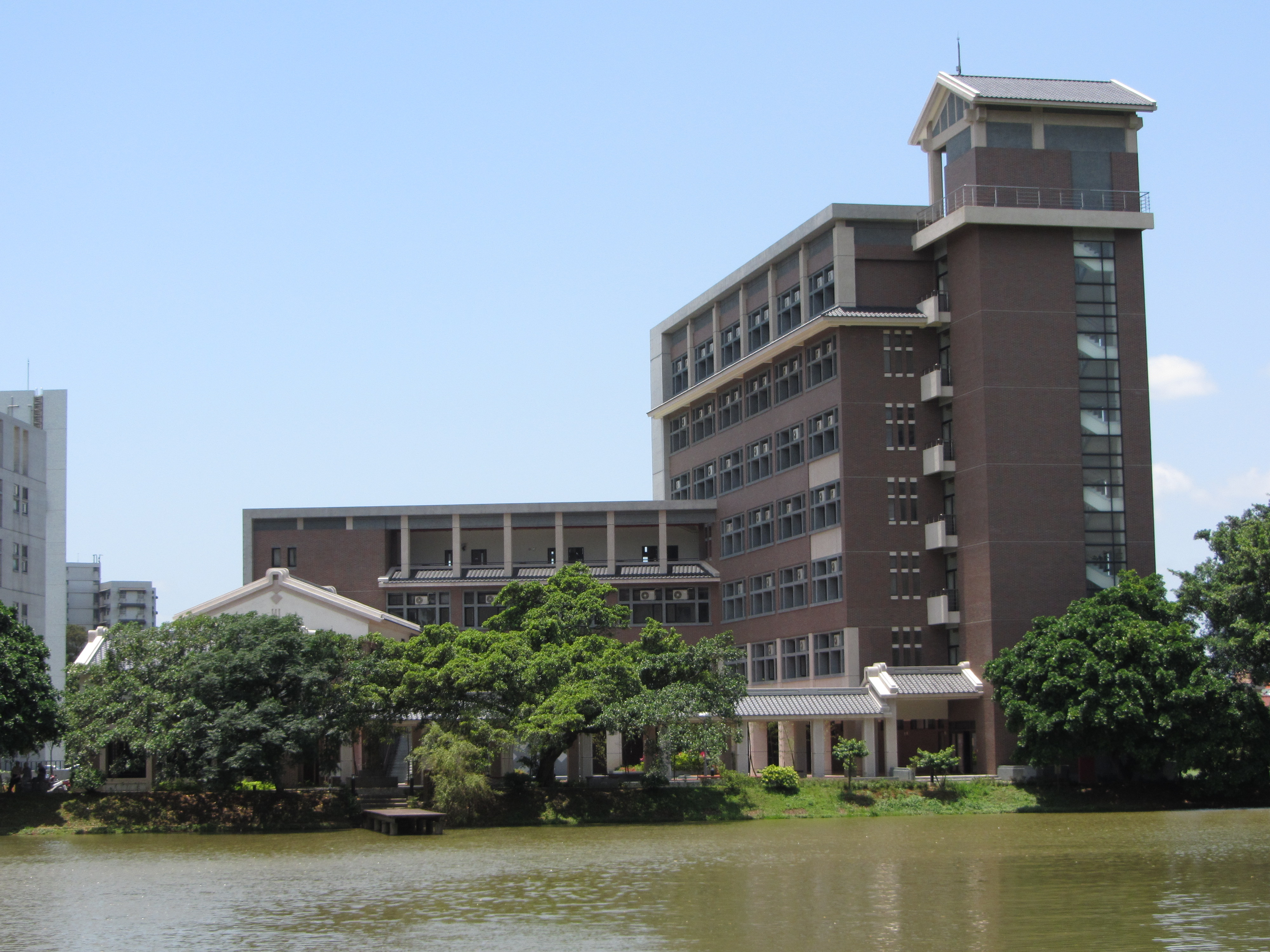
College of Hakka Studies

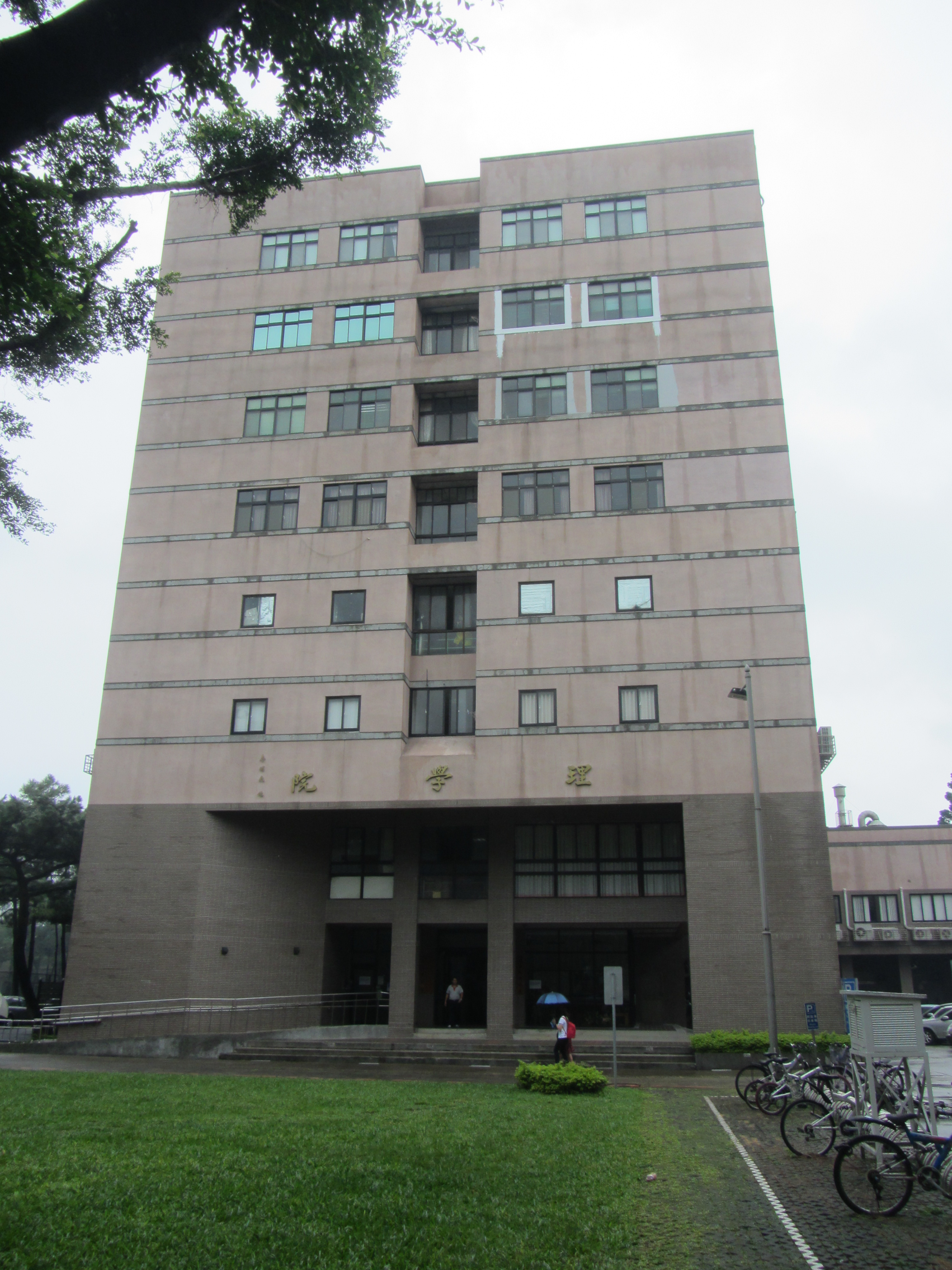
College of Science

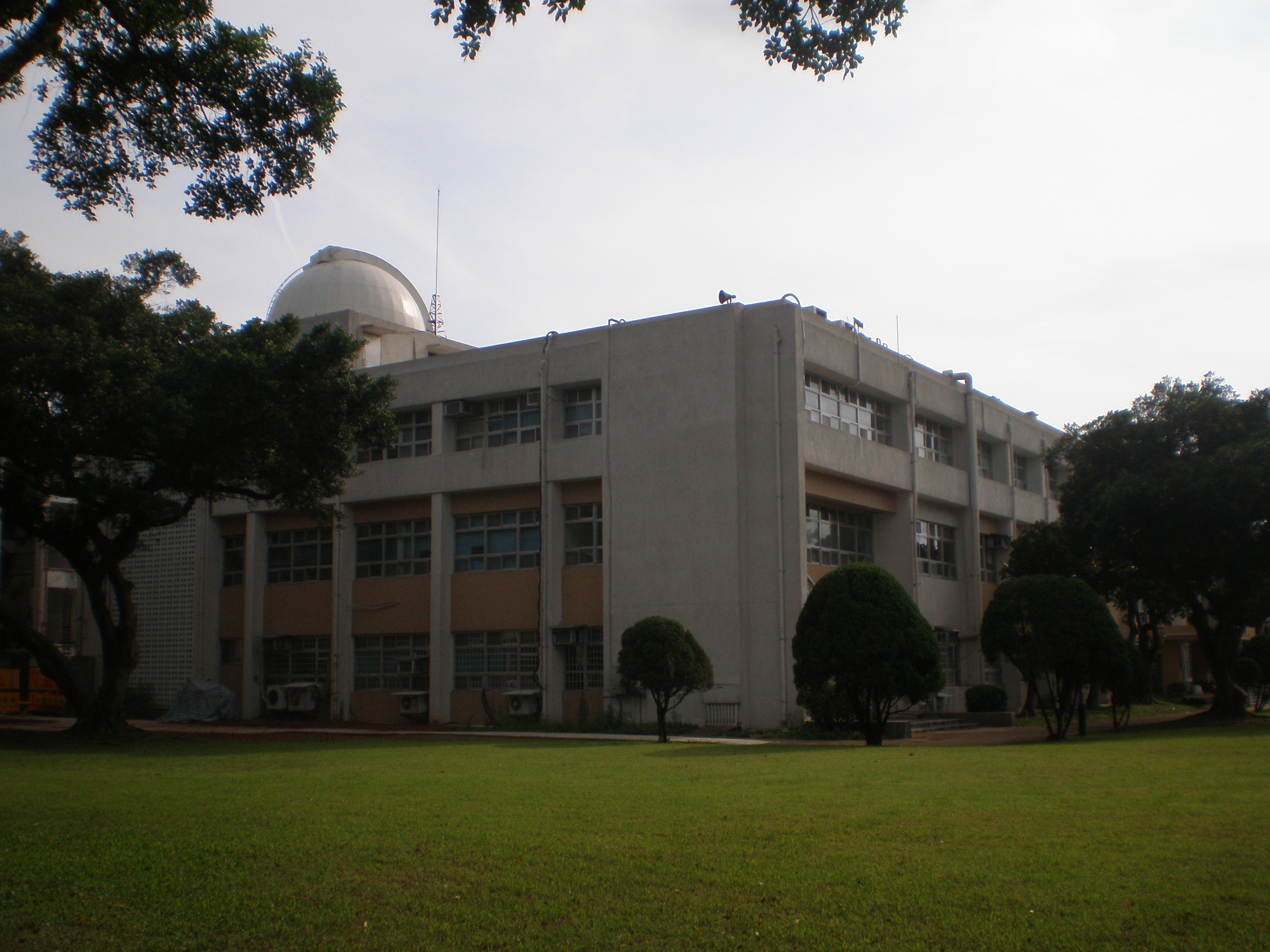
College of Earth Science

== International programs ==
NCU participates in the Taiwan International Graduate Program in Earth System Science of Academia Sinica, Taiwan's most preeminent academic research institution.

== Notable alumni and faculty ==
- Chien-Shiung Wu, a famous particle and experimental physicist
- Jiang Zemin, politician and leader of the People's Republic of China
- Li Kwoh-ting, economist and politician
- Peng Chi-ming, meteorologist and Minister of Environment
- Hwawei Ko, pedagogue and professor
- Hu Shih, professor, political theorist, and diplomat in the Republic of China
- Zhu Zhixian (朱智贤), child psychologist and professor

== See also ==
- List of universities in Taiwan
  - List of schools in the Republic of China reopened in Taiwan
