= Weather insurance =

Financial protection from inclement weather

Weather insurance insures against weather variations. There are two insurable types of weather insurance: conditional weather insurance and weather cancellation insurance.

The integration of advanced technologies such as AI in the insurance industry is influencing the field of weather insurance. According to a recent industry report, these technologies facilitate the analysis of large datasets, leading to improved predictions of weather patterns. This advancement is important for weather insurance, as it aids in refining risk assessments and pricing models.

== Weather cancellation insurance ==
Weather cancellation insurance reduces an organization’s risk in planning an outdoor event. When a company or organization is holding a concert, running a special event, having a sale, or executing any form of outdoor activity and the weather prevents that activity from taking place, the organization risks losing whatever money that has been invested in the planning, organization, marketing and operation of the event. Weather cancellation insurance ensures that if inclement weather does occur, the organization will not lose their investment. Instead, an insurance company will cover those costs based on the size and type of the weather cancellation insurance purchased.

== Conditional weather insurance ==
Conditional weather insurance gives companies the ability to make promotional sales offers based on the weather; this form of insurance used by businesses and organizations to increase publicity and drive traffic and sales. With conditional weather insurance an organization can run a promotion advertising up to a 100% rebate on all items purchased during a designated promotional period if a particular type and/or volume of weather occurs on a specific day. For example, a retailer could give a year's worth of payments to the first 100 people who bought a car in November if it snows 6” on New Year’s Day. This form of insurance is typically used by retailers to drive sales prior to national holidays such as New Year’s or 4 July.

== How weather insurance is rated ==
Insurance companies rate weather insurance based on the weather peril date, the location of the event (city and state) and history of the weather peril that is being underwritten (temperature, rain, snow, etc.) as well as the size of the policy that is being insured.

For example, a state fair may wish to purchase weather cancellation insurance to cover the costs associated with running an outdoor concert in the event it rains heavily during their outdoor concert hours. The fair would contact their insurance agency no less than two weeks prior to the event date. The insurer would look up the weather history for their particular location. If the client's venue has a history of heavy rains during those dates over the past x years, the premium would be higher than if it were held in an area where rain rarely occurs. The total amount the client wishes to insure is also taken into consideration.

If a car dealership wanted to insure a conditional weather promotion in which new car buyers would receive a rebate if at least 2 inches of rain fell at their location on the day after Easter, the client would need to contact the insurance company about two weeks prior to the peril date. The insurer, in turn, would price the insurance policy based on weather history for that city and state on the date that is being "insured", the type of peril being covered, and the volume of sales expected during the promotion.

== See also ==
- Crop insurance
- Flood insurance
- Index-based insurance
