= Ministry of Environment (Taiwan) =

Government agency in Taiwan

- 環境部; Huánjìng Bù (Mandarin); Fàn-kín Phu (Hakka)
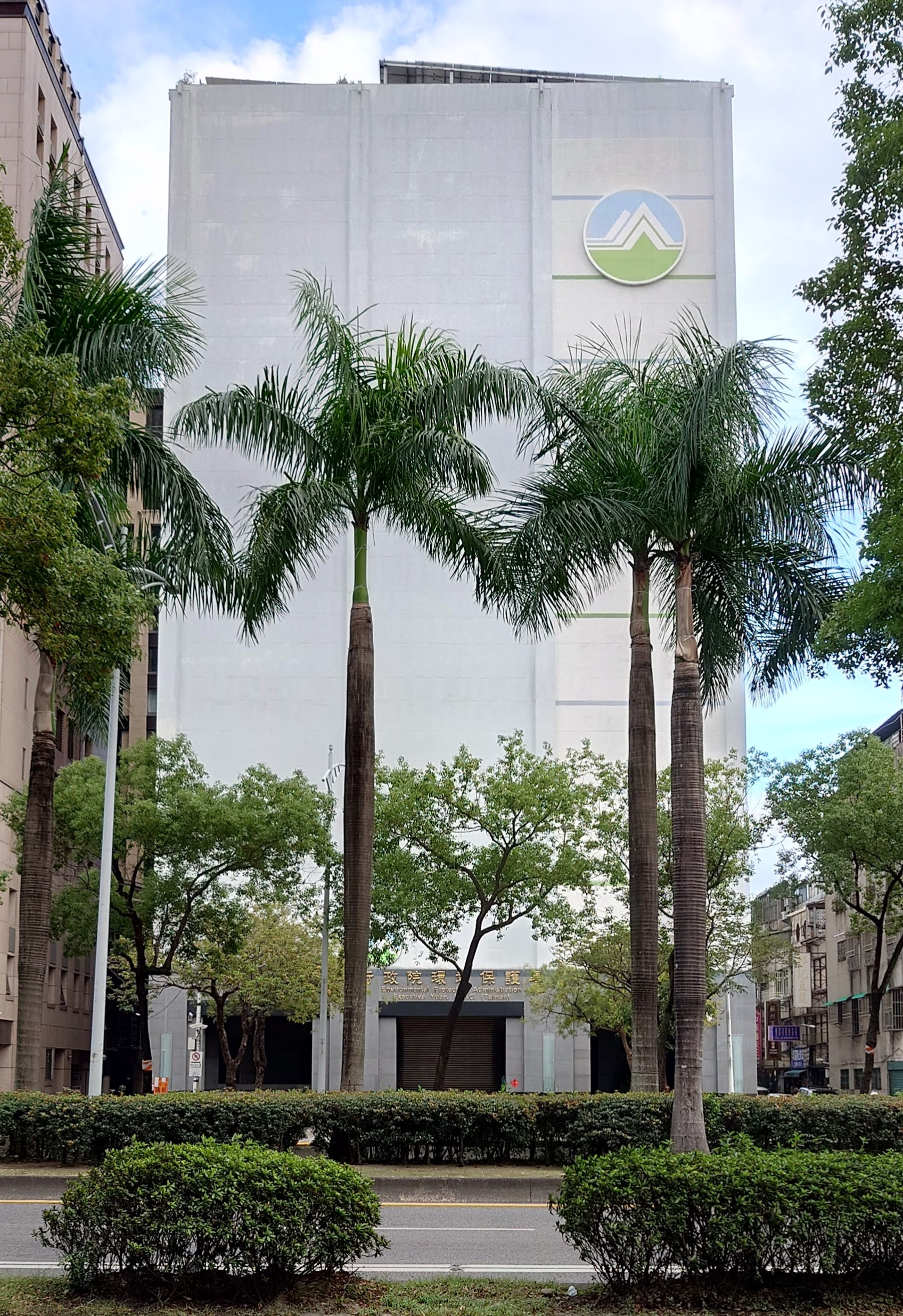

Agency overview
- Formed: March 1971 (as Department of Environmental Health); 22 August 1987 (as EPA)
- Jurisdiction: Taiwan
- Headquarters: Zhongzheng, Taipei
- Employees: 15,034 (est. 2004)
- Minister responsible: Peng Chi-ming, Minister
- Website: www.moenv.gov.tw

The Ministry of Environment (MOENV; Chinese: 環境部; Pe̍h-ōe-jī: Khoân-kéng Pō͘), formerly the Environmental Protection Administration, is a cabinet-level ministry responsible for protecting and conserving the environment in Taiwan. The ministry's scope includes air quality, noise control, monitoring and inspection of environment, solid waste, recycling, sustainable development and international cooperation.

It is led by the Minister for Environment, who is supported by two deputy ministers.

== History ==
The environmental protection agency has evolved and been part of different departments over decades. Prior to 1971, the environmental portfolio was part of the Ministry of Interior which encompasses the Health portfolio.

From March 1971 to 28 January 1982, the Department of Environmental Health was established to look after protecting the environment. Various agencies such as the Department of Health and others managed the soil and water aspects of environment.

From 29 January 1982 to 21 August 1987, the Environmental Protection Bureau was established to take over responsibility for noise and traffic control, air, water, waste management, health responsibilities under the Department of Health.

From 22 August 1987 to the 21 August 2023, the Environmental Protection Administration was established becoming the one stop shop for all environmental policies, regulation, standards and enforcement. It encompassed toxic substance management, environmental sanitation and monitoring and inspection of the environment.

In May 2023, the Legislative Yuan approved the proposal to upgrade the agency to a ministry named the Ministry of Environment.

== Organizational structure ==
The Ministry of Environment has 5 implementation units, 6 supplementary units, and other subordinate agencies.

=== Administrative agencies ===
- Climate Change Administration
- Resource Circulation Administration
- Chemicals Administration
- Environmental Management Administration

== List of ministers ==
Non-partisan/unknown Kuomintang (Nationalist) Democratic Progressive Party New Party

№	Name	Term of Office		Days	Political Party	Cabinet
Minister of the Environmental Protection Administration
1	Eugene Chien (簡又新)	22 August 1987	31 May 1991	1378	Kuomintang	Yu Kuo-hwa; Lee Huan; Hau Pei-tsun
2	Jaw Shaw-kong (趙少康)	1 June 1991	15 November 1992	533	Kuomintang	Hau Pei-tsun
—	Larry Chen (陳龍吉)	15 November 1992	20 November 1992	5	Kuomintang	Hau Pei-tsun
3	Chang Lung-cheng (張隆盛)	21 November 1992	9 June 1996	1296	Kuomintang	Hau Pei-tsun; Lien Chan
4	Tsai Hsun-hsiung (蔡勳雄)	10 June 1996	20 May 2000	1440	Kuomintang	Lien Chan; Vincent Siew
5	Edgar Lin (林俊義)	20 May 2000	6 March 2001	290	Democratic Progressive Party	Tang Fei; Chang Chun-hsiung I
6	Hau Lung-pin (郝龍斌)	7 March 2001	6 October 2003	949	New Party	Chang Chun-hsiung I Yu Shyi-kun
7	Chang Juu-en (張祖恩)	6 October 2003	25 April 2005	567		Yu Shyi-kun; Frank Hsieh
—	Tsay Ting-kuei (蔡丁貴)	25 April 2005	7 June 2005	43		Frank Hsieh
8	Chang Kow-lung (張國龍)	8 June 2005	20 May 2007	711		Frank Hsieh; Su Tseng-chang I
9	Winston Dang (陳重信)	21 May 2007	20 May 2008	365	Democratic Progressive Party	Chang Chun-hsiung II
10	Stephen Shen (沈世宏)	20 May 2008	2 March 2014	2112		Liu Chao-shiuan; Wu Den-yih; Sean Chen; Jiang Yi-huah
11	Wei Kuo-yen (魏國彥)	3 March 2014	19 May 2016	808	Kuomintang	Jiang Yi-huah; Mao Chi-kuo; Chang San-cheng
12	Lee Ying-yuan (李應元)	20 May 2016	3 December 2018	927	Democratic Progressive Party	Lin Chuan; William Lai
—	Tsai Hung-teh (蔡鴻德)	4 December 2018	14 January 2019	40		William Lai
13	Chang Tzi-chin (張子敬)	14 January 2019	21 August 2023	2763		Su Tseng-chang II; Chen Chien-jen
Minister of Environment (since 22 August 2023)
1	Shieu Fuh-Sheng (薛富盛)	22 August 2023	20 May 2024	272		Chen Chien-jen
2	Peng Chi-ming (彭啟明)	20 May 2024	Incumbent	810		Cho Jung-tai

== Transportation ==
The ministry building is accessible within walking distance South of Ximen MRT station of the Taipei Metro.

== See also ==
- Environmental issues in Taiwan
- Executive Yuan
- Demographics of Taiwan
- History of Taiwan
- Economy of Taiwan
