= Luo Wen-jia =

Taiwanese politician

- 羅文嘉
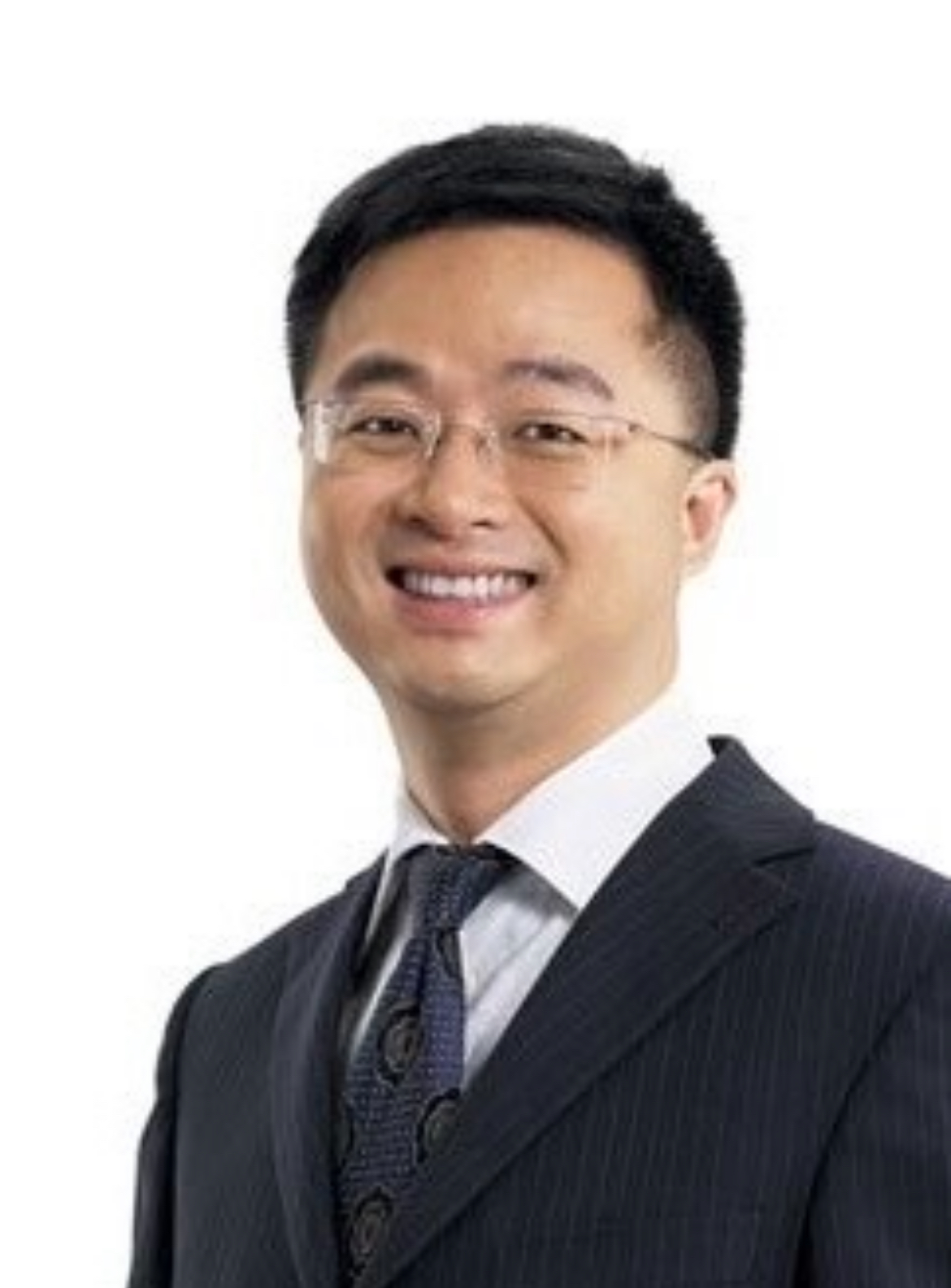
- Official portrait, 2012

Vice Chairman and Secretary-General of the Straits Exchange Foundation
- Incumbent
- Assumed office 7 June 2024 Serving with Rock Hsu
- Chairman: Cheng Wen-tsan; Rock Hsu (acting); Frank Wu; Rock Hsu (acting); Su Jia-chyuan
- Preceded by: Chiu Chui-cheng

22nd Secretary-General of the Democratic Progressive Party
- In office 16 January 2019 – 19 May 2020
- Chairman: Cho Jung-tai
- Preceded by: Hung Yao-fu
- Succeeded by: Lin Hsi-yao

3rd Minister of Hakka Affairs
- In office 20 May 2004 – March 2005
- Prime Minister: Yu Shyi-kun; Frank Hsieh
- Deputy: Lee Yung-te
- Preceded by: Yeh Chu-lan
- Succeeded by: Lee Yung-te

Member of the Legislative Yuan
- In office 1 February 2002 – 19 May 2004
- Constituency: Taipei I

Vice Minister of Cultural Affairs
- In office 20 May 2000 – 5 February 2001
- Minister: Tchen Yu-chiou
- Succeeded by: Wu Mi-cha

Personal details
- Born: 1 January 1966 (age 60) Xinwu, Taoyuan, Taiwan
- Party: Democratic Progressive Party
- Education: National Taiwan University (BA)

Luo Wen-jia (Chinese: 羅文嘉; pinyin: Luó Wénjiā; Hakka: Lò Vùn-kâ; born 1 January 1966) is a Taiwanese politician who is the current vice chairman and secretary-general of the Straits Exchange Foundation. He is a member of the Democratic Progressive Party.

Luo worked closely with Chen Shui-bian, first as Chen's legislative assistant, and later within Taipei City Government while Chen was mayor. When Chen was elected president in 2000, Luo joined the Executive Yuan as vice minister of the Council of Cultural Affairs. Between 2002 and 2004, Luo was a member of the Legislative Yuan. He left the legislature for an appointment as minister of the Council for Hakka Affairs, from which he stepped down in 2005 to run unsuccessfully for the Taipei County magistracy. Luo was subsequently defeated as a legislative candidate in 2008. Luo returned to politics in 2019, when he was named secretary-general of the Democratic Progressive Party.

== Education ==
Luo graduated from National Taiwan University with a bachelor's degree in political science.

== Political career ==
Luo is a member of the Democratic Progressive Party (DPP), and served as legislative assistant to Chen Shui-bian between 1991 and 1994. After Chen was elected mayor of Taipei, Luo became the city government spokesman in December 1994. He left Taipei City Government in October 1997. Luo then served as spokesman for Chen Shui-bian's 2000 presidential campaign and in the same role for the Democratic Progressive Party.

After Chen became the president of the Republic of China, Luo held the vice chairmanship of the Council for Cultural Affairs. In January 2001, Luo resigned the post to prepare a bid for legislative elections later that year. He became one of five Democratic Progressive Party candidates to contest a seat from Taipei 1. During the election, the party urged its supporters to vote for candidates based on identification card numbers. In the proposed vote allocation scheme, Luo split support with Lan Shih-tsung, and was to receive votes from supporters whose identification numbers ended in three or four. Luo won election to the Legislative Yuan in December 2001. He was subsequently appointed as the chair of the Council for Hakka Affairs in 2004. He stepped down in March 2005 to contest a primary for the magistracy of Taipei County. The office was won by Chou Hsi-wei. During the 2008 legislative election cycle, Luo ended a bid for a party list seat in favor of a district seat, which he lost.

In January 2019, Luo ended his political retirement of nine years and accepted an appointment as secretary-general of the Democratic Progressive Party.

== Political stances ==
In 2004, Luo, Chen Chi-mai, Lee Wen-chung and Tsai Huang-liang proposed New Culture Discourse, which argued that Taiwan was a multicultural society and that it should retain the Republic of China as the official name. Luo and Tuan Yi-kang launched the new DPP movement for party reform in 2005. Chen Shui-bian advised against the name, drawing parallels to the New Kuomintang Alliance, which later became the New Party.

== Personal life ==
Luo is married to Liu Chao-yi.
