= 2006 Democratic Progressive Party chairmanship election =

Election in Taiwan

- January 15, 2006
- Turnout: 19.96%
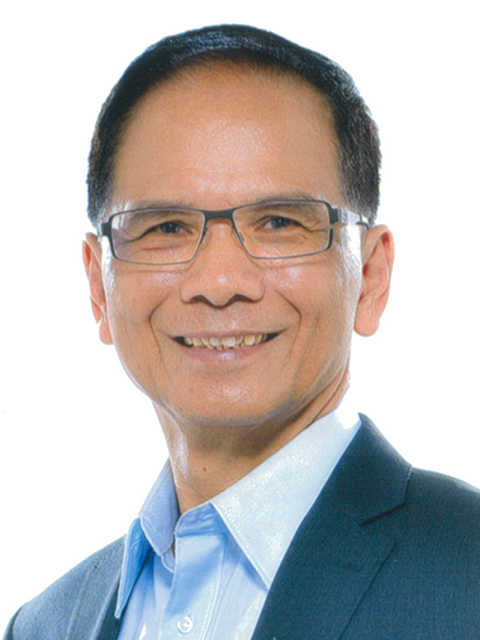

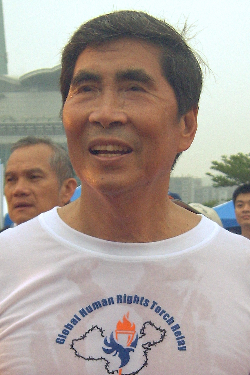

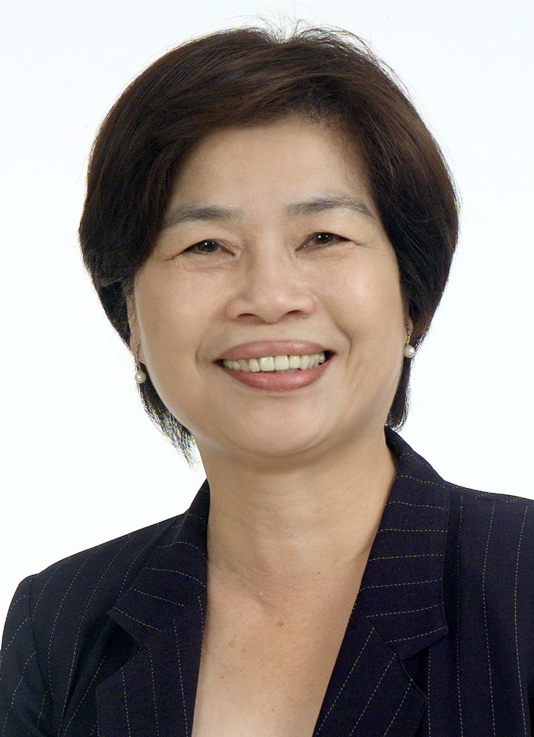
Candidate	Yu Shyi-kun	Chai Trong-rong	Wong Chin-chu
Popular vote	25,397	16,846	4,406
Percentage	54.4%	36.1%	9.4%
Chaiperson before election
Su Tseng-chang
Elected Chaiperson
Yu Shyi-kun

The 2006 Democratic Progressive Party chairmanship by-election was held on January 15, 2006 in Taiwan. It was the tenth chairmanship election conducted by the party. In December 2005, chairperson Su Tseng-chang resigned as a result of failing to win ten of the twenty-three positions in the 2005 local elections.

== Candidates ==
There were many hopefuls that publicly expressed their desire for the chairmanship. These politicians withdrew after acting chairperson Annette Lu withdrew her campaign. Only three candidates formally announced their bids for chairperson:

- Chai Trong-rong, former president of the WUFI, former legislator, and former chairperson of Formosa Television, was the first to register candidacy. He was supported by the Welfare State Alliance, which was led by Frank Hsieh, along with foreign minister Mark Chen and vice president Annette Lu.
- Yu Shyi-kun, former Presidential Office secretary-general, former magistrate of Yilan County, and former premier, officially launched his campaign on December 18. He was endorsed by the Justice Alliance, which included President Chen Shui-bian.
- Wong Chin-chu, former legislator and former magistrate of Changhua County, was the last to register. Wong Chin-chu, who left the New Tide faction, was not supported by any of the factions, but was endorsed by former chairperson Lin Yi-hsiung.

== Results ==
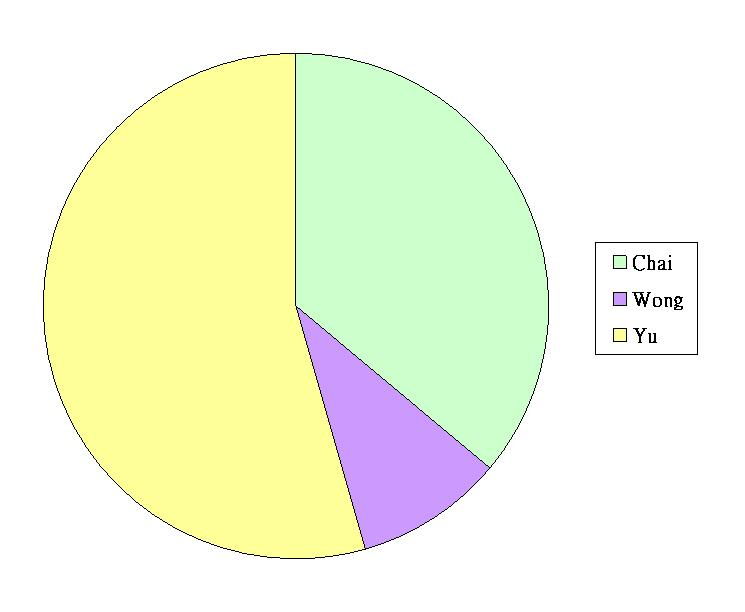
Graphical depiction of the results

Yu won the race with over 54% of the votes. However, the voter turnout was only 19.96%, the lowest turnout in the party's history. This was significantly different from the 2005 Kuomintang election, which had a voter turnout of 50.17%.

It is commonly believed that Yu's successful campaign symbolized the fact that President Chen Shui-bian's Justice Alliance was still in power within the party. After Su Tseng-chang, also a member of the Justice Alliance, was appointed the premier, his term was relatively more stable as a result of the mutual cooperation between the three leaders.

On the other hand, former chairperson Lin Yi-hsiung left the party as a result of the loss of Wong Chin-chu.

Candidate	Total votes cast	Percentage of vote
Yu Shyi-kun (W)	25,397	54.4%
Chai Trong-rong	16,846	36.1%
Wong Chin-chu	4,406	9.4%
Voter turnout	19.96%	

== See also ==
- 2005 Kuomintang chairmanship election
