= 2011 Democratic Progressive Party presidential primary =

- 25–26 April 2011
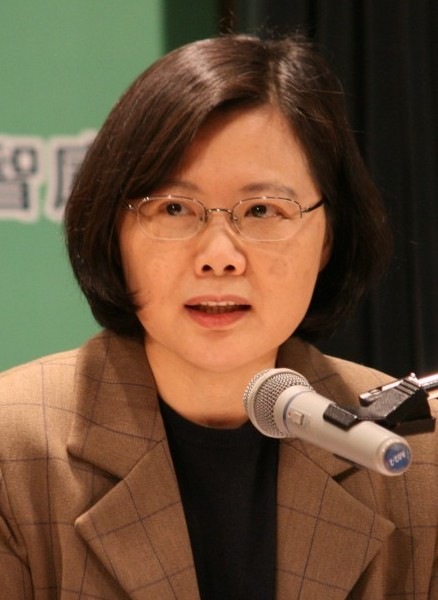

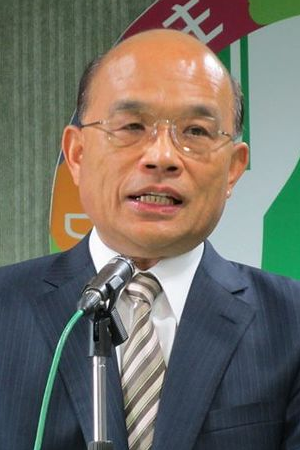

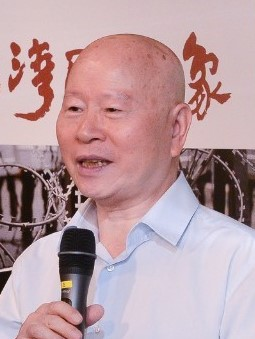
Candidate	Tsai Ing-wen	Su Tseng-chang	Hsu Hsin-liang
Percentage	42.50%	41.15%	12.21%
Nominee before election
Hsieh Chang-ting
Nominee chosen
Tsai Ing-wen

The 2011 Democratic Progressive Party presidential primary was the selection process by which the Democratic Progressive Party of the Republic of China (Taiwan) chose its candidate for the 2012 presidential election. The DPP candidate for president was selected through a series of nationwide opinion polls held on 25–26 April 2011.

== Timing ==
Primary registration was held between 21 and 25 March. Four TV presentations were held on April 9, 13, 16 and 20 where the candidates outlined their visions and answered questions from experts and citizens. Unlike the practice in other countries, no actual debate was held. Opinion polling will be between 25 and 29 April and the primary is expected to wrap up on May 4.

== Candidates ==
Former Vice President Annette Lu Hsiu-lien formally announced her candidacy on February 28, 2011, the 64th anniversary of February 28 Incident. She withdrew her candidacy on 22 March. It is unclear whether she would quit the party and run as an independent.

Chairwoman Tsai Ing-wen announced her candidacy on 11 March. Tsai is supported by former president Chen Shui-bian, former premiers Frank Hsieh Chang-ting and Yu Shyi-kun plus various pro-independence groups.

Former premier Su Tseng-chang officially announced his candidacy a few hours after Lu withdrew on 22 March.

Former DPP chairman Hsu Hsin-liang is also running. Hsu ran unsuccessfully for the president in 1996 and 2000. He advocates "advance boldly to the west" (大膽西進) and wants to maximise Chinese capital, students and tourists coming to Taiwan.

== Opinion polls ==
The DPP primary is carried out in the form of opinion polls. Opinion polls are of the "comparative" form, where polled persons would be asked who would they support if the candidates were incumbent President Ma Ying-jeou and Tsai; if the candidates were Ma and Su; or if the candidates were Ma and Hsu. The polling was performed by five companies each calling 3,000 people. The population consists of 4.27 million telephone numbers that are at least one year old. The chance of getting polled is around one in three hundred.

Candidates who poll below Ma would be eliminated and the remaining candidates with the highest rating would be nominated. If all candidates rate below Ma, the person with the highest rating would be nominated. In the event of a tie, the winner would be the person who either defeated Ma by the most or trailed him by the least based on the gap between the candidates’ ratings and Ma's.

The form of polling caused some controversy. If someone say they prefer all three DPP candidates over Ma, it would cancel out have no effect on the outcome. "The goal of the primaries is to choose one from three. If voters support all three candidates, it defeats the purpose of the poll", Frank Hsieh Chang-ting was quoted as saying.

Some fans of Tsai therefore called on her supporters to only support Tsai in the polls, and tell the pollster they prefer Ma when asked about the other two candidates. Members of the Su camp were furious about this, calling it a "dirty trick" (詐術). Tsai distanced herself from this, telling her supporters to campaign positively.

Also, there is concern KMT supporters would skew the results by deliberately supporting a weaker candidate like Su when polled.

On the first day of the official polls, DPP member Yang Hui-ju (楊蕙如) disclosed some survey numbers on her microblogging site. She claimed Tsai's campaign spokesperson Juan Chao-hsiung (阮昭雄) was the source. Juan denied on the next day and Yang publicly apologized for her behavior.

== Tsai's sexual orientation ==
Tsai is a 54-year-old unmarried woman with no known boyfriend. Former DPP chairman Shih Ming-teh called for her to "proudly come out of the closet" like Iceland Prime Minister Jóhanna Sigurðardóttir in order to make Taiwan more progressive. Shih said that under Taiwan laws, only the opposite-sex spouse of the President is regulated and there would be no way to monitor if the same-sex partner of Tsai is taking bribes. Shih's comments were strongly criticized by both KMT and DPP politicians, women's groups and gay rights groups. Tsai said she is not angry at Shih, but she would not respond to him, because to do so would make her "an accomplice of gender oppression". Tsai said she would strive to eliminate gender oppression in Taiwan and lead the country toward a pluralistic, inclusive society that respects human rights.

== Result ==
Pollster	DPP		Spotting		MSRC		ADSRC		ERA		Average	
Candidate	DPP	KMT	DPP	KMT	DPP	KMT	DPP	KMT	DPP	KMT	DPP	KMT
Tsai	41.16%	36.23%	43.35%	33.45%	43.11%	33.81%	42.93%	35.87%	41.97%	35.86%	42.50%	35.04%
Su	42.42%	33.23%	41.06%	32.58%	40.87%	33.44%	42.00%	34.49%	39.41%	35.22%	41.15%	33.79%
Hsu	11.70%	52.44%	12.92%	49.08%	11.58%	51.18%	13.63%	51.99%	11.20%	52.54%	12.21%	51.45%
