= Chen Shih-meng =

Taiwanese politician

- 陳師孟
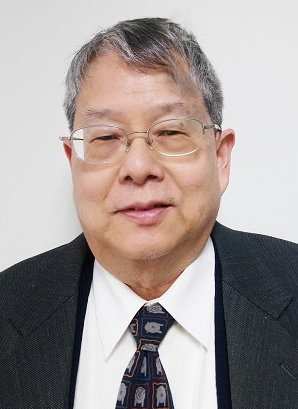

Member of the Control Yuan
- In office 29 January 2018 – 31 January 2020

Secretary-General to the President
- In office 1 September 2002 – 6 February 2003
- Preceded by: Yu Shyi-kun
- Succeeded by: Chiou I-jen

Secretary General of the Democratic Progressive Party
- In office February 1992 – September 1992
- Preceded by: Chang Chun-hung
- Succeeded by: Chiang Peng-chien

Personal details
- Born: August 4, 1948 (age 78) Takoma Park, Maryland, U.S.
- Party: Independent
- Other political affiliations: Democratic Progressive Party
- Education: National Taiwan University (BA); Ohio State University (PhD)
- Profession: Economist

Chinese name
- Traditional Chinese: 陳師孟
- Simplified Chinese: 陈师孟
Transcriptions
Standard Mandarin
- Hanyu Pinyin: Chén Shīmèng

Chen Shih-meng (Chinese: 陳師孟; pinyin: Chén Shīmèng; born 4 August 1948) is a Taiwanese economist and politician. Chen supports the independence of Taiwan.

== Early life and education ==
Chen was born in the United States in Takoma Park, Maryland, on August 4, 1948. His father was Chen Chi, a Taiwanese agronomist. His grandfather, Chen Bulei, was a Kuomintang official in the Nationalist government.

In 1970, Chen graduated from National Taiwan University with a Bachelor of Arts in economics. He then pursued doctoral studies in the U.S., earning a Master of Arts in economics in 1975 and a Ph.D. in economics in 1978 from Ohio State University. His doctoral dissertation, completed under economist Edward Kane, was titled, "Theory of quantity-setting firm and risk aversion: a certainty-equivalent approach".

== Political career ==
Chen joined the Kuomintang in 1966 and quit the party in 1991 to join the Democratic Progressive Party. On 8 September 1991, Chen cofounded the 100 Action League, which called for revisions to the Article 100 of the Criminal Code. In 1992, Chen joined the Goa-Seng-Lang Association For Taiwan Independence. He was Secretary General of the Democratic Progressive Party in February 1992, and held that office until September 1992.

Chen once served as vice mayor of Taipei, while Chen Shui-bian was its mayor. He became the Vice-President of the Central Bank of the Republic of China in 2000. In 2002 he became Secretary General of the Office of the President of the Republic of China, a position he held until 2003. From 2003 to 2004, he was President of Ketagalan Institute. He then taught at National Taiwan University. In March 2017, Chen was nominated to the Control Yuan. He was confirmed in 2018, and took office on 29 January 2018. Chen resigned from the Control Yuan on 16 January 2020, stating that he was unable to advocate for reform of the body during his tenure. His resignation took effect on 31 January 2020.

Party political offices
Preceded by Chang Chun-hung	Secretary General of the Democratic Progressive Party; 1992–1992	Succeeded by Chiang Peng-chien
Government offices
Preceded by Yu Shyi-kun	Secretary-General to the President; 2002–2003	Succeeded by Chiou I-jen
