= New Tide faction =

Faction of the Democratic Progressive Party in Taiwan

New Tide faction 新潮流系
- Leader: Lai Ching-te
- Dissolved: 2006 (de jure)
- Ideology: Taiwanese nationalism; Progressivism (Taiwanese); Anti-communism; Anti-imperialism; Historical, now factions: Social democracy; Left-wing populism; Taiwanese independence
- Political position: Left-wing
- Type: Democratic Progressive Party faction

The New Tide faction (Chinese: 新潮流系; pinyin: Xīn Cháoliú xì; Wade–Giles: Hsin Ch'ao-liu hsi) was the largest faction of the Democratic Progressive Party (DPP) in Taiwan before the party voted to dissolve all factions in 2006. Though dissolved, it remains the largest faction in the DPP.

The faction initially advocated social democracy, attempting to work with other labor and social movements to influence public policy. The faction also advocated the use of group action to resist the influence of elected officials in the Tangwai and DPP (many early New Tide members entered politics via Tangwai publications and social movements rather than electoral politics, as a result, most were not elected officials). The faction initially appeared in the form of "domestic Taiwan independence activists" (in contrast to Taiwan independence activists operating from abroad) It pushed the DPP to include Taiwan independence in the party charter, to boost their position against the more moderate factions, as well as against World United Formosans for Independence members returning from exile.

== History ==
=== Establishment ===
The New Tide faction was initially composed of editorial members of "The Movement" (Chinese: 新潮流) magazine established in 1984. Important members of the time included Chiou I-jen, Wu Nai-ren, Hung Chi-chang, Lin Cho-shui, Liu Shou-ch'eng. Members who would later leave the party included Sisy Chen. The early positions of the faction included Taiwan independence, group action, and social democracy. In later years the faction moderated its position and emphasized pragmatism more. With a clear political manifesto and strong factional discipline, the New Tide became one of the most powerful factions in the DPP.

=== Growth ===
The New Tide was known for being the DPP faction most adept at developing new talent. New DPP party members from other factions interested in entering the political arena would often start their careers as aides attached to an established political figure. However, novices in such positions often lacked the opportunity for training and promotion. In contrast, aides to New Tide affiliated legislators often enjoyed more opportunities provided by the faction, including funding for study abroad, as well as assistance in moving up the organizational hierarchy. The New Tide's early platform of social democracy also gave it an edge over other DPP factions which had no formal platform other than being anti-Kuomintang (KMT).

As the New Tide lacked well known political names at the national level, the faction utilized its strong organization to alternatively threaten or cajole DPP members aspiring to higher office into alliances or cooperation. Regardless of whether or not they were at odds with the New Tide when running for chairmanship, successive DPP chairmen often appointed large numbers of New Tide members to the positions of party secretary-general or party manager, resulting in a mutually beneficial relationship with the New Tide. The New Tide's long term cooperation with Chen Shui-bian proved to be a particularly worthwhile investment. After Chen's election to the presidency in 2000 and the transformation of the DPP into the ruling party, New Tide members were appointed to even more important positions. This allowed faction members in the party apparatus to cultivate even more new talent. However, to ensure its own survival, influence, and future growth, the New Tide was often quick to distance itself from any misstep by President Chen or the DPP as a whole, sometimes going as far as publicly issuing critical statements to distance themselves as damage control. As a result, this quickly drew the ire of other DPP factions, who saw New Tide members as being opportunists interested only in furthering their own power by grabbing the most resources and party positions, while being unwilling to share the fortunes of the party as a whole.

In the party primaries running up to the 2008 ROC Presidential Elections, the New Tide threw its support behind Su Tseng-chang, with whom New Tide faction elder Lu Hsiu-yi had a strong working relationship.

In December 2005, former New Tide member Wong Chin-chu announced her intention to run for DPP chairman, after encouragement from Lin Yi-hsiung. Then New Tide faction convener Tuan Yi-kang resigned his position for "dereliction of duty", as Wong had not first informed the New Tide of her intentions. His position was succeeded by Hung Chi-chang, followed by William Lai.

=== Dissolution ===
On 23 July 2006, Legislator Wang Sing-nan proposed a motion before the DPP's 12th National Party Congress to "disband all factions". The motion passed with a majority of the vote. Aside from forbidding the establishment of offices, recruitment, and fundraising in the name of a faction, the motion also forbade party members from joining a faction. The New Tide announced that it would accept and comply with the new directives, and disbanded itself, and its associated groups the same day. Future media reports would refer to them as "ex-New Tide faction". The former New Tide faction remains dominant in the DPP.
