= Zhang Junhong =

Zhang Junhong may refer to:

- Chang Chun-hung (Chinese: 張俊宏; pinyin: Zhāng Jùnhóng, born 1938), Taiwanese politician
- Cheong Jun Hoong (Chinese: 張俊虹; pinyin: Zhāng Jùnhóng, born 1990), Malaysian diver
