= Wang Zhengxu =

People named Wang Zhengxu may refer to:

- Zhengxu Wang (王正绪), Chinese professor of Fudan University
- Wang Cheng-hsu (王正旭; born 1956), Taiwanese hematologist, oncologist, and politician
