= List of secretaries-general of the Democratic Progressive Party =

Secretary-General of Democratic Progressive Party
- 民主進步黨秘書長
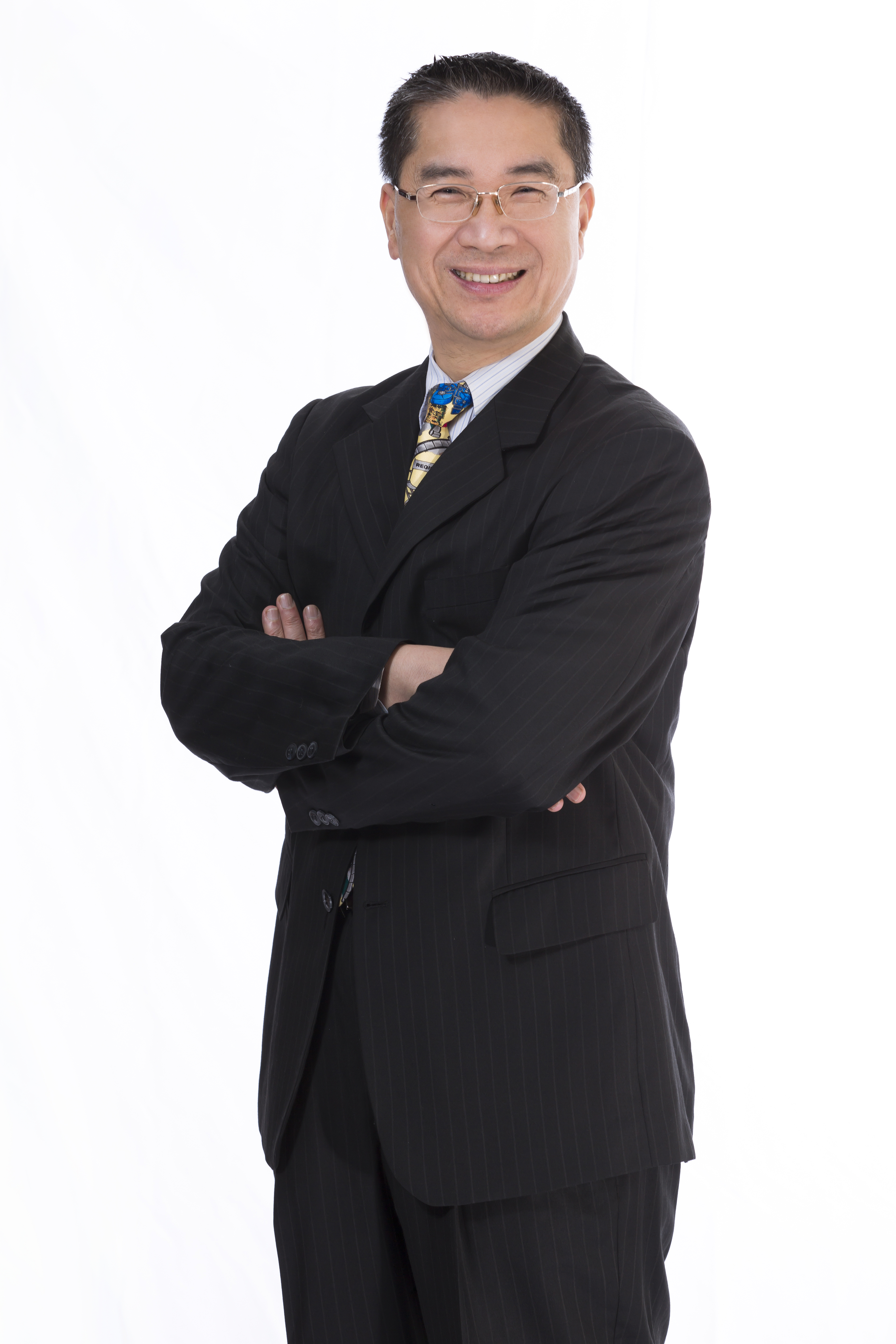
- Incumbent; Hsu Kuo-yung since 25 August 2025
- Status: Party secretary-general
- Appointer: Chairperson
- Formation: 28 November 1986
- First holder: Huang Erh-hsuan
- Deputy: Deputy secretaries-general
- Website: www.dpp.org.tw

The Secretary-General of the Democratic Progressive Party is the second-highest ranked position of the Democratic Progressive Party (DPP). The incumbent secretary-general is Ho Po-wen, acting since 30 July 2025. The following is a list of people who held the office of secretaries-general of the Democratic Progressive Party (Taiwan).

== List of secretaries-general ==
1. Huang Erh-hsuan (28 November 1986 – 28 November 1988)
2. Chang Chun-hung (28 November 1988 – April 1992)
3. Chen Shih-meng (April 1992– September 1992)
4. Chiang Peng-chien (September 1992 – December 1993)
5. Su Tseng-chang (December 1993 – July 1995)
6. Chiou I-jen (July 1995 – December 1998)
7. Yu Shyi-kun (25 December 1998 – 20 May 2000)
8. Wu Nai-ren (20 May 2000 – 20 March 2002)
9. Chang Chun-hsiung (20 March 2002 – 31 January 2005)
10. Lee I-yang (1 February 2005 – 25 January 2006)
11. Lin Chia-lung (25 January 2006 – 15 October 2007)
12. Cho Jung-tai (15 October 2007 – 15 January 2008)
13. Lee Ying-yuan (15 January 2008 – 20 May 2008)
14. Wang Tuoh (20 May 2008 – 20 May 2009)
15. Wu Nai-ren (20 May 2009 – 20 December 2009)
16. Su Jia-chyuan (20 December 2009 – 20 May 2010)
17. Wu Nai-ren (20 May 2010 – 20 December 2010)
18. Su Jia-chyuan (20 December 2010 – 6 June 2012)
19. Lin Hsi-yao (6 June 2012 – 28 May 2014)
20. Joseph Wu (28 May 2014 – 24 May 2016)
21. Hung Yao-fu (25 May 2016 – November 2018)
22. Hsu Chia-ching (24 November 2018 – 13 January 2019)
23. Luo Wen-jia (13 January 2019 – 19 May 2020)
24. Lin Hsi-yao (20 May 2020 – 26 November 2022)
25. Sidney Lin (26 November 2022 – 18 January 2023)
26. Hsu Li-ming (18 January 2023 – 17 January 2024)
27. Andrea Yang (17 January 2024 – 5 June 2024)
28. Lin Yu-chang (5 June 2024 – 27 July 2025)
29. Ho Po-wen (30 June 2025 – 25 August 2025)
30. Hsu Kuo-yung (25 August 2025 – Incumbent)

== See also ==
- List of leaders of the Democratic Progressive Party
- List of leaders of the Kuomintang
- List of secretaries-general of the Kuomintang
