= Chairman of the Democratic Progressive Party =

Chairperson of Democratic Progressive Party
- 民主進步黨主席
- Party emblem

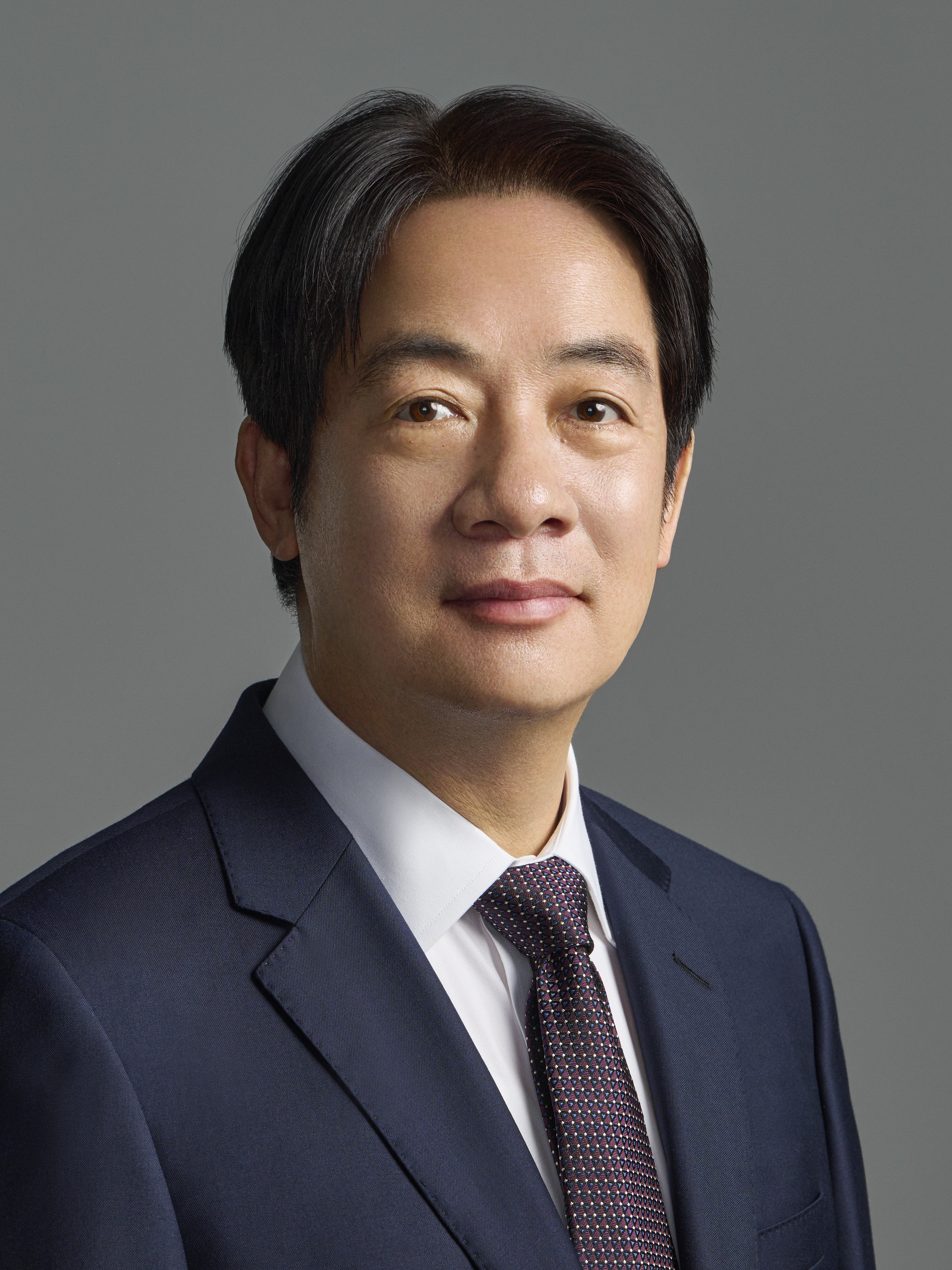
- Incumbent; Lai Ching-te since 18 January 2023
- Status: Head of party
- Seat: Taipei
- Nominator: Political parties
- Appointer: Direct party member vote (as Opposition Party) President assumes position (as Ruling Party)
- Term length: Two years, renewable once
- Formation: 28 November 1986
- First holder: Chiang Peng-chien
- Salary: $1.5 million TWD annually
- Website: www.dpp.org.tw

The chairperson of the Democratic Progressive Party is the leader of the Democratic Progressive Party (DPP). The incumbent chairman is Lai Ching-te, elected in January 2023.

== Chairmanship ==
In the early days of the DPP, the tenure of chairman was only one year. It was extended to two years in around 1990.

After amendments to the constitution of the DPP in 2000, the incumbent President of the Republic of China, if a member of the Party, shall be the chairperson of the DPP upon assuming office and until the end of their tenure as President. When in opposition, the chairman shall be directly elected by members of the DPP with a two-year term of office, renewable once.

When vacancy of chairmanship occurs and that the remaining term of office is within a year, the Central Committee shall elect a new chair amongst themselves. Otherwise, a by-election shall be held for party members to elect a successor.

== List ==
denotes interim chairman

No.	Portrait	Name	Term of office		Mandate	Party session	Notes
1		Chiang Peng-chien	28 November 1986	20 December 1987	1986 (unopposed)	1st	
2		Yao Chia-wen	20 December 1987	30 October 1988	1987	2nd	
3		Huang Hsin-chieh	30 October 1988	20 January 1992	1988	3rd	
3		Huang Hsin-chieh	30 October 1988	20 January 1992	1990	4th	
4		Hsu Hsin-liang	20 January 1992	4 December 1993 (Resigned)	1992	5th	Resigned after 1993 local elections defeat
—		Shih Ming-teh	4 December 1993	18 July 1994		5th	
5		Shih Ming-teh	18 July 1994	23 March 1996 (Resigned)	1994	6th	Resigned after 1996 presidential election defeat
—		Chang Chun-hung	23 March 1996	18 July 1996		6th	
(4)		Hsu Hsin-liang	18 July 1996	18 July 1998	1996	7th	
6		Lin Yi-hsiung	18 July 1998	20 April 2000	1998; Lin Yi-hsiung – 58,560 (unopposed)	8th	
7		Frank Hsieh; Chang-ting	20 April 2000	21 July 2002	2000; Frank Hsieh – 53,510 (unopposed)	9th	
8		Chen Shui-bian	21 July 2002	11 December 2004 (Resigned)	President as Party Chair	10th	Resigned after 2004 legislative election defeat
8		Chen Shui-bian	21 July 2002	11 December 2004 (Resigned)	President as Party Chair	11th	Resigned after 2004 legislative election defeat
—		Ker Chien-ming	11 December 2004	15 January 2005		11th	
9		Su Tseng-chang	15 January 2005	3 December 2005 (Resigned)	2005; Su Tseng-chang – 68,406 (unopposed)	11th	Resigned after 2005 local elections defeat
—		Annette Lü; Hsiu-lien (Interim)	3 December 2005	15 January 2006		11th	
10		Yu Shyi-kun (Resigned)	15 January 2006	21 September 2007	2006	12th	Resigned amid corruption charges
—		Chai Trong-rong	21 September 2007	15 October 2007		12th	
(8)		Chen Shui-bian	15 October 2007	12 January 2008 (Resigned)	President as Party Chair	12th	Resigned after 2008 legislative election defeat
—		Frank Hsieh; Chang-ting	12 January 2008	20 May 2008		12th	
11		Tsai Ing-wen	20 May 2008	17 March 2011 (Temporary leave)	2008	13th	Temporary leave of chairwomanship to focus on 2011 presidential party primary.
11		Tsai Ing-wen	20 May 2008	17 March 2011 (Temporary leave)	2010; Tsai Ing-wen – 78,192; You Ching – 8,406	14th	Temporary leave of chairwomanship to focus on 2011 presidential party primary.
—		Ker Chien-ming (Interim)	17 March 2011	27 April 2011		14th	
(11)		Tsai Ing-wen	27 April 2011	29 February 2012 (Resigned)	Resumes chair	14th	Resigned after 2012 presidential and legislative elections defeat
—		Chen Chu	29 February 2012	30 May 2012		14th	
(9)		Su Tseng-chang	30 May 2012	28 May 2014	2012; Su Tseng-chang – 55,894; Su Huan-chih – 23,281; Wu Rong-i – 16,315; Chai Trong-rong – 12,497; Hsu Hsin-liang – 2,763	15th	
(11)		Tsai Ing-wen	28 May 2014	24 November 2018 (Resigned)	2014; Tsai Ing-wen – 85,410; Kuo Tai-ling – 5,734	16th	Resigned after 2018 local elections defeat
(11)		Tsai Ing-wen	28 May 2014	24 November 2018 (Resigned)	President as Party Chair	17th	Resigned after 2018 local elections defeat
(11)		Tsai Ing-wen	28 May 2014	24 November 2018 (Resigned)	President as Party Chair	18th	Resigned after 2018 local elections defeat
—		Lin Yu-chang	28 November 2018	9 January 2019	Nominated by Central Committee	18th	
12		Cho Jung-tai	9 January 2019	20 May 2020	2019; Cho Jung-tai – 24,699; Michael You Ying-lung – 9,323	18th	
(11)		Tsai Ing-wen	20 May 2020	26 November 2022 (Resigned)	President as Party Chair	19th	Resigned after 2022 local elections defeat
(11)		Tsai Ing-wen	20 May 2020	26 November 2022 (Resigned)	President as Party Chair	20th	
—		Chen Chi-mai	30 November 2022	18 January 2023	Nominated by Central Committee	20th	
13		William Lai; Ching-te	18 January 2023	Incumbent	2023	20th	

== See also ==
- List of secretaries-general of the Democratic Progressive Party
- List of leaders of the Kuomintang
- List of secretaries-general of the Kuomintang
