= Huang Erh-hsuan =

Taiwanese political scientist and politician (1936–2019)

Huang Erh-hsuan MLY
- 黃爾璇
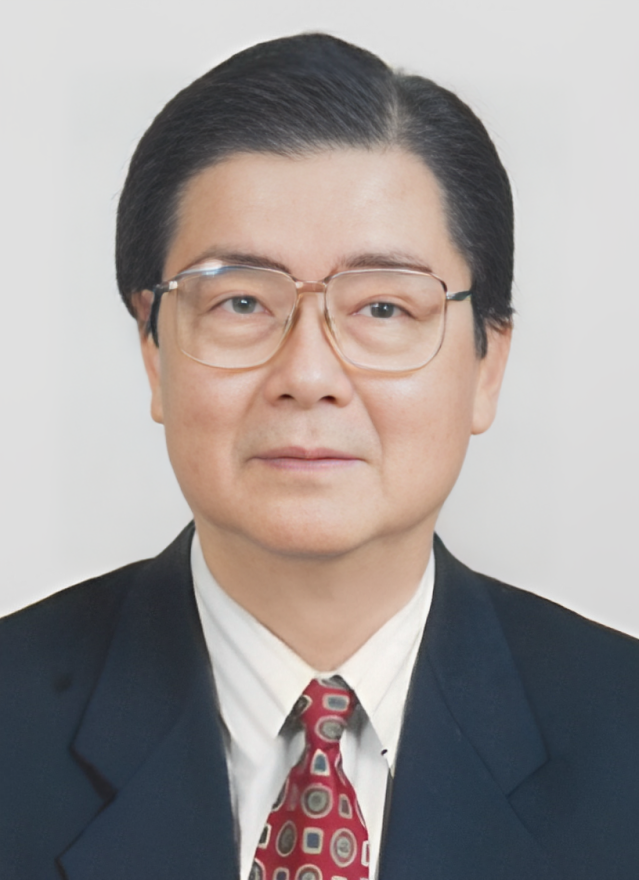

National Policy Advisor to the President
- In office 20 May 2016 – 9 February 2019
- President: Tsai Ing-wen

Member of the Legislative Yuan
- In office 1 February 1993 – 31 January 2002
- Constituency: Republic of China

Secretary-General of the Democratic Progressive Party
- In office 28 November 1986 – 28 November 1988
- Preceded by: Position established
- Succeeded by: Chang Chun-hung

Personal details
- Born: 5 March 1936 Tainan Prefecture, Taiwan, Empire of Japan
- Died: 9 February 2019 (aged 82) Xindian, New Taipei, Taiwan
- Party: Democratic Progressive Party (since 1986)
- Education: National Taiwan Normal University (BA, MEd); National Chengchi University (MPA, PhD)

Huang Erh-hsuan (Chinese: 黃爾璇; 5 March 1936 – 9 February 2019) was a Taiwanese political scientist and politician. He served in the Legislative Yuan from 1993 to 2002.

== Education and early career ==
Huang graduated from National Taiwan Normal University with a bachelor's degree and a master's degree in education. He then obtained a Master of Public Administration (M.P.A.) from National Chengchi University (NCCU) and earned his Ph.D. in political science from the university. His doctoral dissertation was titled, "A Study on Japan's Administrative Development" (Chinese: 日本行政發展之研究).

Huang later taught at NCCU, Soochow University and National Chung Hsing University. Huang wrote for the Independence Evening Post and published CommonWealth Magazine.

== Political career ==
Huang was a member of the Democratic Progressive Party's New Tide faction, and was the party's first secretary general between 1986 and 1988. He was elected to three terms on the Legislative Yuan via party list proportional representation from 1993 to 2002. Upon stepping down from the legislature, Huang was named the president of a Pan-Green Internet radio station hosted at TaiwaneseVoice.net.

== Death ==
Huang died of heart failure on 9 February 2019, aged 82. Following his death, the Transitional Justice Commission probed Huang's 1983 firing from Soochow University. The agency concluded in April 2019 that the departure of Huang from Soochow was a result of political persecution from Ministry of Education and intelligence agencies in Taiwan.
