= David Hou =

Taiwanese politician (born 1943)

David Hou or Hou Hai-hsiung (Chinese: 侯海熊; born 1943) is a Taiwanese politician.

Hou was elected to the Legislative Yuan in 1992 via party list proportional representation, as a member of the Democratic Progressive Party, and assumed office on 1 February 1993. He became the first sitting lawmaker affiliated with the DPP to be expelled from the party, and was replaced as a legislator by Chiang Peng-chien.
