= Tsai Huang-liang =

Taiwanese politician

Tsai Huang-liang MLY
- 蔡煌瑯
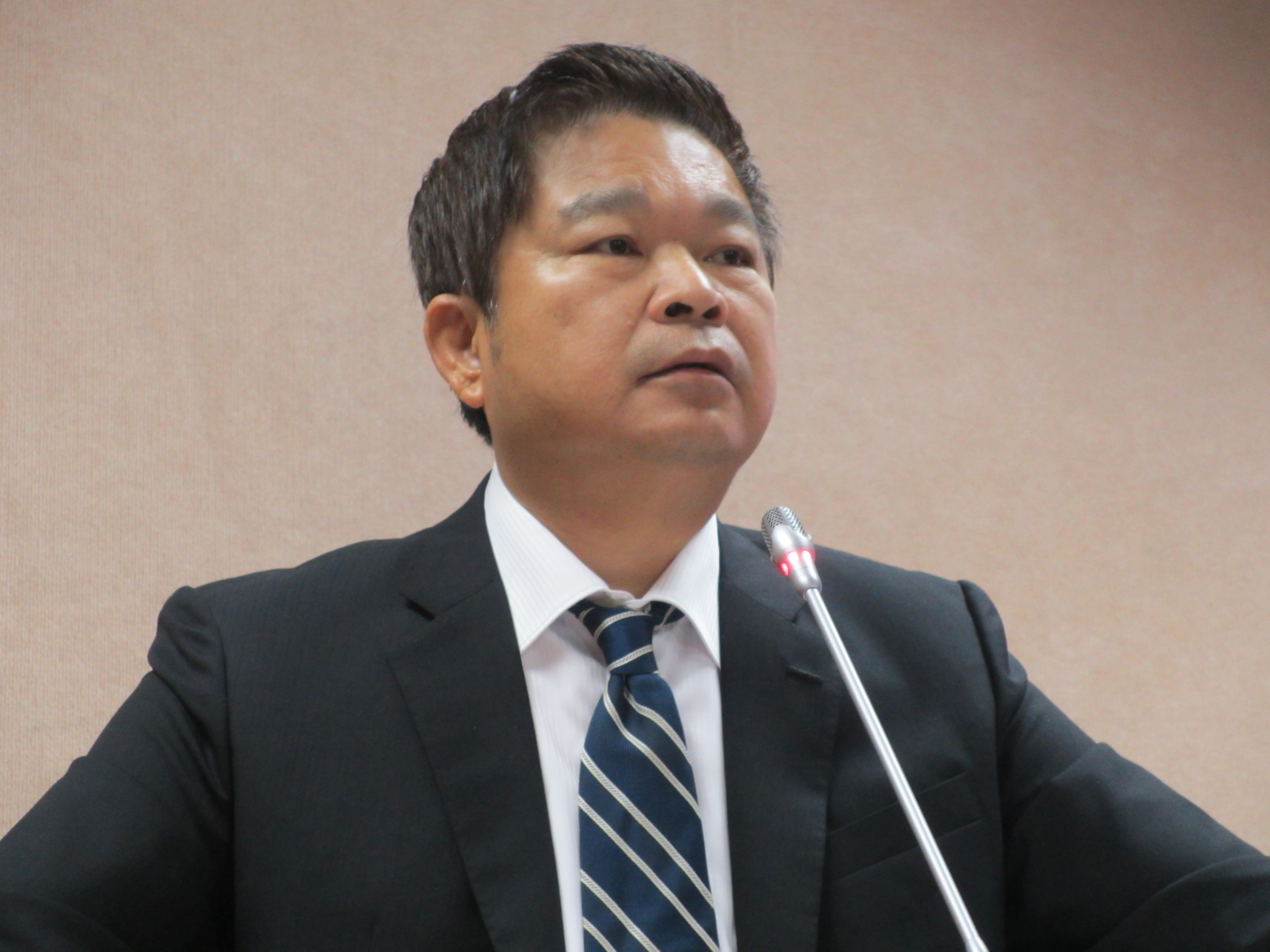
- Tsai in September 2014

Member of the Legislative Yuan
- In office 1 February 2005 – 31 January 2016
- Constituency: Republic of China
- In office 1 February 1996 – 31 January 2005
- Constituency: Nantou County

Personal details
- Born: 5 July 1960 (age 65) Puli, Nantou County, Taiwan
- Party: Democratic Progressive Party (since 1987)
- Education: Feng Chia University (BA); National Taiwan University (MBA)

Tsai Huang-liang Chinese: 蔡煌瑯; pinyin: Cài Huángláng; born 5 July 1960) is a Taiwanese politician.

== Early life and education ==
Tsai was born in 1960 to a family of farmers in Puli, Nantou. He graduated from Feng Chia University with a bachelor's degree in co-operative economics and then earned a Master of Business Administration (M.B.A.) degree from National Taiwan University.

== Political career ==
The Kaohsiung Incident occurred while Tsai served in the Republic of China Armed Forces. After his discharge from the military, Tsai advocated for the further democratization of Taiwan. He was elected to the Puli township council in 1984, and joined the Democratic Progressive Party in 1987 upon the lifting of martial law and assorted restrictions on opposition parties. Tsai was later elected to the Nantou County Council and worked for legislator Hsu Jung-shu before his 1995 election to the Legislative Yuan. Tsai had become the chief executive of the DPP caucus by 2001, rising to caucus whip by 2004. In 2005, Tsai briefly resigned from the legislature to run for Nantou County Magistrate. Starting in 2006, Tsai was the party's spokesman and deputy secretary general. As a legislator, Tsai participated in many discussions pertaining to national defense and has served on the Foreign Affairs and National Defense Committee. In 2010, Tsai aided a Taiwanese man in processing a relinquishment of Bolivian nationality, so he could pursue a military career. The next year, Tsai was one of many DPP politicians to openly accuse China of interfering in Taiwan's elections. After an influx of cheap hairy crabs to the Taiwanese market in 2012, Tsai led calls to investigate the quality of all imported hairy crabs. Later that year, Tsai criticized the United States for linking its beef imports to the Trade and Investment Framework Agreement discussions. In 2013, Tsai planned to contest the Nantou County magistracy for the second time, but later ended his campaign. As the 2014 Taiwan food scandal unfolded, Tsai berated the Ministry of Justice for ineffectiveness in handling related cases. In 2016, he was invited to serve on the New Southbound Policy committee.

== Political stances ==
Throughout his legislative tenure, Tsai has been concerned with the state of Cross-Strait relations, specifically the military threat of China, as well as the PRC's economic and diplomatic influence. Ma Ying-jeou and the China-friendly Kuomintang have been a frequent target of Tsai's criticism. Tsai has repeatedly asked the Ma Ying-jeou administration to protest China's military actions in the Taiwan Strait. After Su Tseng-chang became DPP chairman in 2012 and announced a softening of party policy toward China, Tsai chose to support the new stance.

He backs closer Japan–Taiwan relations.

== Controversy ==
The Taiwan High Court found Tsai guilty of bribery in 2011, after eight years of legal action. Upon retrial, Tsai was determined to be innocent of the charges. After further appeals, the Supreme Court upheld the High Court's not guilty ruling in 2016.
