= Chiou I-jen =

Taiwanese politician

- 邱義仁
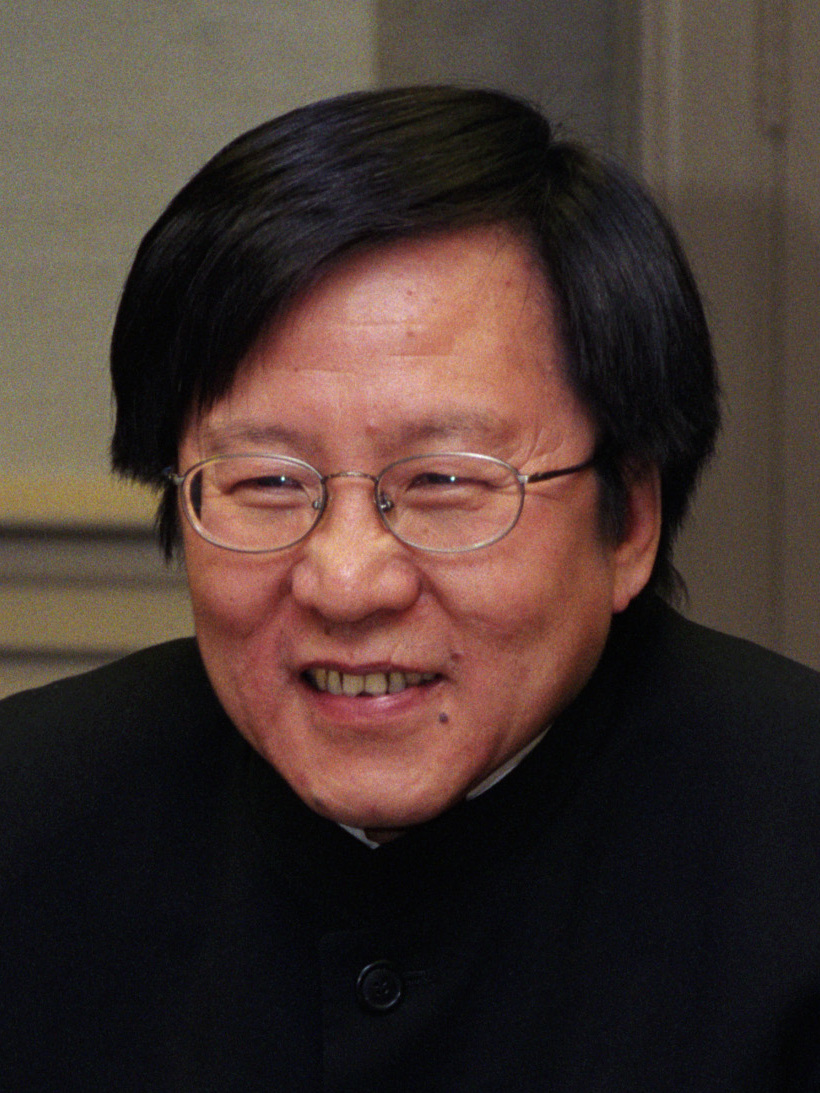
- Chen in 2003

Senior Advisor to the President
- In office November 2022 – May 2024
- President: Tsai Ing-wen

1st Chairman of Taiwan–Japan Relations Association
- In office 27 May 2016 – 26 May 2022
- MOFA Minister: David Lee; Joseph Wu
- Preceded by: Lee Jia-chin (as East Asia Relations Association)
- Succeeded by: Su Jia-chyuan

27th Vice Premier of the Republic of China
- In office 21 May 2007 – 6 May 2008
- Prime Minister: Chang Chun-hsiung
- Preceded by: Tsai Ing-wen
- Succeeded by: Chang Chun-hsiung (acting)

20th & 24th Secretary-General of the Office of the President, Taiwan
- In office 6 February 2007 – 19 May 2007
- President: Chen Shui-bian
- Preceded by: Mark Chen
- Succeeded by: Cho Jung-tai (acting)
- In office 6 February 2003 – 19 May 2004
- President: Chen Shui-bian
- Preceded by: Chen Shih-meng
- Succeeded by: Su Tseng-chang

6th & 8th Secretary-General of the National Security Council
- In office 20 May 2004 – 6 February 2007
- Chairman: Chen Shui-bian
- Preceded by: Kang Ning-hsiang
- Succeeded by: Mark Chen
- In office 7 March 2002 – 4 February 2004
- Chairman: Chen Shui-bian
- Preceded by: Ting Yu-chou
- Succeeded by: Kang Ning-hsiang

25th Secretary-General of the Executive Yuan
- In office 1 February 2002 – 1 July 2002
- Prime Minister: Chang Chun-hsiung
- Preceded by: Wea Chi-lin
- Succeeded by: Lee Ying-yuan

6th Secretary-General of the Democratic Progressive Party
- In office 3 July 1995 – 25 December 1998
- Chairman: Shih Ming-te; Hsu Hsin-liang; Lin I-hsiung
- Preceded by: Su Tseng-chang
- Succeeded by: Yu Shyi-kun

Personal details
- Born: 9 May 1950 (age 76) Pingtung County, Taiwan
- Party: Democratic Progressive Party (since 1986)
- Education: National Taiwan University (BA); University of Chicago (MA)

Chiou I-jen (Chinese: 邱義仁; pinyin: Qiū Yìrén; born May 9, 1950) is a Taiwanese politician who was the vice premier of the Republic of China between 17 May 2007 and 6 May 2008.

== Early life and education ==
Chiou was born in 1950 in Pingtung County in southern Taiwan. He earned a B.A. in philosophy from National Taiwan University in 1972, and subsequently went to the United States to attend the University of Chicago, where he earned a Master of Arts (M.A.) degree in political science in 1981. While attending the University of Chicago, Chiou was an influential member of the Taiwanese democratization movement, earning himself the nickname "Loudspeaker."

== Rise in politics ==
Chiou returned to Taiwan, and in 1983, members of the "New Tangwai Generation," including Chiou I-jen, formed the "Association of Tangwai Editors and Writers." The group was focused on bringing democracy to Taiwan, enshrining that goal in their charter: "...Taiwan's future should be decided by its 18 million inhabitants." The charter went on to say "...the people of Taiwan have the right to choose independence." In 1986, Chiou, along with other members of the Tangwai movement, helped the movement coalesce into a coherent political party, thus forming the Democratic Progressive Party (DPP). Given that the Kuomintang still ruled the island at the time and did not allow much at all in the way of political opposition, the DPP opted to take a low profile, yet continued to advocate its message of self-determination for Taiwan. Chiou's "New Tangwai Generation" group stuck together and formed the New Tide Faction within the DPP.

As the political climate in Taiwan grew less oppressive and more open, the DPP flourished and began competing with the KMT in elections. In the early 1990s, Chiou was appointed Secretary General of the DPP and served under party Chairmen Shih Ming-teh and Hsu Hsin-liang, but resigned from the post in 1998 to take responsibility for the poor performance of the DPP in the three-in-one elections. The DPP had also begun sending its own representatives to the United States, so as to counterbalance the views of the official KMT-run Taipei Economic and Cultural Representative Office. Subsequent to his resignation as DPP Secretary General, Chiou was appointed DPP representative, and was sent to Washington, DC.

== Career under Chen administration ==
While serving as DPP representative to Washington, Chiou also served as the campaign manager for former Taipei Mayor Chen Shui-bian, who was running as the DPP candidate for President. With Chen's election, Chiou was appointed Deputy Secretary General of the National Security Council. Shortly thereafter, Chiou was appointed Secretary General for the Executive Yuan, giving him a stronger hand in shaping government policy.

Chiou served in the EY until early 2002, when Yu Shyi-kun was appointed Premier. Premier Yu removed Chiou from his position as EY Secretary General and moved him to a position as minister without portfolio. In March 2002, Ting Yu-chou stepped down as Secretary General of the National Security Council, and President Chen selected Chiou to replace him. Chiou served in this position from 2002 to 2003.

In January 2003, in a reshuffle of personnel designed to better enable the DPP to wage its campaign for the 2004 Presidential election, President Chen moved Chiou from his position as NSC secretary general to become the secretary general of the Presidential Office, earning him the moniker "The Permanent Secretary General." Regarded as the DPP's top elections strategist, Chiou once again successfully managed Chen's campaign, despite the apparent assassination attempt on President Chen and Vice President Annette Lu.

After the successful conclusion of the 2004 election, Chiou was moved back to the National Security Council as secretary general, and remained there until early 2007, when he was moved back to the Presidential Office as secretary general. On May 17, 2007, along with the rest of the Cabinet of out-going Premier Su Tseng-chang, Dr. Tsai Ing-wen resigned to make way for incoming Premier Chang Chun-hsiung and his Cabinet. Premier Chang named Chiou I-jen, to replace Dr. Tsai as Vice Premier.

=== 2008 Scandal ===
On May 5, 2008, Chiou I-jen resigned from the ruling party after acknowledging responsibility for arranging the transfer of $29.8 million to a Taiwanese man acting as intermediary in a deal to try to get Papua New Guinea to officially recognize Taiwan. About the allegations, Chiou said, "I feel deeply ashamed in the face of my country and people; In addition to helping with judicial investigations, I will withdraw from my beloved Democratic Progressive Party. I believe the investigations will prove my innocence." Chiou was prosecuted with corruption and was prohibited from leaving Taiwan.

On May 6, 2008, he resigned from the vice premiership.

=== Detention ===
On October 31, 2008, Chiou was arrested and detained incommunicado, by Supreme Prosecutors Office's Special Investigation Division Prosecutors, for alleged embezzlement of about $500,000 (£308,000) from diplomatic funds, in 2004, as secretary-general of the National Security Council. Chen Shui-bian called his arrest a "political persecution" by the Beijing-friendly Kuomintang government amid and after another senior DPP member – Chiayi County magistrate Chen Ming-wen's detention on corruption charges: "The government abused the laws and its powers to persecute and humiliate us but the people and the history will return justice to us and prove our innocence. The government of President Ma Ying-jeou is settling old scores in the name of a campaign against corruption. The Special Investigation Division (SID), in order to indict and convict me, has been taking high-profile actions, locking up members of the former government team one by one." Chiou I-jen was the eighth suspect in spin-offs of Chen Shui-bian's money laundering probes under the jurisdiction of the Taipei District Court. He was ultimately found not guilty.

Government offices
Preceded by Tsai Ing-wen	Vice Premier of the Republic of China; 2007–2008	Succeeded by Paul Chiu
