= Hsu Jung-shu =

Taiwanese politician (born 1939)

Hsu Jung-shu MLY
- 許榮淑
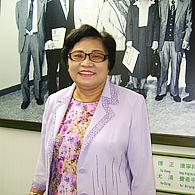
- Hsu in July 2009

Member of the Legislative Yuan
- In office 23 June 2005 – 31 January 2008
- Preceded by: Tsai Huang-liang
- Constituency: Republic of China
- In office 1 February 1993 – 31 January 2005
- Constituency: Republic of China
- In office 1 February 1981 – 31 January 1984
- Constituency: Taiwan 3rd Nantou County, Changhua County, Taichung County, Taichung City

Personal details
- Born: 27 December 1939 (age 86) Kōshun, Takao Prefecture, Taiwan, Empire of Japan (today Pingtung County, Taiwan)
- Party: People United Party (since 2009)
- Other political affiliations: Democratic Progressive Party (1986–2009)
- Spouse: Chang Chun-hung
- Education: National Taiwan Normal University (BA)

Hsu Jung-shu
- Traditional Chinese: 許榮淑
Transcriptions
Standard Mandarin
- Hanyu Pinyin: Xǔ Róngshú (Note: "Shú" is the pronunciation of the character "淑" in the Republic of China area, including Taiwan. In Mainland China this character would be pronounced "shū")
- Wade–Giles: Hsü³ Jung²-shu²

Hsu Jung-shu (Chinese: 許榮淑; born 27 December 1939) is a Taiwanese politician. She co-founded the Democratic Progressive Party in 1986, but was expelled over a 2009 trip to China. She entered politics through the Tangwai movement and served in the Legislative Yuan after her husband Chang Chun-hung was imprisoned in the aftermath of the 1979 Kaohsiung Incident.

== Education and activism ==
Hsu graduated from National Taiwan Normal University. When her husband Chang Chun-hung was imprisoned in the aftermath of the 1979 Kaohsiung Incident, Hsu left her job as a teacher to run for the Legislative Yuan. Because Hsu was active in the Tangwai movement as a distributor of opposition publications, the Kuomintang raided her house for copies of Senh Kin and Taiwan Weekly in January 1984 and September 1985, respectively.

== Political career ==
In her 1980 election to the legislature, Hsu won 190,000 votes, a district record, and was the only tangwai-affiliated woman to be seated. During her first term, Hsu continued active participation in opposition causes, visiting jailed activist Lin Hung-hsuan in January 1985 and making a May 1986 trip to the United States to address the first meeting of the US Congressional Committee for Democracy on Taiwan alongside Chou Ching-yu. That September, she and seventeen others founded the Democratic Progressive Party. Within the DPP, Hsu was linked to the New Dynamics and Formosa factions. She was entrusted with the responsibilities of high ranking party posts, becoming the first woman to serve as party whip. Hsu was also chair of the Central Review Committee and has served on the Central Standing Committee. Though she stepped down at the end of her term in 2005, Hsu was reappointed to the Legislative Yuan when Tsai Huang-liang chose to run for the Nantou County magistracy. Hsu was sworn in on 23 June. The next year, Kuomintang legislator Chiu Yi accused Hsu and others of embezzlement.

In 2007, Hsu visited China to discuss Cross-Strait crime. Later that year, she was invited to attend the opening ceremony of the Special Olympics World Summer Games. In 2009, Hsu began attending the Cross-Strait Economic, Trade and Culture Forum, despite senior DPP officials having advised her against it. Hsu's party membership was suspended on 23 July 2009, and she was officially expelled four days later. Shortly after her expulsion, Hsu founded the People United Party. She attended the 2010 forum, and the following year declared her candidacy for the 2012 presidential election. Hsu eventually dropped out of the campaign. In 2013, she was again in attendance at the Cross-Strait forum. Hsu sought the presidency again in 2016, and received support from the Taiwan Progressive Party, National Health Service Alliance, and Zhongshan Party. Her candidacy was nullified in November, as the People United Party had not submitted its petition of signatures to the Central Election Commission by the deadline.

== Personal life ==
Due to the events of the Kaohsiung Incident, Chang Chun-hung and Hsu Jung-shu have separated.
