= Chang Chun-hung =

Taiwanese politician

Chang Chun-hung MLY
- 張俊宏

Member of the Legislative Yuan
- In office 1 February 1996 – 31 January 2005
- Constituency: Republic of China
- In office 1 February 1993 – 31 January 1996
- Constituency: Taipei 2 (South)

Acting Chairman of the Democratic Progressive Party
- In office 23 March 1996 – 18 July 1996
- Preceded by: Shih Ming-teh
- Succeeded by: Hsu Hsin-liang

Member of the National Assembly
- In office 1992–1993

Secretary-General of the Democratic Progressive Party
- In office 1988–1992
- Preceded by: Huang Erh-hsuan
- Succeeded by: Chen Shih-meng

Member of the Taiwan Provincial Consultative Council
- In office 1977–1979

Member of the Taipei City Council
- In office 1973–1977

Personal details
- Born: 17 May 1938 (age 88) Nantō, Nantō, Taichū Prefecture, Taiwan, Empire of Japan (today Nantou City, Taiwan
- Party: Democratic Progressive Party (since 1986); Kuomintang (until 1973)
- Spouse: Hsu Jung-shu
- Education: National Taiwan University (BA, MA)

Chang Chun-hung (Chinese: 張俊宏; pinyin: Zhāng Jùnhóng; born 17 May 1938) is a Taiwanese politician.

== Education ==
Chang graduated from National Taiwan University with a bachelor's degree in political science and earned a master's degree in political science from the university in 1964.

== Political career ==
Chang was a member of the Kuomintang until 1973, when he left to join the Tangwai movement and won his first political office, a seat on the Taipei City Council. He served until 1977, when he was named to the Taiwan Provincial Consultative Council. During this period, Chang, Kang Ning-hsiang and Huang Shin-chieh published Taiwan Political Review, an opposition magazine. Chang also edited another Tangwai publication, The Intellectual. In 1979, Chang helped establish Formosa Magazine and served as the publication's chief editor. The Kaohsiung Incident occurred later that year, and Chang was sentenced to twelve years imprisonment on charges of sedition. He was released on 30 May 1987, and became secretary general of the Democratic Progressive Party the next year. In 1991, Chang was elected to the National Assembly. He resigned his seat to pursue a position as representative of Taipei South. Chang retained his position in the Legislative Yuan via party list proportional representation until 2005.

== Personal ==
Chang is married to fellow politician Hsu Jung-shu.

Party political offices
Preceded by Huang Erh-hsuan	Secretary-General of the Democratic Progressive Party; 1988–1992	Succeeded by Chen Shih-meng
Preceded by Shih Ming-teh	Chairperson of the Democratic Progressive Party (acting); 1996	Succeeded by Hsu Hsin-liang
