= Kang Ning-hsiang =

Taiwanese politician (born 1938)

Kang Ning-hsiang MLY
- 康寧祥
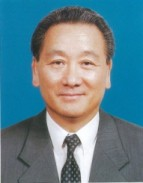

Secretary-General of the National Security Council
- In office 5 February 2003 – 20 May 2004
- Preceded by: Chiou I-jen
- Succeeded by: Chiou I-jen

Administrative Deputy Minister of National Defense
- In office 31 May 2002 – 31 January 2003
- Minister: Tang Yao-ming

Member of the Control Yuan
- In office 20 January 1993 – 30 May 2002

Member of the National Assembly
- In office 1 January 1992 – 19 January 1993

Member of the Legislative Yuan
- In office 1 February 1987 – 31 January 1990
- Constituency: Taipei
- In office 1 February 1973 – 31 January 1984
- Constituency: Taipei

Member of the Taipei City Council
- In office 1969–1972

Personal details
- Born: 16 November 1938 (age 87) Taihoku, Taihoku Prefecture, Taiwan, Empire of Japan
- Party: Democratic Progressive Party (1986–1993; since 2002)
- Education: National Chung Hsing University (BA)

Kang Ning-hsiang (Chinese: 康寧祥; born 16 November 1938) is a Taiwanese politician. He was active in the Tangwai movement, and began his political career as a supporter of Huang Hsin-chieh. Kang served in the Taipei City Council from 1969 to 1972, when he was first elected to the Legislative Yuan, on which he served three consecutive terms, until 1984. He lost reelection in 1983, and won a fourth term in 1986. Kang was subsequently elected to the National Assembly, but left the office to accept an appointment to the Control Yuan, a position he held until 2002. He was then successively appointed an administrative deputy minister of national defense, as secretary-general of the National Security Council, and adviser to president Chen Shui-bian. Kang is a founding member of the Democratic Progressive Party, though his party membership was suspended during his tenure on the Control Yuan.

== Education ==
Born in 1938, Kang was raised in Wanhua and graduated from National Chung Hsing University, where he studied public administration.

== Political career ==
Kang began his political career while Taiwan was still under martial law and is considered an early leader of the Tangwai movement. He ran Huang Hsin-chieh's 1969 legislative election campaign, and served as an independent on the Taipei City Council before contesting a legislative seat himself in 1972, which he won. He ran on a social welfare platform and sought to increase the representation of native Taiwanese in the government. Kang was one of two independent candidates to receive formal warnings from the Kuomintang while campaigning. The KMT believed that Kang's positions were too critical of the government, and threatened to suspend his run for office. In his first national-level election, Kang won approximately 83,000 votes. Kang started the magazine Taiwan Political Forum (also known as the Taiwan Political Review) in August 1975. After five issues, the government banned the publication. Kang launched another periodical in March 1978 called The Eighties. Despite a moderate tone, it was also eventually shut down, returning as Asian Monthly. In 1980, he declared his candidacy for a third legislative term, winning nearly 80,000 votes. Kang ran for another term in the Legislative Yuan election of 1983, and due to the efforts of what became the New Tide faction, suffered a surprising defeat. Subsequently, he secured a visiting appointment at Columbia University in the United States. Shortly after co-founding the Democratic Progressive Party, Kang contested the 1986 Legislative Yuan elections as a representative for Taipei and finished second in the total vote count for the district, serving until 1990. In November 1988, Kang received government permission to establish the Capital Morning News. It began in May 1989, and ran until August 1990 when it was shuttered due to lack of funds. In October, he was named to the National Unification Council, but missed the first meeting, as the Democratic Progressive Party had at first chosen to boycott the group over concerns about its name. Kang had been active in a preceding committee, the National Affairs Conference. After a stint in the National Assembly, he was appointed to the Control Yuan in 1993, and as a result, Kang's DPP membership was suspended. While a member of the Control Yuan, Kang played a lead role investigating the murder of Yin Ching-feng and the related La Fayette-class frigate scandal. In 1998, Kang participated in the follow-up meetings taking place after the initial Wang–Koo summit in 1993. Throughout 2002, it was reported that Kang would assume a deputy ministerial position at the Ministry of National Defense, and he eventually took office on 31 May. After two months with the MND, Kang's DPP membership was restored. In October, Kang visited the Pentagon in his official capacity, becoming the first Taiwanese official to be received in Washington D.C. since the termination of official relations in 1979. Kang was named the head of the National Security Council in February 2003, and during his tenure adopted a direct management style designed to enhance transparency within the institution. In June, Kang tried to promote longtime aide Huang Tsai-tien to rear admiral. The proposal was blocked, as Huang did not fulfill the requirements for promotion. Soon after, media reports alleged that Kang's leadership caused many others at the agency to resign, a claim he rejected. In August, another of Kang's hires was forced to resign, as she had been linked to entrepreneurship opportunities in China. Shortly after leaving the National Security Council, Kang was named a senior adviser to President Chen Shui-bian. By 2006, he had left that position.

After leaving government service, Kang became the president of the Foundation for Asia-Pacific Development.

== Political stances ==
Kang was described by The New York Times in 1978 as "the most successful and astute of the opposition," and is seen as a moderate member of the Democratic Progressive Party. He told the Times in 1988 that an independent Taiwan was an idea worthy of discussion. Kang met with Chinese politicians at the Democratic National Convention in the United States later that year, and made his opposition to the "one country, two systems" formula known. He believes that improvement in Cross-Strait relations should not cost Taiwan its path to democratization. He refused to support the three links until Taiwan's political status was resolved.

Kang was supportive of Fei Hsi-ping, Lee Teng-hui, and Liang Su-yung.
