= Wu Nai-ren =

Taiwanese politician

- 吳乃仁

Secretary-General of the Democratic Progressive Party
- In office 20 May 2010 – 20 December 2010
- Chairperson: Tsai Ing-wen
- Preceded by: Su Jia-chyuan
- Succeeded by: Su Jia-chyuan
- In office 20 May 2009 – 20 December 2009
- Chairperson: Tsai Ing-wen
- Preceded by: Wang Tuoh
- Succeeded by: Su Jia-chyuan
- In office 20 May 2000 – 20 March 2002
- Chairperson: Chen Shui-bian
- Preceded by: Yu Shyi-kun
- Succeeded by: Chang Chun-hsiung

Personal details
- Born: 16 December 1947 (age 78) Keelung City, Taiwan
- Party: Independent (since 2018)
- Other political affiliations: Democratic Progressive Party (until 2018)
- Education: Tunghai University (BA); Harvard University (MPA)

Wu Nai-ren (Chinese: 吳乃仁; pinyin: Wú Nǎirén; born 18 December 1947) is a Taiwanese politician. He is the former Secretary-General of the Democratic Progressive Party. When Cho Jung-tai declared his intention to run for the party chairmanship in December 2018, Wu withdrew from the party to protest Cho's candidacy.

== Education ==
Wu graduated from Tunghai University with a bachelor's degree in economics and did graduate studies in economics at National Chengchi University. He then earned a Master of Public Administration (M.P.A.) from Harvard University at the Harvard Kennedy School.
