= Cho Jung-tai =

Premier of Taiwan since 2024

- 卓榮泰
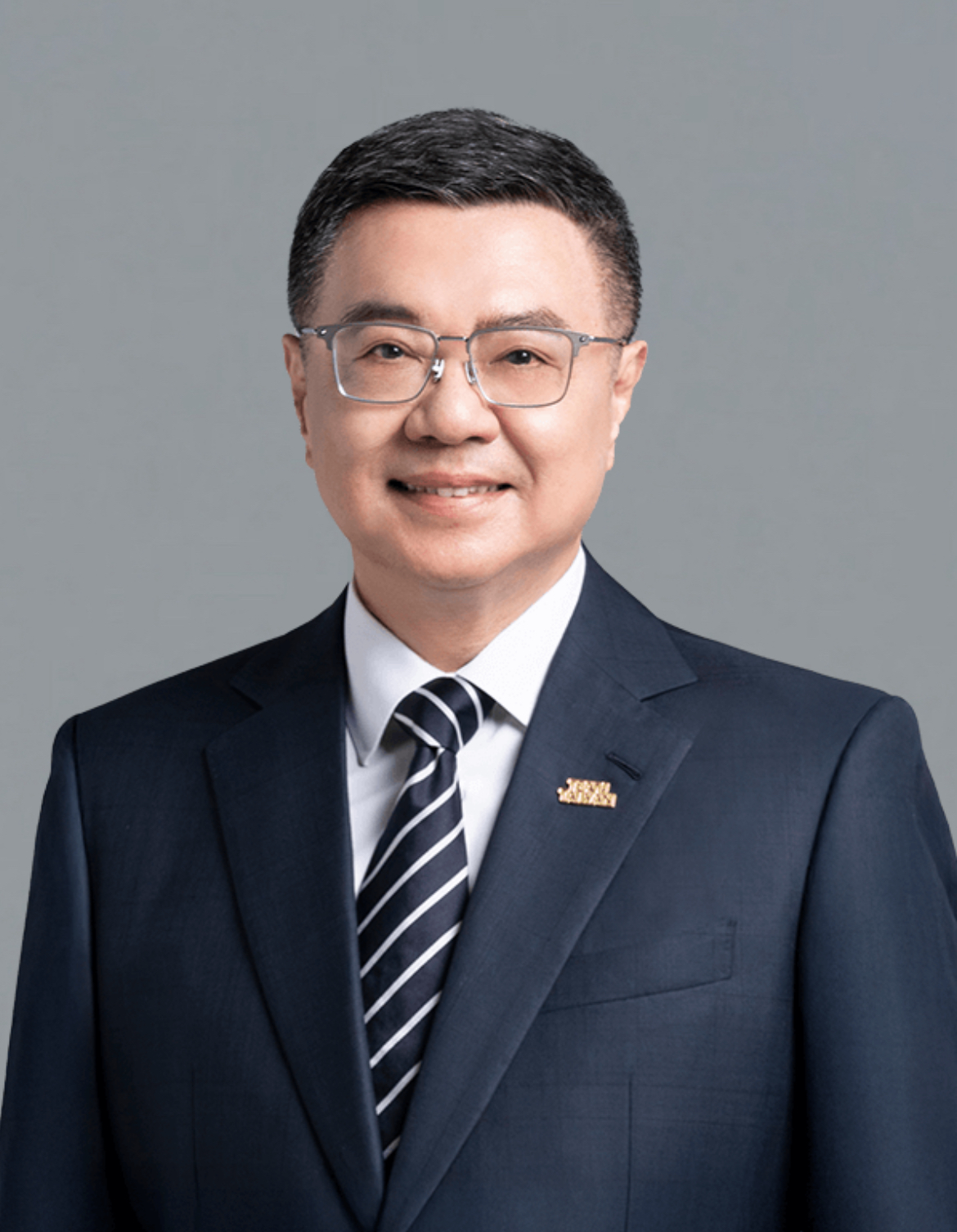
- Official portrait, 2025

29th Premier of Taiwan
- Incumbent
- Assumed office 20 May 2024
- President: Lai Ching-te
- Vice Premier: Cheng Li-chiun
- Preceded by: Chen Chien-jen

16th Chairman of the Democratic Progressive Party
- In office 9 January 2019 – 20 May 2020
- Secretary-General: Luo Wen-jia
- Preceded by: Lin Yu-chang (acting)
- Succeeded by: Tsai Ing-wen
Secretary-general offices
23rd & 34th Secretary-General of the Executive Yuan
In office 8 September 2017 – 28 December 2018
Premier	Lai Ching-te
Preceded by	Chen Mei-ling
Succeeded by	Ho Pei-shan (acting); Li Meng-yen
In office 19 September 2005 – 25 January 2006
Premier	Frank Hsieh
Preceded by	Lee Ying-yuan
Succeeded by	Liu Yuh-san
12th Secretary-General of the Democratic Progressive Party
In office 15 October 2007 – 15 January 2008
Chairman	Chen Shui-bian
Preceded by	Lin Chia-lung
Succeeded by	Lee Ying-yuan
Acting Secretary-General to the President
In office 21 May 2007 – 19 August 2007
President	Chen Shui-bian
Preceded by	Chiou I-jen
Succeeded by	Yeh Chu-lan

Member of the Legislative Yuan
- In office 1 February 1999 – 19 May 2004
- Constituency: Taipei I

Personal details
- Born: 22 January 1959 (age 67) Taipei, Taiwan
- Party: Democratic Progressive Party
- Education: National Chung Hsing University (LLB)

Cho Jung-tai
- Traditional Chinese: 卓榮泰
- Simplified Chinese: 卓荣泰
Transcriptions
Standard Mandarin
- Hanyu Pinyin: Zhuó Róngtài
- Wade–Giles: Cho2 Jung2-tʻai4

Cho Jung-tai (Chinese: 卓榮泰; pinyin: Zhuó Róngtài; Wade–Giles: Cho^{2} Jung^{2}-tʻai^{4}; born 22 January 1959) is a Taiwanese politician who has served as the premier of Taiwan since 2024.

A member of the Democratic Progressive Party (DPP), Cho served on the Taipei City Council from 1990 to 1998, when he was first elected to the Legislative Yuan. Cho remained a legislator through 2004, when he was appointed deputy secretary-general to the president during the Chen Shui-bian administration. During Frank Hsieh's 2008 presidential bid, Cho assumed the post of Secretary-General of the DPP. He returned to public service in 2017, as secretary-general of the Executive Yuan under Premier Lai Ching-te. In 2019, Cho succeeded Tsai Ing-wen as leader of the DPP. He remained leader of the party until May 2020, when Tsai resumed the role.

Cho worked on Lai Ching-te's 2024 presidential campaign and was appointed premier following Lai's election and inauguration as president.

== Early life and education ==
Cho was born in Taipei, Taiwan, on January 22, 1959. Both his father and grandfather worked for the Taiwan Railways Administration. His father later became a member of the Taipei City Council.

In 1977, while still a high-school student, Cho received a Kuomintang (KMT) membership card, although he later said that he did not subsequently transfer his party registration. After high school, he graduated from National Chung Hsing University with a Bachelor of Laws (LL.B.) degree in 1984. His law school classmates included Hsu Kuo-yung.

In 1985, at age 25, Cho began working as a paralegal at the Century United Law Office (世紀聯合法律事務所) in Taipei. The following year, he became a consultant to Taiwan New Culture (台灣新文化), a magazine associated with opposition politician Frank Hsieh, and in 1987 joined Hsieh's staff after Hsieh was elected to the Taipei City Council.

== Political career ==
Cho launched his career in politics as a city council aide to Frank Hsieh during his tenure in the Taipei City Council. He was later elected as member of the Taipei City Council from 1990 to 1998. Following two terms as city councillor, Cho was elected to the Legislative Yuan in 1998 and 2001. He vacated the position in May 2004, succeeding Chen Che-nan as deputy secretary-general to President Chen Shui-bian. He was appointed spokesperson of the Executive Yuan in January 2005. In January 2006, Cho resumed his previous post as deputy-secretary general within the presidential office. Cho was appointed Secretary-General of the Democratic Progressive Party in October 2007. He was replaced shortly following Frank Hsieh's loss in the presidential elections in March 2008.

Cho was appointed Secretary-General of the Executive Yuan in September 2017, and took office with the inauguration of the Lai Ching-te cabinet. In December 2018, Cho announced his intention to contest the DPP chairmanship vacated by Tsai Ing-wen after the DPP's landslide defeat in the local elections of 2018. The leadership election was held on 6 January 2019. During the contest, Cho received support from party heavyweights among the "middle generation" or "Wild Lily generation," including endorsements from Cheng Wen-tsan, Lin Chia-lung, Chen Chi-mai, Huang Wei-che, Lin Chih-chien, Weng Chang-liang and Pan Men-an. The Democratic Progressive Party reported that voter turnout was 16.9%. Cho won 24,699 votes total, and 72.6% of all votes cast. Cho took office on 9 January 2019, when the electoral results were formally announced. Cho stepped down from the chairmanship on 20 May 2020, as Tsai Ing-wen was inaugurated for a second presidential term.

=== Premiership (2024–present) ===
Cho was a central figure in then-Vice President Lai Ching-te's electoral campaign for the presidency in the 2024 elections. Following his victory, Lai appointed Cho to be his premier upon his inauguration on 20 May.

The Judiciary and Organic Laws Committee of the Legislative Yuan voted on December 18 to propose that the Control Yuan impeach Premier Cho over his refusal to countersign the Act Governing the Allocation of Government Revenues and Expenditures.

In March 2026, Cho made a personal trip to Tokyo to watch the 2026 World Baseball Classic, marking the first time the Taiwanese Premier visited Japan since diplomatic relations were severed in 1972. Chinese Ministry of Foreign Affairs spokesperson Guo Jiakun criticized the visit as having "evil designs" and warned "Japan's indulgence in provocation ... will inevitably come at a cost". The Japanese government defended the trip as a personal affair, while Cho said he paid for the trip himself.

== Personal life ==
Cho's wife, Kao Mei-chih (高美智), is a former law school classmate. They married in 1984.

Government offices
Preceded by Lee Ying-yuan	Secretary-General of the Executive Yuan; 2005–2006	Succeeded by Liu Yuh-san
Preceded by Chiou I-jen	Secretary-General to the President of the Republic of China; Acting; 2007	Succeeded by Yeh Chu-lan
Preceded by Chen Mei-ling	Secretary-General of the Executive Yuan; 2017–2018	Succeeded by Li Meng-yen
Preceded by Chen Chien-jen	Premier of the Republic of China; 2024–present	Incumbent
Party political offices
Preceded by Lin Chia-lung	Secretary-General of the Democratic Progressive Party; 2007–2008	Succeeded by Lee Ying-yuan
Preceded by Lin Yu-chang; Acting	Chairman of the Democratic Progressive Party; 2019–2020	Succeeded by Tsai Ing-wen
