= Chiang Peng-chien =

Taiwanese politician

Chiang Peng-chien MLY
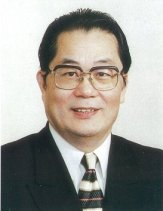

1st Chairperson of the Democratic Progressive Party
- In office November 28, 1986 – December 20, 1987
- Preceded by: Position established
- Succeeded by: Yao Chia-wen

Member of the Control Yuan
- In office September 1, 1996 – January 31, 1999

4th Secretary-General of the Democratic Progressive Party
- In office September 1992 – December 1993

Member of the Legislative Yuan
- In office January 25, 1995 – January 31, 1996
- Preceded by: David Hou
- Constituency: Republic of China (Democratic Progressive Party list)
- In office February 1, 1984 – January 31, 1987
- Constituency: Taipei

Personal details
- Born: April 25, 1940 Daitōtei, Taihoku Prefecture, Taiwan, Empire of Japan
- Died: December 15, 2000 (aged 60) Taipei, Taiwan
- Party: Democratic Progressive Party
- Education: National Taiwan University (LLB, LLM)
- Profession: Lawyer

Chiang Peng-chien (Chinese: 江鵬堅; pinyin: Jiāng Péngjiān; Wade–Giles: Chiāng P'éng-chiēn; Pe̍h-ōe-jī: Kang Pêng-kian; April 25, 1940 – December 15, 2000) was a Taiwanese politician who was a co-founder and the first chairperson of the Democratic Progressive Party. Chiang was elected a member of the Legislative Yuan in 1983 and became a member of the Control Yuan in 1996.

== Early life ==
Chiang Peng-chien was born on April 25, 1940, in Daitōtei, Taihoku Prefecture. His father was a shoemaker from Fujian, China.

In 1955, Chiang entered the Taipei Municipal Jianguo High School. He was then accepted to National Taiwan University, majoring in law. After graduation, he passed the bar examination in 1964. Chiang began practicing law after earning his master's degree.

Chiang founded the Taiwan Association for Human Rights. On Human Rights Day in 1979, members of the Formosa Magazine and other Tangwai pro-democracy advocates went on a demonstration. Many of the participants were arrested by the government and tried in military court. Chiang defended Lin Yi-hsiung, one of the Kaohsiung Eight.

== Political career ==
Chiang became involved in politics and supported the Tangwai movement. He was elected a member of the Legislative Yuan in 1983. In September 1986, about 130 pro-democracy advocates, including Chiang, gathered at the Grand Hotel in Taipei to establish the Democratic Progressive Party (DPP). On November 10, 1986, he was elected the first chairperson of the party.

In 1994, Chiang was a candidate for the DPP's nomination in the 1994 Taipei mayoral election. He competed against legislators Chen Shui-bian and Frank Hsieh and lost. He returned to the Legislative Yuan in January 1995, replacing David Hou as an at-large legislator on the DPP party list. In 1996, Chiang became a member of the Control Yuan. He worked to prevent any activities associated with black gold and actively investigated sensitive cases involved with former political oppression.

== Death and legacy ==
Chiang died in December 2000 of pancreatic cancer. His widow Peng Feng-mei donated his writings and books to the Academia Historia for display.

Party political offices
Preceded by None	Chairperson of the DPP; 1986–1987	Succeeded by Yao Chia-wen
