= Chang Chun-hsiung =

Taiwanese politician (1938–2025)

- 張俊雄
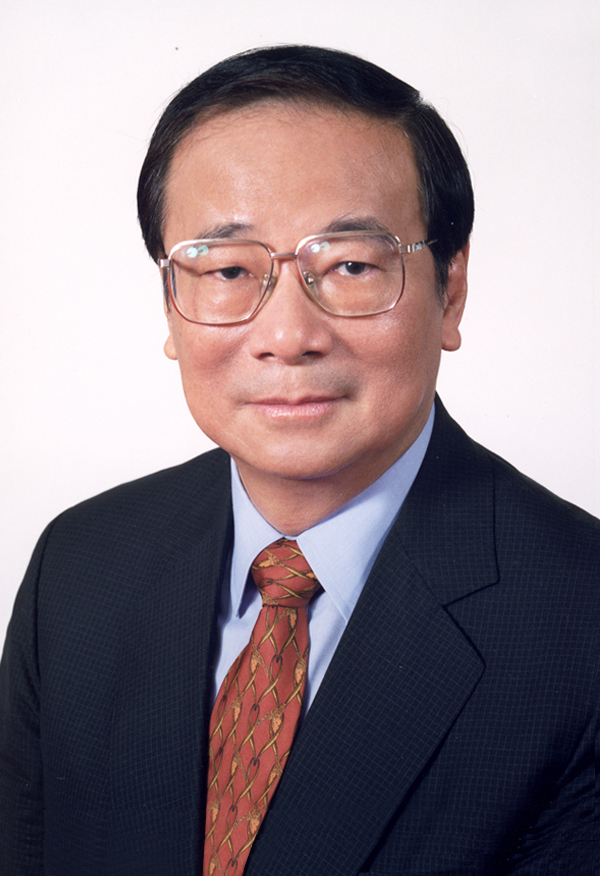
- Official portrait, 2000

14th & 18th Premier of Taiwan
- In office 21 May 2007 – 20 May 2008
- President: Chen Shui-bian
- Vice Premier: Chiou I-jen; Himself (acting)
- Preceded by: Su Tseng-chang
- Succeeded by: Liu Chao-shiuan
- In office 6 October 2000 – 1 February 2002
- President: Chen Shui-bian
- Vice Premier: Lai In-jaw
- Preceded by: Tang Fei
- Succeeded by: Yu Shyi-kun

17th Vice Premier of Taiwan
- Acting; 6 May 2008 – 20 May 2008
- Premier: Himself
- Preceded by: Chiou I-jen
- Succeeded by: Paul Chiu
- In office 27 July 2000 – 6 October 2000
- Premier: Tang Fei
- Preceded by: Yu Shyi-kun
- Succeeded by: Lai In-jaw
Additional positions
Senior Advisor to the President
In office 9 November 2016 – 27 September 2025
| President | Tsai Ing-wen; Lai Ching-te |
In office 1 February 2002 – 19 May 2004
| President | Chen Shui-bian |
2nd Chairperson of the Strait Exchange Foundation
In office 10 June 2005 – 21 May 2007
| Preceded by | Koo Chen-fu; Johnnason Liu (acting) |
| Succeeded by | Hung Chi-chang |
9th Secretary-General of the Democratic Progressive Party
In office 20 March 2002 – 1 February 2005
| Chairman | Chen Shui-bian |
| Preceded by | Wu Nai-ren |
| Succeeded by | Lee I-yang |
18th Secretary-General to the President
In office 20 May 2000 – 1 August 2000
| President | Chen Shui-bian |
| Preceded by | Ting Mao-shih |
| Succeeded by | Yu Shyi-kun |

Member of the Legislative Yuan
- In office 1 February 2005 – 1 May 2007
- Constituency: Party-list
- In office 1 February 1984 – 20 May 2000
- Constituency: Kaohsiung

Personal details
- Born: 23 March 1938 Kagi City, Tainan Prefecture, Taiwan, Empire of Japan
- Died: 27 September 2025 (aged 87) Kaohsiung, Taiwan
- Party: Democratic Progressive Party
- Spouses: Hsu Jui-ying (div); Chu A-ying
- Education: National Taiwan University (LLB); Dankook University (LLD)

Chang Chun-hsiung (Chinese: 張俊雄; pinyin: Zhāng Jùnxióng; Pe̍h-ōe-jī: Tiuⁿ Chùn-hiông; 23 March 1938 – 27 September 2025) was a Taiwanese politician and lawyer who served as the premier of the Republic of China from 2000 to 2002 and 2007 to 2008, both under Chen Shui-bian's presidency. His appointment by then-President Chen in 2000 marked the first time a Democratic Progressive Party (DPP) member occupied the premiership.

As a founding member of the DPP, he served on its Central Committee and Central Standing Committee from 1986 to 2000.

== Early life and education ==
Chang was born on 23 March 1938, in the city of Kagi (present-day Chiayi) during the Japanese rule of Taiwan. After graduating from National Chiayi Senior High School, he studied law at National Taiwan University and graduated with a Bachelor of Laws (LL.B.) degree in 1960. He joined the Kuomintang in 1970, but was expelled three years later for mounting a campaign for the Taipei City Council. As a lawyer, he defended the victims of the Kaohsiung Incident in 1980. From 1982 to 1986 he was President of the Kaohsiung Chapter of the YMCA. Chang later received a Doctor of Laws (LL.D.) from Dankook University in 2003.

== Political career ==
Chang was a member of the Legislative Yuan from 1983 to 2000. As a legislator, he was Executive Director and General Convener of the DPP Caucus from 1987 to 1988, 1990, and 1998 to 1999. He was Convener of the Judiciary Committee in 1991, of the Home and Border Affairs Committee in 92, and of the Transportation and Communications Committee in 95.

In 1994, Chang stood as the Democratic Progressive Party candidate to run for the mayor of Kaohsiung, but was defeated by the Kuomintang incumbent Wu Den-yih.

In the 2000 presidential election he was General Manager of Chen Shui-bian's campaign. In the Chen administration, he served as Secretary-General of the Office of the President in 2000, Vice Premier of the ROC in 2000 and Premier of the Republic of China from 6 October 2000 to 1 February 2002.

From 2002, he was Secretary General of the Democratic Progressive Party and a senior adviser in the Office of the President.

He ran in the 2004 Legislative Yuan election as fourth on the DPP's nationwide slate and was easily elected but resigned (as he promised to do during the campaign) since the Pan-Green Coalition failed to win a majority. He also tendered his resignation as Secretary-General of the Democratic Progressive Party to take responsibility for the defeat.

Chang was appointed the chairman of the Straits Exchange Foundation in 2005 after the death of the former chairman Koo Chen-fu. With the resignation of Su Tseng-chang as Premier on 12 May 2007, President Chen Shui-bian nominated Chang to fill the post of Premier a second time effective 21 May, and Hung Chi-chang succeeded Chang as the chairman of the Straits Exchange Foundation. Su's resignation and Chang's second appointment as Premier marked the sixth premier that Chen Shui-bian has appointed during his two terms as President.

== Personal life and death ==
Chang maintained a long-term marriage-like relationship with a paramour while remaining legally married to his first wife, Hsu Jui-ying. After his first term as Premier, he and Hsu divorced, and in 2007 he married his paramour (Chu A-ying) as his second wife.

Chang died on 27 September 2025 in Kaohsiung, Taiwan at the age of 87.

Government offices
| Preceded by Tang Fei | Premier of the Republic of China; 2000–2002 | Succeeded by Yu Shyi-kun |
| Preceded by Koo Chen-fu | President of the Straits Exchange Foundation; 2005–2007 | Succeeded by Hung Chi-chang |
| Preceded by Su Tseng-chang | Premier of the Republic of China; 2007–2008 | Succeeded by Liu Chao-hsiuan |
