= Wang Cheng-hsu =

Taiwanese physician and politician (born 1956)

Wang Cheng-hsu MLY
- 王正旭
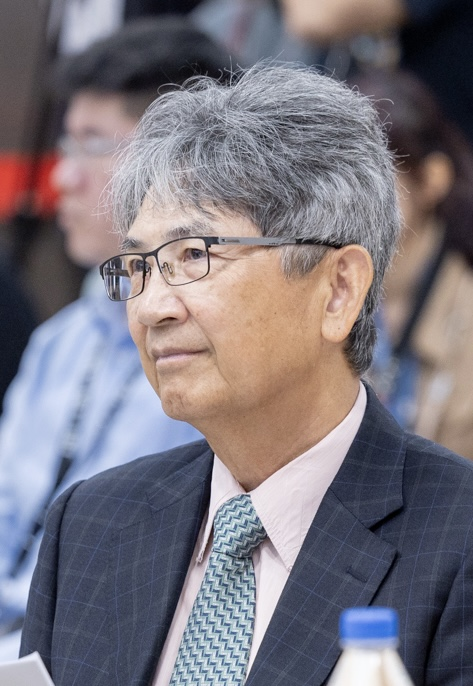
- Wang in 2024

Member of the Legislative Yuan
- Incumbent
- Assumed office 19 February 2024
- Preceded by: Yu Shyi-kun
- Constituency: Party-list

Personal details
- Born: 20 August 1956 (age 69) Chiayi County, Taiwan
- Party: Democratic Progressive Party
- Education: China Medical University (MB); National Yang-Ming University (PhD)

Wang Cheng-hsu (Chinese: 王正旭; born 20 August 1956) is a Taiwanese hematologist, oncologist, and politician who has served as a member of the Legislative Yuan since 2024.

== Early life, education, and medical career ==
Wang was born in Chiayi County. He graduated from China Medical University with a Bachelor of Medicine (M.B.) in 1982 and earned a Ph.D. in public health from National Yang-Ming University in 2017. His doctoral dissertation was titled, "A study on the long-term and short-term stress medication requirements of newly diagnosed cancer patients" (Chinese: 新診斷癌症病人長短期精神壓力藥物需求之探討). He began working for the Chang Gung Medical Foundation in 1984.

Wang has served as president of the Hope Foundation for Cancer Care and director of the Keelung Chang Gung Cancer Center. While affiliated with the Hope Foundation for Cancer Cure, Wang has commented on the efficacy of target therapy on breast cancer, use of dietary supplements by cancer patients, and the need for artificial intelligence to be regulated within the healthcare industry.

== Political career ==
Prior to the 2024 legislative election, Wang was ranked thirteenth on the Democratic Progressive Party list for proportional representation. Wang was seated as a member of the 11th Legislative Yuan after You Si-kun resigned. Wang formally took office on 19 February 2024.
