= Su Tseng-chang =

Taiwanese politician

- 蘇貞昌
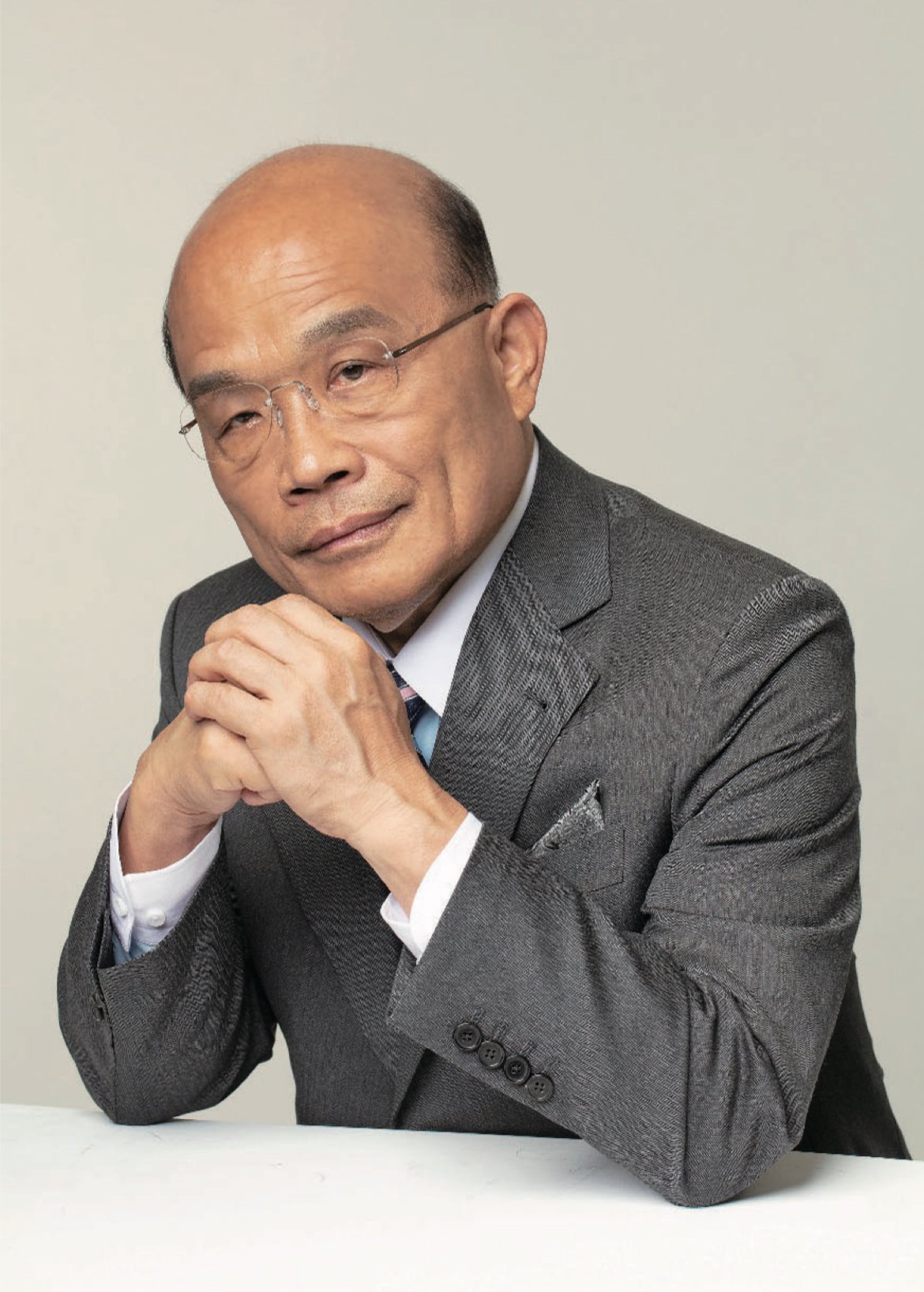
- Official portrait, 2024

Senior Advisor to the President
- Incumbent
- Assumed office 1 August 2024
- President: Lai Ching-te

17th & 27th Premier of the Republic of China
- In office 14 January 2019 – 31 January 2023
- President: Tsai Ing-wen
- Vice Premier: Chen Chi-mai; Shen Jong-chin
- Preceded by: Lai Ching-te
- Succeeded by: Chen Chien-jen
- In office 25 January 2006 – 21 May 2007
- President: Chen Shui-bian
- Vice Premier: Tsai Ing-wen
- Preceded by: Frank Hsieh
- Succeeded by: Chang Chun-hsiung

10th & 14th Chairman of the Democratic Progressive Party
- In office 30 May 2012 – 28 May 2014
- Deputy: Lin Hsi-yao
- Preceded by: Chen Chu (acting)
- Succeeded by: Tsai Ing-wen
- In office 15 February 2005 – 3 December 2005
- Deputy: Chang Chun-hsiung; Lee I-yang
- Preceded by: Ker Chien-ming (acting)
- Succeeded by: Annette Lu (acting)

23rd Secretary-General to the President
- In office 20 May 2004 – 1 January 2005
- President: Chen Shui-bian
- Preceded by: Chiou I-jen
- Succeeded by: Yu Shyi-kun

11th Magistrate of Taipei County
- In office 20 December 1997 – 20 May 2004
- Preceded by: You Ching
- Succeeded by: Lin Hsi-yao (acting)

Member of the Legislative Yuan
- In office 1 February 1996 – 20 December 1997
- Constituency: Taipei County

5th Secretary-General of the Democratic Progressive Party
- In office 22 November 1993 – 3 July 1995
- Chairman: Hsu Hsin-liang; Shih Ming-te
- Preceded by: Chiang Peng-chien
- Succeeded by: Chiou I-jen

8th Magistrate of Pingtung
- In office 20 December 1989 – 20 December 1993
- Preceded by: Shih Meng-hsiung
- Succeeded by: Wu Tse-yuan

Personal details
- Born: 28 July 1947 (age 79) Pingtung City, Taiwan
- Party: Democratic Progressive Party
- Spouse: Chan Hsiu-ling
- Children: 3, including Chiao-hui
- Education: National Taiwan University (LLB)

Chinese name
- Traditional Chinese: 蘇貞昌
- Simplified Chinese: 苏贞昌
Transcriptions
Standard Mandarin
- Hanyu Pinyin: Sū Zhēnchāng
Southern Min
- Hokkien POJ: So͘ Cheng-chhiong

Su Tseng-chang (Chinese: 蘇貞昌; pinyin: Sū Zhēnchāng; Pe̍h-ōe-jī: So͘ Cheng-chhiong; born 28 July 1947) is a Taiwanese politician who served as the premier of the Republic of China from 2006 to 2007 and again from 2019 to 2023. He was the chairman of the Democratic Progressive Party in 2005 and from 2012 to 2014. Su served as Chief of Staff to President Chen Shui-bian in 2004. He is currently the longest-serving Democratic Progressive premier in history.

Su actively campaigned for the DPP presidential nomination in 2008, but finished second to Frank Hsieh. Su eventually teamed with Hsieh as the vice presidential nominee; the DPP lost to the Kuomintang ticket of Ma Ying-jeou and Vincent Siew. Su ran for Taipei City Mayor in November 2010, but lost to the incumbent Hau Lung-pin by a 12-point margin. Su campaigned for the 2012 presidential candidacy of the DPP in 2011, but lost to Tsai Ing-wen by a very narrow margin. Following the loss of Tsai to Ma Ying-jeou, Su was elected to succeed Tsai as DPP chairman in 2012.

During the Chen administration, Su, along with politicians Annette Lu, Frank Hsieh and Yu Shyi-kun, are collectively known as the "Big Four of the Democratic Progressive Party". Su is nicknamed the "Lightbulb" or "E Ball" (電火球) and "Go Go Go" (衝衝衝) by the Taiwanese media and DPP voters, a nickname he earned in the 1980s for his charismatic approach to campaigning during election season, in addition to being an affectionate reference to the balding Su.

== Early life and career ==
Su was born at Ministry of Health and Welfare Pingtung Hospital in Pingtung, Taiwan, on 28 July 1948. He studied at the National Taiwan University, where he earned his Bachelor of Laws. He was a practicing lawyer from 1973 to 1983 and became a defense attorney in the Kaohsiung Incident trials. In September 1986, Su and seventeen others founded the Democratic Progressive Party.

He was previously the magistrate of Pingtung County (1989–1993) and magistrate of Taipei County (1997–2004). His first election as the Taipei magistrate was aided by a split between the New Party, the Kuomintang, and independent candidate Lin Chih-chia. He won the election in dramatic fashion partly due to the appearance of the terminally ill Lu Hsiu-yi, who kneeled on stage in support of Su on the eve of the election. Su's subsequent reelection occurred by a wide margin despite the ability of the Pan-Blue Coalition to present a united candidate, Wang Chien-shien. He was Secretary-General (Chief of Staff) to the Office of the President of the Republic of China under President Chen Shui-bian (2004–2005). After President Chen resigned as DPP chairman following the 2004 legislative elections, he was elected the 10th-term DPP chairman. Following DPP losses in the 2005 municipal elections on December 3, Su announced that he would, pursuant to a pre-election promise, resign from the chairmanship.

== First premiership: 2006–2007 ==
Su was announced as the new premier on January 19, 2006, and took his oath of office, along with his cabinet, on January 25, 2006. Soon after, Su promised to step down if the people's welfare (referring to crime and other civil problems) did not improve within six months. Su faced calls for his resignation after the Rebar Chinese Bank run, but refused to leave his post at the time.

Su was a contender for the DPP nomination in the 2008 presidential election. He formally announced his candidacy on Feb. 25. In the DPP primary vote on May 6, 2007, Su received 46,994 votes, coming in second to former Premier Frank Hsieh. Conceding defeat in the primary, Su announced that he had withdrawn from the race.

On May 12, 2007, Su submitted his letter of resignation to President Chen Shui-bian, ending his tenure on May 21. With the resignation of Su and with ten months left in Chen's presidency, that would mean Chen's eight years as president will have seen at least six Premiers (with Chang Chun-Hsiung serving two separate tenures). Su also stated that he previously submitted resignations numerous times over his sixteen-month tenure, but all were rejected by President Chen.

=== First cabinet ===
The First Su Cabinet
Office	Name	Term
Premier	Su Tseng-chang	2006–2007
Vice Premier	Tsai Ing-wen	2006–2007
Minister of the Interior	Lee I-yang	2006–2008
Minister of Foreign Affairs	James C. F. Huang	2006–2008
Minister of National Defense	Lee Jye	2006–2007
Minister of Finance	Joseph Lyu	2006–2006
Minister of Finance	Ho Chih-chin	2006–2008
Minister of Justice	Shih Mao-lin	2005–2008
Minister of Economic Affairs	Morgan Huang	2006–2006
Minister of Economic Affairs	Steve Chen	2006–2008
Minister of Transportation and Communications	Kuo Yao-chi	2006–2006
Minister of Transportation and Communications	Tsai Duei	2006–2008
Minister of Education	Tu Cheng-sheng	2006–2008

== 2008 presidential campaign ==
Su ran for vice president alongside Frank Hsieh, who was the DPP nominee. Together, Su and Hsieh ran against Ma and Siew. On March 22, they lost in a landslide to Ma and Siew's 7,659,014 (58.45%) votes with their 5,444,949 (41.55%) votes.

Party	Candidate		Votes	Percentage
Party	President	Vice president	Votes	Percentage
Kuomintang	Ma Ying-Jeou	Vincent Siew	7,659,014	58.45%
Democratic Progressive Party	Frank Hsieh	Su Tseng-chang	5,444,949	41.55%
Total			13,103,963	100.00%

== 2010 Taipei mayoral race ==
Although Su had been considered a strong candidate to helm the newly created New Taipei City, because he had previously served the area as Taipei County Magistrate, he instead ran for the mayoralty of Taipei City. Su vowed that should he win, he would serve out the entire term (through 2014) effectively ending any talks of a presidential run in 2012. Su eventually lost the race to the incumbent mayor Hau Lung-pin.

2010 Taipei City Mayoral Election Result
Party	#	Candidate	Votes	Percentage
Independent	1	Wu Yen-cheng (吳炎成)	1,832	0.13%
Kuomintang	2	Hau Lung-pin	797,865	55.65%
Independent	3	Helen Hsiao (蕭淑華)	2,238	0.16%
Independent	4	Francis Wu (吳武明)	3,672	0.26%
Democratic Progressive Party	5	Su Tseng-chang	628,129	43.81%
Total			1,433,736	100.00%
Voter turnout			70.65%	

== 2012 campaigns ==
Su declared his candidacy for the 2012 presidential candidacy, but lost a DPP party primary held in April 2011 to Tsai Ing-wen and Hsu Hsin-liang, by a margin of 1.35 percent. He was subsequently elected DPP chairman in May 2012, and was succeeded by Tsai in 2014, after dropping out of the chairmanship election in the wake of the Sunflower Student Movement.

== 2018 New Taipei mayoral race ==
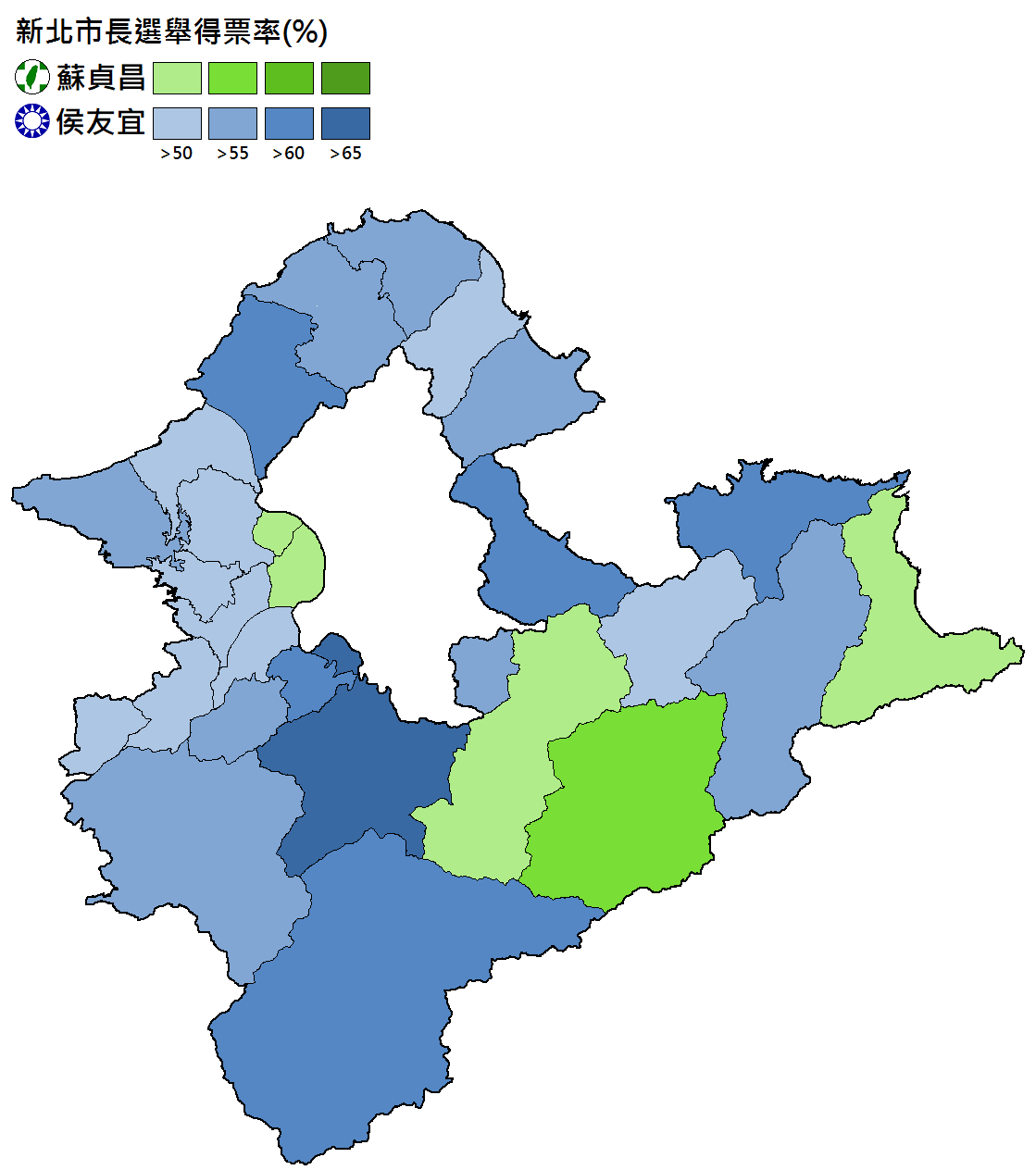
2018 New Taipei mayoralty election result

2018 New Taipei City mayoral results
No.	Candidate	Party	Votes	Percentage
1	Su Tseng-chang	Democratic Progressive Party	873,692	42.85%
2	Hou You-yi	Kuomintang	1,165,130	57.15%

Total voters: 3,264,128; Valid votes: 2,038,822; Voter turnout: 62.46%.

== Second premiership: 2019–2023 ==
Su was appointed to the premiership on January 14, 2019, by President Tsai Ing-wen. He succeeded William Lai, who had resigned in response to the Democratic Progressive Party's poor performance in the 2018 Taiwanese local elections. Aged 71, when he returned to the premiership, Su became one of the oldest to hold the office. Soon after Su assumed office, approval ratings for Tsai's presidential administration rose. Su and his second cabinet resigned en masse following the 2020 Taiwanese legislative election, as stipulated in the constitution, but Tsai, who won reelection to the presidency, asked him to remain in his post.

Su visited the crash site of the Hualien train derailment.

On November 5, 2021, Su was sanctioned by the Taiwan Affairs Office of the People's Republic of China as a "diehard "Taiwan independence" separatist" for "fanning up hostility across the Taiwan Strait and maliciously smearing the mainland".

On January 19, 2023, Su announced his resignation as Premier as part of a reshuffle following the DPP's heavy defeat in the 2022 Taiwanese local elections. On January 30, Su and his cabinet resigned en masse again. He was replaced by former Vice-president Chen Chien-jen the following day, on January 31.

=== Second cabinet ===
The Second Su Cabinet
Office	Name	Term
Premier	Su Tseng-chang	2019–2023
Vice Premier	Chen Chi-mai	2019–2020
Vice Premier	Shen Jong-chin	2020–2023
Secretary-General	Li Meng-yen	2019–2023
Minister of the Interior	Hsu Kuo-yung	2019–2022
Minister of the Interior	Hua Ching-chun	2022–2023
Minister of Foreign Affairs	Joseph Wu	2019–2023
Minister of National Defense	Yen Teh-fa	2019–2021
Minister of National Defense	Chiu Kuo-cheng	2021–2023
Minister of Finance	Su Jain-rong	2019–2022
Minister of Finance	Chuang Tsui-yun	2022–2023
Minister of Education	Pan Wen-chung	2019–2023
Minister of Justice	Tsai Ching-hsiang	2019–2023
Minister of Economic Affairs	Shen Jong-chin	2019–2020
Minister of Economic Affairs	Wang Mei-hua	2020–2023
Minister of Transportation and Communications	Lin Chia-lung	2019–2021
Minister of Transportation and Communications	Wang Kwo-tsai	2021–2023
Minister of Labor	Hsu Ming-chun	2019–2023
Minister of Health and Welfare	Chen Shih-chung	2019–2022
Minister of Health and Welfare	Hsueh Jui-yuan	2022–2023
Minister of Culture	Cheng Li-chun	2019–2020
Minister of Culture	Lee Yung-te	2020–2023
Minister of Science and Technology	Chen Liang-gee	2019–2020
Minister of Science and Technology	Wu Tsung-tsong	2020–2022
Ministry of Digital Affairs	Audrey Tang	2022–2023

== Personal life ==
Su is married to Chan Hsiu-ling (詹秀齡) with whom he has three daughters, one of which is Su Chiao-hui. Su goes by the name "Hope" in his LINE profile.

== See also ==
- Politics of Taiwan

Political offices
Preceded by Shih Meng-hsiung	Magistrate of Pingtung County; 1989–1993	Succeeded by Wu Tse-yuan
Preceded by You Ching	Magistrate of Taipei County; 1997–2003	Succeeded by Lin Hsi-yao
Preceded by Frank Hsieh	Premier of the Republic of China; 2006–2007	Succeeded by Chang Chun-hsiung
Preceded by William Lai	Premier of the Republic of China; 2019–2023	Succeeded by Chen Chien-jen
Party political offices
Preceded by Ker Chien-ming; Acting	Chairman of the Democratic Progressive Party; 2005	Succeeded by Annette Lu; Acting
Preceded by Chen Chu; Acting	Chairman of the Democratic Progressive Party; 2012–2014	Succeeded by Tsai Ing-wen
