= Frank Hsieh =

Taiwanese politician, lawyer, and diplomat

- 謝長廷
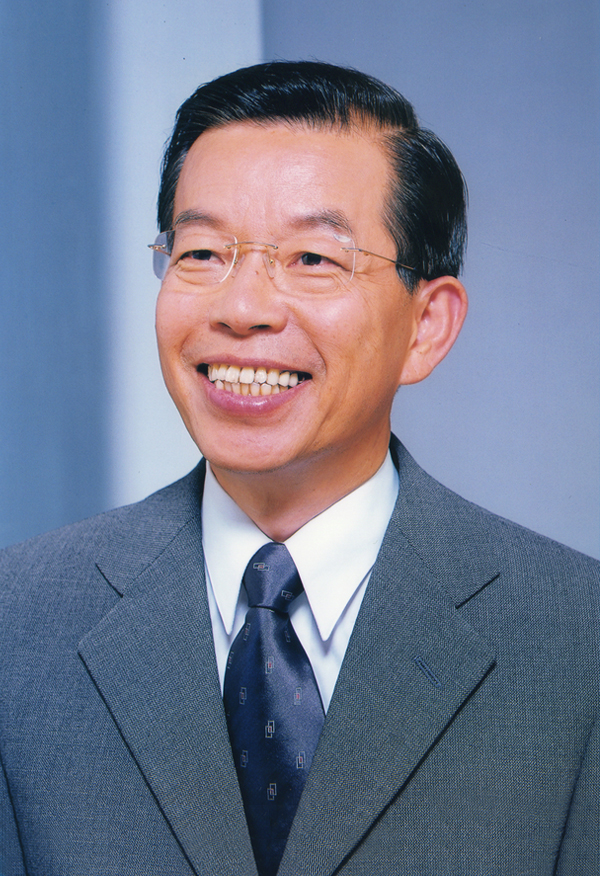
- Official portrait, 2005

16th Premier of Taiwan
- In office 1 February 2005 – 25 January 2006
- President: Chen Shui-bian
- Vice Premier: Wu Rong-i
- Preceded by: Yu Shyi-kun
- Succeeded by: Su Tseng-chang

3rd Chairman of the Taiwan–Japan Relations Association
- Incumbent
- Assumed office 5 January 2026
- President: Lai Ching-te
- Preceded by: Su Jia-chyuan
Senior positions
8th Chairman of the Democratic Progressive Party
Acting; 12 January 2008 – 20 May 2008
Preceded by	Chen Shui-bian
Succeeded by	Tsai Ing-wen
In office 20 April 2000 – 21 July 2002
Deputy	See list: Yu Shyi-kun Wu Nai-ren Chang Chun-hsiung
Preceded by	Lin Yi-hsiung
Succeeded by	Chen Shui-bian
2nd Mayor of Kaohsiung
In office 25 December 1998 – 1 February 2005
Preceded by	Wu Den-yih
Succeeded by	Chen Chi-mai (acting)
Additional positions
Senior Advisor to the President
In office 1 August 2024 – 19 May 2026
President	Lai Ching-te

12th Ambassador of Taiwan to Japan
- In office 9 June 2016 – 6 August 2024
- President: Tsai Ing-wen; Lai Ching-te
- Preceded by: Shen Ssu-tsun
- Succeeded by: Lee I-yang

Member of the Legislative Yuan
- In office 1 February 1993 – 31 January 1996
- Constituency: Taipei II
- In office 1 February 1990 – 31 January 1993
- Constituency: Taipei I

Taipei City Councillor
- In office 25 December 1981 – 25 December 1989
- Constituency: Taipei II (Chiencheng, Yianping, Zhongshan)

Personal details
- Born: 18 May 1946 (age 80) Taipei, Taiwan
- Party: Democratic Progressive Party
- Spouse: Yu Fang-chih
- Education: National Taiwan University (LLB); Kyoto University (LLM)

Chinese name
- Traditional Chinese: 謝長廷
- Simplified Chinese: 谢长廷
Transcriptions
Standard Mandarin
- Hanyu Pinyin: Xiè Chángtíng
- Bopomofo: ㄒㄧㄝˋ ㄔㄤˊ ㄊㄧㄥˊ
- Wade–Giles: Hsieh^{4} Ch'ang^{2}-t'ing^{2}
- Tongyong Pinyin: Siè Cháng-tíng
Southern Min
- Hokkien POJ: Siā Tiông-têng / Chiā Tiông-têng

Frank Hsieh Chang-ting (Chinese: 謝長廷; pinyin: Xiè Chángtíng; born 18 May 1946) is a Taiwanese politician, diplomat, and former defense attorney who has served as the chairman of the Taiwan–Japan Relations Association since 2026. He was the premier of the Republic of China in the administration of Chen Shui-bian from 2005 to 2006, the mayor of Kaohsiung from 1998 to 2005, and a member of the Legislative Yuan from 1990 to 1996.

Born in Taipei, Hsieh earned law degrees from National Taiwan University and Kyoto University in 1970 and 1972, respectively. He practiced law as a defense attorney and rose to prominence as a member of the legal team defending the eight pro-democracy activists arrested in the 1979 Kaohsiung Incident. He was elected to the Taipei City Council in 1981, helped found the Democratic Progressive Party (DPP) in 1986, and was elected a member of the Legislative Yuan in 1990.

After serving two terms as mayor of Kaohsiung and a term as chairman of the Democratic Progressive Party from 2000 to 2002, Hsieh was named the premier under Chen Shui-bian. At the end of Chen's presidency, he was named the DPP's candidate in the 2008 presidential election, but was defeated by Ma Ying-jeou. He has since held multiple ambassadorial and advisory positions under presidents Tsai Ing-wen and Lai Ching-te.

== Early life and education ==
Hsieh was born in Dadaocheng, Taipei, on 18 May 1946. His ancestral home is in Dongshan County, Fujian. His ancestors had migrated from Fujian to Taiwan in 1815. Both his grandfather and father were physicians practicing traditional Chinese medicine. As a child, Hsieh spent time living with his parents in a military dependents' village. During high school, he became a gymnast and won a gold medal in a provincial athletics competition. He attended Taipei Municipal Shilin High School of Commerce, during which time he gave up gymnastics in order to attend cram schools.

In 1967, Hsieh enrolled at National Taiwan University, where he studied law. As an undergraduate, he worked as a private tutor, joined a debate society (健言社), and attended lectures on sociology and history. He developed a reputation as a notable student debater; on one occasion, he debated against Ma Ying-jeou, who was also a law student at the university. Among his teachers in college was the jurist Weng Yueh-sheng and the Japanese legal scholar Hideo Tanaka. In 1969, during his third year in law school, Hsieh attained the highest scores in the national bar examination and qualified as an attorney. He graduated with a Bachelor of Laws (LL.B.) in 1970.

After law school, Hsieh was awarded a full scholarship by the Japanese Ministry of Education to pursue graduate studies in Japan at Kyoto University, where he studied jurisprudence. While in Japan, he came under the influence of legal scholar Watanabe Yōzō. He earned a Master of Laws (LL.M.) from the Kyoto University Faculty of Law in 1972 and studied towards a doctorate in law there until 1976. Hsieh ultimately withdrew from the doctoral program—all but dissertation—after his father was diagnosed with liver cancer.

== Early career ==
Through a classmate's introduction, Hsieh began his legal career as an associate attorney at a Taipei law firm founded by a Japanese-educated partner, Liu Wang-tsai (劉旺才). Liu was a prominent lawyer whose firm also included Chen Ji-sheng, head of the Office of the President, and democracy activist Lin Yi-hsiung. Hsieh worked there for several years upon returning from Japan. He would remain a practicing attorney until 1981. His work concentrated on bankruptcy and corporate liquidation, and other matters concerning commercial law. He handled multiple prominent bankruptcy cases throughout his practice, including the Cathay Trust controversy, and oversaw workers' compensation and the freezing of client companies' assets.

Hsieh rose to national prominence while working as a defense attorney for the political dissidents implicated in the 1979 Kaohsiung Incident.

== Rise in politics ==
Prior to the 1986 establishment of the Democratic Progressive Party, Hsieh, Chen Shui-bian and Lin Cheng-chieh were known as the "three musketeers" of the tangwai movement. Hsieh cofounded the party and was the one who proposed its current name. He has also served as its chairman twice. A two-time Taipei City councilor from 1981 to 1988, Hsieh was then elected to the Legislative Yuan, the next year, and won reelection in 1992. Instead of running for reelection in the 1995 legislative elections, Hsieh chose to run in the 1994 Taipei mayoral election, and lost a primary to eventual winner Chen Shui-bian. In September 1995, Peng Ming-min and Hsieh were placed on the Democratic Progressive Party ticket for the 1996 presidential election. They finished second with 21.1% of the vote.

== Kaohsiung mayoralty ==
In 1997, Hsieh successfully negotiated the surrender of the gunman in the Alexander family hostage crisis, raising his national profile.

To the surprise of many observers, Hsieh won the 1998 Kaohsiung City mayoral election, and defeated the Kuomintang incumbent, Wu Den-yih, by 4,565 votes. His administration focused on improving water quality in surrounding rivers as well as a general overhaul of the port of Kaohsiung. Hsieh supported placing the port, at the time run largely by the central government, under the jurisdiction of Kaohsiung City Government. Under Hsieh's leadership efforts to clean up the heavily polluted Love River began in 1999, and ended in 2002. He was also largely responsible for the establishment of the Kaohsiung Metro. These achievements helped Hsieh earn strong support among Kaohsiung citizens. He was re-elected for a four-year term in 2002. Hsieh was projected to win easily, but People First Party chair James Soong publicly supported Kuomintang candidate Huang Jun-ying, which helped Huang earn more votes. Hsieh defeated Huang by 24,838 votes (3.22%).

== Premiership and aftermath ==
In January 2005, Hsieh was appointed premier, forcing him to leave his post as mayor of Kaohsiung. Chen Chi-mai succeeded him as acting mayor.

Kuomintang politicians asked Hsieh to step down from the premiership shortly after the Kaohsiung MRT foreign workers scandal broke. Hsieh eventually resigned as premier in the aftermath of the 2005 "Three-in-One" elections, which the DPP lost in a landslide.

As the DPP candidate for the 2006 Taipei Mayoral election, Hsieh lost the race to KMT candidate Hau Lung-pin by 166,216 votes (12.92%). The loss was largely expected, as Taipei was considered a Kuomintang stronghold.

In February 2007, he led the Taiwanese delegation to the 55th annual United States National Prayer Breakfast in Washington, D.C., hosted by the U.S. Congressional Committee, with dignitaries including President George W. Bush.

== 2008 presidential campaign ==
Hsieh was frequently considered to be a leading contender for the DPP nomination in the 2008 presidential election, and formally announced his intention to run in the election on February 16, 2007. Hsieh was the second to formally declared candidacy, after the Kuomintang's Ma Ying-jeou did so three days prior. Hsieh won 45% of the vote in the Democratic Progressive Party primary. A scheduled straw poll was cancelled after his three primary opponents all conceded defeat, and Hsieh was declared the DPP nominee. In July 2007, Hsieh visited the United States, branding it "the journey of Love and Trust" (「愛與信任」之旅). In September 2007, Hsieh openly declared that he was running for the presidency of the State of Taiwan (台灣國), saying that "recogniz[ing] ourselves (the Taiwanese people) as a nation first and then fight[ing] for what we want during negotiations with other countries" is important. As a result of the Kuomintang's allegations of graft against Hsieh, prosecutors began an investigation of him in 2007. The investigation ended in September, when it was announced that Hsieh would not be charged with wrongdoing.

Regarding Ma Ying-jeou's idea of a "cross-strait common market," Hsieh states that if Taiwan only focuses on the economy, it will end up like Hong Kong and Macau, whose only goal in life is to make money. Hsieh believes that improving the economy is as important as preserving national dignity, and that the goal of economic development is more than just making money, but it is also improving the happiness of people.

Following the DPP's poor performance in the 2008 legislative election, Hsieh replaced Chen Shui-bian as party chairman.

In January 2008, Hsieh accused candidate Ma Ying-jeou of having a United States green card. Subsequent investigations revealed that one of Ma's sisters and one of his two daughters are US citizens. Hsieh stated that if Ma made public documented proof that he had renounced the green card, Hsieh would withdraw from the election.

The election was devastating to Hsieh and the DPP because he lost by a wider-than-expected margin of 17%. Hsieh had stated that if he lost this election, he would not run for office again. He resigned from the DPP chairmanship to take responsibility for the defeat. Tsai Ing-wen was elected as the new chairperson of the DPP.

In July 2010, Hsieh stood for the DPP's central committee standing membership election and won.

== Cross-strait relations ==
=== 2012 mainland visit ===
In October 2012, Hsieh went to mainland China for five days as the highest-ranking DPP official ever to visit. However, the trip was made in no political capacity, but rather as a private citizen. He visited Xiamen and the Dongshan Islands in Fujian as well as Beijing on October 4–8.

He met with then State Councilor Dai Bingguo, then President Chen Yunlin of the Association for Relations Across the Taiwan Straits and then Director Wang Yi of the Taiwan Affairs Office.

Although both sides agreed on the One-China policy, which governs Cross-Strait relations, Hsieh prefers to have a new consensus he called Two Sides, Two Constitutions instead of the 1992 consensus.

Hsieh reiterated his "Two Sides, Two Constitutions" initiative while on an April 2013 visit to the United States, and urged Beijing to accept difference across the Taiwan Strait for both sides being able to facilitate dialogue.

=== Hong Kong cross-strait forum ===
In late June 2013, Hsieh attended a two-day forum on cross-strait relations entitled "Development and Innovation of Cross-Strait Relations" in Hong Kong. The forum was co-organized by Taiwan-based Taiwan Reform Foundation and Beijing-based Taiwan Research Institute. Before the forum, Hsieh attended a dinner hosted by Tung Chee Hwa, former Chief Executive of Hong Kong on Friday evening.

Hsieh said that mutual trust between DPP and Beijing was important and that all of the bilateral exchanges between the two sides of the Taiwan Strait should benefit the public and address their needs. He also added that rebalancing cross-strait interactions is important as well. He once again reiterated his 'constitutions with different interpretations' view that Taipei and Beijing can coexist if both sides respect each other's constitutional legitimacy.

== ROC representative to Japan ==
In March 2016, local media began reporting that Hsieh had accepted a position as Taiwan's representative to Japan in Tsai Ing-wen's administration. He announced the appointment in late April, and made his first official visit to Japan on June 9. Ko Shu-ling of the Kyodo News wrote favorably of Hsieh's appointment, stating that the focus on Cross-Strait and Taiwan–United States relations under previous administrations seemed to be rolled back in favor of a "southward" policy, a goal of the Tsai presidency. Hsieh has discussed the possible lifting of Taiwanese restrictions on imports from Fukushima Prefecture, which had been put in place as a result of the 2011 Tōhoku earthquake and tsunami, the cause of meltdowns at the Fukushima Daiichi nuclear power plant. Hsieh left his post in mid-August 2024, and is to be replaced by Lee I-yang.

== Personal life ==
Hsieh is married to Yu Fang-chih (游芳枝). A native of Taipei, she graduated from Taipei First Girls' High School and, like Hsieh, attended law school at National Taiwan University, where the two were classmates. Together, they have a daughter and a son, who served in the military on Tungyin Island (Dongyin) and has served as Taipei City councilor since 2014. Hsieh's mother died in 2007.

Hsieh and nine other Democratic Progressive Party politicians performed traditional Taiwanese songs on a re-release of the album Oh! Formosa in 2000. He later learned to play the ocarina, and released his own album in 2005.

Hsieh first claimed part-aboriginal descent in 2005, and stated that he enjoyed Bunun music.

Hsieh is fluent in Japanese. He is a devout Buddhist.

== Honours ==
- Grand Cordon of the Order of the Rising Sun (2025)

Political offices
Preceded by Wu Den-yih	Mayor of Kaohsiung; 1998–2005	Succeeded by Chen Chi-mai; Acting
Preceded by Yu Shyi-kun	President of the Executive Yuan; 2005–2006	Succeeded by Su Tseng-chang
Party political offices
Preceded by Lin Yi-hsiung	Chairperson of the DPP; 2000–2002	Succeeded by Chen Shui-bian
Preceded by Chen Shui-bian	Chairperson of the DPP; Acting; 2008	Succeeded by Tsai Ing-wen
Preceded by Chen Shui-bian	DPP nominee for President of the Republic of China; 2008	Succeeded by Tsai Ing-wen
Diplomatic posts
Preceded by Shen Ssu-tsun	ROC Representative to Japan; 2016–present	Incumbent
