= You Si-kun =

Premier of the Republic of China from 2002 to 2005

You Si-kun MLY
- 游錫堃
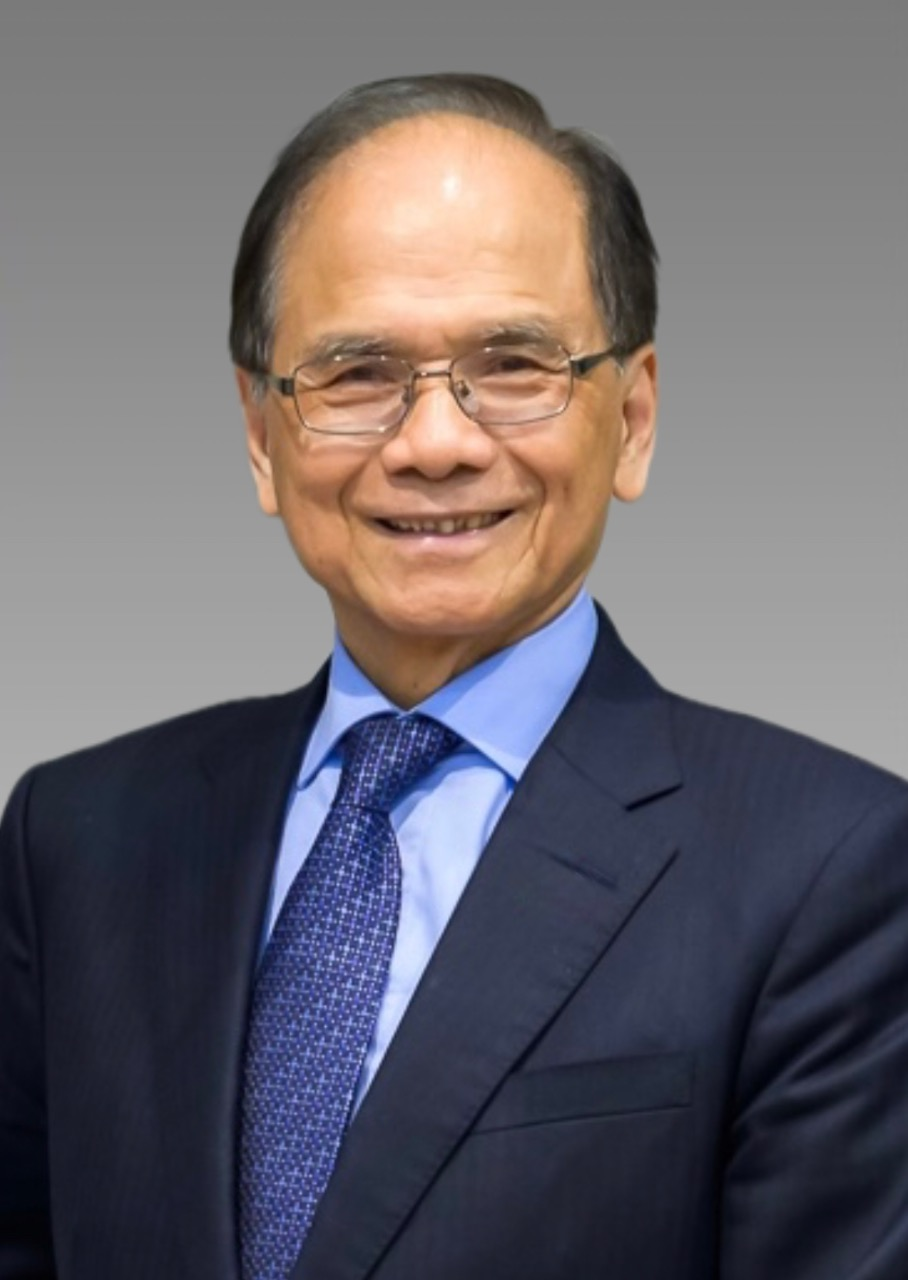
- Official portrait, 2023

12th President of the Legislative Yuan
- In office 1 February 2020 – 1 February 2024
- Vice President: Tsai Chi-chang
- Preceded by: Su Jia-chyuan
- Succeeded by: Han Kuo-yu

15th Premier of Taiwan
- In office 1 February 2002 – 1 February 2005
- President: Chen Shui-bian
- Vice Premier: Lin Hsin-yi; Yeh Chu-lan
- Preceded by: Chang Chun-hsiung
- Succeeded by: Frank Hsieh

11th Chairman of the Democratic Progressive Party
- In office 15 January 2006 – 21 September 2007 (Note: Acting by Chai Trong-rong from 14 March 2007 to 8 May 2007)
- Secretary General: Lin Chia-lung
- Preceded by: Annette Lu (acting)
- Succeeded by: Chen Shui-bian

16th Vice Premier of Taiwan
- In office 20 May 2000 – 27 July 2000
- Premier: Tang Fei
- Preceded by: Liu Chao-shiuan
- Succeeded by: Chang Chun-hsiung

7th Magistrate of Yilan
- In office 20 December 1989 – 20 December 1997
- Preceded by: Chen Ding-nan
- Succeeded by: Liu Shou-ch'eng

Member of the Legislative Yuan
- In office 1 February 2020 – 2 February 2024
- Succeeded by: Wang Cheng-hsu
- Constituency: Party-list

Member of the Provincial Assembly
- In office 20 December 1981 – 20 December 1989
- Constituency: Yilan County

Personal details
- Born: 25 April 1948 (age 78) Dongshan, Taipei County, Taiwan
- Party: Democratic Progressive Party (1986–present)
- Other political affiliations: Chinese Youth Party (1966–1975)
- Spouse: Yang Pao-yu
- Education: National Chung Hsing University (LLB); Tunghai University (BA)

Chinese name
- Traditional Chinese: 游錫堃
- Simplified Chinese: 游锡堃
Transcriptions
Standard Mandarin
- Hanyu Pinyin: Yóu Xíkūn
- Bopomofo: ㄧㄡˊ ㄒㄧˊㄎㄨㄣ
- Gwoyeu Romatzyh: You Shyi-kuen
- Wade–Giles: Yu^{2} Hsi^{2}-k'un^{1}
- Tongyong Pinyin: Yóu Sí-kun
- IPA: [jǒʊ ɕǐkʰwə́n]
Southern Min
- Hokkien POJ: Iû Sek-khun
- Tâi-lô: Iû Sik-khun

You Si-kun (Chinese: 游錫堃; born 25 April 1948), also romanized Yu Shyi-kun, is a Taiwanese politician. He was one of the founding members of the Democratic Progressive Party (DPP), and is known to be a strong advocate of Taiwan independence. He led the DPP as chairman from 2006 to 2007 and served as Premier from 2002 to 2005.

== Personal background ==
Born in Taihe Village (太和村), Dongshan Township, Yilan County, You was raised in a poor tenant farming family. While he was a 13-year-old student at Taiwan Provincial Yilan High School, his house was destroyed by flood waters during typhoon Pamela and his father died of tuberculosis in the same year. As a result, he quit junior high school to work full-time on his family farm.

At 19, he enrolled in supplementary night school at Lotung Commercial and Vocational High School. He moved to Taipei to enroll in the supplementary Hsihu Commercial and Industrial High School. He studied international commerce at the Chihlee Institute of Technology and public administration at National Chung Hsing University, where he earned a law degree. He later graduated from Tunghai University in 1985 at the age of 37 with a Bachelor of Arts in political science.

== Rise in politics ==
In 1981, he was elected a member of the Taiwan Provincial Assembly for Yilan County. You, Su Tseng-chang, and Hsieh San-sheng made the so-called "iron triangle" in the Assembly. The three were the only members ever to resign from the Assembly.

From 1983 to 1984 he was the Tangwai Secretary-General. He became Convener of Tangwai National Election Backing Committee in 1986. As a founding member of the Democratic Progressive Party, he was a member of its Central Committee from 1984 to 1986 and its Central Standing Committee from 1986 to 1990 when he was elected the Magistrate of Yilan County, during which he was a member of the Educational Reform Committee of the Executive Yuan from 1994 to 1996. In his second term as magistrate, Environmental Protection (環保立縣), Tourism (觀光立縣), Information Promotion (資訊立縣), and Culture (文化立縣) were his four main goals in administration. After the completion of his two terms as magistrate in 1997, he was in 1998 appointed Chairman of the Taipei Rapid Transit Corporation by then Mayor Chen Shui-bian. He resigned in 1999 to become Secretary-General of the Democratic Progressive Party.

He was the chief spokesman for the DPP campaign in the 2000 presidential election. With Chen Shui-bian's election to the presidency, he was appointed Vice Premier under Premier Tang Fei.

In July 2000, four construction workers were trapped by the rising floodwaters of Pachang Creek. As local and central government authorities squabbled for three hours over who would send out a rescue helicopter, the men drowned. In the public outrage that ensued, officials up the chain of command, including Premier Tang, tendered their resignations. Vice Premier You, who was also chairman of the Committee of Disaster Relief and Prevention, had his resignation accepted.

Six months later, You rejoined the administration as Secretary-General to the Office of the President and served until his promotion to the premiership on 1 February 2002.

== Premiership ==
As premier, You defended the administration's position on the peace referendum and promoted a NT$610.8 billion arms procurement package in 2004. He caused some minor controversy when he used the designation "Taiwan, ROC" on an official visit to Honduras. Chen later said he preferred "Taiwan." In September 2004, he directed the government to refer to the People's Republic of China in official documents as simply "China" as opposed to "mainland China" or "Communist China" as was previously done in order to highlight a "separate Taiwanese identity." This move was not endorsed by the Presidential Office and the Mainland Affairs Council clarified that it would only apply to internal documents.

You and his cabinet resigned en masse following the pan-Green Coalition failure to gain a majority in the 2004 legislative elections. In the ensuing cabinet shuffle, You was returned to the presidential office as secretary-general and succeeded as premier by Frank Hsieh.

On 15 January 2006 he was elected chairman of the Democratic Progressive Party with 54% of the vote.

You was a candidate for the DPP nomination for the 2008 presidential election, competing against Frank Hsieh, Su Tseng-chang, and Annette Lu. He finished third in the first round of the primary and subsequently withdrew along with the other trailing candidates, paving the way for the leading candidate Hsieh to win the nomination without a need for a second round which would have been based on opinion polling.

== Corruption charges and acquittal ==
On 21 September 2007, You, along with Vice President Annette Lu and National Security Office secretary-general Mark Chen, were separately indicted on charges of corruption by the Supreme Prosecutor's Office of Taiwan. You was accused of embezzlement and special fund abuse of about US$70,000. He resigned his post as chairperson of the Democratic Progressive Party later that day. On 2 July 2012, all three were acquitted of all charges.

== 2014 New Taipei City mayoralty election ==
On 29 November 2014, You lost the New Taipei City mayoralty election to his opponent Eric Chu of the Kuomintang.

2014 New Taipei City Mayoral Election Result
No.	Candidate	Party	Votes	Percentage
1	You Si-kun	DPP	934,774	48.78%
2	Li Chin-shun (李進順)	Independent	22,207	1.16%
3	Eric Chu	KMT	959,302	50.06%

== Later political career ==
You was elected to the Legislative Yuan in 2020, securing an at-large seat on behalf of the Democratic Progressive Party. He was elected President of the Legislative Yuan on February 1, 2020, defeating Kuomintang lawmaker Lai Shyh-bao and succeeding Su Jia-chyuan. Speaking at the 2020 Taipei Traditional Chinese Medicine International Forum on July 5, 2020, You Si-kun suggested renaming Chinese medicine as "Taiwanese". On November 5, 2021, You was sanctioned by the Taiwan Affairs Office of the People's Republic of China as a "diehard "Taiwan independence" separatist" for "fanning up hostility across the Taiwan Strait and maliciously smearing the mainland".

You reelected to the Legislative Yuan in 2024, again via party list proportional representation, and ran for a second speakership term. He lost the office to Han Kuo-yu and subsequently resigned from the 11th Legislative Yuan.

== Personal life ==
You is the founder of Kavalan Journal (噶瑪蘭雜誌), which is named after the Kavalan Taiwanese aborigines.

He married Yang Pao-yu in 1978, with whom he has two sons. His mother, Huang Shou-chu, died in December 2002.

== Notes ==
Political offices
Preceded by Chen Ding-nan	Magistrate of Yilan County; 1989–1997	Succeeded by Liu Shou-cheng
Preceded by Chang Chun-hsiung	Premier of the Republic of China; 2002–2005	Succeeded by Frank Hsieh
Preceded by Su Chia-chyuan	President of the Legislative Yuan; 2020-2024	Succeeded by Incumbent
Party political offices
Preceded by Annette Lu (acting)	Chairperson of the Democratic Progressive Party; 2006–2007	Succeeded by Chai Trong-rong (acting)
