= Presidency of Tsai Ing-wen =

2016–2024 ROC presidential administration

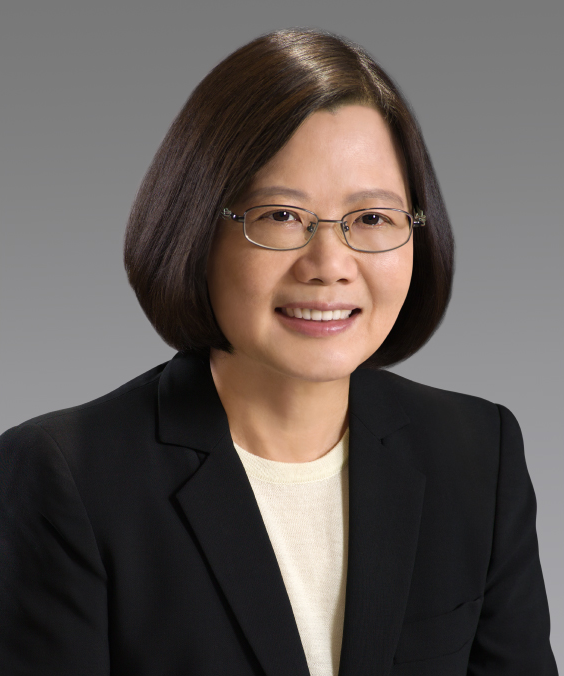
- Presidency of Tsai Ing-wen; 20 May 2016 – 20 May 2024
- President: Tsai Ing-wen
- Vice President: Chen Chien-jen; William Lai
- Premier: Lin Chuan; William Lai; Su Tseng-chang; Chen Chien-jen
- Cabinet: Lin, Lai, Su II, Chen
- Party: Democratic Progressive Party (DPP)
- Election: 2016; 2020
- Seat: Yonghe Residence, Zhongzheng, Taipei

The presidency of Tsai Ing-wen officially began on 20 May 2016 when Tsai Ing-wen was inaugurated as the seventh president of the Republic of China (Taiwan). Tsai, a member of the Democratic Progressive Party, took office following her landslide victory in the 2016 presidential election over Kuomintang opponent Eric Chu and People First opponent James Soong. Four years later, in the 2020 election, Tsai defeated KMT nominee Han Kuo-yu for a second term. Tsai is the first woman to be elected as president of Taiwan, first unmarried president, and first president to be of both Hakka and aboriginal descent (a quarter Paiwan from her grandmother). She is the first President to have never held an elected executive post before serving as president, the first to be popularly elected without having previously served as the Mayor of Taipei, and the second President from the Democratic Progressive Party, following Chen Shui-bian. Term-limited after two terms, the presidency of Tsai was succeeded by the presidency of William Lai on 20 May 2024. According to opinion polls, her approval rating exceeded 50 percent at the end of her term, marking the first such case in Taiwan’s democratic era.

== Transition, Inauguration and Administration ==
Former Finance Minister Lin Chuan was selected as a co-convener of Tsai's transition team set up to manage the transfer of power from the outgoing Ma Ying-jeou administration. On 15 March 2016, president-elect Tsai named Lin premier. He was confirmed by the Legislative Yuan soon after and took office on 20 May 2016. Chen Chien-jen, who served as Tsai's running mate in the 2016 election, took office as vice-president the same day.

In the inauguration speech for her first term, Tsai stated policy goals such as pension reform, long-term care for the elderly, transitional justice, and judicial reform. She outlined an economic policy of diversification via the New Southbound Policy as well as prioritization of innovative industries. In terms of cross-strait policy, she acknowledged the 1992 Consensus without agreeing to it and called for continued cross-strait dialogue.

In her second inauguration speech, Tsai outlined her major goals in her second term, including instituting a lay judge system, lowering the voting age from 20 to 18, and establishing a human rights commission under the Control Yuan. She also outlined her economic policy, which included transitioning from manufacturing to high-tech industries, with a focus on existing semiconductor and information and communications technology industries, cybersecurity, biotechnology and healthcare, domestic production of military equipment, green energy and strategically-critical industries. She proposed goals for defense reform, including a focus on asymmetric warfare, maintenance of a military reserve force, and reform in management to reflect a democratic society. On cross-strait issues, she explicitly rejected the one country, two systems model proposed by Beijing and expressed a desire for both sides to coexist peacefully.

=== Administration ===
| Title | Picture | Name | Political party | Term | Deputy | Notes |
|---|---|---|---|---|---|---|
| President | | Tsai Ing-wen | Democratic Progressive Party | 20 May 2016 – 20 May 2024 | Not applicable | |
| Vice President | | Chen Chien-jen | Independent | 20 May 2016 – 20 May 2020 | Not applicable | |
| Vice President | | Lai Ching-te | Democratic Progressive Party | 20 May 2020 – 20 May 2024 | Not applicable | |
| Secretary-General to the President | | Lin Bih-jaw | Kuomintang | 20 May 2016 – 19 October 2016 | Not applicable | |
| Secretary-General to the President | | Liu Chien-sin | Democratic Progressive Party | 20 October 2016 – 17 May 2017 | Not applicable | |
| Secretary-General to the President | | Joseph Wu | Democratic Progressive Party | 18 May 2017 – 26 February 2018 | Not applicable | |
| Secretary-General to the President | | Liu Chien-sin | Democratic Progressive Party | 26 February 2018 – 23 April 2018 | | |
| Secretary-General to the President | | Chen Chu | Democratic Progressive Party | 23 April 2018 – 20 May 2020 | | |
| Secretary-General to the President | | Su Jia-chyuan | Democratic Progressive Party | 20 May 2020 – 2 August 2020 | | |
| Secretary-General to the President | | Liu Chien-sin | Democratic Progressive Party | 2 August 2020 – 3 August 2020 | | |
| Secretary-General to the President | | David Lee | Kuomintang | 3 August 2020 – 31 January 2023 | Special-appointed Deputy Secretary-General: (Unavailable, to be appointed); Deputy Secretary-General: Li Junyi (Democratic Progressive Party) | |
| Secretary-General to the President | | Lin Chia-lung | Democratic Progressive Party | 31 January 2023 – 20 May 2024 | | |
| Secretary General of the National Security Council | | Wellington Koo | Democratic Progressive Party | 20 May 2020 – 20 May 2024 | Deputy Secretary-General: Chen Wenzheng (Democratic Progressive Party), Xu Sijian; advisory members: Fu Dongcheng, Chen Junlin, Guo Linwu, Li Hanming, Chen Mingqi | |
| Director of the National Security Bureau | | Tsai Ming-yen | Not applicable | 31 January 2023 – 20 May 2024 | Deputy Director: Ke Chengheng (Democratic Progressive Party), Chen Wenfan, Hu Muyuan | |
| Spokesperson for the presidential palace | | Lin Yu-chan, Gao Zun | Democratic Progressive Party | 31 January 2023 – 20 May 2024 | | |
| Curator of National History Museum | | Chen Yi-shen | Democratic Progressive Party | 5 July 2019 – 20 May 2024 | Deputy Director: He Zhilin | |
| Dean of Academia Sinica | | James C. Liao | Not applicable | 21 June 2016 | Deputy Deans: Chou Mei-yin, Liu Fu-tong, Huang Chin-shing | Deputies are not appointed by the president, but are recommended by the academician conference. Liao Junzhi recommended the first candidate for the academician conference. Fixed term system, five-year term |

=== Cabinets (Executive Yuan) ===
| Succession | Picture | Name | Political party | Term | Vice-Premier | Notes |
|---|---|---|---|---|---|---|
| 1 | | Lin Chuan | Not applicable | 20 May 2016 – 3 September 2017 | Lin Hsi-yao | |
| 2 | | Lai Ching-te | Democratic Progressive Party | 8 September 2017 – 11 January 2019 | Shih Jun-ji | |
| 3 | | Su Tseng-chang | Democratic Progressive Party | 14 January 2019 – 31 January 2023 | Shen Jong-chin | |
| 4 | | Chen Chien-jen | Democratic Progressive Party | 31 January 2023 – 20 May 2024 | Cheng Wen-tsan | |

== Policies and actions ==
=== Defense policy and indigenous programs ===
Under the Tsai administration, military spending has risen in Taiwan relative to GDP. The defense budget was set to $327 billion NTD in 2018 and $346 billion in 2019. The defense budget in 2020 was set to $411 billion NTD, estimated to be 2.3% of GDP, representing an 8.3% increase in total spending over the previous year and a 0.2% increase in percentage of GDP. The administration has also focused on defensive self-sufficiency and developing indigenous industries, such as in submarines and missiles. The AIDC T-5 Brave Eagle indigenous jet trainer, which started development in 2017, successfully conducted its first test flight in 2020. On 29 June 2020, Tsai announced measures to shore up Taiwan's military reserves, including assigning them the same combat gear as active servicemembers and synchronization of mobilization. The first domestically-produced rapid mine-laying ship was delivered on 4 August 2020, and construction on an indigenous diesel submarine began in November 2020. The navy's first indigenous amphibious transport dock was launched on April 13, 2021; named Yu Shan after the mountain with the same name and built by CSBC, it will replace the aging ROCN Hsu Hai (formerly the USS Pensacola).

On 11 March 2022, a special force soldier wrote to Tsai, reporting that insufficient basic logistic supply compelled combatants to purchase equipment from outsider suppliers at their own expense for two years, then being disqualified as non-standard upon inspection, in contrast of the reserve trainees receiving new sets; and appealed to abolish the mandatory diary writing for examination. The classified "2022006470" document was somehow illegally leaked from the presidential palace to the media with his identity exposed on 18 March, then Minister of National Defense, Chiu Kuo-cheng reacted: "I will not let him get away with it", "Fix the crying baby!"; but later clarified after being questioned by the parliament members in the Legislative Yuan, that he just disgusts the coward behavior behind his back, and the critique unfair to the preparatory staff. The case raised the society concern on the standard operating procedure practice on the data security breach to the presidential office.

=== Cross strait policy ===
During her first inauguration speech, Tsai acknowledged that the talks surrounding the 1992 Consensus took place without agreeing that a consensus was reached. She credited the talks with spurring 20 years of dialogue and exchange between the two sides. She hoped that exchanges would continue on the basis of these historical facts, as well as the existence of the Republic of China constitutional system and democratic will of the Taiwanese people. In response, Beijing called Tsai's answer an "incomplete test paper" because Tsai did not agree to the content of the 1992 Consensus. On 25 June 2016, Beijing suspended official cross-strait communications, with any remaining cross-strait exchanges thereafter taking place through unofficial channels.

On 10 October 2016 (the ROC's National Day), Tsai stated the New Four Noes: "our pledges will not change, and our goodwill will not change; but we will not bow to pressure, and we will of course not revert to the old path of confrontation".

In January 2019, Xi Jinping, General Secretary of the Chinese Communist Party wrote an open letter to Taiwan proposing a one country, two systems formula for eventual unification. Tsai responded to Xi in a January 2019 speech by stating that Taiwan rejects "one country, two systems" and that because Beijing equates the 1992 Consensus with "one country, two systems", Taiwan rejects the 1992 Consensus as well. Tsai rejected one country, two systems explicitly again in her second inauguration speech, and reaffirmed her previous stance that cross-strait exchanges be held on the basis of parity between the two sides. She further remarked that cross-strait relations had reached a "historical turning point."

During Tsai's administration, ten countries severed official ties with the ROC and switched diplomatic recognition to the PRC.

=== Energy policy ===
The Tsai administration has stated an electricity supply goal of 20% from renewables, 30% from coal and 50% from liquefied natural gas by 2025.

==== Green energy ====
Bills under the umbrella of the Forward-Looking Infrastructure initiative have been used to fund green energy initiatives. The administration plans to install 1,000 wind turbines on land and offshore and has contracted Ørsted of Denmark to install 900 MW of capacity and wpd of Germany to install 1 GW of capacity. Taiwan's first offshore wind farm, Formosa I, consisting of 22 wind turbines expected to produce 128 MW of electric power, is slated to begin operations at the end of 2019. The government also purchased 520 MW of solar capacity in 2017 and more than 1 GW in 2018; total capacity was 2.8 GW at the end of 2018, with the government planning to deploy an addition 1.5 GW of solar energy in 2019 and 2.2 GW in 2020.

==== Break-up of Taipower ====
The government approved amendments to the Electricity Act on 20 October 2016 to break up the state-owned monopoly Taipower into subsidiaries and further liberalize the power sector by allowing companies to sell electricity to users directly rather than selling through Taipower. In particular, the generation and distribution divisions of Taipower are to be separated. Amongst the stated motivations for liberalisation was to allow for the direct purchase of green energy by consumers. The plan also included emissions controls, the creation of a regulatory agency, mandatory reserve margins (waived for start-up green energy companies), and measures for price stabilization. The plan was met with protests by Taipower employees.

==== Nuclear energy ====
Tsai campaigned on a promise to make Taiwan nuclear-free by 2025, which was codified into law on 11 January 2017 via amendments to the Electricity Act. An energy blackout due to an unrelated operational mistake have led some to question the nuclear phase-out. According to the results of the 2018 referendum, this provision was abolished on 7 May 2019. Nonetheless, the administration has maintained a goal of phasing out nuclear energy.

=== Forward-looking infrastructure ===
On 5 July 2017, the first Forward-Looking Infrastructure Bill passed the Legislative Yuan. The bill provided $420 billion NTD in funds over a period of 4 years toward infrastructure projects in light-rail infrastructure, water supply infrastructure, flood control measures, and green energy, talent development, urban and rural infrastructure, digital infrastructure and food safety. Other projects include improving road safety and aesthetics, locally oriented industrial parks, recreation centers, bicycle paths, and public service centers for long-term care.

=== Judicial reform ===
The Tsai administration proposed a lay judge system modelled after Japan's over a jury system proposed by the New Power Party. The Citizen Judges Act was passed on July 22, 2020, instituting a lay judge system with three professional judges along six lay judges. The law is set to take effect in 2023.

=== Labour reform ===
On 1 January 2017, the amended Labour Standards Law (commonly referred to as 一例一休), which was passed on 6 December 2016 by the legislature, took effect. The amendments stipulated, with some exceptions, a 40-hour five-day work week with one compulsory rest day and one flexible rest day. On the flexible rest day, workers may work for overtime pay, and the compulsory rest day guaranteed that workers could not work more than six days in a row. The amendments also reduced the number of national holidays from 19 to 12, eliminating Youth Day, Teachers’ Day, Retrocession Day, Chiang Kai-shek's birthday, Sun Yat-sen's birthday, Constitution Day and the day following New Year's Day. Prior to the amendments, the Labor Standards Act stipulated a maximum of 84 hours of work in any given 14 day period. The amendments were met with protests from labor groups, who opposed the reduction of national holidays and demanded that work on flexible rest days should result in compensatory vacation days in addition to overtime pay.

After taking effect, the amendments were criticized for their lack of flexibility, resulting in a net decrease in total pay and an increase in cost of living, and for having an overly complicated scheme for calculating overtime pay, leading the administration to further revise the Labor Standards Act. On 1 March 2018, the second revision of the Labor Standards Act came into effect. The revisions relaxed the previous regulations by stipulating two compulsory rest days for each 14 day period rather than one compulsory rest day for each 7 day period, meaning that workers could work for 12 days in a row. The revisions also simplified the formula for overtime pay. The revisions were met with protests and hunger strikes by labor groups.

=== National languages ===
The Tsai administration took actions to preserve languages facing a crisis of inheritance and to put them on more equal footing to Mandarin. Previously, the only national language was Mandarin; during her administration, the national languages of Taiwan were eventually broadened to include Mandarin, Taiwanese Hokkien, Hakka, 16 indigenous Formosan languages, Taiwanese Sign Language and the Matsu dialect of Eastern Min spoken on the Matsu Islands.

The Indigenous Languages Development Act took effect on 14 June 2017, designating 16 indigenous Formosan languages as national languages. Hakka was made a national language via amendments to the Hakka Basic Act on 29 December 2017. On 25 December 2018, the sweeping National Languages Development Act passed the legislature, creating broadcast services for each national language of Taiwan, guaranteeing access to public services in each language, and introducing elective language classes in primary schools. The act also directed the government to work with civic groups to create standard orthographies for each national language, and to develop a plan for preserving and revitalizing threatened languages. It furthermore automatically designated, in Article 3, all languages of all ethnic groups in Taiwan as national languages, thus clearing the way for Taiwanese Hokkien, Taiwanese Sign Language, and the Matsu dialect to become national languages.

On 15 August 2019, the government amended the Enforcement Rules of the Passport Act to allow for the use of romanizations of names in any national language (Hakka, Hoklo or indigenous languages) in passports.

On 27 September 2021, after having followed the regulation to applied in advance the real-time interpretation service and 3 Taiwanese interpreter had been present ready at site, Legislator Chen Po-wei of the Taiwan Statebuilding Party, proceeded his scheduled questioning session in Taiwanese during the Foreign and National Defense Committee. The Minister of National Defense Chiu Kuo-cheng did not accept the interpreter's assistance at site, but insisted to bring the deputy minister Zong-hsiao Li as his own interpreter. Chiu repeatedly interrupted the question process by asking Chen to speak Mandarin Chinese for easier communication, or the session time cannot be lengthened to accommodate the interpretation, but Li is not a linguistic professional, hence his translation contains contextual errors, so Chairman Legislator Chen I-hsin intervened during the heated argument and tried to introduce the existing real-time synchronized interpretation on progress at site as the solution same as the common conference practice in the other countries, but Chiu still insisted his way Chen later apologized to the public for the good intention of practicing the national language law being turned into a linguistic communication tragedy, and condemned Chiu for "bullying" (鴨霸), but Chiu denied the allegation and claimed that a language is a tool of communication. The parliamentary interpretation service were temporarily suspended afterwards pending on better communication in the future - consequently the other parliament members and media editorials such as Kuan Bi-ling and Taipei Times commented that Language is not just a tool of communication (as Chiu said), but also an identity of feelings and culture. Councilor Miao Poya also explained that the multi-lingual working environment is essential for a healthy mind without the "Chinese Language Supremacy" (華語至上) attitude to achieve the international level in diversity, equality and mutual respect for a modern state.

=== New Southbound Policy ===
The New Southbound Policy was launched on 5 September 2016 with the intent to make Taiwan less dependent on Mainland China and to improve Taiwan's cooperation with other countries. The 18 countries the New Southbound Policy targeted for increased cooperation are: Thailand, Indonesia, Philippines, Malaysia, Singapore, Brunei, Vietnam, Myanmar, Cambodia, Laos, India, Pakistan, Bangladesh, Nepal, Sri Lanka, Bhutan, Australia and New Zealand. The policy designated areas of cooperation in trade, technology, agriculture, medicine, education, and tourism. In mid-2019, the Taiwanese government announced that since the implementation of the policy, bilateral trade between Taiwan and the targeted countries increased by 22%, while investment by targeted countries increased by 60%. Further, the number of medical patients from targeted countries increased by 50%, the number of visitors increased by 58%, and the number of students increased by 52%. During the COVID-19 pandemic, Taiwan donated 1 million masks to countries targeted in the New Southbound Policy.

=== Pension reform ===
International observers have noted that Taiwan's pre-reform pension system was due to default by 2030 for civil servants and 2020 for the military. Pension reform was passed via two separate bills, one dealing with civil servants and schoolteachers on 27 June 2017 and another dealing with military veterans on 20 June 2018. On 1 July 2018, the pension reforms came into effect. Civil servants, upon retirement, have a choice between receiving pensions in monthly instalments subject to a preferential interest rate or via a lump sum. Under the reforms, the previous preferential interest rate for those who opted for monthly instalments would be gradually reduced from 18% to 0% over the span of 30 months. Civil servants who opted for a lump sum would see their interest rates decreased from 18% to 6% over a period of 6 years. The reforms were estimated to affect 63,000 military veterans, 130,000 public servants and 140,000 schoolteachers. The reforms simultaneously set minimum monthly pensions for schoolteachers and civil servants at $32,160 NTD and for military veterans at $38,990 NTD. The reforms also raised the minimum retirement age to 60 from 55, to increase by 1 per year until the retirement age reaches 65. Though the reforms were met with protests from government retirees and veterans, polls have shown that the majority of Taiwanese are satisfied with the outcome of the pension reforms. After a legal challenge by the KMT, the Constitutional Court found most of the pension reform constitutional, while striking down clauses regarding the suspension of pensions for retirees that took jobs later in the private sector.

=== Same-sex marriage and LGBT rights ===
On 24 May 2017, the Constitutional Court ruled that the constitutional right to equality and freedom of marriage guarantees same-sex couples the right to marry under the Constitution of the Republic of China. The ruling (Judicial Yuan Interpretation No. 748) gave the Legislative Yuan two years to bring the marriage laws into compliance, after which registration of such marriages would come into force automatically. Following the ruling, progress on implementing a same-sex marriage law was slow due to government inaction and strong opposition from some conservative people and Christian groups. In November 2018, the Taiwanese electorate passed referendums to prevent recognition of same-sex marriages in the Civil Code and to restrict teaching about LGBT issues. The Government responded by confirming that the Court's ruling would be implemented and that the referendums could not support laws contrary to the Constitution.

On 20 February 2019, a draft bill entitled the Act for Implementation of J.Y. Interpretation No. 748 (Note: Also translated as the Enforcement Act of Judicial Yuan Interpretation No. 748.) was released. The draft bill would grant same-sex married couples almost all the rights available to heterosexual married couples under the Civil Code, with the exception that it only allows adoption of a child genetically related to one of them. The Executive Yuan passed it the following day, sending it to the Legislative Yuan for fast-tracked review. The bill was passed on 17 May, signed by the President on 22 May and took effect on 24 May 2019 (the last day possible under the Court's ruling).

=== Transitional justice and ill-gotten assets ===
The Act on Promoting Transitional Justice (促進轉型正義條例) was passed by the Legislative Yuan on 5 December 2017. The act sought to rectify injustices committed by the authoritarian Kuomintang government of the Republic of China on Taiwan, and to this end established the Transitional Justice Commission to investigate actions taken from 15 August 1945, the date of the Hirohito surrender broadcast, to 6 November 1992, when president Lee Teng-hui lifted the Temporary Provisions against the Communist Rebellion for Fujian Province, Republic of China, ending the period of mobilization. This time period, in particular, includes the February 28 Incident as well as White Terror. The committee's main aims include: making political archives more readily available, removing authoritarian symbols, redressing judicial injustice, and producing a report on the history of the period which delineates steps to further promote transitional justice. Thus far, the commission has exonerated political criminals from the martial law era, made recommendations on the removal of authoritarian symbols, and declassified government documents from the martial law era.

The Act Governing the Handling of Ill-gotten Properties by Political Parties and Their Affiliate Organizations was passed in July and Wellington Koo, one of the main authors of the Act, was named as the committee chairman in August. With the establishment of the committee, the KMT has insisted that it has been illegally and unconstitutionally persecuted and that the investigation is a political witch hunt. However, the ruling Democratic Progressive Party (DPP) maintained that the means are necessary for achieving transitional justice and leveling the playing field for all political parties. Thus far, the committee has determined that the China Youth Corps, Central Motion Picture Corp., National Women's League, and the Broadcasting Corporation of China were KMT-affiliated organizations and either froze their assets or ordered them to forfeit them.

== See also ==
- List of international presidential trips made by Tsai Ing-wen
