= Presidency of Lai Ching-te =

ROC presidential administration since 2024

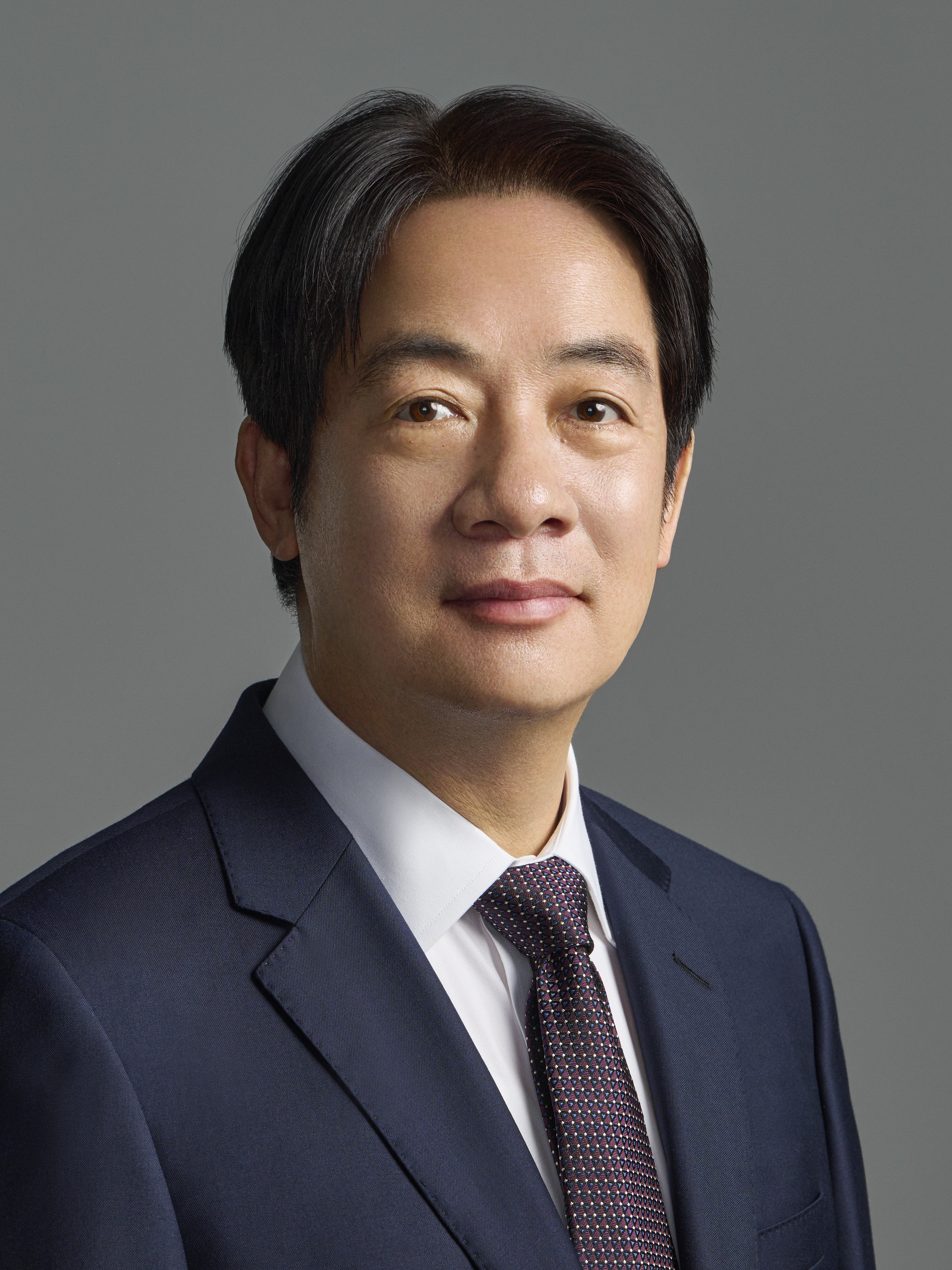
- Presidency of Lai Ching-te; 20 May 2024 – present
- President: Lai Ching-te
- Vice President: Hsiao Bi-khim
- Premier: Cho Jung-tai
- Cabinet: Cho
- Party: Democratic Progressive Party (DPP)
- Election: 2024
- Seat: Wanli Residence, Zhongzheng, Taipei

The presidency of Lai Ching-te began on 20 May 2024, when Lai Ching-te was sworn in as 16th president of the Republic of China and the eighth president of the republic since it became established on the island of Taiwan, succeeding Tsai Ing-wen. Lai and running mate Hsiao Bi-khim won the 2024 presidential election with 5.58 million votes, breaking the practice of two-term political party rotation with the Kuomintang since the first direct presidential election in 1996, and retaining the presidency for the Democratic Progressive Party for a record consecutive third term. However, unlike the previous two-term presidency of Tsai Ing-wen, the DPP failed to obtain a majority of seats in the Legislative Yuan alone, making Lai Ching-te's government the second minority government since Taiwan's democratisation.

Lai is the third incumbent vice president of Taiwan to become president, and the first to assume the office through election instead of a predecessor's death. Hsiao, the former Taiwanese Representative to the United States and a former member of the Legislative Yuan, was sworn in on the same day as vice-president, and become Taiwan's first biracial vice president, having been born in Kobe, Japan to a Taiwanese father and European-American mother.

== Administration ==
Title	Picture	Name	Political party	Term	Deputy	Notes
President		Lai Ching-te	DPP	20 May 2024 – present	Not applicable	
Vice President		Hsiao Bi-khim	DPP	20 May 2024 – present	Not applicable	
Secretary-General to the President		Pan Men-an	DPP	20 May 2024 – present	Ho Chih-wei; Xavier Chang	
Secretary General of the National Security Council		Wu Jau-shieh	DPP	20 May 2024 – present	Lin Fei-fan; Hsu Szu-chien; Liu Te-chin	
Director-General of the National Security Bureau		Tsai Ming-yen	Independent	20 May 2024 – present		
Spokesperson for the presidential palace		Lii Wen, Karen Kuo	DPP, Independent	20 May 2024 – present		
Curator of National History Museum		Chen Yi-shen	DPP	5 July 2019 – 20 May 2024	Deputy Director: He Zhilin	
Dean of Academia Sinica		Liao Chun-Chih	Independent	21 June 2016 – present	Vice Dean: Chin-Shing Huang, Mei-Yin Chou, Tang K. Tang	

=== Cabinets (Executive Yuan) ===
Succession	Picture	Name	Political party	Term	Vice-Premier	Notes
1		Cho Jung-tai	DPP	20 May 2024 – present	Cheng Li-chun	

== See also ==
- List of international presidential trips made by Lai Ching-te
