= Yao Jen-to =

Taiwanese politician

- 姚人多
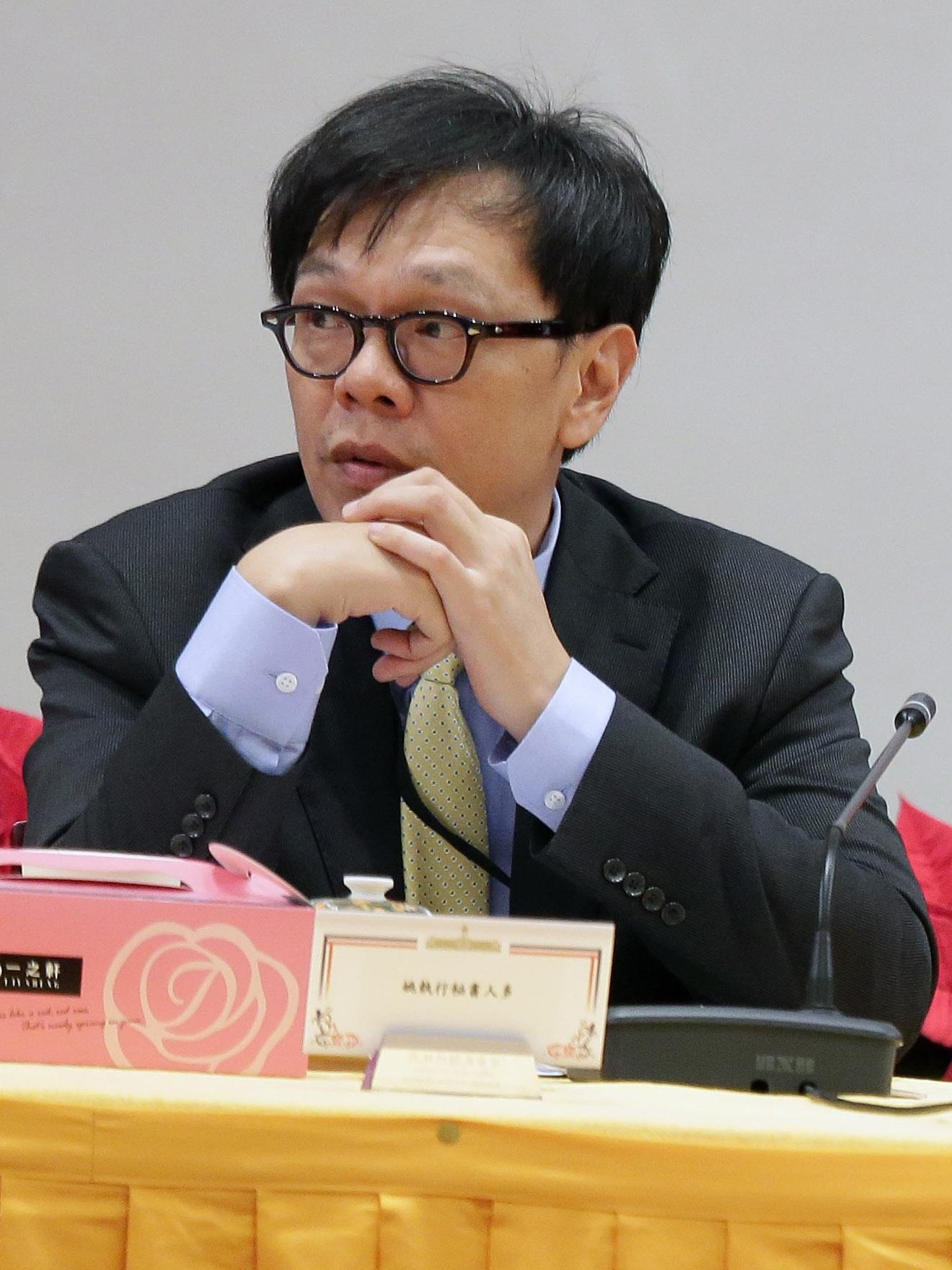

Vice Chairman of Straits Exchange Foundation
- In office 21 June 2018 – 19 May 2020
- Chairperson: Katharine Chang
- Preceded by: Ko Cheng-heng

Secretary-General of Straits Exchange Foundation
- In office 21 June 2018 – 19 May 2020
- Chairperson: Katharine Chang
- Preceded by: Ko Cheng-heng

Deputy Secretary-General to the President
- In office 10 August 2016 – 20 June 2018
- President: Tsai Ing-wen
- Secretary-General: Lin Bih-jaw; Liu Chien-sin (acting); Joseph Wu; Liu Chien-sin (acting); Chen Chu
- Preceded by: Tseng Hou-jen

Personal details
- Born: 12 December 1969 (age 56) Taiwan
- Party: Democratic Progressive Party
- Education: National Taiwan University (BA); University of Essex (PhD)

Yao Jen-to (Chinese: 姚人多; pinyin: Yáo Rénduō; born 12 December 1969) is a Taiwanese sociologist and politician who previously served as the vice chairperson and secretary-general of Straits Exchange Foundation from 21 June 2018 to 19 May 2020. He is currently a professor of sociology at National Tsing Hua University.

== Education ==
Yao graduated from National Taiwan University with a bachelor's degree in sociology. He then completed doctoral studies in the United Kingdom, where he earned his Ph.D. from the University of Essex in 2002. His doctoral dissertation was titled, "Governing the colonised: Governmentality in the Japanese colonisation of Taiwan, 1895-1945".

== Political career ==
Yao had been working as a security adviser to President Tsai Ing-wen when, on 10 August 2016, he was appointed deputy secretary-general of the presidential office. On 20 June 2018 he resigned from the presidential office position and took the role of vice chairperson and secretary-general of Straits Exchange Foundation (SEF) the following day as confirmed by SEF spokesperson.
