= Lin Bih-jaw =

Taiwanese politician

- 林碧炤
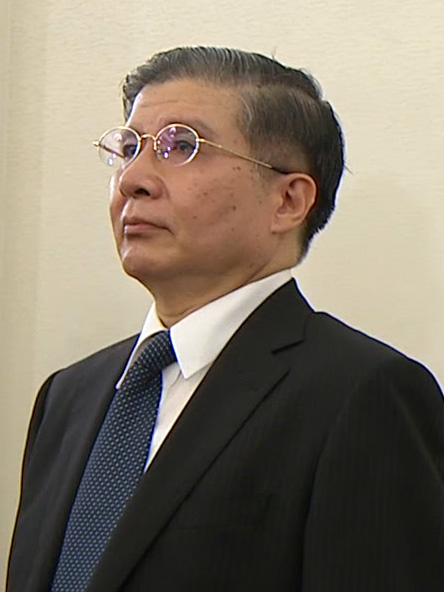
- Lin Bih-jaw in 2016

Secretary-General to the President
- In office 20 May 2016 – 20 October 2016
- President: Tsai Ing-wen
- Deputy: Liu Chien-sin, Tseng Hou-jen; Liu Chien-sin, Yao Jen-to
- Preceded by: Tseng Yung-chuan
- Succeeded by: Liu Chien-sin (acting); Joseph Wu

Deputy Secretary-General to the President
- In office 12 February 1999 – 19 May 2000
- Secretary-General: Huang Kun-huei; John Chiang; Ting Mao-shih

Personal details
- Born: 20 January 1949 (age 77) Taiwan
- Party: Kuomintang
- Education: National Chengchi University (BA); University of Manchester (MA); University of Wales (PhD)

Lin Bih-jaw (Chinese: 林碧炤; pinyin: Lín Bìzhào; born 20 January 1949) is a Taiwanese political scientist and politician who served as the Secretary-General to the President from May to October 2016.

== Education ==
Lin graduated from National Chengchi University with a bachelor's degree in diplomacy in 1970, then completed graduate studies in the United Kingdom. He earned a master's degree in political science from the University of Manchester in 1974 and his Ph.D. in international politics from the University of Wales in 1981.

After receiving his doctorate, Lin became a professor and later the vice president of National Chengchi University.

== Political career ==
Lin was appointed Secretary-General to the President in April 2016, and served under Tsai Ing-wen until 20 October 2016, a day after he had tendered his resignation. He cited his intention to resume writing as the main reason for his resignation.

== Honors ==
- Order of the Rising Sun, 2nd Class, Gold and Silver Star (2020)
