= Tsai Ming-yen =

Tsai Ming-yen may refer to:

- Tsai Ming-yen (judoka)
- Tsai Ming-yen (diplomat)
