= Tsai Ming-yen (diplomat) =

- 蔡明彥
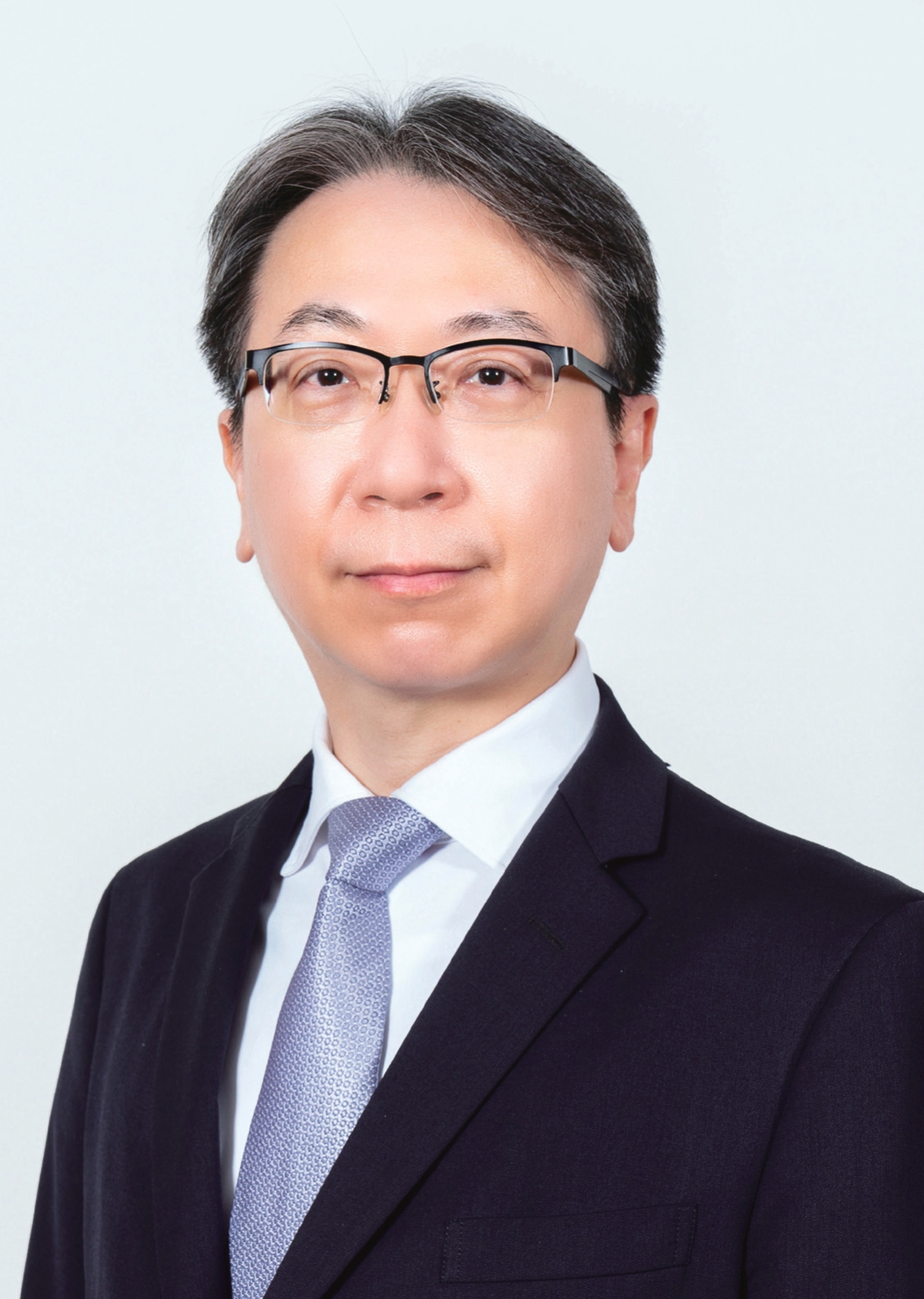
- Official portrait, 2024

20th Director-General of the National Security Bureau
- Incumbent
- Assumed office 31 January 2023
- President: Tsai Ing-wen; Lai Ching-te
- Preceded by: Chen Ming-tong

Deputy Minister of Foreign Affairs
- In office November 2022 – January 2023
- Minister: Joseph Wu

Representative of Taiwan to the European Union and Belgium
- In office June 2020 – October 2022
- Preceded by: Tseng Ho-jen
- Succeeded by: Remus Li-Kuo Chen

Deputy Secretary-General of the National Security Council
- In office June 2017 – June 2020
- Secretary-General: Yen Teh-fa

Personal details
- Born: June 7, 1967 (age 59)
- Education: Soochow University (BA); Tamkang University (MA); King's College London (PhD)
- Scientific career
- Fields: War studies
- Thesis: The Limits of Sino-Russian Military Cooperation after the End of the Cold War (2000)

Tsai Ming-yen (Chinese: 蔡明彥; pinyin: Cài Míngyàn; born June 7, 1967) is a Taiwanese polemologist and diplomat who has served as the director-general of the National Security Bureau since 2023.

== Early life and education ==
Tsai was born on June 7, 1967. He graduated from Soochow University with a Bachelor of Arts in political science, then earned a Master of Arts in Soviet studies in 1993 from Tamkang University, where he wrote a master's thesis on the Soviet arms trade during the leadership of Leonid Brezhnev. His advisor at Tamkang was the political scientist Su Chi.

Tsai completed doctoral studies in England at King's College London, where he earned his Ph.D. in war studies from its Department of War Studies in 2000. His doctoral dissertation was titled, "The Limits of Sino-Russian Military Cooperation after the End of the Cold War".

== Academic career ==
In the early 2000s, Tsai was an associate research fellow within the division of strategic and international studies at the Taiwan Research Institute. By 2005, Tsai had been appointed an assistant professor of international politics at National Chung Hsing University. As an academic, Tsai commented on Cross-Strait relations, China–United States relations, Taiwan–United States relations, and the People's Liberation Army.

== Diplomatic career ==
In June 2017, Tsai took office as deputy secretary-general of the National Security Council, alongside secretary-general Yen Teh-fa. While working at the NSC, Tsai Ming-yen traveled as part of the presidential delegation to Eswatini, Paraguay, and Haiti. He attended APEC Papua New Guinea 2018 as a member of the delegation representing the Tsai Ing-wen presidential administration. In Taiwan, Tsai Ming-yen commented on a meeting Tsai Ing-wen held with Governor of Colorado Jared Polis in July 2019, and led a May 2020 meeting with United States Bureau of East Asian and Pacific Affairs Deputy Assistant Secretary for North Korea Alex Wong. He was questioned by the Legislative Yuan about the Hong Kong national security law that same month.

Tsai Ming-yen's appointment as Taiwan's representative to the European Union and Belgium was announced in June 2020. As representative to the EU, Tsai met with European Parliament vice-president Nicola Beer in December 2020, and marked the tenth anniversary of the Schengen visa waiver's application to Taiwan in 2021. In August 2022, Tsai was named deputy foreign minister. Tsai remained at his European post through October 2022, and took office as deputy minister by November. As deputy foreign minister, Tsai visited Poland in December 2022 to sign three memorandums of understanding regarding trade and the semiconductor industry. Later that month, he hosted a banquet for Polish politician Anna Fotyga in Taiwan and met with Tony Fernandes, the deputy assistant secretary of the Department of State's Bureau of Economic and Business Affairs, and the first senior US official to visit Taiwan since US President Joe Biden assumed office. In mid-January 2023, Tsai hosted a banquet for the first delegation of Spanish Congress of Deputies members to visit Taiwan since November 2019.

On 26 January 2023, Tsai was appointed director-general of the National Security Bureau.
