= Jason Yuan =

Taiwanese politician and diplomat

- 袁健生
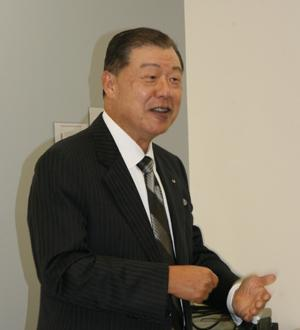

16th Secretary-General of the National Security Council of the Republic of China
- In office 27 September 2012 – 24 March 2014
- Deputy: John Deng
- Preceded by: Hu Wei-jen
- Succeeded by: King Pu-tsung

ROC Representative to the United States of America
- In office 4 August 2008 – 27 September 2012
- Preceded by: Joseph Wu
- Succeeded by: King Pu-tsung

ROC Ambassador to Panama
- In office 1 June 1996 – 1 October 1998
- Preceded by: Su Ping-chao
- Succeeded by: Lan Chih-ming

ROC Representative to Canada
- In office 1994–1996

Personal details
- Born: 1 February 1942 (age 84) Guizhou, China
- Party: Kuomintang
- Spouse: Margaret Yuan
- Children: Billy Yuan, Alice Yuan
- Education: Republic of China Naval Academy; Southeastern University

Jason Yuan (Chinese: 袁健生; pinyin: Yuán Jiànshēng; born 1 February 1942) is a Taiwanese politician and diplomat. He was the Secretary-General of the National Security Council in 2012–2014.

== ROC Representative to the United States ==
Yuan was the chief representative of the Republic of China to the United States as the head of the Taipei Economic and Cultural Representative Office in Washington, DC. He was appointed to that position in July 2008 by President Ma Ying-jeou to succeed Joseph Wu, who had been appointed by the previous administration.

== See also ==
- Foreign relations of the Republic of China
- Republic of China – United States relations

Government offices
Preceded by Joseph Wu	Head of TECRO in the USA; 2008-2012	Succeeded by King Pu-tsung
