= Qiu Changwei =

Republic of China politician (1898–1956)

- 邱昌渭
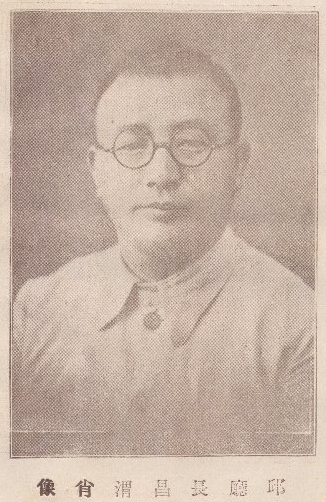
- Portrait of Qiu published in 1937

Secretary-General to the President
- In office 26 June 1949 – 20 March 1950
- Preceded by: Weng Wenhao
- Succeeded by: Wang Shijie

Member of the Legislative Yuan
- In office 20 May 1948 – June 1949
- Preceded by: multi-member district
- Succeeded by: multi-member district
- Constituency: Hunan 3

Personal details
- Born: 16 October 1898 Qing China
- Died: 24 July 1956 (aged 57) Taiwan
- Party: Kuomintang
- Education: Pomona College; Columbia University

Qiu Changwei (Chinese: 邱昌渭; 16 October 1898 – 24 July 1956) was a Chinese-born politician. He began his political career in the Guangxi Provincial Government, then served on the National Political Assembly and Legislative Yuan. His tenure as Secretary-General to the President of the Republic of China between 1949 and 1950 saw the government relocate from mainland China to Taiwan. In Taiwan, Qiu was a member of the Civil Service Higher Examination Committee and Continental Liberation Planning and Research Committee.

== Early life, education, and academic career ==
Qiu was born on 18 October 1898, and could trace his ancestry to Zhijiang County in Hunan.

Qiu as a graduate student, Columbia University Chinese Students Association

Qiu earned his Bachelor of Arts degree at Pomona College in 1923, and completed his Master of Arts in political science, followed by a doctorate in philosophy, both at Columbia University, in 1924 and 1928, respectively. Upon his return to China, Qiu became a professor at Northeastern University. He also taught at Tsinghua University, Peking University and Sun Yat-sen University. During his teaching career, he served as an adviser and secretariat of the Fourth Army Group of the National Revolutionary Army, as well as secretary-general of the Guangxi Provincial Government.

== Political career in China ==
On 18 January 1932, Qiu was appointed Chief Secretary of Intelligence for the Nationalist government's Ministry of Foreign Affairs. He resigned from the foreign ministry on 28 March of the same year. On 2 October 1936, Qiu returned to the Guangxi Provincial Government as head of the provincial education ministry. He was reassigned to lead the provincial civil affairs ministry on 24 June 1939. From 11 August 1939, Qiu was a member of the Guangxi Examination Committee. The following year, Qiu was a member of the Guangxi delegation to the National Assembly convened to consider Control Yuan appointments. Qiu was dismissed from his position as leader of the provincial civil affairs ministry on 1 February 1943, and formally resigned as a member of the Guangxi Provincial Government on 4 October 1943. He was elected to the fourth term of the National Political Assembly, which started on 23 April 1945, representing Hunan.

On 3 October 1946, the Executive Yuan appointed Qiu to a district management committee. Later that month, he became the deputy secretary-general of that body. Qiu was elevated to lead the second inspectorate convened by the district management committee on 30 January 1947, and resigned from the committee entirely on 21 February 1947. He was elected to the First Legislative Yuan in the 1948 Chinese legislative election, representing Hunan's third district, a multi-member constituency. During his tenure on the Legislative Yuan, Qiu was a member of the Foreign Affairs, National Defense, and Finance and Financial Affairs Committees. From 26 June 1949, Qiu was Secretary-General to the President of the Republic of China. In July 1949, Qiu was to be succeeded on the Legislative Yuan by supplemental member Jiang Gu, who did not report to assume the office. Qiu submitted his resignation as presidential secretary-general on 20 March 1950.

== Later political career in Taiwan ==
Qiu returned to public service on 19 August 1954, as an appointed member of the Civil Service Higher Examination Committee. His second term on the committee began on 25 August 1955. On 9 October 1954, Qiu was appointed secretary-general of the Continental Liberation Planning and Research Committee.

Qiu died in Taiwan on 24 July 1956. A collection of Qiu's papers, complied during his tenure as presidential secretary-general, was donated to Columbia University Libraries in 2005. One of his daughters, Chiu Kai-yun, became a United States citizen in 1965 and was the head librarian of the Library Company of the Baltimore Bar from 1976 to 2003, the second-longest tenured librarian since the library was founded in 1840.
