= Opinion polling on the Tsai Ing-wen presidency =

Surveying on 2016–2024 ROC administration

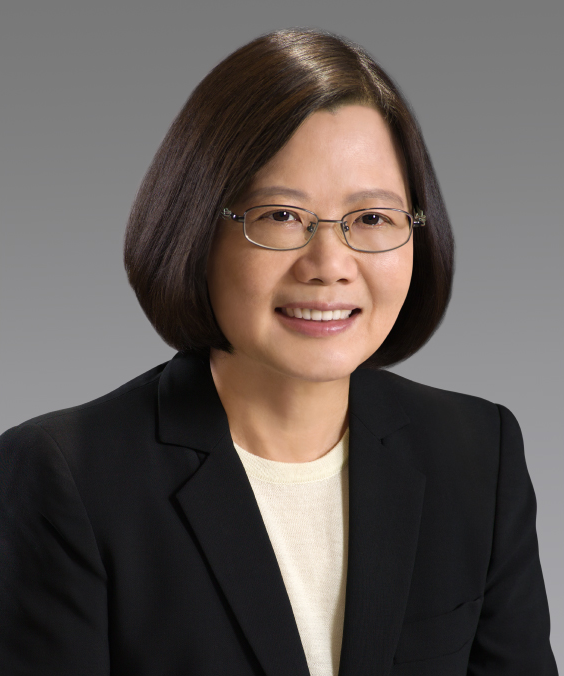
Tsai Ing-wen

This article is lists of opinion pollings on her presidency which gather and analyze public opinion on her administration's performance and policies.

The Presidency of Tsai Ing-wen began with a high approval rating due to expectations, but this quickly declined due to delays and forced reforms. However, it rose sharply just before the 2020 presidential election in response to the situation in Hong Kong, and reached a peak due to the successful measures taken to prevent the COVID-19 pandemic after she was re-elected. After that, approval ratings remained generally high until the end of her term, and in 2024, she succeeded in getting her party's successor elected in 2024 presidential election, and completed her term with an approval rating of over 50%, becoming the first person in Taiwan's history to achieve two remarkable feats.

Her approval ratings varied greatly between the first and second halves of her eight-year term, but overall, her approval rating exceeded her disapproval rating for more than half of that period, and her average approval rating throughout her term was consistently higher than her disapproval rating.

In a poll using a different question, conducted at the end of her eight-year term, more than 60% of respondents gave her administration a passing grade on a 100-point scale. When evaluating individual policy area, all major policies received support from over 40% of respondents, with some approaching nearly 90%.

LOESS regression of the Opinion Polling for the Tsai Ing-wen Presidency.

== Nationwide job approval ratings ==
=== 2016 ===
Fieldwork date	Sample size	Polling firm				Lead
Fieldwork date	Sample size	Polling firm	Approve	Disapprove	Und. / no answer	Lead
10–12 May	1,033	TVBS	40	14	46	6
23–24 May	1,089	TPOF	69.9	8.8	21.3	61.1
26–27 May	1,007	TPOC	50.2	16.3	33.5	33.9
30–31 May	1,157	Taiwan Thinktank	52.4	12.5	35.1	39.9
12–13 Jun	1,005	TPOC	50.6	22.8	26.6	27.8
15–16 Jun	929	TVBS	47	18	35	29
16–17 Jun	1,073	Taiwan Thinktank	49.3	22.6	29.1	26.7
19–21 Jun	1,077	TPOF	67.0	15.6	17.4	51.4
23–28 Jun	1,741	Teds	55.7	25.4	18.9	30.3
27–28 Jun	1,002	TPOC	54.6	23.5	21.9	31.1
4–6 Jul	962	TVBS	44	24	32	20
11–12 Jul	1,008	TPOC	53.2	23.4	23.4	29.8
18–19 Jul	1,084	TPOF	55.9	21.1	23.0	34.8
26–27 Jul	1,006	TPOC	50.2	32.3	17.5	17.9
26–27 Jul	1,078	Taiwan Thinktank	49.1	36.0	14.9	13.1
11–12 Aug	1,003	TPOC	45.5	39.8	14.7	5.7
18–19 Aug	1,071	Nextgen Foundation	53.0	41.2	5.8	11.8
19–21 Aug	1,093	Apple Daily	43.59	50.49	5.92	6.9
21–22 Aug	1,069	Taiwan Thinktank	48.5	38.4	13.1	10.1
22–23 Aug	807	China Times	41.4	40.4	18.2	1.0
22–24 Aug	1,011	TVBS	39	33	27	6
22–24 Aug	1,076	TPOF	52.3	33.2	14.5	19.1
24–26 Aug	1,013	UDN	42.0	36.0	23.0	6.0
28–29 Aug	1,004	TPOC	42.8	45.0	12.2	2.2
25 Aug–1 Sep	1,077	KMT	48.4	38.7	12.9	9.7
11–12 Sep	1,017	TPOC	40.8	41.8	17.4	1.0
22–30 Sep	1,282	Teds	37.7	42.9	19.4	5.2
19–20 Sep	1,081	TPOF	44.7	33.7	11.6	11.0
26–29 Sep	1,009	TPOC	38.4	48.3	13.3	9.9
11–12 Oct	1,005	TPOC	37.6	46.4	16.0	8.8
17–18 Oct	1,083	TPOF	44.0	41.2	14.8	2.8
25–26 Oct	1,007	TPOC	34.9	48.4	16.7	13.5
4–6 Nov	1,069	Taiwan Thinktank	40.6	42.8	16.6	2.2
18–20 Nov	1,071	TVBS	26	46	28	20
21–22 Nov	1,098	TPOF	41.4	42.6	16.0	1.2
20–21 Dec	1,097	TPOF	38.0	43.7	18.3	5.7
22–28 Dec	1,300	Teds	34.1	50.7	15.2	16.6

=== 2017 ===
Fieldwork date	Sample size	Polling firm				Lead
Fieldwork date	Sample size	Polling firm	Approve	Disapprove	Und. no ans.	Lead
17–18 Jan	1,078	TPOF	54.4	33.8	11.8	20.6
13–14 Feb	1,088	TPOF	41.3	41.4	17.3	0.1
15–16 Feb	1,072	Formosa	43.0	41.0	16.0	2.0
13–14 Mar	1,185	TPOF	42.5	37.6	19.9	4.9
23–24 Mar	1,076	Formosa	29.5	58.0	12.5	28.5
23–28 Mar	1,218	Teds	33.3	52.3	14.4	19.0
17–18 Apr	1,082	TPOF	46.0	38.6	15.4	7.4
26–28 Apr	1,075	Formosa	31.5	57.1	11.4	25.6
3–5 May	1,016	China Times	28.0	54.3	17.7	26.3
4–6 May	1,077	NPF	33.4	58.7	7.9	25.3
5–7 May	1,179	Apple Daily	40.71	55.30	3.99	14.59
8–9 May	1,074	TPOC	33.2	53.3	13.5	20.1
9–10 May	1,074	CSPA	40.8	54.8	4.4	14.0
5–12 May	992	TVBS	28	56	16	28
12–15 May	1,084	UDN	30	50	20	20
13–15 May	1,271	Nextgen Foundation	41.3	52.9	5.8	11.6
15–16 May	1,075	TPOF	38.1	56.1	5.8	18.0
15–17 May	833	TDW	18.4	76.4	5.2	58
24–25 May	1,073	Formosa	25.5	66.5	8.0	41.0
9–14 Jun	1,230	Teds	26.5	59.9	13.6	33.4
12–20 Jun	1,069	TVBS	21	63	16	42
19–20 Jun	1,080	TPOF	33.1	49.6	17.3	16.5
25–27 Jun	1,071	Formosa	25.0	66.0	9.0	41.0
4–10 Jul	896	TVBS	29	53	18	24
23–24 Jul	1,074	Formosa	28.9	57.3	13.8	28.4
7–8 Aug	1,074	TPOF	29.8	50.0	20.2	20.2
16–22 Aug	800	TVBS	24	58	18	34
24–25 Aug	1,075	Formosa	27.2	60.2	12.6	33.0
11–12 Sep	1,074	TPOF	46.4	36.4	17.2	10.0
13–18 Sep	866	TVBS	31	46	23	15
21–26 Sep	1,231	Teds	32.7	51.8	15.5	19.1
26–28 Sep	1,071	Formosa	35.4	51.9	12.7	16.5
16–17 Oct	1,068	TPOF	43.6	37.3	19.1	6.3
25–26 Oct	1,070	Formosa	36.3	54.3	9.4	18.0
13–15 Nov	1,074	TPOF	38.6	39.8	21.6	1.2
17–18 Nov	808	TVBS	28	49	23	21
23–24 Nov	1,072	Formosa	28.1	57.3	14.6	29.2
14–19 Dec	1,268	Teds	27.6	55.5	16.9	27.9
20–22 Dec	1,083	Formosa	27.1	60.2	12.7	33.1
25–26 Dec	1,085	TPOF	35.9	46.6	17.5	10.7

=== 2018 ===
Fieldwork date	Sample size	Polling firm				Lead
Fieldwork date	Sample size	Polling firm	Approve	Disapprove	Und. no ans.	Lead
21–23 Jan	1,074	TPOF	31.7	46.7	21.6	15.0
24–27 Feb	1,010	TVBS	30	51	19	21
24–28 Jan	1,075	Formosa	25.3	64.4	10.3	39.1
25–26 Feb	1,071	Formosa	31.9	59.0	9.1	27.1
11–13 Mar	1,072	TPOF	33.5	47.1	19.4	13.6
21–26 Mar	1,241	Teds	26.4	57.8	15.8	31.4
26–27 Mar	1,074	Formosa	27.7	60.6	11.7	32.9
15–17 Apr	1,072	TPOF	32.0	49.0	19.0	17.0
25–27 Apr	1,071	Formosa	29.1	61.6	9.3	32.5
8–11 May	1,389	Apple Daily	34.13	62.48	3.39	28.35
8–11 May	1,072	NPF	20.3	69.9	9.8	49.6
4–15 May	1,073	TVBS	26	60	14	34
14–15 May	1,071	TPOF	39.2	47.6	13.2	8.4
14–15 May	1,020	DPP	48.4	41.5	10.1	6.9
16–17 May	1,114	Nextgen Foundation	44.4	51.5	4.1	7.1
23–25 May	1,072	Formosa	23.5	62.6	13.9	39.1
7–12 Jun	1,214	Teds	23.0	64.6	12.4	41.6
11–12 Jun	1,073	TPOF	32.7	52.0	15.3	19.3
24–26 Jun	1,073	Formosa	25.8	62.3	11.9	36.5
9–11 Jul	1,070	TPOF	33.4	49.0	17.6	15.6
24–26 Jul	1,070	Formosa	26.1	61.7	12.2	35.6
13–14 Aug	1,074	TPOF	33.3	49.9	16.8	16.6
22–24 Aug	1,069	Formosa	26.1	62.9	11.0	36.8
9–12 Sep	1,075	TPOF	31.2	54.5	14.3	23.3
19–21 Sep	1,073	Formosa	27.0	63.3	9.7	36.3
25–30 Sep	1,200	Teds	23.6	61.9	14.5	38.3
24–26 Oct	1,069	Formosa	25.5	67.3	7.2	41.8
7–8 Nov	1,084	TPOF	28.5	54.2	17.3	25.7
25–27 Nov	1,069	Formosa	20.9	67.9	11.2	47.0
26–29 Nov	1,016	TVBS	15	64	21	49
17–18 Dec	1,082	TPOF	24.3	60.3	15.4	36.0
19–21 Dec	1,074	Formosa	21.5	67.3	11.2	45.8
18–23 Dec	1,219	Teds	21.6	64.9	13.5	43.3

=== 2019 ===
Fieldwork date	Sample size	Polling firm				Lead
Fieldwork date	Sample size	Polling firm	Approve	Disapprove	Und. no ans.	Lead
7–11 Jan	829	TVBS	23	53	24	30
14–15 Jan	1,074	TPOF	34.5	47.5	18.0	13.0
22–24 Jan	1,075	Formosa	27.3	63.6	9.1	36.3
21–22 Feb	1,089	TPOF	33.4	52.2	14.4	18.8
20–22 Feb	1,076	Formosa	26.3	64.5	9.2	38.2
18–19 Mar	1,073	TPOF	32.3	54.1	13.6	21.8
24–26 Mar	1,072	Formosa	30.4	61.7	7.9	31.3
26–31 Mar	1,231	Teds	30.4	55.4	14.2	25.0
15–16 Apr	1,072	TPOF	34.6	53.1	12.3	18.5
23–25 Apr	1,068	Formosa	31.1	56.3	12.6	25.2
6–8 May	1,188	TPOC	40.2	51.4	8.4	11.2
13–14 May	1,085	TPOF	43.1	46.8	10.1	3.7
9–16 May	912	TVBS	36	54	10	18
16–17 May	1,106	CSPA	41	53	6	12
17–18 May	1,106	Brain Trust	34.5	53.9	11.6	19.4
26–27 May	1,086	Formosa	32.6	57.5	9.9	24.9
11–16 Jun	1,365	Teds	44.6	44.5	10.9	0.1
17–18 Jun	1,099	Green Party	49.3	45.6	5.1	3.7
17–18 Jun	1,092	TPOF	47.7	43.6	8.7	4.1
23–25 Jun	1,071	Formosa	38.0	53.0	9.0	15.0
1–2 Jul	1,433	Green Party	51.2	45.0	3.8	6.2
15–16 Jul	1,089	TPOF	42.8	47.9	9.2	5.1
15–16 Jul	1,077	CSPA	41.5	54.5	4.0	13.0
24–25 Jul	1,078	Formosa	38.7	53.2	8.1	14.5
1–3 Aug	1,068	TNCF	43.7	46.6	9.7	2.9
19–20 Aug	1,085	TPOF	45.1	45.2	9.8	0.1
26–27 Aug	1,089	Formosa	44.7	49.8	5.5	5.1
28–30 Aug	1,294	TVBS	40	50	10	10
9–11 Sep	1,294	TVBS	37	51	12	14
18–19 Sep	1,080	TPOF	48.0	43.9	8.1	4.1
25–26 Sep	1,071	Formosa	47.5	49.1	3.4	1.6
24–28 Sep	1,240	Teds	44.2	42.9	12.9	1.3
21–22 Oct	1,089	TPOF	48.3	42.8	8.9	5.5
24–25 Oct	1,069	Formosa	44.9	48.8	6.3	3.9
18–19 Nov	1,078	TPOF	55.5	36.1	8.4	19.4
23–24 Nov	1,069	CSPA	52.4	40.5	7.1	11.9
25–26 Nov	1,071	Formosa	52.9	41.0	6.1	11.9
27–28 Nov	1,079	TNCF	55.0	32.9	12.1	22.1
5–7 Dec	1,068	Brain Trust	51.8	34.9	13.3	16.9
12–14 Dec	1,039	TVBS	41	46	13	5
12–14 Dec	1,110	UDN	48	38	14	10
11–16 Dec	1,260	Teds	53.5	31.2	15.3	22.3
23–24 Dec	1,075	TPOF	49.3	38.3	12.4	11.0
25–26 Dec	1,072	Formosa	51.4	43.9	4.7	7.5

=== 2020 ===
Fieldwork date	Sample size	Polling firm				Lead
Fieldwork date	Sample size	Polling firm	Approve	Disapprove	Und. no ans.	Lead
12–13 Jan	1,080	TNCF	65.7	27.6	6.7	38.1
14–15 Jan	1,078	TPOF	56.7	27.1	16.2	29.6
10–12 Feb	1,070	Baodao News	71.9	18.2	9.9	53.7
10–12 Feb	1,353	TVBS	54	29	17	25
17–18 Feb	1,079	TPOF	68.5	16.5	15.0	52
20–21 Feb	1,072	Formosa	63.5	32.0	4.5	31.5
20–25 Mar	1,056	TVBS	60	22	18	38
23–24 Mar	1,085	NPP	75.7	12.9	11.4	62.8
25–26 Mar	1,070	Formosa	69.4	24.9	5.7	44.5
26–31 Mar	1,299	Teds	74.1	15.4	10.5	58.7
17–18 Apr	813	NPP	76.9	10.9	12.2	66.0
23–24 Apr	1,070	Formosa	70.3	24.1	5.6	46.2
25–28 Apr	1,075	Brain Trust	74.5	13.8	11.7	60.7
5–8 May	1,071	CAPOR	65	22	13	43
6–8 May	1,072	Baodao News	74.6	19.4	6.0	55.2
11–12 May	1,121	TNCF	72.6	17.3	10.1	55.3
13–19 May	919	TVBS	61	25	14	36
20–21 May	1,085	TPOF	71.2	15.6	13.2	55.6
21–22 May	1,072	Formosa	68.3	27.7	4.0	40.6
25–26 May	811	NPP	68.0	21.3	10.7	46.7
2–7 Jun	1,217	Teds	65.5	23.7	10.8	41.8
12–14 Jun	1,073	Baodao News	64.4	29.0	6.6	35.4
15–16 Jun	1,074	TPOF	60.7	31.9	7.4	28.8
17–19 Jun	1,068	NPP	61.4	25.1	13.5	36.3
22–23 Jun	1,071	Formosa	63.1	34.6	2.3	28.5
18–21 Jul	1,095	NPP	60.8	30.1	9.1	30.7
20–22 Jul	1,076	TPOF	58.5	34.4	7.1	24.1
23–24 Jul	1,072	Formosa	62.5	32.9	4.6	29.6
17–18 Aug	1,090	TPOF	65.8	22.1	12.1	43.7
18–25 Aug	1,107	TVBS	52	27	21	25
25–26 Aug	1,070	Formosa	65.4	31.5	3.1	33.9
31 Aug–2 Sep	936	TVBS	48	36	16	12
21–22 Sep	1,076	TPOF	55.1	32.3	12.6	22.8
23–24 Sep	1,070	Formosa	58.8	36.6	4.6	22.2
22–27 Sep	1,214	Teds	58.6	27.9	13.5	30.7
19–20 Oct	1,080	TPOF	56.6	29.2	14.2	27.4
22–23 Oct	1,070	Formosa	60.7	35.8	3.5	24.9
16–17 Nov	1,070	TPOF	55.2	31.1	13.7	24.1
24–25 Nov	1,070	Formosa	56.7	40.6	2.7	16.1
24–26 Nov	944	TVBS	43	41	16	2
3–7 Dec	1,032	GVM	54.6	36.1	9.3	18.5
18–19 Dec	1,020	DPP	60.9	36.3	2.8	24.6
21–22 Dec	1,071	TPOF	52.8	36.3	10.9	16.5
22–23 Dec	1,070	Formosa	54.3	43.5	2.2	10.8
22–27 Dec	1,254	Teds	56.1	32.7	11.2	23.4

=== 2021 ===
Fieldwork date	Sample size	Polling firm				Lead
Fieldwork date	Sample size	Polling firm	Approve	Disapprove	Und. no ans.	Lead
18–19 Jan	1,081	TPOF	51.3	37.4	11.3	13.9
20–21 Jan	1,072	Formosa	57.8	39.5	2.7	18.3
24–25 Feb	1,074	Formosa	59.8	36.6	3.6	23.2
15–16 Mar	1,079	TPOF	58.4	27.1	14.5	31.3
24–25 Mar	1,076	Formosa	59.3	38.1	2.6	21.2
25–30 Mar	1,246	Teds	61.3	27.5	11.2	33.8
19–21 Apr	1,021	TPOF	54.4	29.9	15.7	24.5
21–22 Apr	1,072	Formosa	56.0	41.3	2.7	14.7
29 Apr–3 May	1,102	GVM	55.3	31.1	13.6	24.2
17–20 May	1,082	TPOF	45.7	41.3	13.0	4.4
31 May–1 Jun	1,074	Formosa	48.9	47.3	3.8	1.6
19–21 Jul	1,072	TPOF	45.4	45.2	9.4	0.2
21–22 Jul	1,075	Formosa	49.6	48.4	3.7	1.2
16–18 Aug	1,078	TPOF	45.3	41.5	13.2	3.8
25–26 Aug	1,077	Formosa	55.0	43.3	1.7	11.7
9–18 Sep	1,217	Teds	50.9	38.1	11.0	12.8
22–23 Sep	1,080	TPOF	48.6	42.5	8.9	6.1
23–27 Sep	1,069	NPP	56.0	37.4	6.6	18.6
18–20 Oct	1,075	TPOF	54.4	34.5	11.1	19.9
25–26 Oct	1,074	Formosa	53.7	43.3	3.0	10.4
8–11 Nov	1,004	TVBS	41	39	20	2
22–23 Nov	1,078	TPOF	46.8	41.2	12.0	5.6
24–25 Nov	1,076	Formosa	55.5	41.8	2.7	13.7
1–6 Dec	1,020	TVBS	41	37	22	4
9–14 Dec	1,230	Teds	51.5	35.6	12.9	15.9
10–15 Dec	1,142	TVBS	41	39	20	2
20–21 Dec	1,069	TPOF	46.4	41.3	12.3	5.1
22–23 Dec	1,072	Formosa	54.6	42.0	3.4	12.6

=== 2022 ===
Fieldwork date	Sample size	Polling firm				Lead
Fieldwork date	Sample size	Polling firm	Approve	Disapprove	Und. no ans.	Lead
17–18 Jan	1,083	TPOF	49.7	41.3	9.0	8.4
19–20 Jan	1,072	Formosa	54.4	41.9	3.7	12.5
8–11 Feb	929	TVBS	46	34	20	12
14–15 Feb	1,079	TPOF	50.3	37.3	12.4	13.0
16–17 Feb	1,075	Formosa	57.0	40.6	2.4	16.4
14–15 Mar	1,077	TPOF	51.8	33.4	14.8	18.4
17–22 Mar	808	TVBS	43	36	21	7
23–24 Mar	1,082	Formosa	58.8	37.8	3.4	21.0
24–30 Mar	1,203	Teds	57.0	30.8	12.2	26.2
17–19 Apr	1,071	TPOF	49.9	35.5	14.6	14.4
20–21 Apr	1,071	Formosa	56.0	39.2	4.8	16.8
11–13 May	1,134	TPN	47.4	37.6	15.0	9.8
16–17 May	1,077	TPOF	49.5	39.2	11.3	10.3
25–26 May	1,070	Formosa	49.9	44.8	5.3	5.1
12–14 Jun	1,079	TPOF	47.3	41.9	10.8	5.4
15–20 Jun	1,245	Teds	49.3	36.2	14.5	13.1
15–17 Jun	1,074	TPN	45.2	39.5	15.3	5.7
21–23 Jun	1,082	Formosa	54.5	42.2	3.3	12.3
11–13 Jul	1,075	TPOF	53.0	35.1	11.9	17.9
18–21 Jul	1,088	TPN	47.1	36.2	16.7	10.9
20–21 Jul	1,074	Formosa	56.2	41.0	2.8	15.2
8–9 Aug	1,035	TPOF	45.7	40.8	13.5	4.9
12–15 Aug	1,082	TPN	46.4	38.1	15.5	8.3
24–25 Aug	1,072	Formosa	50.4	46.5	3.1	3.9
2–8 Sep	1,205	Teds	48.9	39.4	11.7	9.5
12–13 Sep	1,005	TPOF	48.7	43.4	7.9	5.3
21–22 Sep	1,071	Formosa	52.0	46.1	1.9	5.9
24–26 Sep	1,078	TPN	47.2	39.6	13.2	7.6
8–11 Oct	1,087	TPN	44.0	43.1	12.9	0.9
10–11 Oct	1,010	TPOF	51.2	37.7	11.1	13.5
24–25 Oct	1,072	Formosa	50.4	46.6	3.0	3.8
27–28 Nov	1,068	TPN	45.1	42.2	12.7	2.9
29–30 Nov	1,073	Formosa	46.5	49.1	4.4	2.6
2–7 Dec	1,239	Teds	40.2	48.0	11.8	7.8
12–13 Dec	1,070	TPOF	37.5	46.4	16.1	8.9
21–22 Dec	1,072	Formosa	38.9	58.2	2.9	19.3

=== 2023 ===
Fieldwork date	Sample size	Polling firm				Lead
Fieldwork date	Sample size	Polling firm	Approve	Disapprove	Und. no ans.	Lead
9–13 Jan	1,085	TPOF	35.8	56.9	7.3	21.1
13–14 Feb	1,072	TPOF	39.7	44.3	16.0	4.6
17–18 Feb	1,071	Formosa	45.1	51.1	3.8	6.0
7–12 Mar	1,205	Teds	47.3	40.4	12.3	6.9
13–14 Mar	1,073	TPOF	41.6	44.6	13.8	3.0
23–24 Mar	1,071	Formosa	47.6	49.2	3.2	1.6
9–11 Apr	1,068	TPOF	44.0	42.8	13.3	1.2
19–20 Apr	1,071	Formosa	49.6	46.5	3.9	3.1
8–9 May	1,076	TPOF	45.3	36.8	17.9	8.5
10–11 May	1,067	APEIA	50.7	43.3	5.9	7.4
24–25 May	1,072	Formosa	50.0	46.9	3.1	3.1
2–7 Jun	1,259	Teds	46.5	40.4	13.1	6.1
12–13 Jun	1,080	TPOF	42.3	48.7	9.0	6.4
28–29 Jun	1,070	Formosa	49.3	48.1	2.6	1.2
17–18 Jul	1,088	TPOF	41.7	48.7	9.6	7.0
24–25 Jul	1,071	Formosa	48.2	47.3	4.5	0.9
14–15 Aug	1,081	TPOF	48.8	42.3	8.9	6.5
23–24 Aug	1,070	Formosa	50.9	45.5	3.6	5.4
18–20 Sep	1,077	TPOF	38.4	48.2	13.4	9.8
20–21 Sep	1,072	Formosa	49.6	45.8	4.6	3.8
21–26 Sep	1,224	Teds	47.3	40.5	12.2	6.8
15–17 Oct	1,080	TPOF	36.5	53.0	10.5	16.5
24–25 Oct	1,070	Formosa	43.9	50.0	6.1	6.1
19–21 Nov	1,076	TPOF	38.6	53.6	7.8	15.0
27–28 Nov	1,076	Formosa	47.5	48.5	4.0	1.0
7–12 Dec	1,232	Teds	43.2	45.5	11.3	2.3
20–21 Dec	1,070	Formosa	45.9	49.9	4.2	4.0
22–24 Dec	1,071	TPOF	41.5	48.2	10.3	6.7

=== 2024 ===
Fieldwork date	Sample size	Polling firm				Lead
Fieldwork date	Sample size	Polling firm	Approve	Disapprove	Und. no ans.	Lead
24–25 Jan	1,070	Formosa	51.6	44.9	3.5	6.7
21–22 Feb	1,070	Formosa	51.1	43.8	5.1	7.3
17–18 Mar	1,115	Mirror News	50.5	39.2	10.3	11.3
25–27 Mar	1,071	Formosa	52.2	43.3	4.5	8.9
26–31 Mar	1,202	Teds	54.8	34.7	10.5	20.1
14–15 Apr	1,078	Mirror News	50.4	39.5	10.1	10.9
15–17 Apr	1,084	TPOF	50.1	45.1	4.8	5.0
22–24 Apr	1,073	Formosa	49.6	45.6	4.8	4.0
25 Apr–6 May	1,020	TVBS	42	46	12	4
8–9 May	1,013	APEIA	58.0	35.8	6.2	22.2
12–13 May	1,079	Mirror News	54.1	38.5	7.4	15.6

== Public evaluation ==
A public opinion poll rating the government on a scale of 100.

In an opinion poll before the end of her term, over 60% people approved of her administration, with the average score above 60.

Fieldwork date	Polling firm	Sample size				Lead	Average rating
Fieldwork date	Polling firm	Sample size	Approve	Disapprove	Und. no ans.	Lead	Average rating
16–17 May, 2022	TPOF	1,077	66.4	29.3	4.4	37.1	61.55/100
8–9 May, 2023	TPOF	1,076	61.7	34.6	3.8	27.1	60.29/100
15–17 Apr, 2024	TPOF	1,084	62.4	35.2	2.4	27.2	60.50/100
22–24 Apr, 2024	Formosa	1,073	64.6	32.9	2.5	31.7	61.7/100

== Itemized evaluation ==
A public opinion poll that evaluates the policies implemented by the government on an item-by-item basis.

In the individual evaluations, economic and cross-strait policy received mixed reviews, but national defence and foreign policy received high marks during all periods.

Fieldwork date	Polling firm	Sample size	Evaluation items				Lead
Fieldwork date	Polling firm	Sample size	Evaluation items	Approve	Disapprove	Und. no ans.	Lead
17–18 Feb, 2020	TPOF	1,079	Cross-Strait relations	71.5	17.7	10.8	53.8
26–31 Mar, 2020	Teds	1,299	National defence	63.1	21.7	15.3	41.4
26–31 Mar, 2020	Teds	1,299	Foreign policy	58.6	31.8	9.6	26.8
26–31 Mar, 2020	Teds	1,299	Cross-Strait relations	60.0	29.9	10.1	30.1
26–31 Mar, 2020	Teds	1,299	Economic policy	51.8	41.1	7.1	10.7
5–8 May, 2020	CAPOR	1,071	Foreign policy	63	27	11	36
5–8 May, 2020	CAPOR	1,071	Cross-Strait relations	57	32	11	25
5–8 May, 2020	CAPOR	1,071	Economic policy	56	34	10	22
21–22 Dec, 2020	TPOF	1,071	National defence	61.5	31.2	7.3	30.3
21–22 Dec, 2020	TPOF	1,071	Foreign policy	60.0	35.1	4.9	24.9
21–22 Dec, 2020	TPOF	1,071	Economic policy	58.0	37.6	4.4	20.4
25–30 Mar, 2021	Teds	1,246	National defence	51.1	36.9	12.1	14.2
25–30 Mar, 2021	Teds	1,246	Foreign policy	55.0	35.4	9.6	19.6
25–30 Mar, 2021	Teds	1,246	Cross-Strait relations	48.4	40.2	11.4	8.2
25–30 Mar, 2021	Teds	1,246	Economic policy	50.5	43.1	6.5	7.4
24–30 Mar, 2022	Teds	1,203	National defence	53.5	35.0	11.6	18.5
24–30 Mar, 2022	Teds	1,203	Foreign policy	55.0	35.0	10.1	20.0
24–30 Mar, 2022	Teds	1,203	Cross-Strait relations	48.3	40.2	11.4	8.1
24–30 Mar, 2022	Teds	1,203	Economic policy	48.9	44.2	6.9	4.7
16–17 May, 2022	TPOF	1,077	National defence	51.0	35.0	13.9	16.0
16–17 May, 2022	TPOF	1,077	Foreign policy	56.7	32.9	9.4	23.8
16–17 May, 2022	TPOF	1,077	Cross-Strait relations	49.5	39.2	11.2	10.3
16–17 May, 2022	TPOF	1,077	Economic policy	47.4	44.8	7.9	2.6
8–9 May, 2023	TPOF	1,076	National defence	55.9	37.6	6.5	18.3
8–9 May, 2023	TPOF	1,076	Foreign policy	61.5	32.9	5.7	28.6
8–9 May, 2023	TPOF	1,076	Cross-Strait relations	54.9	38.5	6.5	16.4
8–9 May, 2023	TPOF	1,076	Economic policy	47.4	46.4	6.2	1.0
26–31 Mar, 2024	Teds	1,202	National defence	52.8	34.2	12.9	18.6
26–31 Mar, 2024	Teds	1,202	Foreign policy	50.2	40.2	9.7	10.0
26–31 Mar, 2024	Teds	1,202	Cross-Strait relations	45.0	43.7	11.4	1.3
26–31 Mar, 2024	Teds	1,202	Economic policy	46.2	48.2	5.5	2.0
15–17 Apr, 2024	TPOF	1,084	National defence	52.0	40.7	7.5	11.3
15–17 Apr, 2024	TPOF	1,084	Foreign policy	48.5	46.3	5.3	2.2
15–17 Apr, 2024	TPOF	1,084	Cross-Strait relations	45.4	48.1	6.4	2.7
15–17 Apr, 2024	TPOF	1,084	Economic policy	46.0	49.9	4.2	3.9
15–17 Apr, 2024	TPOF	1,084	Pension reform	50.0	35.8	14.2	14.2
8–9 May, 2024	APEIA	1,013	Economic policy	55.3	41.3	3.4	14.0
8–9 May, 2024	APEIA	1,013	Sovereignty policy	66.9	28.4	4.7	38.5
8–9 May, 2024	APEIA	1,013	National defence	58.3	33.6	8.2	24.7
8–9 May, 2024	APEIA	1,013	Foreign policy	57.1	38.5	4.4	18.6
8–9 May, 2024	APEIA	1,013	Cross-Strait relations	52.5	42.3	5.1	10.2
8–9 May, 2024	APEIA	1,013	Childcare	78.9	7.6	13.5	71.3
8–9 May, 2024	APEIA	1,013	Long-term care	88.4	5.5	6.1	82.9
8–9 May, 2024	APEIA	1,013	Wage increases	84.1	11.6	4.3	72.5
8–9 May, 2024	APEIA	1,013	Pension reform	63.0	23.0	14.0	40.0

== See also ==
- Tsai Ing-wen
- Presidency of Tsai Ing-wen
- 2016 Taiwanese presidential election
- 2020 Taiwanese presidential election
- 2024 Taiwanese presidential election
- Opinion polling for the 2020 Taiwanese general election
