= Liu Chien-sin =

Taiwanese politician

- 劉建忻
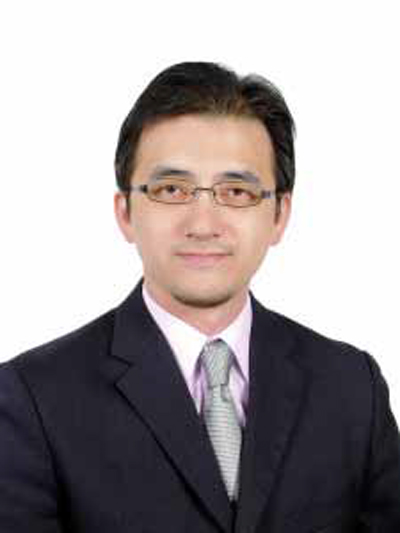
- Official portrait, 2016

21st Secretary-General of the Examination Yuan
- Incumbent
- Assumed office 1 September 2020
- President: Huang Jong-tsun; Chou Hung-hsien
- Preceded by: Lee Jih-shyuan
Additional offices
Acting Secretary-General to the President
In office 2 August 2020 – 3 August 2020
President	Tsai Ing-wen
Preceded by	Su Jia-chyuan
Succeeded by	David Lee
In office 26 February 2018 – 20 April 2018
President	Tsai Ing-wen
Deputy	Yao Jen-to
Preceded by	Joseph Wu
Succeeded by	Chen Chu
In office 20 October 2016 – 17 May 2017
President	Tsai Ing-wen
Deputy	Yao Jen-to
Preceded by	Lin Bih-jaw
Succeeded by	Joseph Wu
Deputy Secretary-General to the President
In office 21 April 2018 – 2 August 2020
President	Tsai Ing-wen
Secretary-General	Chen Chu; Su Jia-chyuan
In office 22 May 2017 – 25 February 2018 Serving with Yao Jen-to
President	Tsai Ing-wen
Secretary-General	Joseph Wu
In office 20 May 2016 – 19 October 2016 Serving with Tseng Hou-jen
President	Tsai Ing-wen
Secretary-General	Lin Bih-jaw

Personal details
- Born: 8 June 1968 (age 58)
- Party: Democratic Progressive Party
- Education: National Taiwan University (BA); Georgetown University (MPP)

Liu Chien-sin

Chinese name
- Traditional Chinese: 劉建忻
Transcriptions
Standard Mandarin
- Hanyu Pinyin: Liú Jiànxīn
Southern Min
- Hokkien POJ: Lâu Kiàn-him

Liu Chien-sin or Jason Liu (Chinese: 劉建忻; pinyin: Liú Jiànxīn; born 8 June 1968) is a Taiwanese politician who currently serve as the secretary-general of the Examination Yuan since 2020.

He was appointed as the Deputy Secretary-General to the President on 21 April 2018, and the acting Secretary-General to the President on three occasions the latest being on 2 August 2020. He served short tenures for each appointment.

== Education ==
Liu graduated from National Taiwan University with a bachelor's degree in business administration and earned a Master of Public Policy (M.P.P.) from Georgetown University.

== Honors ==
- 2024 Order of Brilliant Star with Special Grand Cordon

Government offices
Preceded by Lin Bih-jaw	Secretary-General to the President (Acting); 2016–2017	Succeeded by Joseph Wu
Preceded by Joseph Wu	Secretary-General to the President (Acting); 2018	Succeeded by Chen Chu
Preceded by Su Jia-chyuan	Secretary-General to the President (Acting); 2020	Succeeded by David Lee
Preceded by Lee Jih-shyuan	Secretary-General of the Examination Yuan; 2020–present	Incumbent
