= Xavier Chang =

Taiwanese politician (born 1981)

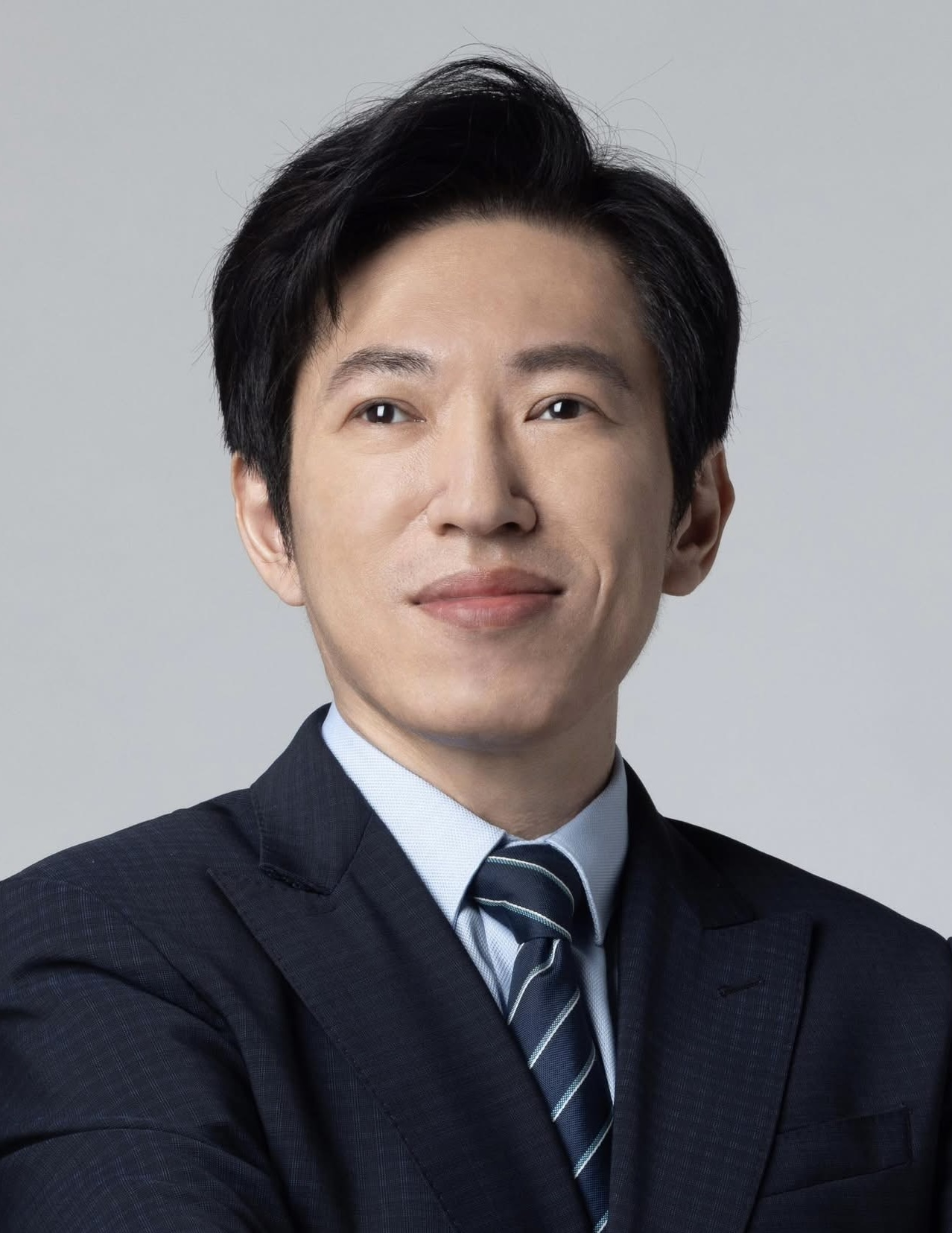
- Official portrait, 2025

37th Secretary-General of the Executive Yuan
- Incumbent
- Assumed office 1 September 2025
- President: Lai Ching-te
- Preceded by: Kung Ming-hsin

Personal details
- Born: 17 July 1981 (age 45) Keelung, Taiwan
- Party: Democratic Progressive
- Education: National Taiwan University (BA, MA)

Chinese name
- Traditional Chinese: 張惇涵
- Simplified Chinese: 张惇涵
Transcriptions
Standard Mandarin
- Hanyu Pinyin: Zhāng Dūnhán
- Bopomofo: ㄓㄤ ㄉㄨㄣ ㄏㄢˊ

Chang Tun-han (Chinese: 張惇涵; pinyin: Zhāng Dūnhán; born 17 July 1981), also known as Xavier Chang, is a Taiwanese politician who has served as Secretary-General of the Executive Yuan since 2025.

== Early life and education ==
Chang was born in Keelung, Taiwan, in 1981. He graduated from National Taiwan University with a Bachelor of Arts in political science in 2005 and a Master of Arts in political science in 2012. As an undergraduate, he was a class representative, worked as the deputy director of the university's student union, and served as the head of a student public relations station.

== Political career ==
In 2004, Chang was recruited by President Chen Shui-bian to join his re-election campaign and became the executive director of Chen's youth headquarters for northern Taiwan. Chang then worked as a secretary in the office of legislator Wu Ping-jui from 2006 to January 2008 and as a secretary for the Taiwan Provincial Government from February 2008 to May 2008.

In 2013, Chang became the spokesman and director for Su Tseng-chang, the chairman of the Democratic Progressive Party. Afterwards, he served as the director of the Department of Information at the Taoyuan City Government from 2014 to 2018, having been recruited to the position by Taoyuan mayor Cheng Wen-tsan. In January 2019, he was appointed the spokesperson for the Office of the President under Tsai Ing-wen, and became the office's director in 2022.

From January 2023 to August 2025, Chang served as the deputy secretary-general for the Office of the President. On August 22, 2025, he was announced to succeed Kung Ming-hsin as the secretary-general of the Executive Yuan. He took office on September 1, 2025. He is the youngest secretary-general in the history of the office.

== Personal life ==
Chang is married to Chen Hsi-chun, a television anchor.
