= Su Jia-chyuan =

Taiwanese politician

Su Jia-chyuan MLY
- 蘇嘉全
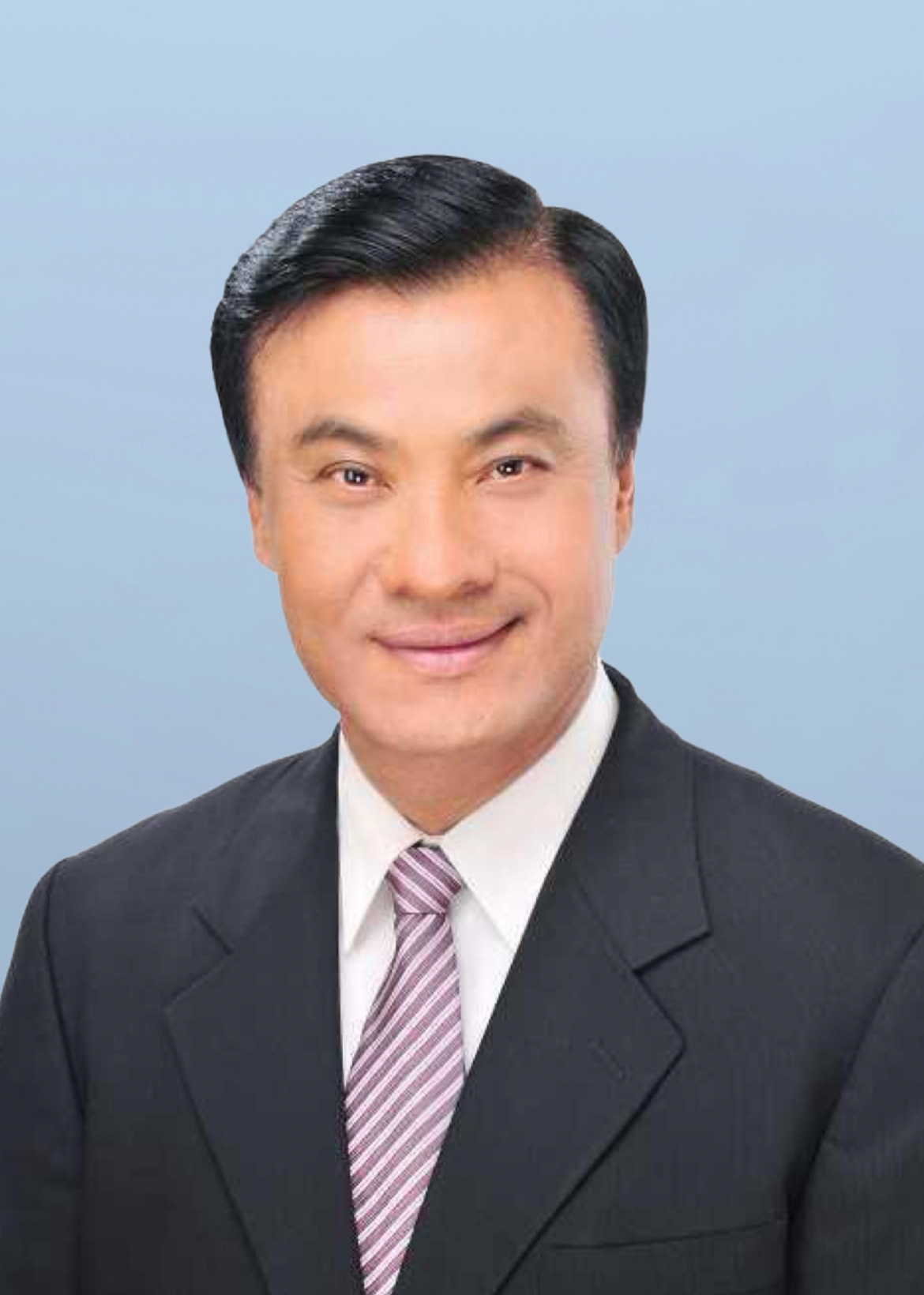
- Official portrait, 2016

11th Chairperson of the Straits Exchange Foundation
- Incumbent
- Assumed office 23 January 2026
- President: Lai Ching-te
- Preceded by: Frank Wu

11th President of the Legislative Yuan
- In office 1 February 2016 – 31 January 2020
- Vice President: Tsai Chi-chang
- Preceded by: Wang Jin-pyng
- Succeeded by: Yu Shyi-kun
Additional offices
2nd Chairman of the Taiwan–Japan Relations Association
In office 27 May 2022 – 5 January 2026
President	Tsai Ing-wen; Lai Ching-te
Preceded by	Chiou I-jen
Succeeded by	Frank Hsieh
36th Secretary-General to the President
In office 20 May 2020 – 2 August 2020
President	Tsai Ing-wen
Preceded by	Chen Chu
Succeeded by	Liu Chien-sin (acting)
16th & 18th Secretary-General of the Democratic Progressive Party
In office 20 December 2010 – 15 June 2012
Chairperson	Tsai Ing-wen
Preceded by	Wu Nai-ren
Succeeded by	Lin Hsi-yao
In office 20 December 2009 – 20 May 2010
Chairperson	Tsai Ing-wen
Preceded by	Wu Nai-ren
Succeeded by	Wu Nai-ren
9th Minister of Agriculture
In office 25 January 2006 – 20 May 2008
Prime Minister	Su Tseng-chang; Chang Chun-hsiung
Deputy	Lin Kuo-hua
Preceded by	Lee Chin-lung
Succeeded by	Chen Wu-hsiung
25th Minister of the Interior
In office 9 April 2004 – 25 January 2006
Prime Minister	Yu Shyi-kun; Frank Hsieh
Deputy	Chang Wen-ying
Preceded by	Yu Cheng-hsien
Succeeded by	Lee I-yang

10th Magistrate of Pingtung
- In office 20 December 1997 – 8 April 2004
- Preceded by: Chang Man-chuen (acting); Wu Tse-yuan
- Succeeded by: Wu Ying-wen (acting); Tsao Chi-hung

Member of the Legislative Yuan
- In office 1 February 2016 – 31 January 2020
- Constituency: Party-list (DPP)
- In office 1 February 1993 – 20 December 1997
- Constituency: Pingtung County

Member of the National Assembly
- In office 1 February 1987 – 31 January 1993

Personal details
- Born: 22 October 1956 (age 69) Pingtung County, Taiwan
- Party: Democratic Progressive Party
- Spouse: Hung Heng-chu (洪恆珠)
- Education: National Taiwan Ocean University (BS); National Sun Yat-sen University (MPA)

Su Jia-chyuan (or Su Chia-chyuan; Chinese: 蘇嘉全; pinyin: Sū Jiāquán; born 22 October 1956) is a Taiwanese politician of the Democratic Progressive Party (DPP) who served as the President of the Legislative Yuan from 2016 to 2020.

As the first non-Kuomintang President of the Legislative Yuan, Su is an at-large legislator and previously Commissioner of Pingtung County, and held national posts as Minister of the Interior and Minister of Agriculture under President Chen Shui-bian's administration. From May to August 2020, he briefly served as Secretary General to the President under the Tsai Ing-wen administration.

== Education ==
After graduating from National Pingtung Senior High School, Su studied food science as an undergraduate at National Taiwan Ocean University and graduated with a bachelor's degree in 1979. He then earned a Master of Public Affairs (M.P.A.) from National Sun Yat-sen University.

== Political career ==
=== Taichung mayoralty candidacy (2010) ===
In 2010, Su narrowly lost to Jason Hu in the election for Mayor of Taichung.

=== Vice presidential candidacy (2012) ===
The DPP presidential candidate, Tsai Ing-wen, announced Su as her running mate in the 2012 presidential election. However, the ticket lost to the incumbent president Ma Ying-jeou, who sought a second term.

=== 2016 legislative elections ===
In 2016 legislative elections Su placed on the proportional representation ballot, and won a seat in the Legislative Yuan.

Su was elected the eleventh President of the Legislative Yuan on 1 February 2016, when the members of the ninth Legislative Yuan met for the first time. Su became the first DPP and non-KMT speaker in the Legislative Yuan.

== Later political career ==
Su was named Secretary-General to the President on 20 May 2020. He resigned on 2 August 2020, following allegations of bribery against his nephew, legislator Su Chen-ching. In May 2022, Su succeeded Chiou I-jen as chairperson of the Taiwan–Japan Relations Association. in January 2026, Su was named chair of the Straits Exchange Foundation.

== Controversy ==
Su was impeached by the Control Yuan on 3 September 2012, for illegally constructing a luxury farmhouse on agricultural land without engaging in any agriculture. Su's villa, built on agricultural land, was a controversial issue in the 2012 presidential elections.

Political offices
Preceded by Wang Jin-pyng	President of the Legislative Yuan; 2016–2020	Succeeded by Yu Shyi-kun
Preceded by Chen Chu	Secretary General to the President; 2020	Succeeded by Liu Chien-sin (acting); David Lee
