= Office of the President (Taiwan) =

Office of the President of the Republic of China in Taipei, Taiwan

- 總統府; Zǒngtǒngfǔ (Mandarin); Chóng-thóng-hú (Taiwanese); Chúng-thúng-fú (Hakka)
- Emblem

- Logo

Agency overview
- Formed: May 20, 1948
- Jurisdiction: Republic of China
- Headquarters: Zhongzheng, Taipei, Taiwan
- Employees: 529
- Annual budget: NT$ 2 billion
- Agency executive: Pan Men-an, Secretary-General
- Parent agency: President
- Child agencies: Academia Sinica; Academia Historica
- Website: english.president.gov.tw

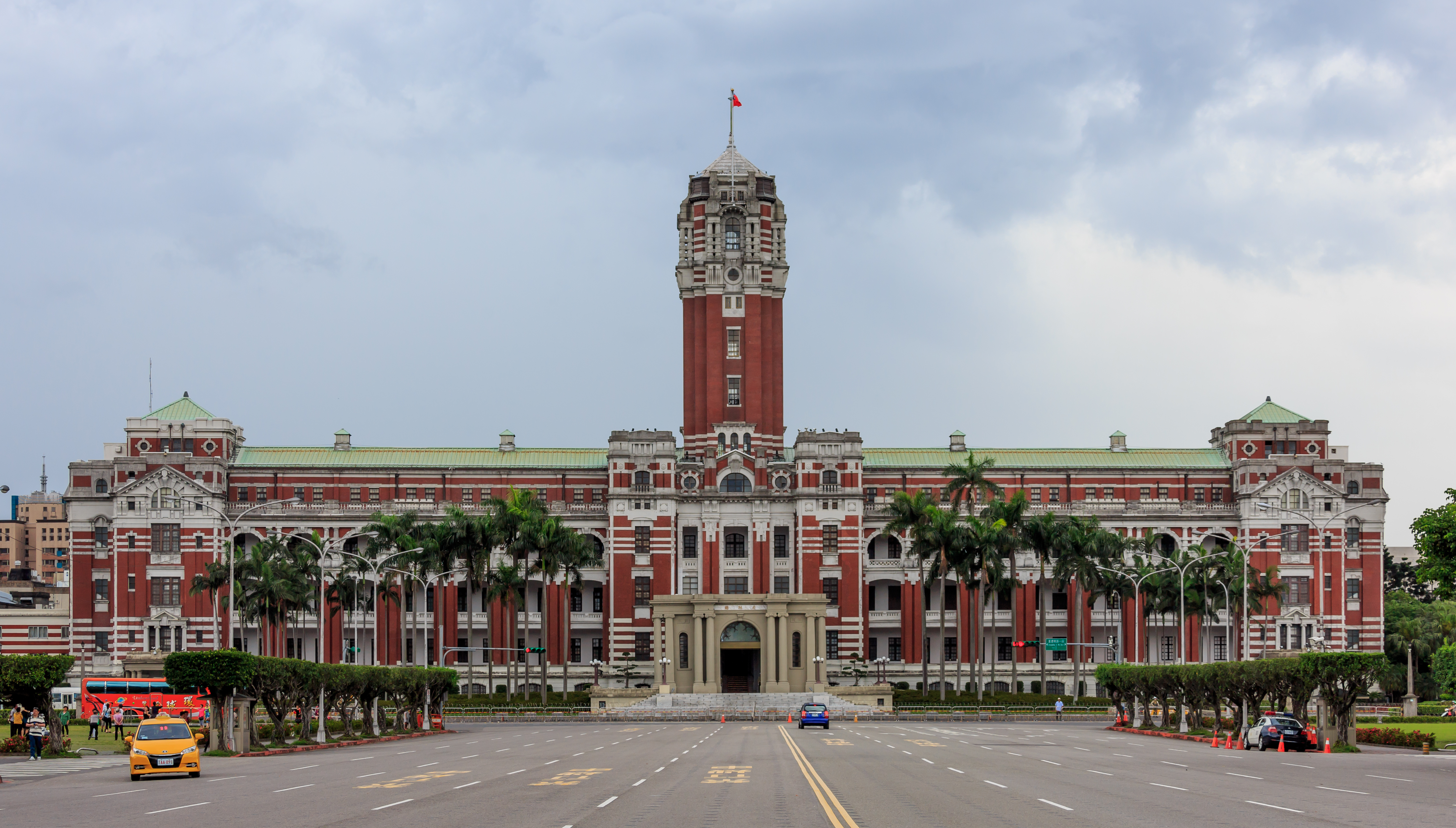
Presidential Office Building in Taipei

The Office of the President (Chinese: 總統府; pinyin: Zǒngtǒngfǔ; Pe̍h-ōe-jī: Chóng-thóng-hú) is an organ of the Republic of China (Taiwan) that handles the general administrative affairs of the President and the Vice President. The office, together with the National Security Council, serve as the two advisory agencies to the President.

The Office of the President is led by a Secretary-General and oversees the Academia Sinica (Note: lit. 'Chinese Academy'; Chinese: 中央硏究院; pinyin: Zhōngyāng Yánjiùyuàn; Pe̍h-ōe-jī: Tiong-iong Gián-kiù-īⁿ) and Academia Historica. (Note: lit. 'Historical Academy'; Chinese: 國史館; pinyin: Guóshǐguǎn; Pe̍h-ōe-jī: Kok-sú-koán)

== History ==
The Office of the President was established according to the Constitution of the Republic of China on May 20, 1948, in the Presidential Palace in Nanjing, with the inauguration of the first President Chiang Kai-shek and the first Vice President Li Zongren.

However, with the outbreak of Chinese Civil War, the government of the Republic of China retreated to Taiwan in December 1949. On March 1, 1950, Chiang Kai-shek resumed his presidency in the former office of the Japanese Government-General of Taiwan in Taipei. The building is used as the Presidential Office Building since then.

== Organization ==
- First Bureau
- Second Bureau
- Third Bureau
- Department of Special Affairs
- Department of Security Affairs
- Department of Public Affairs
- Personnel Department
- Department of Accounting and Statistics
- Government Ethics Department
- Legal Affairs Committee
- Academia Sinica (Chinese: 中央硏究院; pinyin: Zhōngyāng Yánjiùyuàn; Pe̍h-ōe-jī: Tiong-iong Gián-kiù-īⁿ)
- Academia Historica (Chinese: 國史館; pinyin: Guóshǐguǎn; Pe̍h-ōe-jī: Kok-sú-koán)

== Secretaries-General ==
The Secretary-General to the President is the highest-ranking official in the Office of the President and supervises the staff of the Office. On 20 May 2024, Pan Men-an was appointed to the position.

== See also ==
- National Security Council (Taiwan)
