= Joseph Wu =

Taiwanese politician (born 1954)

Wu Jau-shieh
- 吳釗燮
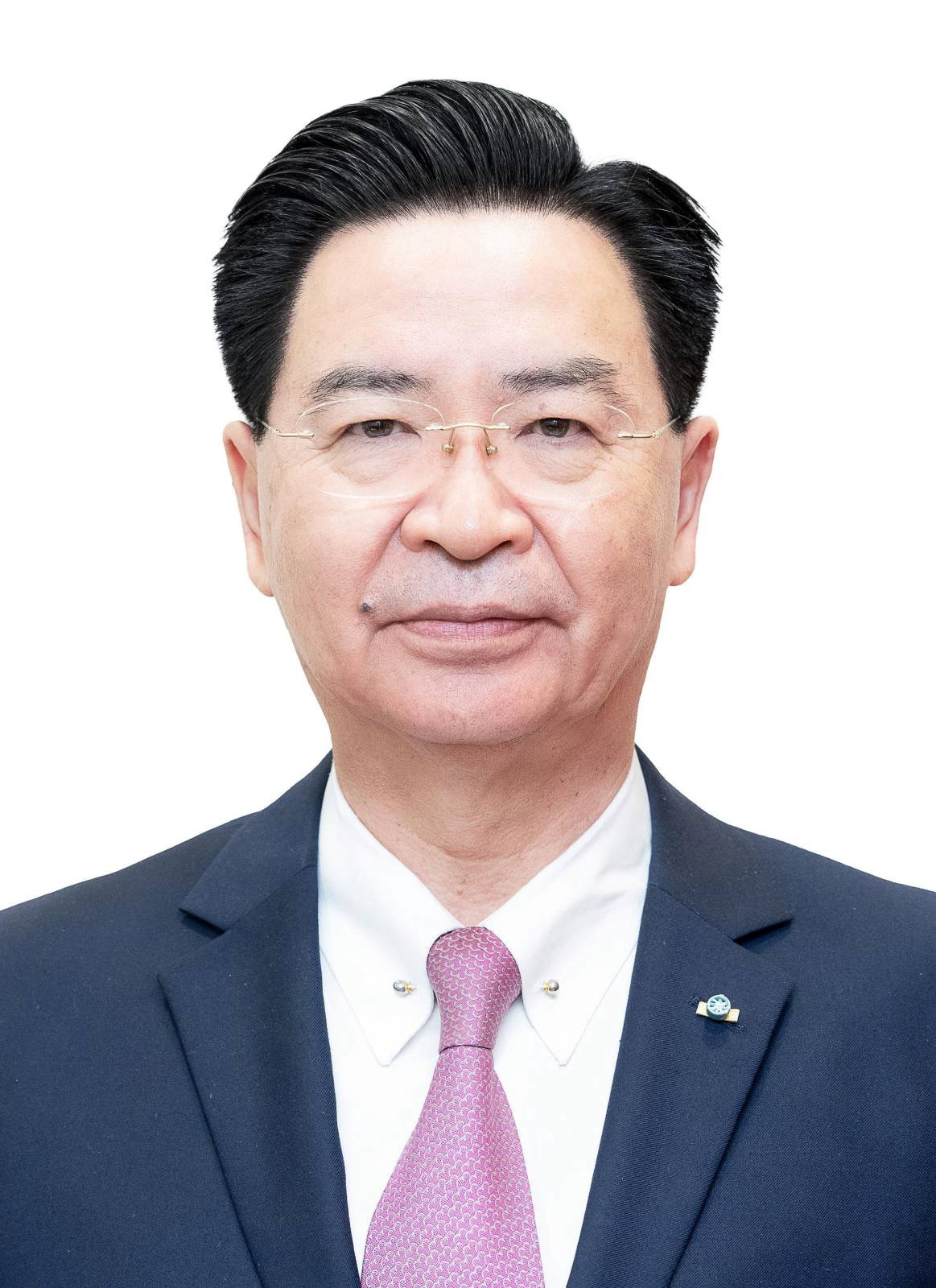
- Official portrait, 2024

15th & 19th Secretary-General of the National Security Council
- Incumbent
- Assumed office 20 May 2024
- President: Lai Ching-te
- Deputy: See list: Lin Fei-fan Hsu Szu-chien Liu Te-chin Vincent Chao Lii Wen
- Preceded by: Wellington Koo
- In office 20 May 2016 – 22 May 2017
- President: Tsai Ing-wen
- Deputy: See list: Chen Chun-lin; York Chen
- Preceded by: Kao Hua-chu
- Succeeded by: Yen Teh-fa

27th Minister of Foreign Affairs
- In office 26 February 2018 – 20 May 2024
- Prime Minister: Lai Ching-te; Su Tseng-Chang; Chen Chien-jen
- Deputy: Deputy Minister: Hou Ching-shan, Kelly Hsieh Hsu Szu-chien, Tseng Hou-jen, Tien Chung-kwang; Vice Minister: José María Liu, Miguel Tsao
- Preceded by: David Lee
- Succeeded by: Lin Chia-lung

34th Secretary-General to the President
- In office 22 May 2017 – 26 February 2018
- President: Tsai Ing-wen
- Deputy: Liu Chien-sin; Yao Jen-to
- Preceded by: Liu Chien-sin (acting)
- Succeeded by: Liu Chien-sin (acting)

20th Secretary-General of the Democratic Progressive Party
- In office 28 May 2014 – 24 May 2016
- Chairwomen: Tsai Ing-wen
- Preceded by: Lin Hsi-yao
- Succeeded by: Hung Yao-fu

10th Ambassador of Taiwan to the United States
- In office 10 April 2007 – 26 July 2008
- President: Chen Shui-bian; Ma Ying-jeou
- Preceded by: David Lee
- Succeeded by: Jason Yuan

7th Minister of the Mainland Affairs Council
- In office 20 May 2004 – 10 April 2007
- Prime Minister: Yu Shyi-kun; Frank Hsieh; Su Tseng-chang
- Preceded by: Tsai Ing-wen
- Succeeded by: Chen Ming-tong

Personal details
- Born: October 31, 1954 (age 71) Dacheng, Changhua County, Taiwan
- Party: Democratic Progressive Party (since 2002)
- Education: National Chengchi University (BA); University of Missouri (MA); Ohio State University (PhD)

Chinese name
- Traditional Chinese: 吳釗燮
- Simplified Chinese: 呉钊燮
Transcriptions
Standard Mandarin
- Hanyu Pinyin: Wú Zhāoxiè
- Gwoyeu Romatzyh: Wu Jaushieh
- Wade–Giles: Wú Chāo-hsièh
- Tongyong Pinyin: Wú Jhaosiè
- Yale Romanization: Wú Jāusyè
- IPA: [tɕjàŋ tʰǐŋfǔ]
Yue: Cantonese
- Jyutping: Ng^{4} Ciu^{1}-sit^{8}
Southern Min
- Tâi-lô: Ngôo Tsiau-siat

Wu Jau-shieh (Chinese: 吳釗燮; pinyin: Wú Zhāoxiè; Tâi-lô: Ngôo Tsiau-siat; born October 31, 1954), also known by his English name Joseph Wu, is a Taiwanese political scientist and diplomat currently serving as secretary-general of the National Security Council since 2024. He was formerly the foreign minister from 2018 to 2024 and secretary-general to the presidential office of Tsai Ing-wen from 2017 to 2018.

After earning his doctorate from Ohio State University, Wu became a political science professor. From 2007 to 2008, he was Chief Representative of Taiwan to the United States as the head of the Taipei Economic and Cultural Representative Office in Washington, D.C., having been appointed to that position by President Chen Shui-bian to succeed his predecessor, David Lee, who was appointed Minister of Foreign Affairs. On February 26, 2018, he succeeded Lee in that role as well.

== Early life and education ==
Wu was born on 31 October 1954 in Changhua County, Taiwan. He was raised in Dacheng Township, a rural community in the county's coastal region. He belonged to a prominent local family whose members held differing political views: his uncle Wu Li-pei (吳澧培) was a prominent advocate of Taiwanese independence, while another uncle, Wu Shu-pei (吳澍培), supported Chinese unification.

Wu attended Taichung First Senior High School. He then graduated from National Chengchi University with a Bachelor of Arts in 1978. In 1979, he traveled to the United States to pursue graduate studies in political science. He earned a Master of Arts in political science from the University of Missouri–St. Louis in 1982. He then earned his Ph.D. in political science from Ohio State University in 1989. During his time at Ohio State, he worked as a research assistant in the university's political science department. His doctoral dissertation was titled, Toward Another Miracle? Impetuses and Obstacles in Taiwan's Democratization.

== Political career ==
After receiving his doctorate, Wu was a faculty member in the political science department at Ohio State University and was deputy director of the Institute of International Relations of National Chengchi University in Taiwan.

Formerly the Deputy Secretary General of the Presidential Office for President Chen Shui-bian, Wu was appointed the minister of the Mainland Affairs Council, the body charged with coordinating relations with mainland China (the People's Republic of China), by Chen in May 2004.

His appointment as minister of the Mainland Affairs Council proved somewhat controversial due to his reputation as a supporter of Taiwan independence, especially in light of the simultaneous appointment as foreign minister of former independence activist Mark Chen. His tenure as head of TECRO lasted one year and three months.

In May 2016, Wu joined Tsai Ing-wen's administration as Secretary-General of the National Security Council. Following a brief tenure as Secretary-General to the President from May 2017 to February 2018, he transitioned to the Lai cabinet as Minister of Foreign Affairs. He held this post for six years until the end of the Presidency of Tsai Ing-wen in 2024. With the start of the Presidency of Lai Ching-te in May 2024, he returned to his role as Secretary-General of the National Security Council.

== Cross-strait relations ==
On April 11, 2013, the ROC Cabinet approved a bill to establish a Straits Exchange Foundation (SEF) branch office in mainland China and an Association for Relations Across the Taiwan Straits (ARATS) office in Taiwan. Wu - who was once the ROC Minister of Mainland Affairs Council - said that for the ARATS office to be established in Taiwan, it would need to have three prerequisites: the office should never evolve to become like the PRC Liaison Office in Hong Kong; the office's mandate must be clearly defined; and the officers must adhere to international diplomatic regulations.

In May 2021, he became the first person listed on the “diehard supporters of Taiwan independence” blacklist proposed by the Chinese government.

On November 5, 2021, Wu was sanctioned by the Taiwan Affairs Office of the People's Republic of China as a "diehard "Taiwan independence" separatist" for "fanning up hostility across the Taiwan Strait and maliciously smearing the mainland".

== Honors ==
- Republic of China
  - Special Grand Cordon of the Order of Brilliant Star (2024)

== Publications ==
=== Articles ===
- Defending Taiwan by Defending Ukraine, Foreign Affairs, May 9, 2024
- Strong US-Taiwanese ties needed to counter rising Chinese influence in the Pacific, The Hill, October 9, 2019 (co-authored with Cory Gardner)

Government offices
Preceded by David Lee	Taiwanese Representative to the United States; 2007–2008	Succeeded by Jason Yuan
Preceded by David Lee	Minister of Foreign Affairs; 2018–2024	Succeeded by Lin Chia-lung
