= Tseng Ho-jen =

Taiwanese diplomat

Harry Ho-jen Tseng
- 曾厚仁
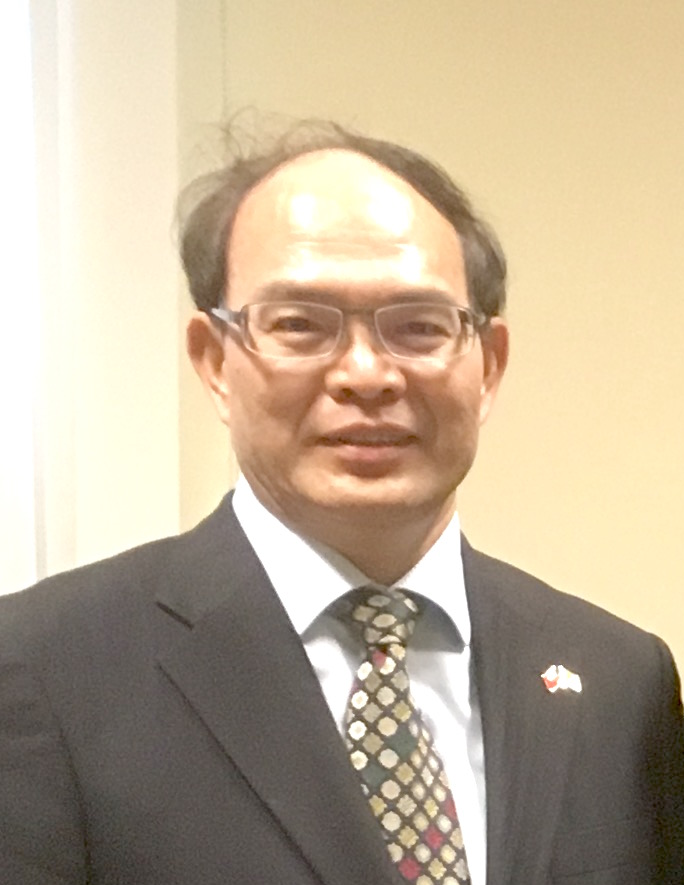

Deputy Minister of Foreign Affairs of the Republic of China
- In office 24 July 2020 – August 2022 Serving with Tien Chung-kwang
- Minister: Joseph Wu
- Vice: Miguel Tsao
- Preceded by: Kelly Hsieh

ROC Representative to European Union and Belgium
- In office 2017–2020
- Preceded by: Tung Kuo-yu
- Succeeded by: Tsai Ming-yen

ROC Ambassador to Palau
- In office 2014–2016

ROC Representative to Ireland
- In office 2010–2014

Personal details
- Born: 1959 (age 66–67)
- Education: National Taiwan University (BA); National Chengchi University (MA); Princeton University (MPA); University of Virginia (PhD)

Harry Ho-jen Tseng (Chinese: 曾厚仁; born 1959) is a Taiwanese diplomat who served as Deputy Minister of Foreign Affairs of Taiwan from 2020 to 2022. He has been Taiwan's representative to Canada since 2022.

== Education ==
Tseng graduated from National Taiwan University with a bachelor's degree in foreign languages and literature. He then worked for the Ministry of Foreign Affairs (MOFA) between 1985 and 1989, leaving to pursue advanced degrees in the United States at Princeton University, where he graduated from the Woodrow Wilson School of Public and International Affairs with a Master of Public Administration (M.P.A.) in 1991. Afterwards, Tseng completed doctoral studies at the University of Virginia, where he earned a Ph.D. in international relations.

== Career ==
After completing his studies, Tseng returned to the foreign ministry on the advice of David Lee in 1993. By 2002, Tseng was a section chief at MOFA's Department of North American affairs and an English–Chinese translator for President Chen Shui-bian. He was later appointed department head. Between 2010 and 2014, Tseng was Taiwan's representative to Ireland. He then served as ambassador to Palau. After Tsai Ing-wen became president, Tseng served as deputy secretary-general of the Presidential Office. In August 2016, Tseng assumed the same position at the National Security Council. In 2017, Tseng was named representative to the European Union and Belgium. In June 2020, Tseng was named a deputy foreign minister. Tseng's appointment as Taiwan's representative to Canada was announced in June 2022.
