= Secretary-General to the President (Republic of China) =

Secretary-General to the President 總統府秘書長
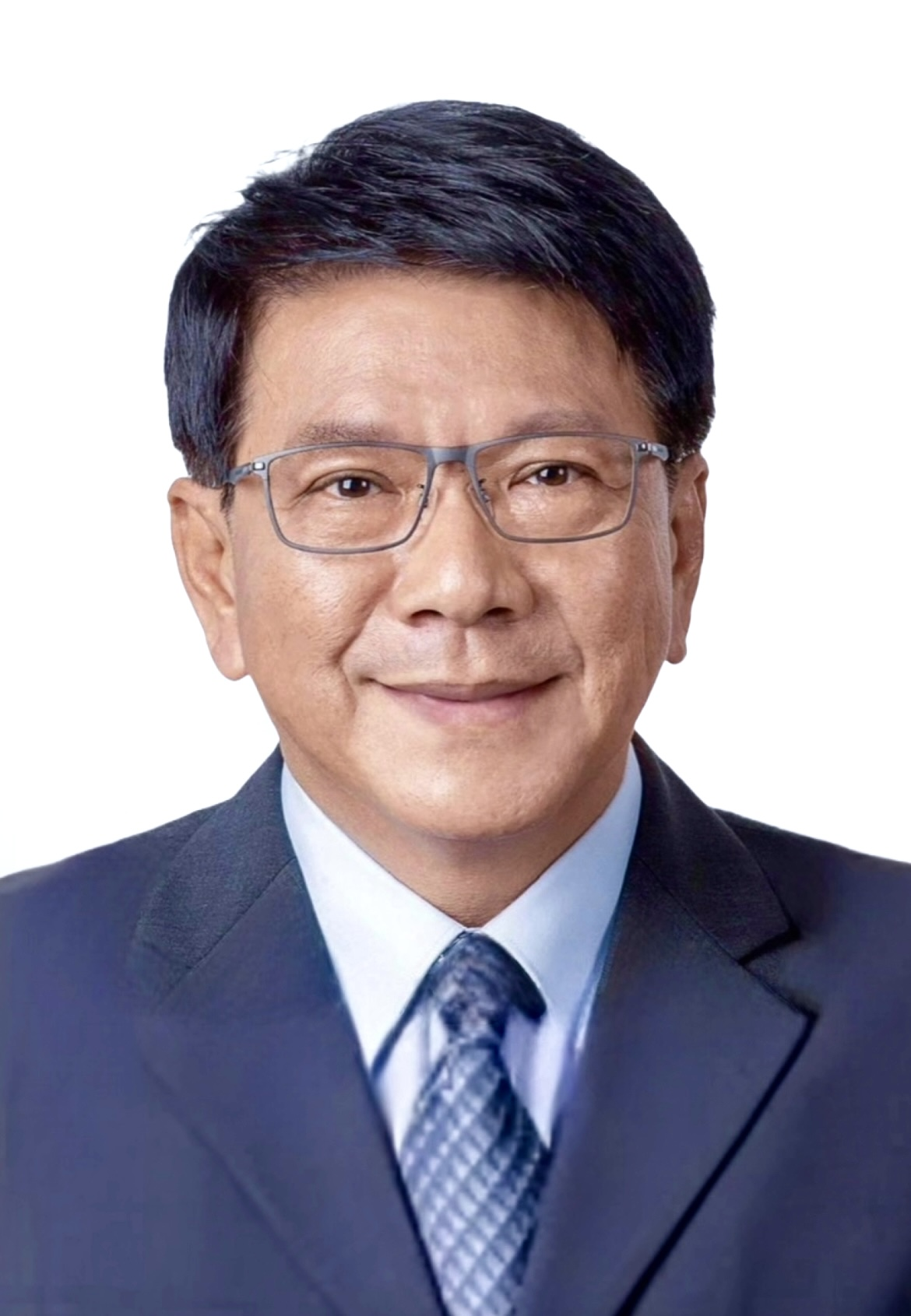
- Incumbent; Pan Men-an since 20 May 2024
- Reports to: President
- Appointer: President
- Term length: At the pleasure of the president
- Constituting instrument: Office of the President Organization Act
- Formation: 20 May 1948 (Office of the President established); 26 January 1996 (Current Organization Act)
- First holder: Wu Dingchang
- Deputy: Ho Chih-wei, Xavier Chang
- Website: english.president.gov.tw (in English)

The secretary-general to the president is the highest-ranking official in the Office of the President, Republic of China, and supervises the staff of the office. The current secretary-general is Pan Men-an.

== Duties ==
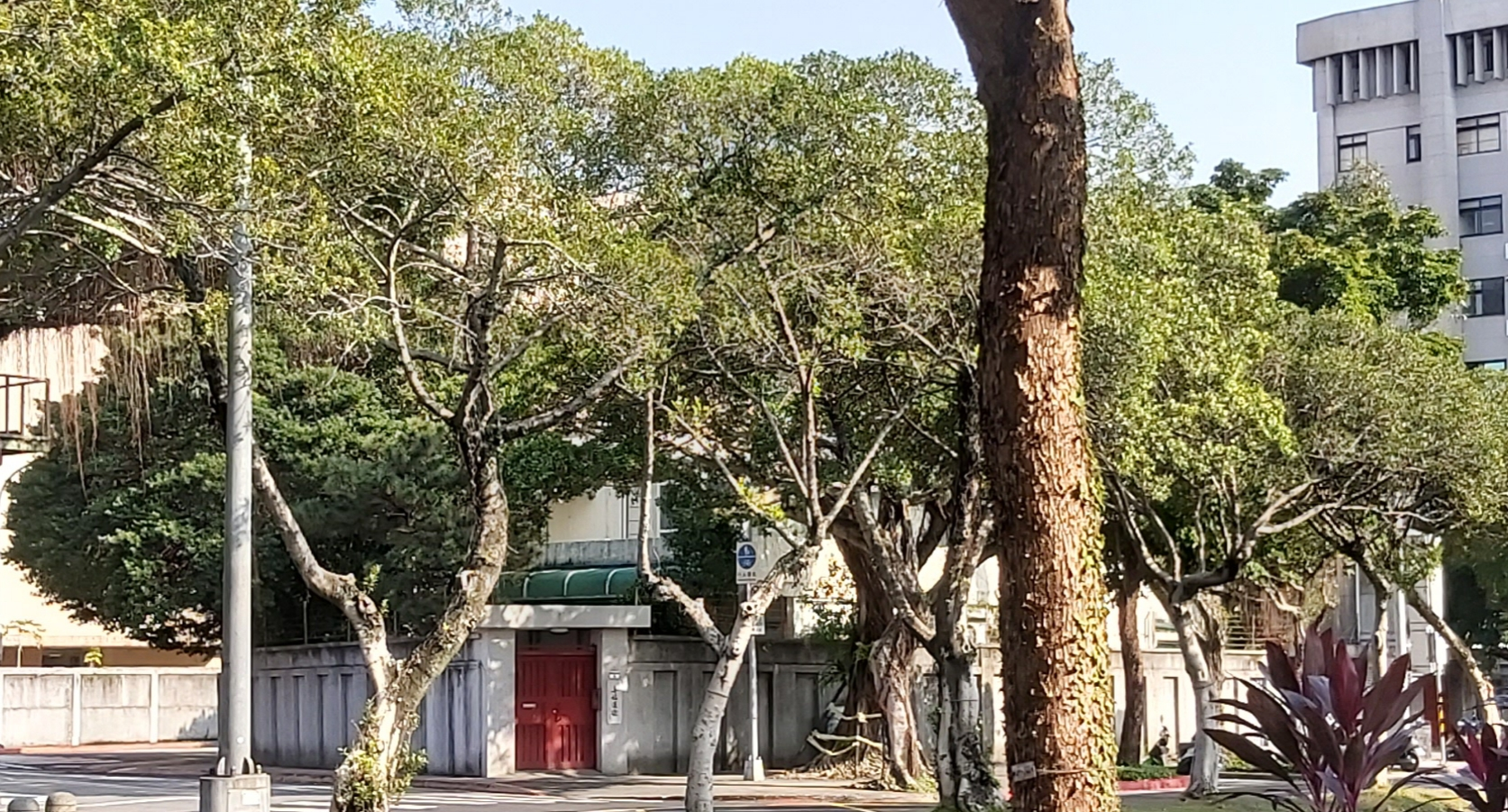
Official residence of Secretary-General to the President

According to Article 9 of the Office of the President Organization Act, "The Office of the President shall have one secretary-general to the president. The secretary-general shall be a special-grade political appointee and shall, under the direction of the president, take overall charge of the affairs of the Office of the President and direct and supervise all staff."

=== Deputy secretaries-general ===
The secretary-general is assisted by two deputy secretaries-general. The current deputy secretaries-general are Ho Chih-wei and Xavier Chang.

== List of secretaries-general ==
Kuomintang (Nationalist) Democratic Progressive Party Independent/ unknown

No.	Name		Term of office		Political party	President
1	Wu Dingchang	吳鼎昌	March 1948	December 1948	Kuomintang	Chiang Kai-shek
2	Wu Zhongxin	吳忠信	December 1948	February 1949	Kuomintang	Chiang Kai-shek
3	Weng Wenhao	翁文灝	March 1949	June 1949	Kuomintang	Chiang Kai-shek
4	Qiu Changwei	邱昌渭	26 June 1949	March 1950	Kuomintang	Chiang Kai-shek
5	Wang Shijie	王世杰	23 March 1950	16 November 1953	Kuomintang	Chiang Kai-shek
—	Xu Jingzhi	許靜芝	17 November 1953	17 May 1954	Kuomintang	Chiang Kai-shek
6	Zhang Qun	張群	18 May 1954	28 May 1972	Kuomintang	Chiang Kai-shek
7	Zheng Yanfen	鄭彥棻	29 May 1972	19 May 1978	Kuomintang	Chiang Kai-shek; Yen Chia-kan
8	Chiang Yen-si	蔣彥士	20 May 1978	19 December 1978	Kuomintang	Chiang Ching-kuo
9	Ma Chi-chuang	馬紀壯	20 December 1978	31 May 1984	Kuomintang	Chiang Ching-kuo
10	Shen Chang-huan	沈昌煥	1 June 1984	16 October 1988	Kuomintang	Chiang Ching-kuo; Lee Teng-hui
11	Lee Yuan-tsu	李元簇	18 October 1988	19 May 1990	Kuomintang	Lee Teng-hui
12	Chiang Yen-si	蔣彥士	20 May 1990	12 December 1994	Kuomintang	Lee Teng-hui
13	Wu Po-hsiung	吳伯雄	19 December 1994	4 August 1996	Kuomintang	Lee Teng-hui
14	Huang Kun-huei	黃昆輝	5 August 1996	17 November 1999	Kuomintang	Lee Teng-hui
15	John Chiang	章孝嚴	18 November 1999	22 December 1999	Kuomintang	Lee Teng-hui
16	Ting Mao-shih	丁懋時	12 December 1999	19 May 2000	Kuomintang	Lee Teng-hui
17	Chang Chun-hsiung	張俊雄	20 May 2000	31 July 2000	Democratic Progressive	Chen Shui-bian
—	Chen Che-nan	陳哲男	1 August 2000	5 October 2000	Democratic Progressive	Chen Shui-bian
18	Yu Shyi-kun	游錫堃	6 October 2000	31 January 2002	Democratic Progressive	Chen Shui-bian
19	Chen Shih-meng	陳師孟	1 February 2002	5 February 2003	Democratic Progressive	Chen Shui-bian
20	Chiou I-jen	邱義仁	6 February 2003	19 May 2004	Democratic Progressive	Chen Shui-bian
21	Su Tseng-chang	蘇貞昌	20 May 2004	31 January 2005	Democratic Progressive	Chen Shui-bian
22	Yu Shyi-kun	游錫堃	1 February 2005	16 December 2005	Democratic Progressive	Chen Shui-bian
—	Ma Yung-chen	馬永成	17 December 2005	24 January 2006	Democratic Progressive	Chen Shui-bian
23	Chen Tan-sun	陳唐山	25 January 2006	6 February 2007	Democratic Progressive	Chen Shui-bian
24	Chiou I-jen	邱義仁	6 February 2007	20 May 2007	Democratic Progressive	Chen Shui-bian
—	Cho Jung-tai	卓榮泰	21 May 2007	19 August 2007	Democratic Progressive	Chen Shui-bian
25	Yeh Chu-lan	葉菊蘭	20 August 2007	22 March 2008	Democratic Progressive	Chen Shui-bian
26	Chen Tan-sun	陳唐山	23 March 2008	20 May 2008	Democratic Progressive	Chen Shui-bian
27	Chan Chun-po	詹春柏	20 May 2008	9 September 2009	Kuomintang	Ma Ying-jeou
28	Liao Liou-yi	廖了以	10 September 2009	30 January 2011	Kuomintang	Ma Ying-jeou
29	Wu Jin-lin	伍錦霖	31 January 2011	5 February 2012	Kuomintang	Ma Ying-jeou
30	Tseng Yung-chuan	曾永權	6 February 2012	26 September 2012	Kuomintang	Ma Ying-jeou
31	Timothy Yang	楊進添	27 September 2012	11 February 2015	Kuomintang	Ma Ying-jeou
32	Tseng Yung-chuan	曾永權	12 February 2015	19 May 2016	Kuomintang	Ma Ying-jeou
33	Lin Bih-jaw	林碧炤	20 May 2016	19 October 2016	Kuomintang (Note: Membership suspended)	Tsai Ing-wen
—	Liu Chien-sin	劉建忻	20 October 2016	17 May 2017	Democratic Progressive	Tsai Ing-wen
34	Joseph Wu	吳釗燮	18 May 2017	26 February 2018	Democratic Progressive	Tsai Ing-wen
—	Liu Chien-sin	劉建忻	26 February 2018	23 April 2018	Democratic Progressive	Tsai Ing-wen
35	Chen Chu	陳菊	23 April 2018	20 May 2020	Democratic Progressive	Tsai Ing-wen
36	Su Jia-chyuan	蘇嘉全	20 May 2020	2 August 2020	Democratic Progressive	Tsai Ing-wen
—	Liu Chien-sin	劉建忻	2 August 2020	3 August 2020	Democratic Progressive	Tsai Ing-wen
37	David Lee	李大維	3 August 2020	31 January 2023	Kuomintang	Tsai Ing-wen
38	Lin Chia-lung	林佳龍	31 January 2023	20 May 2024	Democratic Progressive	Tsai Ing-wen
39	Pan Men-an	潘孟安	20 May 2024	Incumbent	Democratic Progressive	William Lai

== See also ==
- Presidential Office Building, Taipei
