= National Security Council (Taiwan) =

Government agency of Republic of China

- 國家安全會議; Guójiā Ᾱnquán Huìyì (Mandarin); Kok-ka An-choân Hōe-gī (Taiwanese); Koet-kâ Ôn-chhiòn Fi-ngi (Hakka)
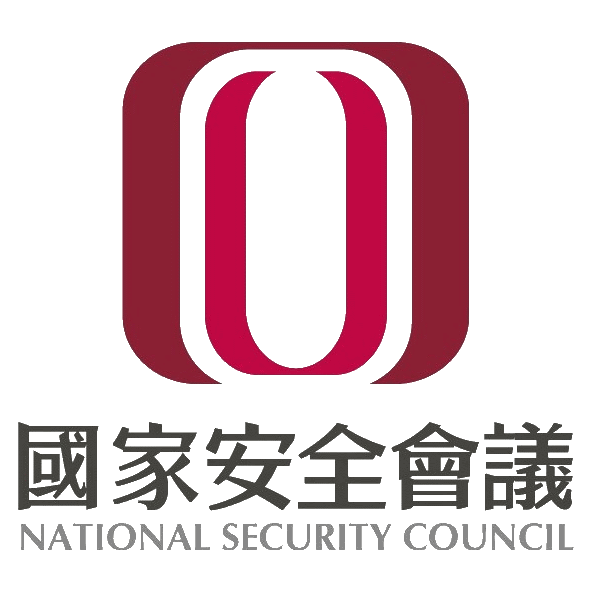

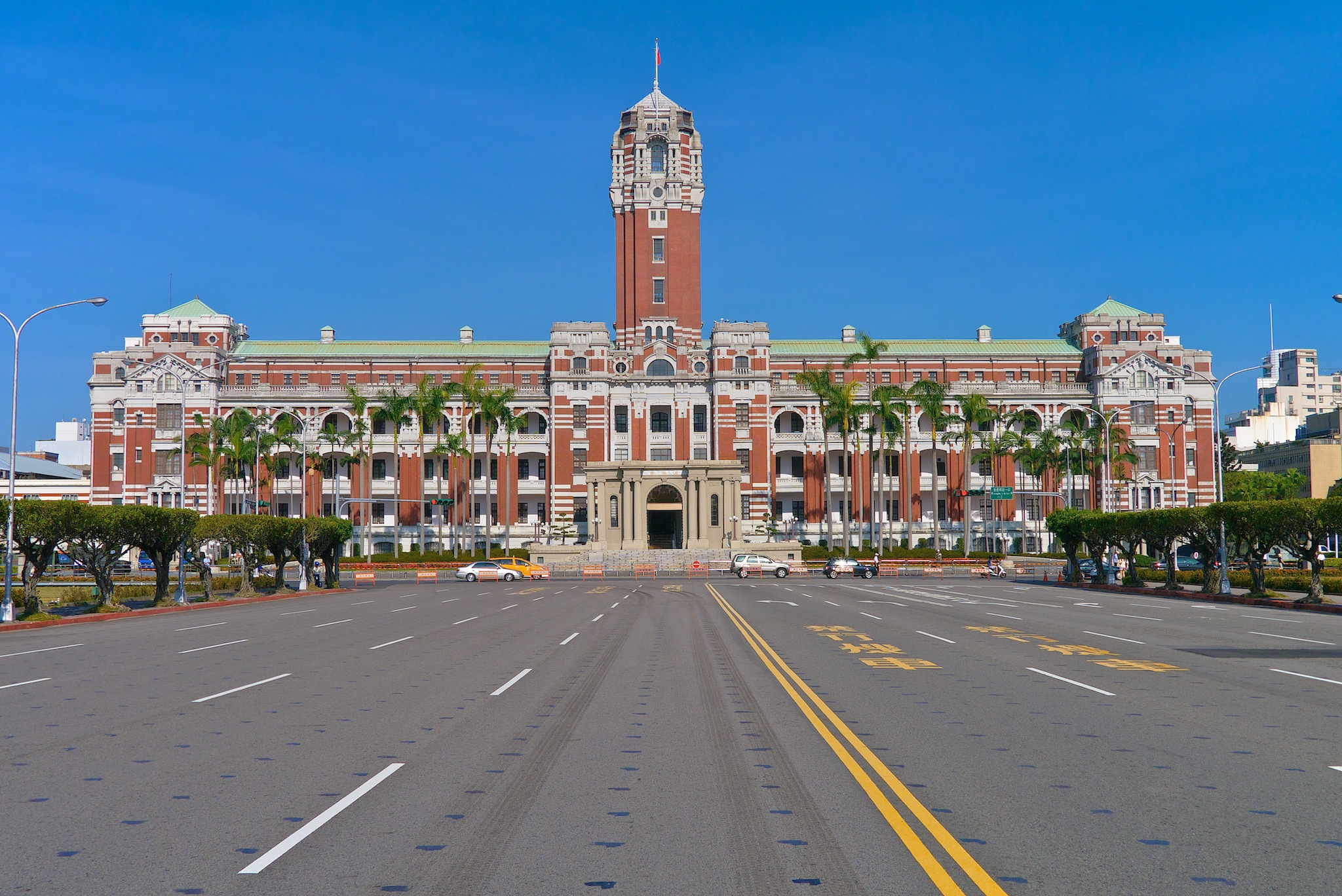
- Office of the President

Agency overview
- Formed: 20 February 1951 (as National Defense Council); 16 February 1967 (as National Security Council)
- Jurisdiction: Republic of China (Taiwan)
- Headquarters: Zhongzheng, Taipei
- Agency executives: William Lai, Chairman; Joseph Wu, Secretary-General; Lin Fei-fan, Lii Wen, Deputy Secretary-General
- Parent agency: President of the Republic of China
- Child agency: National Security Bureau

The National Security Council (NSC; Chinese: 國家安全會議; pinyin: Guójiā Ᾱnquán Huìyì; Pe̍h-ōe-jī: Kok-ka An-choân Hōe-gī) is an organ of the Republic of China (Taiwan) directly under the chairmanship of the President to advise on issues related to national security.

Members of the NSC also consist of the Vice President, the Premier, the heads of key ministries, the Chief of the General Staff, the NSC Secretary-General and the Director-General of the National Security Bureau.

== History ==
During the fourth meeting of the first session of the National Assembly in March 1966 in Taipei, the temporary provision effective during the Period of Mobilization for the Suppression of Communist Rebellion was revised.

The fourth clause of this amendment authorized the President to establish organs for mobilization to suppress the rebellion of the Chinese Communist Party, determine policies related to the period of mobilization and deal with war politics. President Chiang Kai-shek ordered Huang Shao-ku, Wang Yun-wu, Chang Chi-yun and Chiang Ching-kuo to organize a small preparatory committee to establish a National Security Council and to draft an organizational program.

In February 1967, President Chiang promulgated an organizational outline for a National Security Council during the mobilization period. Huang Shao-ku was chosen to be the first secretary general and Chiang Ching-kuo was placed in charge of the key works. This marked the establishment of the NSC.

== Membership ==
Structure of the National Security Council
Chairperson	President
Statutory Attendees	Vice President
Statutory Attendees	Premier; Vice Premier; Minister of the Interior; Minister of Foreign Affairs; Minister of National Defense; Minister of Finance; Minister of Economic Affairs; Minister of Mainland Affairs Council; Chief of the General Staff
Statutory Attendees	Secretary-General of National Security Council; Director-General of National Security Bureau
Additional Participants	Personnel appointed by the President

== Secretaries-General ==
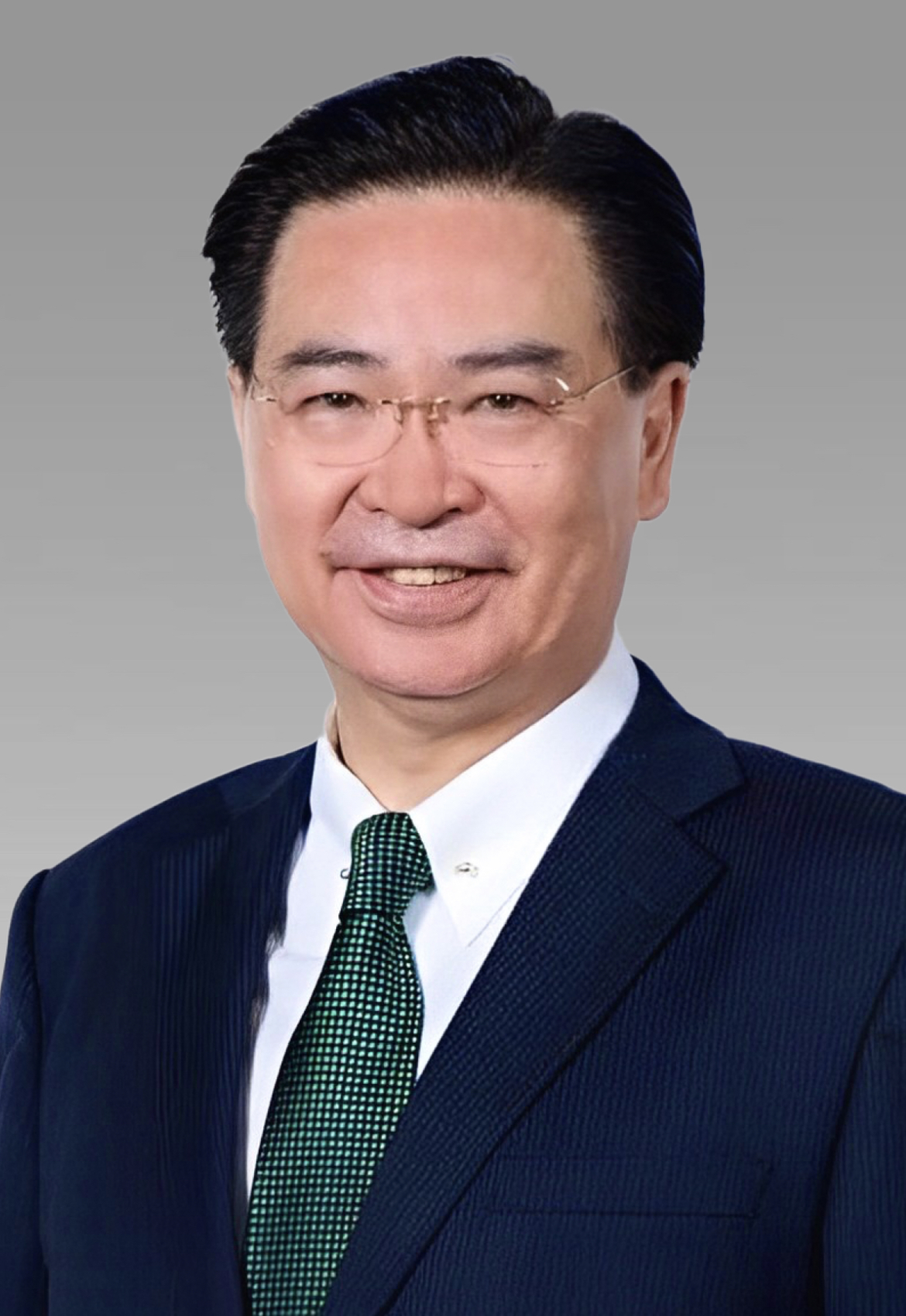
Joseph Wu, the incumbent Secretary-General of National Security Council.

=== National Defense Council ===
- Kuo Chi-chiao (20 February 1951 – 26 May 1954)
- Chou Tse-jou (July 1954 – August 1957)
- Zhang Qun (August 1957 – June 1959)
- Gu Zhutong (29 June 1959 – 1 February 1967)

=== National Security Council ===
- Huang Shao-ku (1 February 1967 – 20 June 1979)
- Shen Chang-huan (20 June 1979 – 28 March 1984)
- Wang Tao-yuan (28 May 1984 – 16 June 1986)
- Chiang Wei-kuo (18 June 1986 – 28 February 1993)
- Shih Chi-yang (2 March 1993 – 1 September 1994)
- Ting Mao-shih (1 September 1994 – 31 January 1999)
- Yin Tsung-wen (1 February 1999 – 20 May 2000)
- Chuang Ming-yao (20 May 2000 – 16 August 2001)
- Ting Yu-chou (16 August 2001 – 7 March 2002)
- Chiou I-jen (7 March 2002 – 5 February 2003)
- Kang Ning-hsiang (5 February 2003 – 20 May 2004)
- Chiou I-jen (20 May 2004 – 6 February 2007)
- Mark Chen (6 February 2007 – 27 March 2008)
- Chen Chung-hsin (27 March 2008 – 20 May 2008) (acting)
- Su Chi (20 May 2008 – 23 February 2010)
- Hu Wei-jen (23 February 2010 – 25 September 2012)
- Jason Yuan (26 September 2012 – 24 March 2014)
- King Pu-tsung (25 March 2014 – 12 February 2015)
- Kao Hua-chu (12 February 2015 – 20 May 2016)
- Joseph Wu (20 May 2016 – 18 May 2017)
- Yen Teh-fa (18 May 2017 – 26 February 2018)
- David Lee (26 February 2018 – 19 May 2020)
- Wellington Koo (20 May 2020 – 19 May 2024)
- Joseph Wu (20 May 2024 –)

== See also ==
- National security council
