= Justice Alliance =

Justice Alliance may refer to:

- Justice Alliance (Hong Kong), Hong Kong political party
- Justice Alliance faction, faction of the Democratic Progressive Party in Taiwan

== See also ==
- Alliance for Justice
- Justice League (disambiguation)
