= 2008 Democratic Progressive Party chairmanship election =

- 18 May 2008
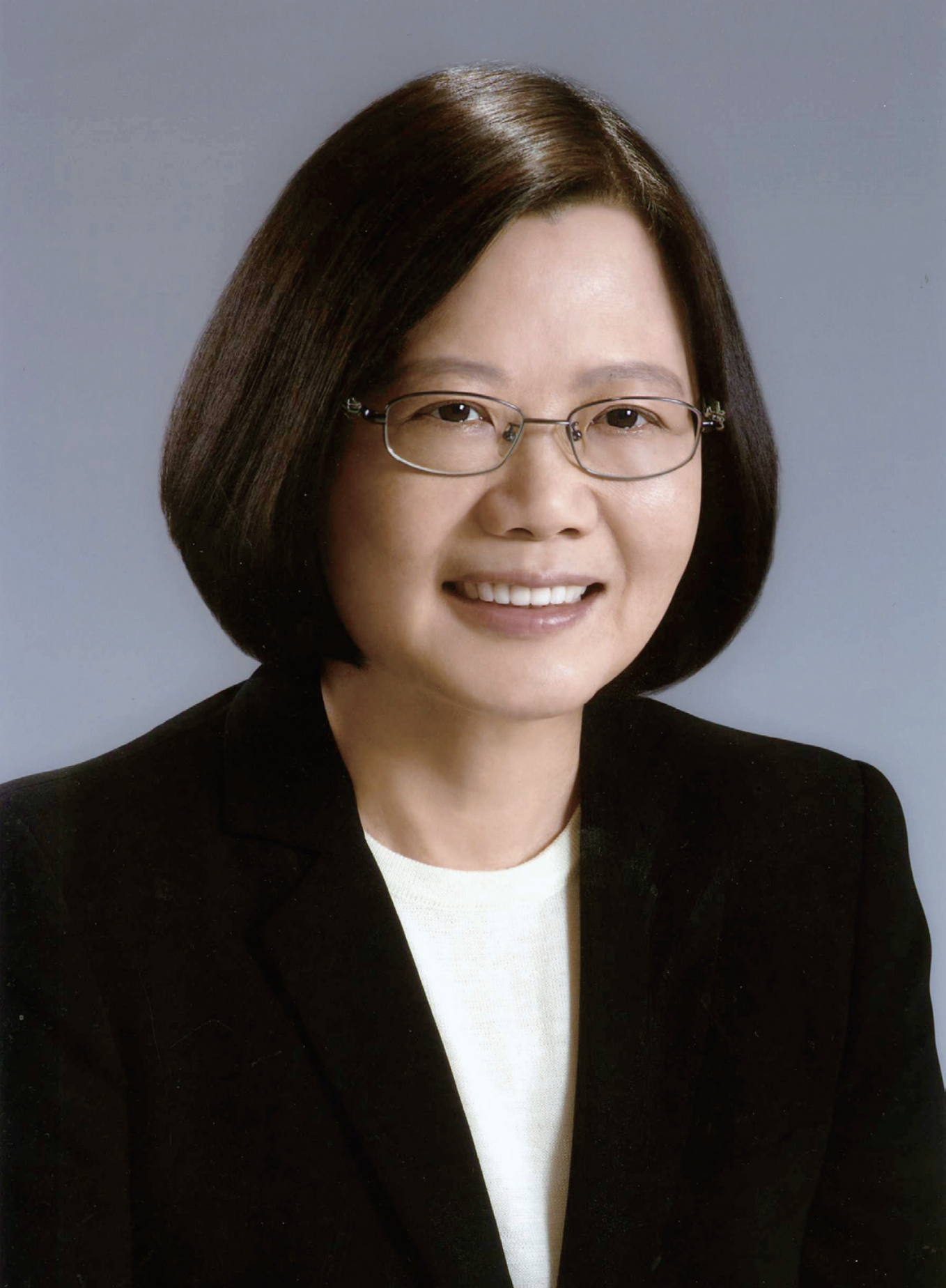

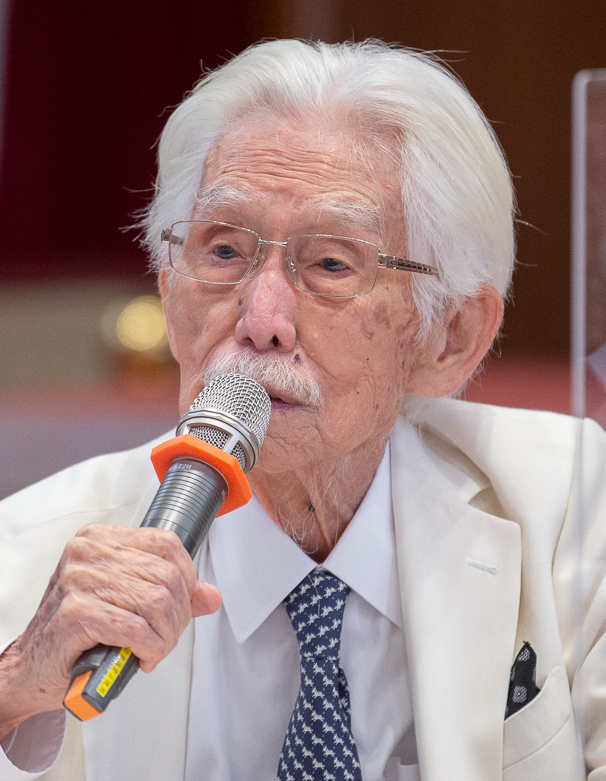

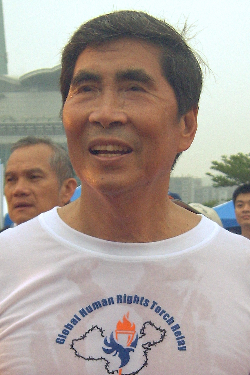
Candidate	Tsai Ing-wen	Koo Kwang-ming	Chai Trong-rong
Popular vote	73,865	48,882	6,530
Percentage	57.1%	37.8%	5.1%
- County-level units with Tsai Ing-wen leading. County-level units with Koo Kwang-ming leading. Area with no party office (Lienchiang County).
Chairman before election
Chen Shui-bian
Chairperson of DPP
Tsai Ing-wen

The 2008 Democratic Progressive Party chairmanship election took place on May 18, 2008. The election date was announced by chairperson Frank Hsieh after losing the presidential election.

== Candidates ==
Three members expressed their desire to run for the position:

=== Chai Trong-rong ===
Chai Trong-rong, first president of the World United Formosans for Independence and former legislator, announced his candidacy on April 14, 2008. He withdrew from the election on May 12 and endorsed candidate Koo Kwang-ming.

Endorsements
Name	Former faction	Political office	References
Hsu Tain-tsair	Justice Alliance	Mayor of Tainan	

=== Koo Kwang-ming ===
During Koo Kwang-ming's campaign, he made controversial remarks towards Tsai Ing-wen about the suitability of an unmarried woman leading. He then apologized to all women in Taiwan for those statements.

Endorsements
Name	Former faction	Political office	References
Chai Trong-rong	Welfare State Alliance	Member of the Legislative Yuan	
Chen Shih-meng		Secretary-General of the Presidential Office	
Shieh Jhy-wey	N/A	Minister of the Government Information Office	

=== Tsai Ing-wen ===
Tsai Ing-wen, former vice premier and former chairperson of the Mainland Affairs Council, won support from many local executives and decided to launch her campaign. She earned endorsements from Chiayi County magistrate Chen Ming-wen, Kaohsiung mayor Chen Chu, Tainan County magistrate Su Huan-chih, and Yunlin County magistrate Su Chih-fen.

Endorsements
Name	Former faction	Political office	References
Chen Chu	New Tide	Mayor of Kaohsiung	
Chen Ming-wen	Justice Alliance	Magistrate of Chiayi County	N/A
Su Huan-chih	Justice Alliance	Magistrate of Tainan County	

== Results ==
Candidate	Total votes cast	Percentage of vote	References
Tsai Ing-wen	73,865	57.1%	
Koo Kwang-ming	48,882	37.8%	
Chai Trong-rong	6,530	5.1%	
Voter turnout	51.1%		
