= 2016 Hong Kong legislative election in New Territories East =

- 4 September 2016

All 9 New Territories East seats to the Legislative Council
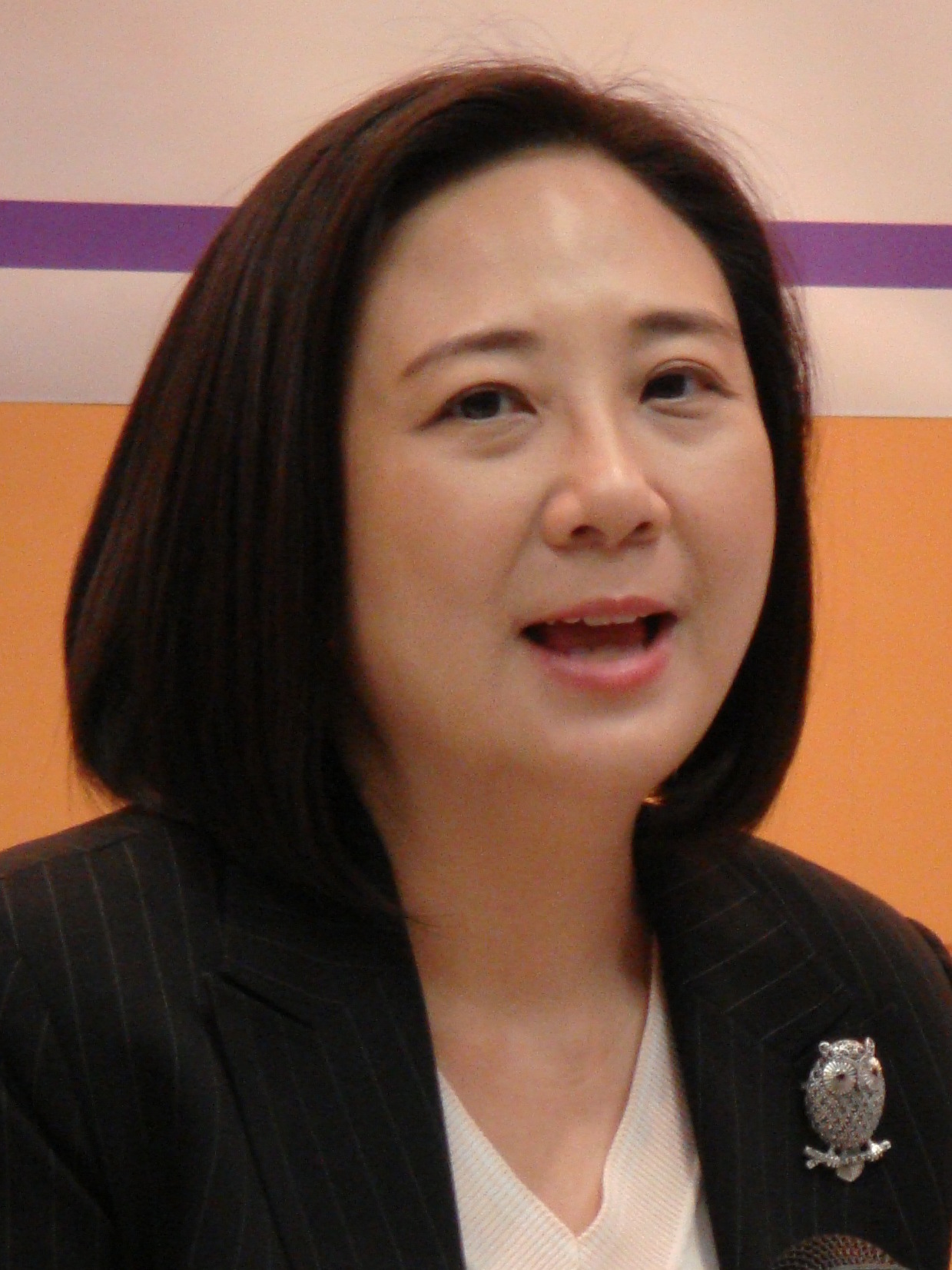

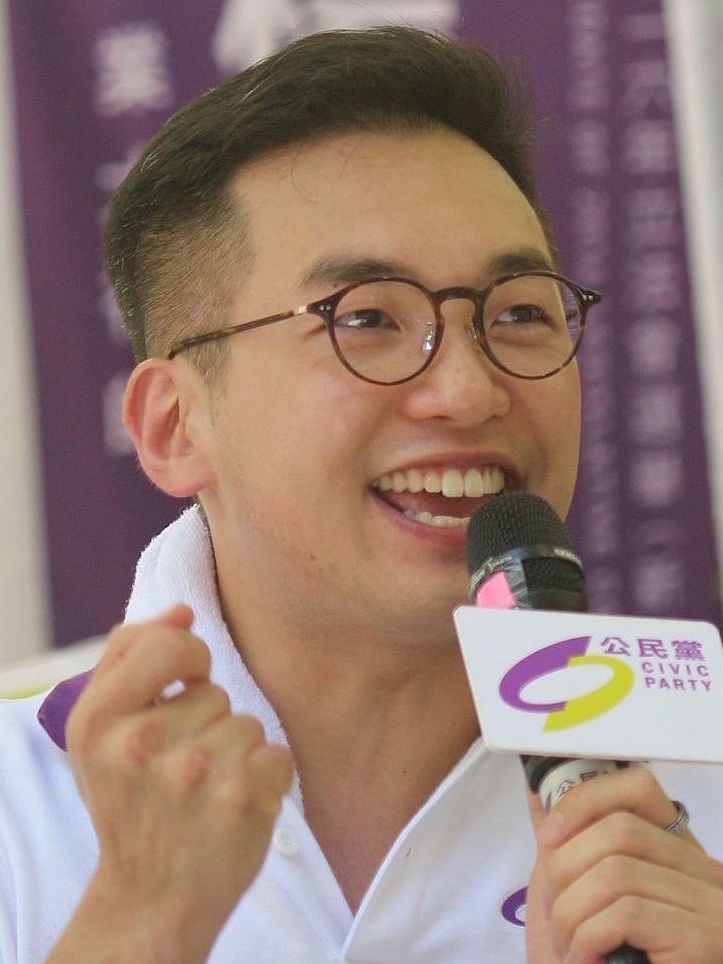

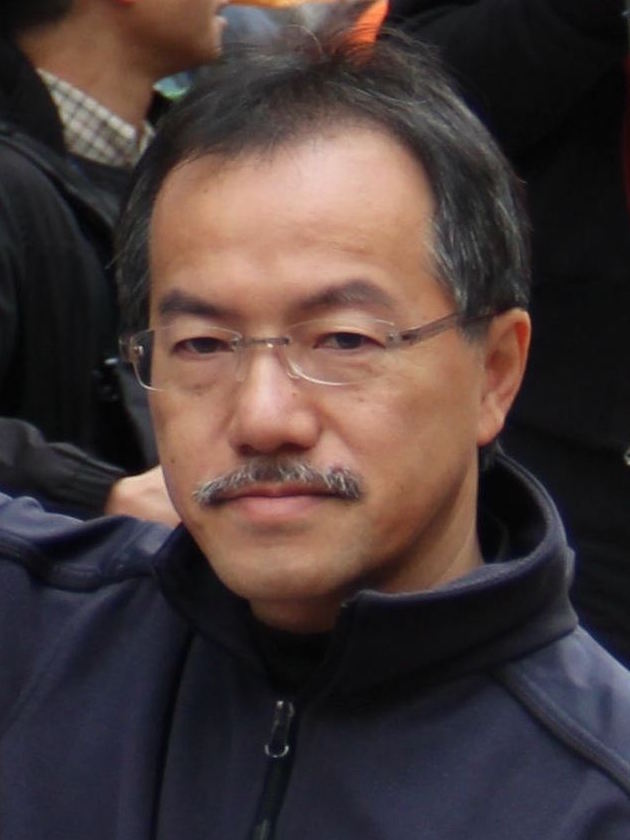

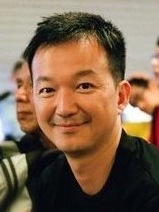

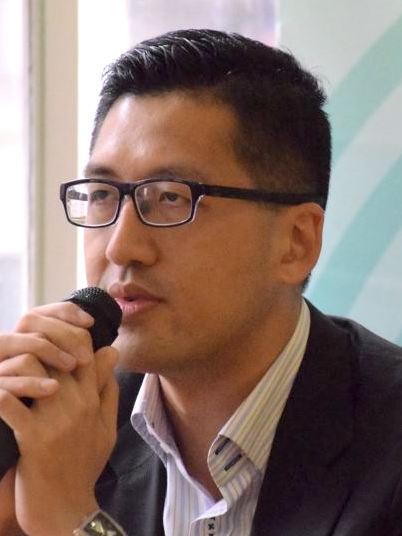

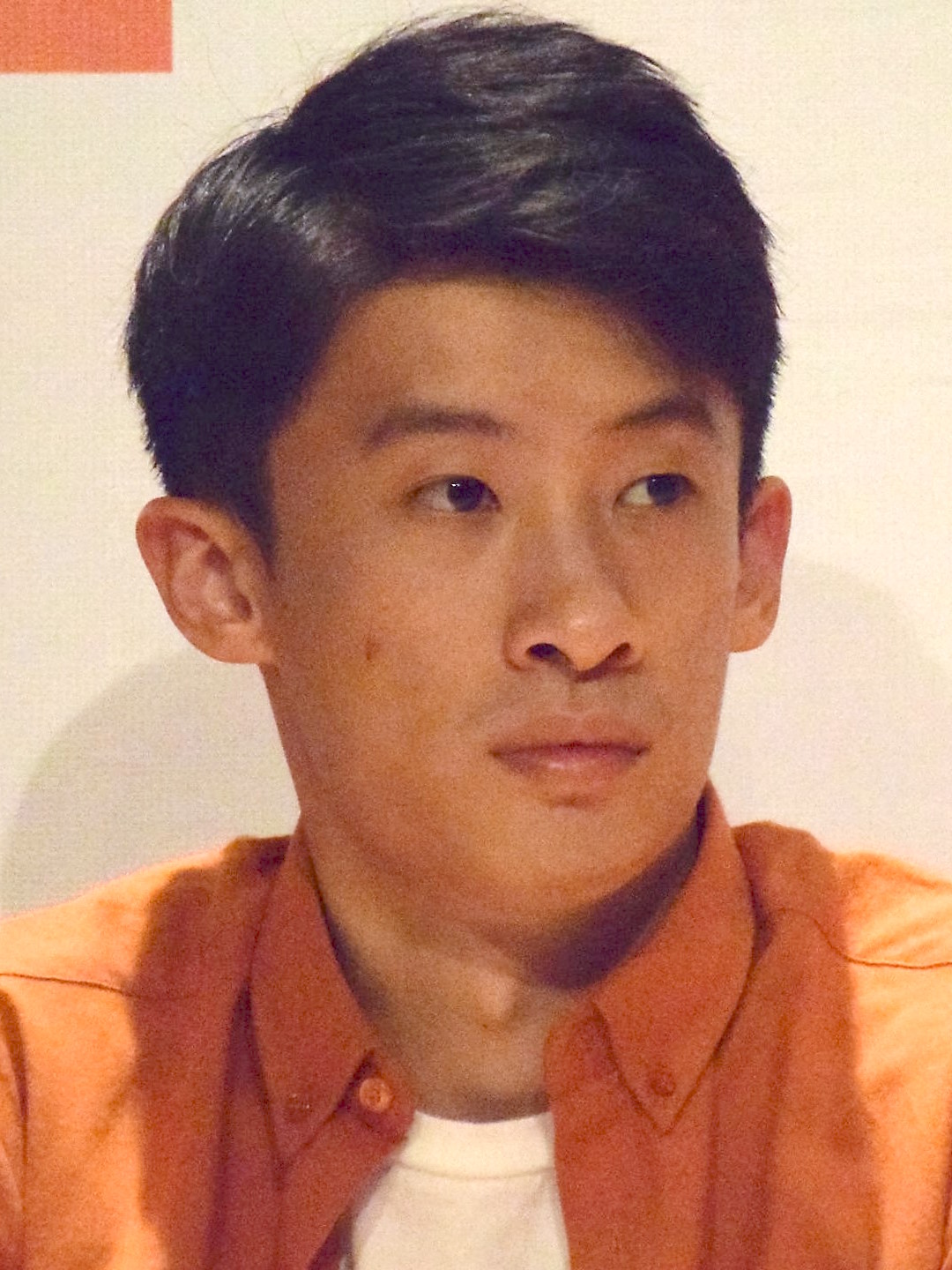

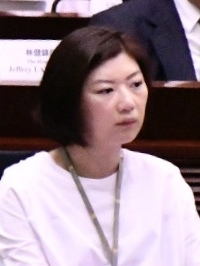

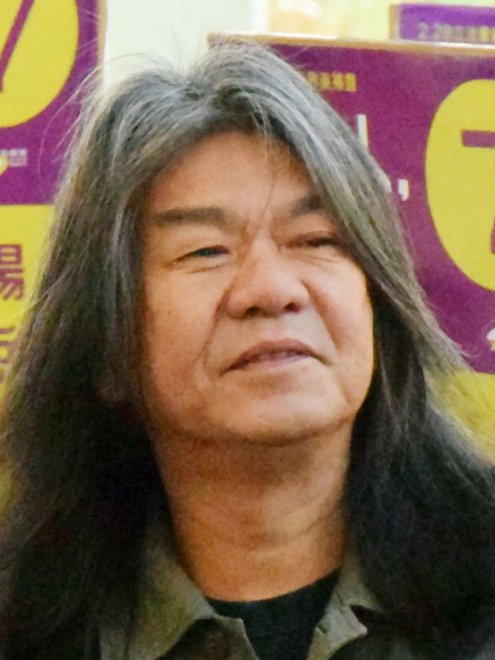

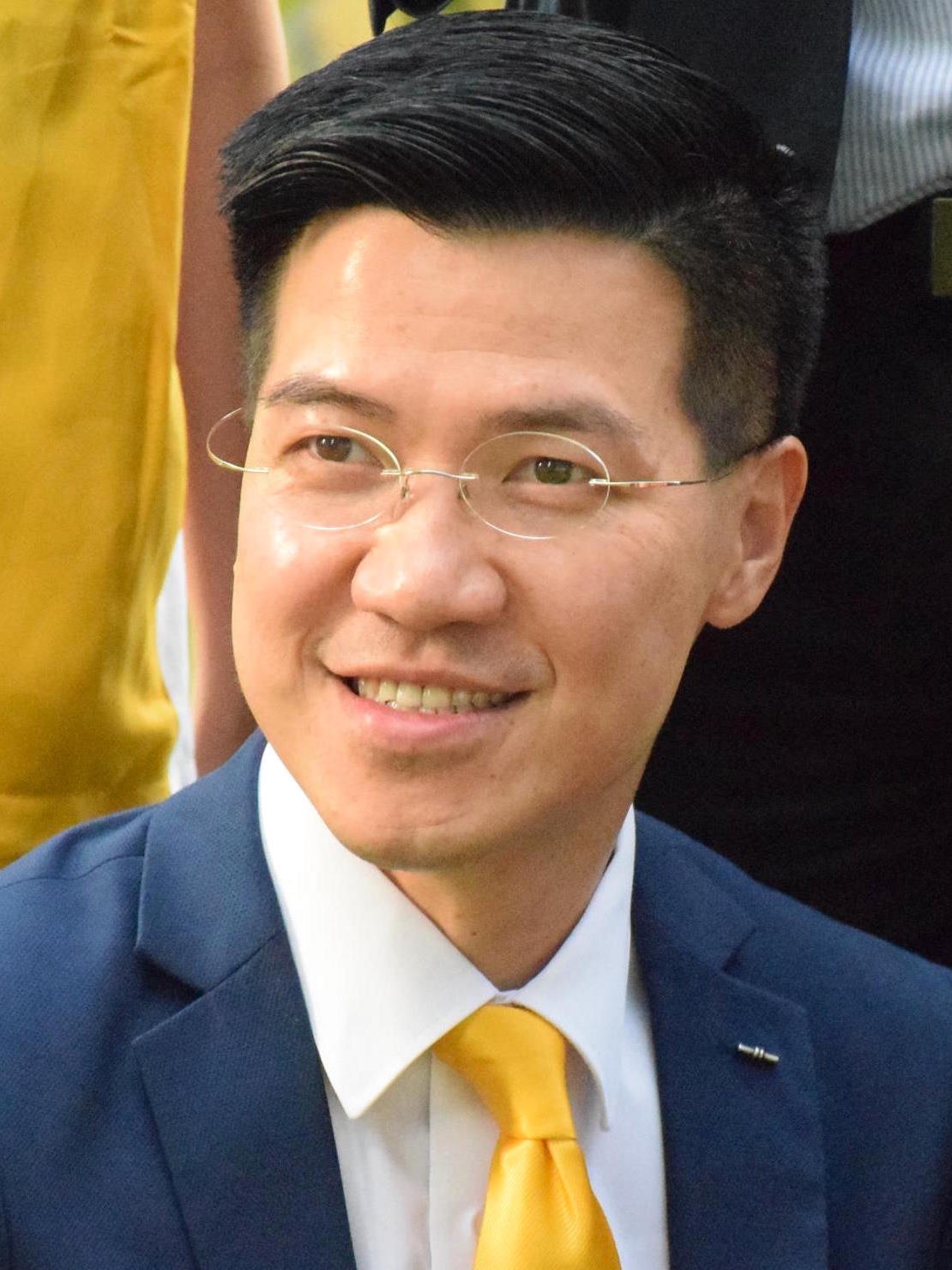
| | First party | Second party | Third party |
|---|---|---|---|
| Leader | Elizabeth Quat & Gary Chan | Alvin Yeung | Fernando Cheung |
| Party | DAB | Civic | Labour |
| Alliance | Pro-Beijing | Pan-democracy | Pan-democracy |
| Last election | 2 seats, 18.4% | 1 seat, 7.1% | 1 seat, 9.5% |
| Seats before | 2 | 1 | 1 |
| Seats won | 2 | 1 | 1 |
| Seat change | Steady | Steady | Steady |
| Popular vote | 107,545 | 52,416 | 49,800 |
| Percentage | 18.3% | 9.0% | 8.6% |
| Swing | ▲0.1% | ▲2.0% | ▲0.1% |
| | Fourth party | Fifth party | Sixth party |
| Leader | Ray Chan | Lam Cheuk-ting | Baggio Leung |
| Party | People Power | Democratic | Youngspiration |
| Alliance | Pan-democracy | Pan-democracy | ALLinHK |
| Last election | 1 seat, 8.2% | 1 seats, 14.7% | New party |
| Seats before | 1 | 1 | 0 |
| Seats won | 1 | 1 | 1 |
| Seat change | Steady | Steady | ▲1 |
| Popular vote | 45,993 | 39,327 | 37,997 |
| Percentage | 7.9% | 6.8% | 6.6% |
| Swing | ▼0.3% | ▼7.9% | N/A |
| | Seventh party | Eighth party | Ninth party |
| Leader | Eunice Yung | Leung Kwok-hung | Gary Fan |
| Party | NPP | LSD | Neo Democrats |
| Alliance | Pro-Beijing | Pan-democracy | Pan-democracy |
| Last election | 0 seat, 5.2% | 1 seat, 10.4% | 1 seat, 6.2% |
| Seats before | 0 | 1 | 1 |
| Seats won | 1 | 1 | 0 |
| Seat change | ▲1 | Steady | ▼1 |
| Popular vote | 31,016 | 35,595 | 31,595 |
| Percentage | 6.1% | 6.1% | 5.4% |
| Swing | ▲1.1% | ▼4.3% | ▼0.8% |
- Party with most votes in each District Council Constituency.

These are the New Territories East results of the 2016 Hong Kong Legislative Council election. The election was held on 4 September 2016 and all 9 seats in New Territories East where consisted of North District, Tai Po District, Sai Kung District and Sha Tin District were contested. The anti-establishment camp secured 6 of the 9 seats with Leung Kwok-hung narrowly defeated independent Christine Fong for the last seat by 1,051 votes. Neo Democrats' Gary Fan lost re-election while James Tien failed to get his young party colleague Dominic Lee elected. In return, localist group Youngspiration convenor Baggio Leung and New People's Party–Civil Force barrister Eunice Yung took a seat respectively.

== Overall results ==
Before election:

↓
| 6 | 3 |
| Anti-establishment | Pro-establishment |

Change in composition:

↓
| 6 | 3 |
| Anti-establishment | Pro-establishment |

| Party | Seats | Seats change | Contesting list(s) | Votes | % | % change |
|---|---|---|---|---|---|---|
| Civic | 1 | 0 | 1 | 52,416 | 9.0 | +2.0 |
| Labour | 1 | 0 | 1 | 49,800 | 8.6 | +0.1 |
| People Power | 1 | 0 | 1 | 45,993 | 7.9 | –0.3 |
| Democratic | 1 | 0 | 1 | 39,327 | 6.8 | −7.9 |
| LSD | 1 | 0 | 1 | 35,595 | 6.1 | −4.3 |
| Neo Democrats | 0 | –1 | 1 | 31,595 | 5.4 | –0.7 |
| Independent | 0 | 0 | 1 | 17,892 | 3.1 | N/A |
| Pro-democracy camp | 5 | –1 | 7 | 272,618 | 41.5 | –15.4 |
| DAB | 2 | 0 | 2 | 107,545 | 18.3 | +0.1 |
| NPP/CF | 1 | +1 | 1 | 36,183 | 6.2 | +1.1 |
| FTU | 0 | 0 | 1 | 26,931 | 4.6 | –0.6 |
| Liberal | 0 | –1 | 1 | 20,031 | 3.5 | −3.2 |
| Justice Alliance | 0 | 0 | 1 | 2,938 | 0.5 | N/A |
| Independent | 0 | 0 | 2 | 7,206 | 1.2 | N/A |
| Pro-Beijing camp | 3 | 0 | 8 | 200.834 | 34.6 | −7.8 |
| Youngspiration | 1 | +1 | 1 | 37,997 | 6.6 | N/A |
| HKRO/CP | 0 | 0 | 1 | 23,635 | 4.1 | N/A |
| Independent | 0 | 0 | 2 | 1,962 | 0.3 | N/A |
| Localist groups | 1 | +1 | 4 | 63,594 | 11.0 | |
| PoD | 0 | 0 | 1 | 8,084 | 1.4 | N/A |
| Independent | 0 | 0 | 2 | 35,394 | 6.1 | N/A |
| Turnout: | | | | 580,524 | 60.2 | +6.4 |

== Candidates list ==
Vote share
1. DAB (18.5%)
2. Civic (9.03%)
3. Labour (8.58%)
4. People Power (7.92%)
5. Democratic (6.77%)
6. Youngspiration (6.55%)
7. NPP/CF (6.23%)
8. LSD (6.13%)
9. Neo Democrats (5.44%)
10. FTU (4.64%)
11. HKRO/CP (4.07%)
12. Liberal (3.45%)
13. Path of Democracy (1.39%)
14. Other (11.3%)

Legislative Election 2016: New Territories East
| List | Candidates | Votes | Of total (%) | ± from prev. |
|---|---|---|---|---|
| DAB | Elizabeth Quat Chong Yuen-tung, Tung King-lei, Chan Pok-chi, Alvin Chiu Man-leong, Philip Li Ka-leung, Wan Kai-ming, Ada Lo Tai-suen, Alf Wong Chi-yung | 58,825 | 10.13 | +0.20 |
| Civic | Alvin Yeung Ngok-kiu | 52,416 | 9.03 | +1.98 |
| Labour | Cheung Chiu-hung Kwok Wing-kin | 49,800 | 8.58 | +0.03 |
| DAB (NTAS) | Chan Hak-kan Clement Woo Kin-man, Yiu Ming, Wong Pik-kiu, Larm Wai-leung, Tsang Hing-lung, Mui Siu-fung, Hau Hon-shek | 48,720 | 8.39 | –0.43 |
| People Power | Raymond Chan Chi-chuen | 45,993 | 7.92 | –0.27 |
| Democratic | Lam Cheuk-ting Emily Lau Wai-hing, Ting Tsz-yuen, Ng Kam-hung, Lo Ying-cheung | 39,327 | 6.77 | –7.90 |
| Youngspiration (Nonpartisan) | Sixtus Leung Chung-hang Li Tung-sing | 37,997 | 6.55 | N/A |
| NPP (Civil Force) | Yung Hoi-yan Stanley Lanny Tam, Leung Ka-fai, Chan Man-kuen, Tong Hok-leung, James Yip Chi-ho, Michael Liu Tsz-chung | 36,183 | 6.23 | +1.07 |
| LSD | Leung Kwok-hung | 35,595 | 6.13 | –4.26 |
| Independent | Christine Fong Kwok-shan | 34,544 | 5.95 | +0.66 |
| Neo Democrats | Gary Fan Kwok-wai, Yam Kai-bong, Leung Li, Chung Kam-lun, Chan Wai-tat, Li Sai-hung, Chow Yuen-wai, Lui Man-kwong | 31,595 | 5.44 | –0.72 |
| FTU | Tang Ka-piu, Tam Kam-lin, Kent Tsang King-chung | 26,931 | 4.64 | –0.62 |
| HKRO (Civic Passion) | Chin Wan-kan, Marco Lee Kwok-hei | 23,635 | 4.07 | N/A |
| Liberal | Dominic Lee Tsz-king, James Tien Pei-chun | 20,031 | 3.45 | –3.22 |
| Independent | Andrew Cheng Kar-foo | 17,892 | 3.08 | N/A |
| PoD | Raymond Mak Ka-chun | 8,084 | 1.39 | N/A |
| Nonpartisan | Hau Chi-keung, Wong Shui-sang, Pang Wang-kin, Yip Wah-ching | 6,720 | 1.16 | N/A |
| Justice Alliance | Leticia Lee See-yin | 2,938 | 0.51 | N/A |
| Independent | Wong Sum-yu | 1,657 | 0.29 | N/A |
| Nonpartisan | Liu Tin-shing, Kuen Ping-yiu, Li Wai | 850 | 0.15 | N/A |
| Nonpartisan | Estella Chan Yuk-ngor | 486 | 0.08 | N/A |
| Nonpartisan | Clarence Ronald Leung Kam-shing, Yau Man-king | 305 | 0.05 | N/A |
| Total valid votes | | 580,524 | 100.00 | |
| Rejected ballots | | 6,867 | | |
| Turnout | | 587,391 | 60.24 | +6.38 |
| Registered electors | | 975,071 | | |

== See also ==
- Legislative Council of Hong Kong
- Hong Kong legislative elections
- 2016 Hong Kong legislative election
