= Koo Kwang-ming =

Taiwanese independence activist, businessman, and politician (1926–2023)

- 辜寬敏
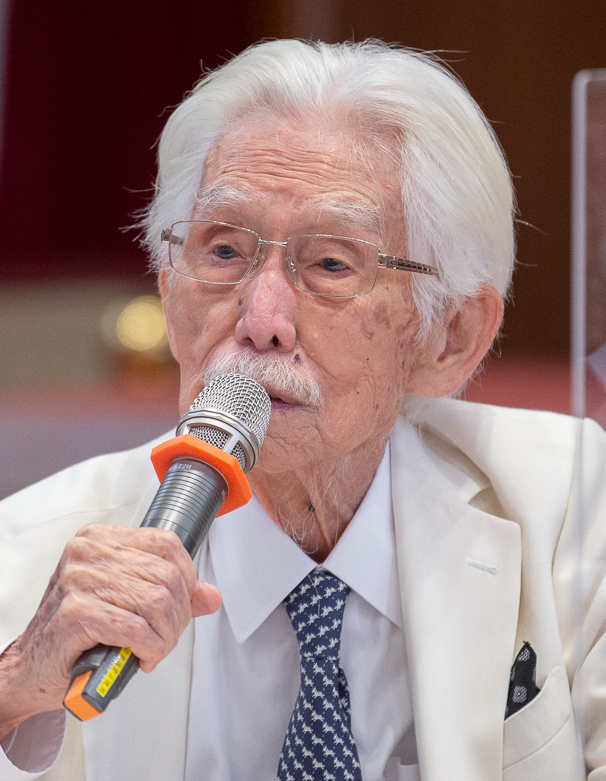
- Koo in 2022

Senior Advisor to the President
- In office 9 November 2016 – 27 February 2023
- President: Tsai Ing-wen
- In office 20 May 2000 – 20 May 2008
- President: Chen Shui-bian

Personal details
- Born: 15 October 1926 Rokkō Town, Shōka District, Taichu Prefecture, Japanese Taiwan (modern-day Lukang, Changhua, Taiwan)
- Died: 27 February 2023 (aged 96) Taipei Veterans General Hospital, Taipei, Taiwan
- Education: National Taiwan University (BA)

Koo Kwang-ming (Chinese: 辜寬敏; pinyin: Gū Kuānmǐn; Pe̍h-ōe-jī: Ko͘ Khoan-bín; 15 October 1926 – 27 February 2023) was a Taiwanese businessman and independence activist.

== Personal life ==
Koo was the eighth son of Koo Hsien-jung, a prominent Lukang businessman who had relocated to Taipei at the time of the Treaty of Shimonoseki, when Taiwan was ceded by the Qing Dynasty to the Empire of Japan. Hsien-jung grew wealthy during the period of Japanese rule. Kwang-ming's older brother Koo Chen-fu became a confidant of Chiang Kai-shek. Kwang-ming, however, went into exile in Japan after the 228 massacre, where he lived for decades as an advocate for Taiwanese independence. His son born in Kobe, Richard Koo, is a prominent economist in Japan.

Koo was married twice and had three children. Koo died at Taipei Veterans General Hospital on 27 February 2023. A memorial was held in early March 2023 at the Taiwan New Constitution Foundation offices in Taipei.

== Political career ==
Koo enrolled at what is now National Taiwan University in 1944 to study political science. He became the chair of the school's student association. He left Taiwan for Hong Kong soon after the 228 incident, and later settled in Japan. In 1972, Koo traveled in secret from Japan via Thailand to Taiwan. He met Chiang Ching-kuo, son of ruler Chiang Kai-shek, to argue for the lifting of martial law. As a consequence, he was expelled from the Japanese chapter of WUFI. The younger Chiang invited Koo to end his exile and "share in the affairs of the country". Koo accepted, but upon landing in Taiwan, was upset to see his return described as "surrender" in an evening newspaper. He replied that he "had not returned to surrender, but to bring my influence to bear [on the situation]". Influential independence activist Su Beng contradicted this assertion, accusing Koo of "surrendering to the Chiang government". Koo joined the Democratic Progressive Party in 1996, when fellow independence activist Peng Ming-min received its presidential nomination. Koo later served President Chen Shui-bian as an adviser, resigning his post and DPP membership in 2005.

=== 2008 DPP leadership bid ===
After the DPP's comprehensive defeat in the 2008 Democratic Progressive Party chairmanship election, a leadership election was held to find the new party chairperson. Koo, then 82 years old, stood as a candidate. The campaign was notable for controversial remarks made by Koo about the suitability of an unmarried woman to lead, widely interpreted as an attack on the eventual winner, Tsai Ing-wen, who became the first elected female head of the party.

Candidate	Total votes cast	Percentage of vote	References
Tsai Ing-wen	73,865	57.1%	
Koo Kwang-ming	48,882	37.8%	
Chai Trong-rong	6,530	5.1%	
Voter turnout	51.1%		

Koo was appointed adviser to Tsai Ing-wen in November 2016, four months after she had taken office as President of the Republic of China.

== Philanthropy ==
In 2014 Koo announced that he would be giving away half of his fortune, NT$3 billion, through his New Taiwan Peace Foundation. This included prizes such as an award for Taiwanese historical fiction.

== Political stances ==
After Panama ended bilateral relations with Taiwan in June 2017, Koo and Yu Shyi-kun announced that the Tsai Ing-wen administration should renounce the Republic of China and seek international recognition as Taiwan.

== Bibliography ==
- Su Beng (1980), 台灣人四百年史 (Taiwan's 400 Years of History) (in Chinese)
