= Lawrence Lau (barrister) =

Hong Kong barrister (born 1968)

- 劉偉聰
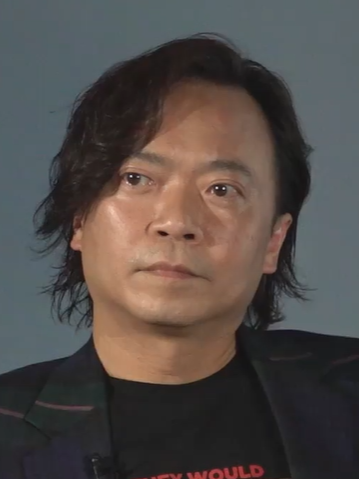
- Lau in 2020

Sham Shui Po District Councillor
- In office 1 January 2020 – 29 September 2021
- Preceded by: Dominic Lee
- Constituency: Yau Yat Tsuen

Personal details
- Born: 4 January 1968 (age 58) Hong Kong
- Education: University of Hong Kong (LLB)
- Occupation: Barrister
- Known for: Hong Kong 47
- Website: Lawrence Lau on Facebook; Lawrence Lau's channel on YouTube

Lawrence Lau Wai-chung (Chinese: 劉偉聰; born 4 January 1968) is a Hong Kong barrister and former politician. Having served as a police inspector, deputy magistrate, and Sham Shui Po district councillor, Lau was arrested in 2020 for joining pro-democracy primaries as one of the Hong Kong 47.

== Early life ==
Lau was born into a grassroots family of a bus driver and a housewife, and attended Lok Sin Tong Ku Chiu Man Secondary School. Lau went on to study law at the University of Hong Kong and led the university's debate team, graduating in 1993 with a third-class honours Bachelor of Laws degree. Lau received an offer to join the Civil Service as an Administrative Officer, but failed to meet the condition of attaining an lower second-class honours degree. After a short stint as a probationary inspector in the Royal Hong Kong Police Force, he worked as a speechwriter for Allen Lee, the founding chairman of the Liberal Party, until the late 1990s. Lau was called to the Bar in 1995.

In 2000 Lau went to the London School of Economics to study political philosophy but was unable to receive a doctorate after disputes with his doctoral advisor, subsequently returning to Hong Kong in 2005. Five years later he was appointed Deputy Special Magistrate and Deputy Magistrate at the District Court. After serving in court, Lau took up multiple notable cases, including in defence for a woman assaulting a police officer with her breast, and for Mong Kok unrest protestors, including Lo Kin-man who received the harshest sentencing.

== Political career ==
With limited participation in street protests, Lau stood in the 2019 local elections in his home constituency of Yau Yat Tsuen amidst the large-scale protests, defeating pro-business incumbent Dominic Lee with a margin of 2%. Believing that not much could be done in the District Council and wishing to work in the Legislative Council to amend legislation suppressing human rights, Lau announced his intention to stand in the 2020 legislative election for the Kowloon West constituency. He ran in the pro-democracy primaries in the same year but was defeated.

In January 2021, Lau was arrested by national security police for subversion over his participation in the primaries. He was charged in late February along with others known as Hong Kong 47. After being remanded for around two weeks, he was released on court bail. Lau pleaded not guilty to the charge, and defended himself in court. On 30 May 2024, Lau was one of two defendants who were acquitted, the other being Lee Yue-shun, after the Court of First Instance found that he had not mentioned an intention to veto the budget or subvert state power. The Department of Justice has appealed the acquittal.

While being tried for subversion, Lau continued representing Tong Ying-kit in Hong Kong's first national security trial in 2021. Lau was later removed from Tong's defence team responsible for his appeal, after criticism from pro-Beijing media.

In September 2021, Lau was unseated from the Sham Shui Po District Council after his oath of loyalty pledging allegiance to the Hong Kong Government was ruled invalid by the authorities.
