= Dominic Lee =

Hong Kong politician (born 1984)

The Honourable Dominic Lee
- 李梓敬
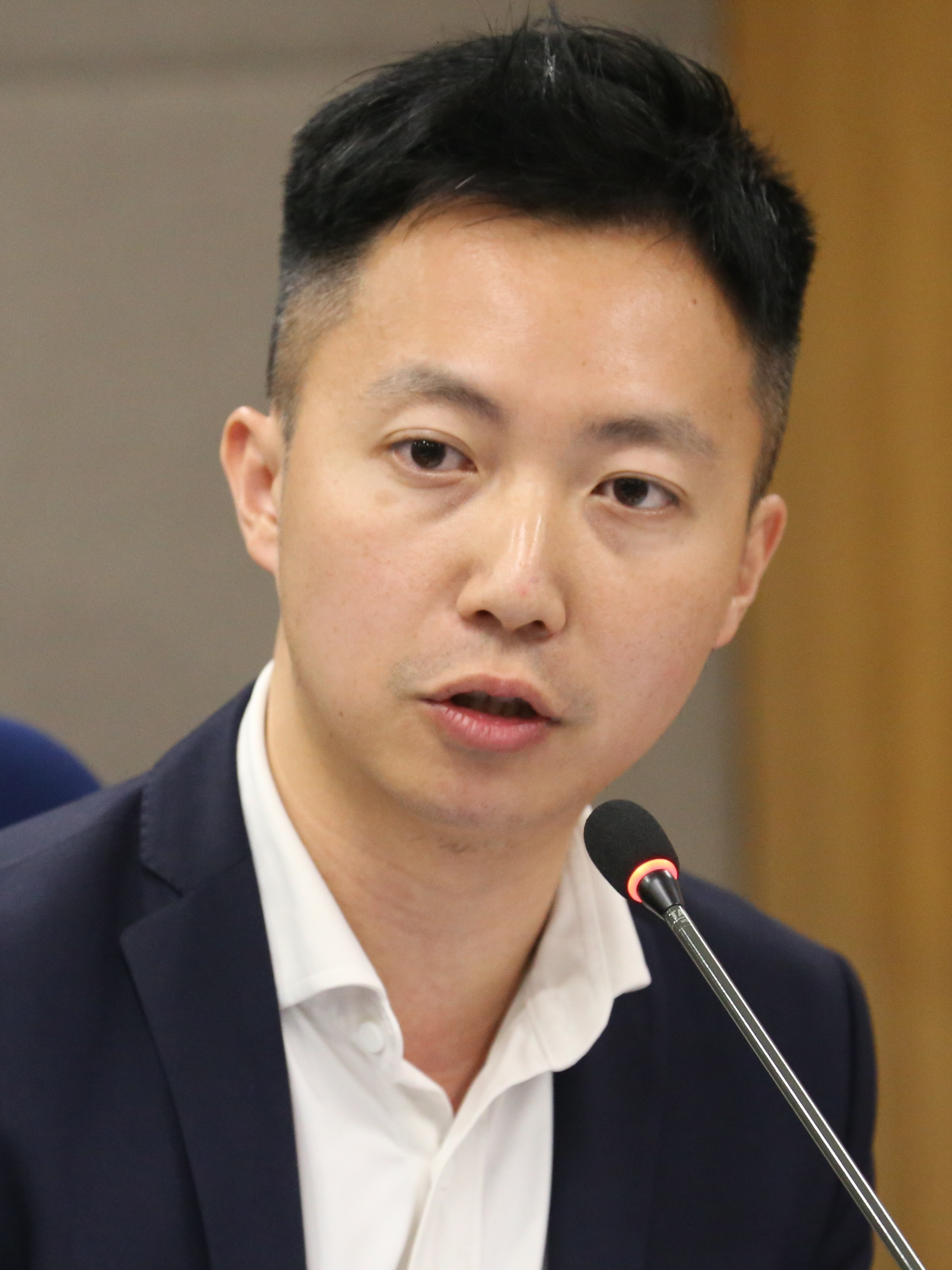
- Lee in 2018

Member of the Legislative Council
- Incumbent
- Assumed office 1 January 2022
- Preceded by: New constituency
- Constituency: New Territories North East

Member of the Sham Shui Po District Council
- In office 1 January 2016 – 31 December 2019
- Preceded by: Jimmy Kwok
- Succeeded by: Lau Wai-chung
- Constituency: Yau Yat Tsuen

Personal details
- Born: 22 January 1984 (age 42) Hong Kong
- Party: New People's Party (2020–present); Civil Force (2020–present); Liberal Party (2009–2020)
- Education: Rice University (BS); City University of Hong Kong (JD)
- Occupation: Company director
- Website: https://www.leedominic.com/

Dominic Lee Tsz-king (Chinese: 李梓敬; born 22 January 1984) is a Hong Kong politician. He is a member of the New People's Party and a Legislative Council Member representing the New Territories North East. He is a former member of the Sham Shui Po District Council for Yau Yat Tsuen from 2015 to 2019 and the former chairman of the Liberal Party Youth Committee.

== Early life and career ==
Dominic Lee Tsz-king was born in Hong Kong on 22 January 1984 to an upper-middle-class family. He studied at Diocesan Boys' School and the Li Po Chun United World College of Hong Kong before going abroad and graduated from Rice University in 2006 with a degree in economics. He worked as an assistant in his campus polling station for Democratic Party US presidential candidate John Kerry in 2004 and later worked as an intern for Democrat Al Green in the US House of Representatives.

== Political career ==
=== Liberal Party ===
Lee joined the pro-business conservative Liberal Party in 2009 after he returned to Hong Kong. During the 2004 Hong Kong legislative election, he helped Liberal Party chairman James Tien to win a seat representing New Territories East. Lee became the first chairman of the party's youth committee when it was established in 2011.

In the 2011 District Council elections, Lee ran in Shek Lei Extension but was defeated by Democratic Party incumbent Leung Kwok-wah. In the 2015 District Council elections, Lee ran in the Yau Yat Tsuen constituency and won against League of Social Democrats candidate Dickson Chau Ka-faat, succeeding council chairman Jimmy Kwok Chun-wah as member of the Sham Shui Po District Council.

In 2016, Lee was nominated by the Liberal Party to run in the 2016 Hong Kong legislative election in New Territories East with the support of incumbent legislator and party honorary chairman James Tien. However, the Liberal party ticket narrowly missed out on winning the seat. In the 2019 District Council elections, Lee narrowly lost his District Council seat in Yau Yat Tsuen to independent barrister Lau Wai-chung by 96 votes.

==== Opposition to universal retirement protection ====
Lee is known for his strong words in opposition to universal retirement protection. In 2014, he was criticized by an elderly woman over the topic during a legislative council public hearing, which went viral on the Internet.

==== Immigration and refugees ====
In 2015, Lee supported the government's plan to scrap visa-free facility for Indians, defending the move as a "sacrifice to protect our borders". In 2016, he led the Alliance Demanding Repatriation of Refugees against "fake" refugees from Southeast Asia coming into Hong Kong. Moreover, he demanded quitting the United Nations Convention against Torture to block "fake" refugees from coming to Hong Kong. In May that year, he led an anti-refugee protest which drew 100 to 200 people as well as counter-protesters. Claiming that there was a refugee-led crime surge in Hong Kong and that South Asians should be locked up in internment camps, Access to Information requests from Justice Centre Hong Kong have debunked these fears as not being based upon any measurable increase in crime.

==== Ladies' night ====
In April 2016, Lee led a protest in Lan Kwai Fong against the Equal Opportunities Commission's ruling of "ladies' night" being discriminatory. Lee supported bar and nightclub operators in favor of resuming ladies' night to avoid potential losses of revenue.

==== Same-sex marriage ====
In 2018, Lee claimed that civil unions and gay marriage will “encourage” people to adopt LGBTQ lifestyles in response to Hong Kong Court of Final Appeal's ruling which stated that spousal visas may be granted to same-sex couples in civil unions.

=== New People's Party and Civil Force ===
While an active member of the Liberal Party, Lee ran for the 2020 primary of the New People's Party for the Legislative Council election in the New Territories East constituency. As a result, his membership with the Liberal Party was revoked by party leader Felix Chung. Later that night, Lee announced his resignation as the member of Liberal Party and joined New People's Party and Civil Force, a district-based political coalition that was established in 2014 by Chairperson of the New People's Party, Regina Ip Lau Suk-yee.

In the 2021 Hong Kong legislative election, Lee was elected to the Legislative Council representing New Territories North East (2021 constituency) with 45.35 percent of the vote. Lee is one among five members of the New People's Party to be elected to the Legislative Council and will serve a four-year term.

==== Xinjiang ====
In March 2021, after some companies boycotted purchasing cotton from Xinjiang due to suspected human rights violations, Lee said that some leaders of Western countries and Western media had falsely understood the situation in Xinjiang and have leveled allegations without evidence.

==== Name recognition ====
In April 2023, a survey of more than 1000 Hongkongers showed that only 4% of respondents recognized Lee as a lawmaker.

==== Criticism of Carrie Lam ====
In April 2024, Lee criticized former Chief Executive Carrie Lam's office space, saying "Why does a former chief executive need to rent such space?"

==== United Nations Human Rights Council speech ====
Lee defended the election of Hong Kong's newly reformed Election Committee as a massive success on 23 September 2021 during the 48th UNHRC Side Meeting, stating that the idea that one's government should only be led by patriots is not only unique to Hong Kong but is also a universal value among western countries. Lee called US politicians on "double standards" for only allowing patriots to be elected in office while criticising Hong Kong's "patriots-only" election as an act of "restricting democratic freedoms" and an "assault on democratic institutions".

Lee attacked the United States and Israel over the Gaza war, upheld the 2020 Hong Kong national security law, and morally challenged the United Kingdom and NATO in a speech to the 61st session of the United Nations Human Rights Council on 18 March 2026, which became a viral video with more than 200K views on China Xinhua News. Lee was praised on social media for speaking against war, according to an article from Hong Kong Free Press. Lee claimed the UK "arrested over 12,000 of its own people for posting online" and that tourism in Hong Kong has "flourished" since the implementing of the security law.

== Political positions ==
Part of the pro-Beijing camp, Lee is vocal about his conservative stances on the economy, immigration, and social issues.

Party political offices
New creation	Chairman of Liberal Party Youth Committee; 2011–2020	Succeeded by Howard Chao
Political offices
Preceded by Jimmy Kwok	Member of Sham Shui Po District Council; Representative for Yau Yat Tsuen; 2012–2019	Succeeded by Lau Wai-chung
Legislative Council of Hong Kong
New constituency	Member of Legislative Council; Representative for New Territories North East; 2022–present	Incumbent
