= Department of China Affairs of the Democratic Progressive Party =

Body within a Taiwanese political party

- 民主進步黨中國事務部
- Formation: November 21, 2012; 13 years ago
- Director: Wu Junzhi
- Parent organization: Central Executive Committee of the Democratic People's Party

The Department of China Affairs of the Democratic Progressive Party is an agency of the Democratic Progressive Party (DPP) that handles matters related to mainland China. On 21 November 2012, the DPP China Affairs Committee was established; the first chairman was concurrently held by the party chairman Su Tseng-chang.

== History ==
In November 2012, Chuang Jui-hsiung, a protégé of Frank Hsieh, said that after Hsieh's visit to mainland China that year, "confidently and bravely facing cross-strait issues" became a consensus within the Democratic Progressive Party (DPP), and this became a catalyst for the establishment of the China Affairs Committee. On 30 December 2013, Ker Chien-ming, the convener of the Democratic Progressive Party caucus in the Legislative Yuan, said that when the China Affairs Committee held its first meeting, Chiou I-jen, the former Secretary-General of the Presidential Office who was sitting next to him, asked clearly at the outset, " Should the Taiwan independence party platform be dealt with?" As a result, everyone looked at each other, but no one dared to respond.

On 9 January 2014, the China Affairs Committee released the "Minutes of the 2014 Review of China Policy by the China Affairs Committee and the Expanded Meeting on China Policy", stating: "We are Taiwanese. Taiwan is a sovereign and independent country. Its official name is the Republic of China. It is not subordinate to the People's Republic of China. The future of Taiwan should be decided by the 23 million people of Taiwan themselves. This is the greatest consensus of the people of Taiwan at this stage.... Cherishing and defending Taiwan's free, democratic, and open way of life is already the greatest consensus in Taiwan." The Department of China Affairs was restarted on 21 January 2015.

== Function ==
The China Affairs Committee is mainly responsible for collecting and analyzing materials to provide the DPP with advice and opinions on handling relations with mainland China.

== Composition ==
The committee members and advisory committee members came from different factions.
