= Democratic Progressive Party =

Taiwanese political party

Democratic Progressive Party 民主進步黨
- Abbreviation: DPP
- Chairperson: Lai Ching-te
- Secretary-General: Hsu Kuo-yung
- Founded: 28 September 1986; 40 years ago
- Preceded by: Tangwai
- Headquarters: 10F-30, Beiping East Rd. Zhongzheng District, Taipei; 10049
- Think tank: New Frontier Foundation
- Membership (2023): ▼238,664
- Ideology: Social liberalism; Progressivism (Taiwanese); Taiwanese nationalism (Note: Though Taiwan independence is written in the DPP platform, main DPP politicians support a Republic of China independence position.); Anti-communism; Anti-imperialism
- Political position: See below
- National affiliation: Pan-Green Coalition
- Regional affiliation: Council of Asian Liberals and Democrats
- International affiliation: Liberal International
- Colors: Green
- Legislative Yuan: 51 / 113
- Municipal mayors: 2 / 6
- Magistrates/mayors: 3 / 16
- Councilors: 277 / 910
- Township/city mayors: 40 / 204

Party flag

Website
- www.dpp.org.tw

Democratic Progressive Party
- Traditional Chinese: 民主進步黨
- Simplified Chinese: 民主进步党
Transcriptions
Standard Mandarin
- Hanyu Pinyin: Mínzhǔ Jìnbù Dǎng
- Bopomofo: ㄇㄧㄣˊ ㄓㄨˇ ㄐㄧㄣˋ ㄅㄨˋ ㄉㄤˇ
- Gwoyeu Romatzyh: Minjuu Jinnbuh Daang
- Wade–Giles: Min^{2}-chu^{3} Chin^{4}-pu^{4} Tang^{3}
- Tongyong Pinyin: Mín-jhǔ Jìn-bù Dǎng
- MPS2: Mínjǔ Jìnbù Dǎng
- IPA: [mǐn.ʈʂù tɕîn.pû tàŋ]
Wu
- Wugniu: min^{2} tsy^{3} tsin^{5} bu^{6} taon^{3}
- IPA: Shanghainese: [min˨ tsɿ˦ tɕin˧ bu˦ tɑ̃˨]
Hakka
- Romanization: Mìn-chú Chin-phu Tóng
Yue: Cantonese
- Yale Romanization: màhn jyú jeun bouh dóng
- Jyutping: man^{4} zyu^{2} zeon^{3} bou^{6} dong^{2}
- IPA: [mɐn˩.tsy˧˥ tsɵn˩˧.pɔw˨ tɔŋ˧˥]
Southern Min
- Hokkien POJ: Bîn-chú Chìn-pō͘ Tóng
- Tâi-lô: Bîn-tsú Tsìn-pōo Tóng

DPP
- Traditional Chinese: 民進黨
- Simplified Chinese: 民进党
Transcriptions
Standard Mandarin
- Hanyu Pinyin: Mínjìn Dǎng
- Bopomofo: ㄇㄧㄣˊ ㄐㄧㄣˋ ㄉㄤˇ
- Gwoyeu Romatzyh: Minjinn Daang
- Wade–Giles: Min^{2}-chin^{4} Tang^{3}
- Tongyong Pinyin: Mín-jìn Dǎng
- MPS2: Mínjìn Dǎng
- IPA: [mǐn.tɕîn tàŋ]
Wu
- Wugniu: min^{2} tsin^{5} taon^{3}
- IPA: Shanghainese: [min˨ tɕin˧ tɑ̃˨]
Hakka
- Romanization: Mìn-chin Tóng
Yue: Cantonese
- Yale Romanization: màhn jeun dóng
- Jyutping: man^{4} zeon^{3} dong^{2}
- IPA: [mɐn˩.tsɵn˩˧ tɔŋ˧˥]
Southern Min
- Hokkien POJ: Bîn-chìn Tóng
- Tâi-lô: Bîn-tsìn Tóng

The Democratic Progressive Party (Note: In local languages: Traditional Chinese script: 民主進步黨; Mandarin Pinyin: Mínzhǔ Jìnbù Dǎng; Hokkien: Bîn-tsú Tsìn-pōo Tóng; Sixian Hakka: Mìn-chú Chin-phu Tóng) (DPP) (Note: In local languages: Traditional Chinese script: 民進黨; Mandarin Pinyin: Mínjìndǎng; Hokkien: Bîn-chìn Tóng; Sixian Hakka: Mìn-chin Tóng) is a Taiwanese nationalist political party in Taiwan. As the dominant party in the Pan-Green Coalition, one of the two main political camps in Taiwan, the DPP is currently the ruling party in Taiwan, leading a minority government that controls the presidency and the central government.

Founded in 1986 by Hsu Hsin-liang, Roger Hsieh and Lin Shui-chuan, a year prior to the end of martial law, the DPP is one of two major parties in Taiwan, the other being the Kuomintang (KMT), a Chinese nationalist party previously ruling the country as a one-party state, and its smaller allies in the Pan-Blue Coalition. It has traditionally been associated with a strong advocacy of human rights, emerging against the authoritarian White Terror that was initiated by the KMT, as well as the promotion of Taiwanese nationalism and identity. Lai Ching-te has been chairperson of the DPP since 2023; he also serves as the incumbent President and is the third member of the DPP to hold the presidency; he succeeded fellow DPP member Tsai Ing-wen in May 2024.

The DPP is a longtime member of Liberal International and a founding member of the Council of Asian Liberals and Democrats. It represented Taiwan in the Unrepresented Nations and Peoples Organization (UNPO). The DPP is widely classified as socially liberal, having been founded as a party for human rights, including factions within the party supporting same-sex marriage and other LGBT rights. On foreign policy, the DPP is more willing to increase military expenditures to prevent military intimidation from the People's Republic of China (PRC) owing to the ambiguous political status of Taiwan. It favors closer ties with democratic nations such as Japan and the United States, as well as the nations of ASEAN as part of its New Southbound Policy.

In its policy on cross-strait relations, the DPP as a ruling party chooses to keep the status quo of Taiwan, instead of approaching de jure independence, despite being a pro-independence group in its party platform. The party considers that Taiwan is already a sovereign country under the name "Republic of China" and not subordinate to the PRC. The DPP is frequently accused by the PRC government of being a primary force in Taiwan to "prevent the Chinese nation from achieving complete reunification" and "halt the process of national rejuvenation" due to the party's advocacy of Taiwanese nationalism, Taiwanese self-determination, and its firm opposition to "One China", including the alleged "1992 Consensus" narratives by both the PRC and the KMT.

== History ==
The DPP's roots were in the Tangwai movement, which formed in opposition to the Kuomintang's one-party authoritarian rule under the "party-state" system during martial law. This movement culminated in the formation of the DPP as an alternative, but still illegal, party on 28 September 1986 by eighteen organizing members at Grand Hotel Taipei, with a total of 132 people joining the party in attendance. The new party members contested the 1986 election as "nonpartisan" candidates since competing parties would remain illegal until the following year. These early members of the party, like the tangwai, drew heavily from the ranks of family members and defense lawyers of political prisoners, as well as intellectuals and artists who had spent time abroad. These individuals were strongly committed to political change toward democracy and freedom of speech, press, assembly, and association.

The tangwai were not a unified political unit and consisted of factions which carried over into the early DPP. At its founding the DPP consisted of three factions: the Kang group, a moderate faction led by Kang Ning-hsiang, New Tide faction, consisting of intellectuals and social activists led by Wu Nai-ren and Chiou I-jen, and the Progress Faction led by Lin Cheng-chieh, a waishengren opposed to independence. Moderates would later coalesce around the Formosa faction, founded by those arrested during the Formosa Incident after their release from prison. In the early days of the party, the Formosa faction focused on winning elections by wielding the star power of its leaders, while New Tide would focus on ideological mobilization and developing grassroots support for social movements. As a result, the Formosa faction would become more moderate, often bending to public opinion, while New Tide would become more ideologically cohesive. By 1988 the Formosa Faction would dominate high-level positions within the party.

The party did not at the outset give explicit support to an independent Taiwanese national identity, partially because moderates such as Hsu Hsin-liang were concerned that such a move that could have invited a violent crackdown by the Kuomintang and alienate voters, but also because some members such as Lin Cheng-chieh supported unification. Partially due to their waning influence within the party and partially due to their ideological commitment, between 1988 and 1991 the New Tide Faction would push the independence issue, bolstered by the return of pro-independence activists from overseas who were previously barred from Taiwan. In 1991, in order to head off the New Tide, party chairman Hsu Hsin-liang of the moderate Formosa faction agreed to include language in the party charter which advocated for the drafting of a new constitution as well as declaration of a new Republic of Taiwan via referendum (which resulted in many pro-unification members leaving the party). However, the party would quickly begin to walk back on this language, and eventually in 1999 the party congress passed a resolution that Taiwan was already an independent country, under the official name "Republic of China", and that any constitutional changes should be approved by the people via referendum, while emphasizing the use of the name "Taiwan" in international settings.

Despite its lack of electoral success, the pressure that the DPP created on the ruling KMT via its demands are widely credited in the political reforms of the 1990s, most notably the direct popular election of Republic of China's president and all representatives in the National Assembly and Legislative Yuan, as well as the ability to openly discuss events from the past such as the February 28 Incident and its long aftermath of martial law, and space for a greater variety of political views and advocacy. Once the DPP had representation in the Legislative Yuan, the party used the legislature as a forum to challenge the ruling KMT.

In 1996, DPP Chairman Shih Ming-teh united with the New Party to run for the President of the Legislative Yuan, but lost by one vote. The vote that was missing was legislator Chang Chin-cheng's failure to vote for Shih. As a result, Chang was expelled from the DPP.

Post-democratization, the DPP shifted their focus to anti-corruption issues, in particular regarding KMT connections to organized crime as well as "party assets" illegally acquired from the government during martial law. Meanwhile, factions continued to form within the DPP as a mechanism for coalition-building within the party; notably, future President Chen Shui-bian would form the Justice Alliance faction.

=== 2000–2008: in minority government ===
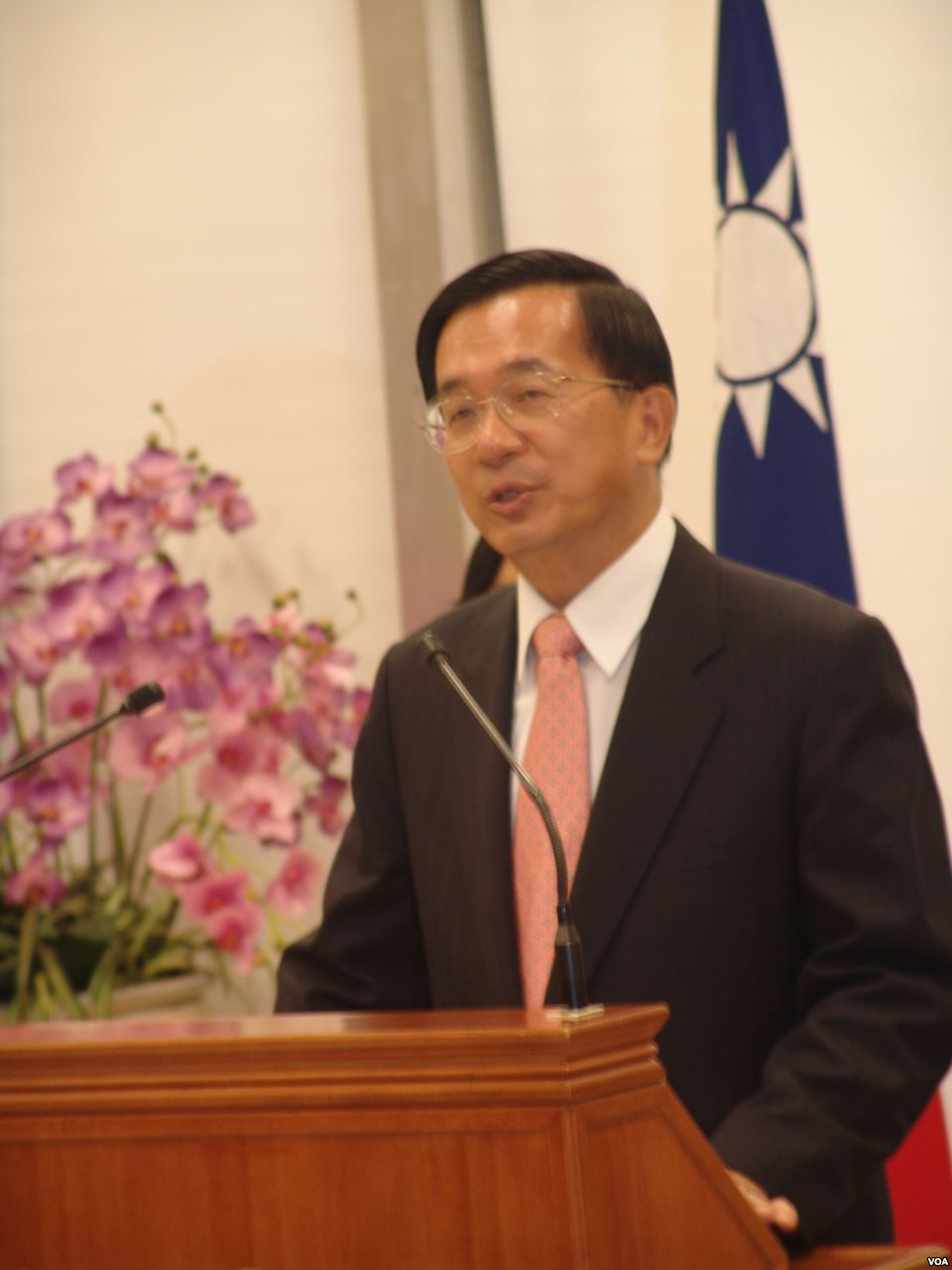
Former President Chen Shui-bian, the first DPP President (2000–2008)

The DPP won the presidency with the election of Chen Shui-bian in March 2000 with a plurality, due to Pan-Blue voters splitting their vote between the Kuomintang and independent candidate James Soong, ending 91 years of KMT rule in the Republic of China. Chen softened the party's stance on independence to appeal to moderate voters, appease the United States, and placate China. He also promised not to change the ROC state symbols or declare formal independence as long as the People's Republic of China did not attack Taiwan. Further, he advocated for economic exchange with China as well as the establishment of transportation links.

In 2001, the DPP ran an advertisement promoting the party that featured Adolf Hitler and others in an attempt to encourage young people to engage with politics. The DPP initially responded to criticism from the Israeli and German representative offices in Taiwan by saying the advertisement was meant to highlight "people who dared to express their opinions," and claimed some had deliberately misrepresented the content. The DPP's then chair Frank Hsieh later said the advertisement would be retired to avoid causing misunderstanding among victims of Nazism.

In 2002, the DPP became the first party other than the KMT to reach a plurality in the Legislative Yuan following the 2001 legislative election. However, a majority coalition between the KMT, People First Party, and New Party prevented it from taking control of the chamber. This coalition was at odds with the presidency from the beginning, and led to President Chen's abandonment of the centrist positions that he ran his campaign on.

In 2003, Chen announced a campaign to draft a referendum law as well as a new constitution, a move which appealed to the fundamentalist wing of the DPP. By now, the New Tide faction had begun to favor pragmatic approaches to their pro-independence goals and dominated decision-making positions within the party. By contrast, grassroots support was divided largely between moderate and fundamentalist wings. Though Chen's plans for a referendum on a new constitution were scuttled by the legislature, he did manage to include a largely symbolic referendum on the PRC military threat to coincide with the 2004 presidential election. President Chen Shui-bian would be narrowly re-elected in 2004 after an assassination attempt the day before the election, and in the later legislative election, the pan-blue coalition opposition retained control of the chamber.

President Chen's moves sparked a debate within the party between fundamentalists and moderates who were concerned that voters would abandon their party. The fundamentalists won out, and as a result the DPP would largely follow Chen's lead. The DPP suffered a significant election defeat in nationwide local and county elections in December 2005, while the pan-blue coalition captured 16 of 23 county and city government offices under the leadership of popular Taipei mayor and KMT Party Chairman Ma Ying-jeou. Moderates within the party would blame this loss on the party's fundamentalist turn.

The results led to a shake up of the party leadership. Su Tseng-chang resigned as DPP chairman soon after election results were announced. Su had pledged to step down if the DPP lost either Taipei County or failed to win 10 of the 23 mayor/magistrate positions. Vice President Annette Lu was appointed acting DPP leader. Presidential Office Secretary-General Yu Shyi-kun was elected in a three-way race against legislator Chai Trong-rong and Wong Chin-chu with 54.4% of the vote.

Premier Frank Hsieh, DPP election organizer and former mayor of Kaohsiung twice tendered a verbal resignation immediately following the election, but his resignation was not accepted by President Chen until 17 January 2006 after the DPP chairmanship election had concluded. The former DPP Chairman Su Tseng-chang was appointed to replace Hsieh as premier. Hsieh and his cabinet resigned en masse on 24 January to make way for Su and his new cabinet. President Chen had offered the position of Presidential Office Secretary-General (vacated by Su) to the departing premier, but Hsieh declined and left office criticizing President Chen for his tough line on dealing with China.

In 2005, following the passage of the Anti-Secession Law, the Chen administration issued a statement asserting the position that Taiwan's future should be decided by the people on Taiwan only.

On 30 September 2007, the DPP approved a resolution asserting a separate identity from China and called for the enactment of a new constitution for a "normal nation". It struck an accommodating tone by advocating general use of "Taiwan" as the country's name without calling for abandonment of the name Republic of China.

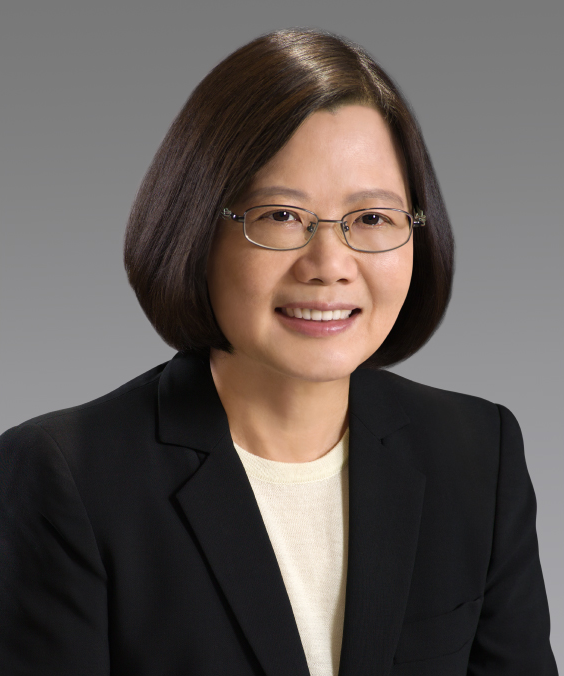
Tsai Ing-wen, the second DPP President (2016–2024) and the leader of the DPP (2008–2022). Tsai is the first female leader of the DPP.

=== 2008–2016: return to opposition ===
In the national elections held in early months of 2008, the DPP won less than 25% of the seats (38.2% vote share) in the new Legislative Yuan while its presidential candidate, former Kaohsiung mayor Frank Hsieh, lost to KMT candidate Ma Ying-jeou by a wide margin (41.55% vs. 58.45%). In May, the DPP elected moderate Tsai Ing-wen as their new leader over fundamentalist Koo Kwang-ming. Tsai became the first female leader of the DPP and the first female leader to lead a major party in Taiwan.

The first months since backed to the opposition were dominated by press coverage of the travails of Chen Shui-bian and his wife Wu Shu-jen. On 15 August 2008, Chen resigned from the DPP and apologized: "Today I have to say sorry to all of the DPP members and supporters. I let everyone down, caused you humiliation and failed to meet your expectations. My acts have caused irreparable damage to the party. I love the DPP deeply and am proud of being a DPP member. To express my deepest regrets to all DPP members and supporters, I announce my withdrawal from the DPP immediately. My wife Wu Shu-jen is also withdrawing from the party." DPP Chairperson followed with a public statement on behalf of the party: "In regard to Chen and his wife's decision to withdraw from the party and his desire to shoulder responsibility for his actions as well as to undergo an investigation by the party's anti-corruption committee, we respect his decision and accept it."

The DPP vowed to reflect on public misgivings towards the party. Chairperson Tsai insisted on the need for the party to remember its history, defend the Republic of China's sovereignty and national security, and maintain its confidence.

The party re-emerged as a voice in Taiwan's political debate when Ma's administration reached the end of its first year in office. The DPP marked the anniversary with massive rallies in Taipei and Kaohsiung. Tsai's address to the crowd in Taipei on 17 May proclaimed a "citizens' movement to protect Republic of China" seeking to "protect our democracy and protect Republic of China."

=== 2016–2024: in majority government ===
On 16 January 2016, Taiwan held a general election for its presidency and for the Legislative Yuan. The DPP gained the presidential seat, with the election of Tsai Ing-wen, who received 56.12% of the votes, while her opponent Eric Chu gained 31.2%. In addition, the DPP gained a majority of the Legislative Yuan, winning 68 seats in the 113-seat legislature, up from 40 in 2012 election, thus giving them the majority for the first time in its history.

President Tsai won reelection in the 2020 Taiwanese presidential election on 11 January 2020, and the Democratic Progressive Party retained its legislative majority, winning 61 seats.

=== 2024–present: return to minority government ===
The 13 January 2024 presidential election and legislative elections led to the election of Lai Ching-te who won with 40.1% of the votes, while his opponents, Hou Yu-ih of the KMT had 33.5% of the votes, and Ko Wen-je of the Taiwan People's Party with 26.5% of the vote. In addition, this election made the DPP the first party to win three consecutive presidential terms since direct elections were introduced in 1996. The DPP was unable to retain its majority in the Legislative Yuan, losing ten seats.

== Ideology and policies ==
The DPP's political stance is described as centrist, centre-left, or left-wing. It is also sometimes described as "right-wing" by pro-China media outlets owing to its anti-CCP stance. Jacobin, a left-wing socialist magazine in the United States, has referred to the DPP as "centre-left" and mentioned it as part of "Taiwanese Left". The DPP is generally described as progressive. It has also been described as liberal, social liberal, as well as social democratic.

The party takes a Taiwanese nationalist position, advocating for strengthening Taiwanese identity; the party opposes the Kuomintang's and mainland China's pan-Chinese nationalism, and criticizes China's claims of sovereignty over Taiwan as 'colonialism' or 'imperialism'. The party also defines its own identity as an "anti-communist" or "anti-imperialist" in the context of opposition to the PRC and united front.

Programs supported by the party include moderate social welfare policies involving the rights of women, senior citizens, children, young people, labor, minorities, indigenous peoples, farmers, and other disadvantaged sectors of the society. Furthermore, its platform includes a legal and political order based on human rights and democracy; balanced economic and financial administration; fair and open social welfare; educational and cultural reform; and, independent defense and peaceful foreign policy with closer ties to the United States and Japan. The party is socially liberal and has a progressive stance that includes support for gender equality and same-sex marriage under Tsai's leadership, and also has a conservative base that includes support from the Presbyterian Church in Taiwan.

The party also made transitional justice a core legislative and political goal, passing laws that mandated the formation of an independent Transitional Justice Commission to address legacies from the authoritarian era under the Kuomintang, and promoted the removal or renaming of public symbols, memorials, and spaces that commemorated the authoritarian leader Chiang Kai-shek.

=== Stance on Taiwan independence ===
The primary political axis in Taiwan involves the issue of Taiwan independence versus Chinese unification. Although the differences tend to be portrayed in polarized terms, both major coalitions have developed modified, nuanced and often complex positions. Though opposed in the philosophical origins, the practical differences between such positions can sometimes be subtle.

The current official position of the party is that Taiwan is an independent and sovereign country whose territory consists of Taiwan and its surrounding smaller islands and whose sovereignty derives only from the ROC citizens living in Taiwan (similar philosophy of self-determination), based on the 1999 "Resolution on Taiwan's Future". It considers Taiwan an independent nation under the name of Republic of China, making a formal declaration of independence unnecessary. Though calls for drafting a new constitution and a declaration of a Republic of Taiwan was written into the party charter in 1991, the 1999 resolution has practically superseded the earlier charter. The DPP rejects the so-called "One China principle" defined in 1992 as the basis for official diplomatic relations with the PRC and advocates a Taiwanese national identity which is separate from mainland China.

By contrast, the KMT or pan-blue coalition agrees that the Republic of China is an independent and sovereign country that is not part of the PRC, but argues that a one China principle (with different definitions across the strait) can be used as the basis for talks with China. The KMT also opposes Taiwan independence and argues that efforts to establish a Taiwanese national identity separated from the Chinese national identity are unnecessary and needlessly provocative. Some KMT conservative officials have called efforts from DPP "anti-China" (opposing migrants from mainland China, who DPP officials did not recognize as Taiwanese, but Chinese). At the other end of the political spectrum, the acceptance by the DPP of the symbols of the Republic of China is opposed by the Taiwan Solidarity Union.

The first years of the DPP as the ruling party drew accusations from the opposition as a self-styled Taiwanese nationalist party, the DPP was itself inadequately sensitive to the ethnographic diversity of Taiwan's population. Where the KMT had been guilty of "Chinese chauvinism", the critics charged, the DPP might offer nothing more as a remedy than "Hoklo chauvinism". The DPP argues that its efforts to promote a Taiwanese national identity are merely an effort to normalize a Taiwanese identity repressed during years of authoritarian Kuomintang rule.

=== Support ===
Since the democratization of Taiwan in the 1990s, the DPP has had its strongest performance in the Hokkien-speaking counties and cities of Taiwan, compared with the predominantly Hakka and Mandarin-speaking counties, that tend to support the Kuomintang.

The deep-rooted hostility between Taiwanese aborigines and (Taiwanese) Hoklo, and the effective KMT networks within aboriginal communities contribute to aboriginal skepticism against the DPP and the aboriginals' tendency to vote for the KMT. Aboriginals have criticized politicians for abusing the "indigenization" movement for political gains, such as aboriginal opposition to the DPP's "rectification" by recognizing the Truku for political reasons, where the Atayal and Seediq slammed the Truku for their name rectification. In 2008, the majority of mountain townships voted for Ma Ying-jeou. However, the DPP share of the aboriginal vote has been rising.

== Corruption ==
The DPP has been plagued by several corruption scandals which has increased feelings amongst voters that fraud is an acceptable practice within the party.

Former DPP president of Taiwan Chen Shui-bian has also been involved in a raft of corruption scandals that continue to affect the party's reputation. Chen was sentenced to life imprisonment on corruption charges in 2009 that his supporters said were politically motivated. Chen was acquitted of embezzling millions of New Taiwan Dollars from a special presidential fund while he was in power, but was found guilty of money laundering and forging documents, and was given an additional two-year sentence. As Taiwan president Tsai Ing-wen prepared to leave office in 2024, she declined to comment on whether or not she would pardon Chen of his corruption convictions. In the end, there was no presidential pardon delivered to Chen.

In 2024, the former DPP vice premier Cheng Wen-tsan was detained on corruption charges relating to his time as Mayor of Taoyuan, former DPP Tainan City Council speaker Lai Mei-hui received a 2-year suspended sentence for corruption, and prosecutors began an investigation into DPP Legislator Lin I-chin for allegedly fraudulently claiming public funds.

In June 2025, Kaohsiung DPP representative Lin Dai-hua was indicted alongside nine others for embezzling nearly NT$15 million by misappropriating city funds designated as wages for her assistants.

== Structure ==
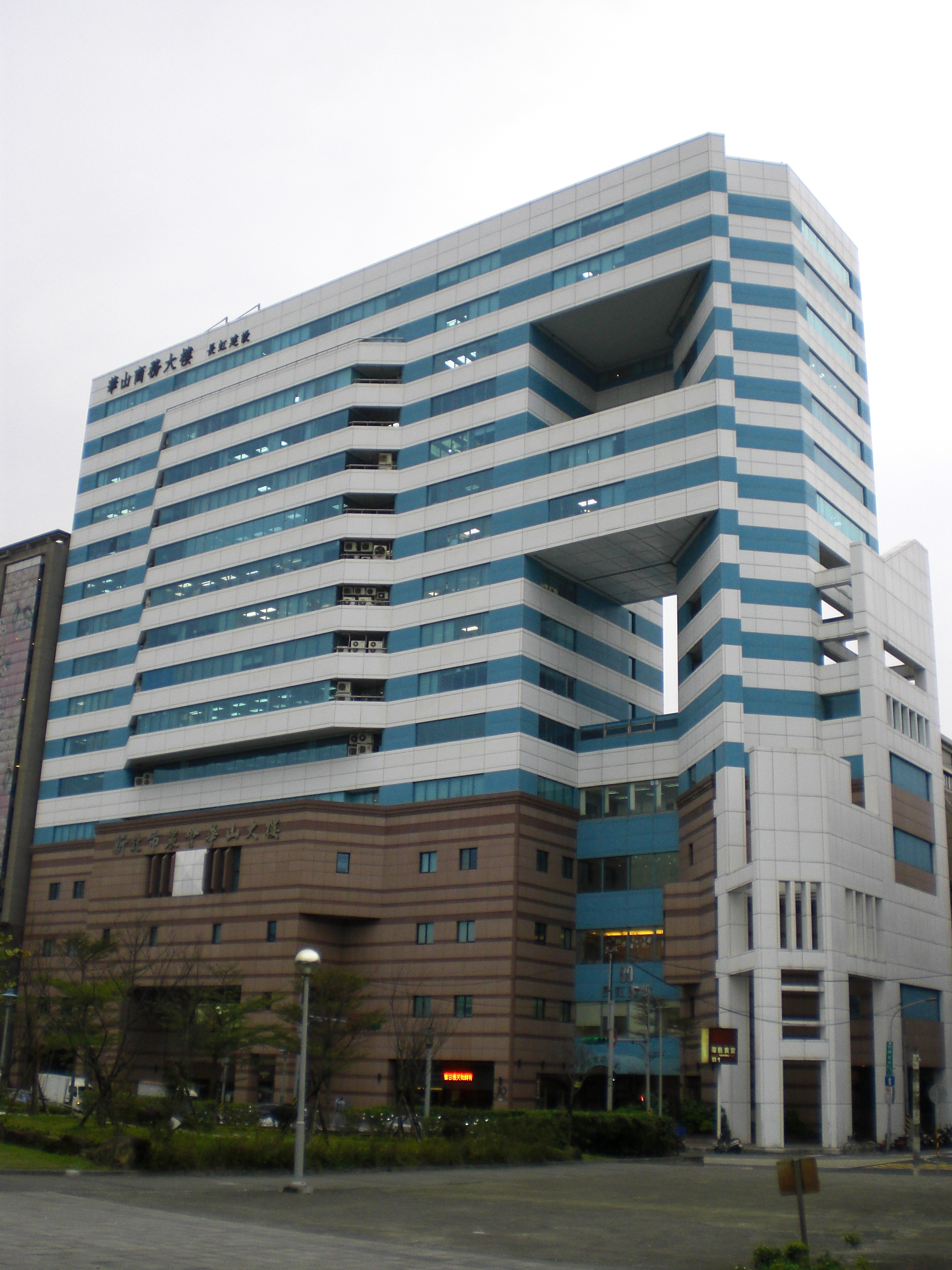
DPP headquarters at Huashan Business Building Level 10 in Taipei.

The DPP National Party Congress selects, for two-year terms, the 30 members of the Central Executive Committee and the 11 members of the Central Review Committee. The Central Executive Committee, in turn, chooses the 10 members of the Central Standing Committee. Since 2012, the DPP has had a Department of China Affairs to deal with Cross-Strait relations; the name caused some controversy within the party and in the Taiwan media, with critics suggesting that "Mainland Affairs Committee" or "Cross-Strait Affairs Committee" would show less of a hostile "One Country on Each Side" attitude.

=== Factions ===
For many years the DPP officially recognized several factions within its membership, such as the New Tide faction (新潮流系), the Formosa faction (美麗島系), the Justice Alliance faction (正義連線系) and Welfare State Alliance faction (福利國系). Different factions endorse slightly different policies and are often generationally identifiable, representing individuals who had entered the party at different times. In 2006, the party ended recognition of factions. The factions have since stated that they will comply with the resolution. However, the factions are still referred to by name in national media.

As of 2022, Taiwan News identified at least 7 factions within the party:

- New Tide faction (新潮流系) - William Lai, Chen Chu, Tsai Chi-chang, Chiu Tai-san, Pan Men-an, Lai Pin-yu
- TNCPA (正國會) - Lin Chia-lung, Fifi Chen Ting-fei, Lin You-chang
- Green Fellowship Association (綠色友誼系統) - Ho Chih-wei
- Taiwan Forward(湧言會) - Lin Kun-hai, Hsu Kuo-yung
- Su Faction(蘇系) - Su Tseng-chang
- Ing Faction (英系)- Tsai Ing-wen, Chen Ming-wen, Kuan Bi-ling
- Democracy Living Water Connection(民主活水連線) - Cho Jung-tai, Luo Wen-jia, Lin Fei-fan

=== Chair ===
- Current Chair: Lai Ching-te

=== Secretary-General ===
- Current Secretary-General: Lin Hsi-yao (since May 2020)

=== Legislative Yuan leader (caucus leader) ===
- Shih Ming-teh (1 February 1993 – 1 February 2002)
- Ker Chien-ming (since 1 February 2002)

== Election results ==
=== Presidential elections ===
Election	Candidate	Running mate	Total votes	Share of votes	Outcome
1996	Peng Ming-min	Frank Hsieh Chang-ting	2,274,586	21.13%	Defeated
2000	Chen Shui-bian	Annette Lu Hsiu-lien	4,977,737	39.30%	Elected
2004	Chen Shui-bian	Annette Lu Hsiu-lien	6,446,900	50.11%	Elected
2008	Frank Hsieh Chang-ting	Su Tseng-chang	5,445,239	41.55%	Defeated
2012	Tsai Ing-wen	Su Jia-chyuan	6,093,578	45.63%	Defeated
2016	Tsai Ing-wen	Chen Chien-jen ( Ind.)	6,894,744	56.12%	Elected
2020	Tsai Ing-wen	Lai Ching‑te	8,170,231	57.13%	Elected
2024	Lai Ching-te	Hsiao Bi-khim	5,586,019	40.05%	Elected

=== Legislative elections ===
Election	Total seats won	Total votes	Share of votes	Changes	Party leader	Status	President
1989	21 / 130				Huang Hsin-chieh	Minority	Lee Teng-hui
1992	51 / 161	2,944,195	31.0%	▲30 seats	Hsu Hsin-liang	Minority	Lee Teng-hui
1995	54 / 164	3,132,156	33.2%	▲3 seats	Shih Ming-teh	Minority	Lee Teng-hui
1998	70 / 225	2,966,834	29.6%	▲16 seats	Lin Yi-hsiung	Minority	Lee Teng-hui
2001	87 / 225	3,447,740	36.6%	▲21 seats	Chen Shui-bian	Minority	Chen Shui-bian
2004	89 / 225	3,471,429	37.9%	▲2 seats	Chen Shui-bian	Minority	Chen Shui-bian
2008	27 / 113	3,775,352	38.2%	▼62 seats	Chen Shui-bian	Minority	Ma Ying-jeou
2012	40 / 113	4,556,526	34.6%	▲13 seats	Tsai Ing-wen	Minority	Ma Ying-jeou
2016	68 / 113	5,370,953	44.1%	▲28 seats	Tsai Ing-wen	Majority	Tsai Ing-wen
2020	61 / 113	4,811,241	33.98%	▼7 seats	Cho Jung-tai	Majority	Tsai Ing-wen
2024	51 / 113	4,981,060	36.16%	▼10 seats	Lai Ching-te	Minority	Lai Ching-te

=== Local elections ===
Election	Magistrates and mayors	Councilors	Township/city mayors	Township/city council representatives	Village chiefs	Party leader
1994 provincial	1 / 3	52 / 175	—N/a	—N/a	—N/a	Shih Ming-teh
1997–1998	12 / 23	114 / 886	28 / 319	—N/a	—N/a	Hsu Hsin-liang
1998 municipal	1 / 2	28 / 96	—N/a	—N/a	—N/a	Lin Yi-hsiung
2001–2002	9 / 23	147 / 897	28 / 319	—N/a	—N/a	Chen Shui-bian
2002 municipal	1 / 2	31 / 96	—N/a	—N/a	—N/a	Chen Shui-bian
2005	6 / 23	192 / 901	35 / 319	—N/a	—N/a	Chen Shui-bian
2006 municipal	1 / 2	33 / 96	—N/a	—N/a	—N/a	Chen Shui-bian
2009	4 / 17	128 / 587	34 / 211	—N/a	—N/a	Tsai Ing-wen
2010 municipal	2 / 5	130 / 314	—N/a	—N/a	220 / 3,757	Tsai Ing-wen
2014 unified	13 / 22	291 / 906	54 / 204	194 / 2,137	390 / 7,836	Tsai Ing-wen
2018 unified	6 / 22	238 / 912	40 / 204	151 / 2,148	285 / 7,744	Tsai Ing-wen
2022 unified	5 / 22	277 / 910	35 / 204	123 / 2,139	226 / 7,748	Tsai Ing-wen

=== National Assembly elections ===
Election	Total seats won	Total votes	Share of votes	Changes	Party leader	Status	President
1991	66 / 325	2,036,271	23.3%	▲66 seats	Huang Shin-chieh	Minority	Lee Teng-hui
1996	99 / 334	3,121,423	29.9%	▲33 seats	Shih Ming-teh	Minority	Lee Teng-hui
2005	127 / 300	1,647,791	42.52%	▲28 seats	Annette Lu Hsiu-lien	Plurality	Chen Shui-bian

== See also ==
- Progressivism in Taiwan
- Human rights in Taiwan
- Taiwan Value
- Culture of Taiwan
- Taiwan independence movement
  - Taiwan the Formosa
- Taiwan consensus
- Taiwanese people
- "Green Terror", a political pejorative for DPP rule
- Resolution on Taiwan's Future
- Referendums in Taiwan
- Foreign relations of Taiwan
- February 28 Incident
- Formosa Incident
- Sunflower Student Movement
- List of major liberal parties considered left
