= Roger Hsieh =

Taiwanese politician (1934–2019)

Hsieh Tsung-min MLY
- 謝聰敏
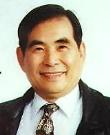

Member of the Legislative Yuan
- In office 1 February 1996 – 31 January 1999
- Constituency: Changhua County
- In office 1 February 1993 – 31 January 1996
- Constituency: Republic of China

Personal details
- Born: 2 May 1934 Taiwan, Empire of Japan
- Died: 8 September 2019 (aged 85) New Taipei, Taiwan
- Party: Democratic Progressive Party
- Education: National Taiwan University (LLB); National Chengchi University (MA)

Hsieh Tsung-min (Chinese: 謝聰敏; 2 May 1934 – 8 September 2019), also known by his English name Roger Hsieh, was a Taiwanese politician and lawyer. He won election to the Legislative Yuan in 1992 and 1995; he ran again unsuccessfully in 1998 and 2001.

== Education and activism ==
Hsieh attended Taichung First High School, studied law at National Taiwan University alongside Wei Ting-chao, and completed graduate work in political science at National Chengchi University.

While studying at National Taiwan University, Hsieh, Wei and legal academic Peng Ming-min printed 10,000 copies of the "Declaration of Self-Salvation of the Taiwanese People," a manifesto advocating the overthrow of the Kuomintang one-party state. The three were promptly arrested; Hsieh was subject to torture. Hsieh and Wei were later released but did not play a role in their mentor's escape to Sweden, though the government suspected the pair of aiding Peng.

On 23 February 1971, a military court indicted Hsieh, Wei, and others on charges of sedition, accusing them of being misled by Peng, who had fled to the United States, and of conspiring with others to commit the Bank of America bombing in Taipei earlier that month with the aim of "promoting rebellion". For his support of democracy, Hsieh spent over eleven years behind bars.

Following his release, Hsieh spent seven years in the United States, and returned to Taiwan in 1986. Demonstrators gathered at Chiang Kai-shek International Airport on 30 November 1986 to show support for Hsieh and fellow dissident Hsu Hsin-liang. Barred from entry into Taiwan on that day, the two explored alternative means of getting into the country and eventually succeeded.

In December 2018, Hsieh was exonerated by the Transitional Justice Commission.

== Political career ==
Another NTU classmate, Kuomintang member Shih Chi-yang, aided Hsieh's early political career. With the support of Huang Hsin-chieh, Hsieh was elected to the Legislative Yuan in 1992 and 1995, though he lost election in 1998. During his legislative tenure, Hsieh attempted to pass bills regarding compensation to victims of the White Terror like himself. According to legislative inquires launched by Hsieh, the White Terror period saw over 29,000 people tried in court. Subsequently, Hsieh was named an adviser to President Chen Shui-bian. While serving in this position, Hsieh spent much of his time investigating the La Fayette-class frigate bribery scandal. As a result of Hsieh's probe, Andrew Wang, an accused arms dealer, filed a lawsuit against him in August 2001, an action that was later reviewed by the Control Yuan. Hsieh resigned as presidential adviser in 2001 to run in that year's legislative elections.

== Death ==
Hsieh died in a hospital in New Taipei on 8 September 2019, aged 85.
