= Yau Yat Tsuen (constituency) =

Constituency of the Sham Shui Po District Council of Hong Kong

- Elected constituency for the Sham Shui Po District Council
- Boundary of Yau Yat Tsuen in Sham Shui Po District
- District: Sham Shui Po
- Legislative Council constituency: Kowloon West
- Population: 14,650 (2019)
- Electorate: 6,497 (2019)

Current constituency
- Created: 2007
- Number of members: One
- Member: Vacant
- Created from: Tai Hang Tung & Yau Yat Tsuen

Yau Yat Tsuen is one of the 25 constituencies in the Sham Shui Po District of Hong Kong.

The constituency returns one district councillor to the Sham Shui Po District Council, with an election every four years. The seat is currently vacant. It was last held by Lawrence Lau Wai-chung, who defeated the then incumbent Dominic Lee Tsz-king of the Liberal Party (LP).

Derived from Tai Hang Tung & Yau Yat Tsuen in 2007, Yau Yat Tsuen constituency is loosely based on residential areas Tak Chee Yuen, Yau Yat Tsuen, Mount Beacon and the City University of Hong Kong in Kowloon Tong with estimated population of 14,650.

== Councillors represented ==
Election	Member	Party
2007	Kwok Chun-wah	Independent
2012	Kwok Chun-wah	Economic Synergy
2012	Kwok Chun-wah	BPA
2015	Dominic Lee Tsz-king	Liberal
2019	Lawrence Lau Wai-chung→Vacant	Nonpartisan

== Election results ==
=== 2010s ===
Sham Shui Po District Council Election, 2019: Yau Yat Tsuen
Party	Candidate	Votes	%	±%
Nonpartisan	Lawrence Lau Wai-chung	2,487	50.98	
Liberal	Dominic Lee Tsz-king	2,391	49.02	−20.88
Majority		96	1.96	
Turnout		4,894	75.33	
Nonpartisan gain from Liberal		Swing		

Sham Shui Po District Council Election, 2015: Yau Yat Tsuen
Party	Candidate	Votes	%	±%
Liberal	Dominic Lee Tsz-king	2,277	69.9	
LSD	Dickson Chau Ka-faat	982	30.1	
Majority		1,295	39.8	–4.9
Turnout		3,318	56.2	
Liberal gain from BPA		Swing		

Sham Shui Po District Council Election, 2011: Yau Yat Tsuen
Party	Candidate	Votes	%	±%
Independent (Economic Synergy)	Jimmy Kwok Chun-wah	1,451	72.33	+14.11
ADPL	Lee Kin-kan	555	27.67	−14.11
Majority		896	44.67	+31.12
Independent hold		Swing	+14.11	

=== 2000s ===
Sham Shui Po District Council Election, 2007: Yau Yat Tsuen
Party	Candidate	Votes	%	±%
Independent	Jimmy Kwok Chun-wah	1,031	58.22	
ADPL	Leung Kam-tao	740	41.78	
Majority		291	13.55	
Independent win (new seat)				
