= Peng Ming-min =

Taiwanese activist and legal scholar (1923–2022)

- 彭明敏
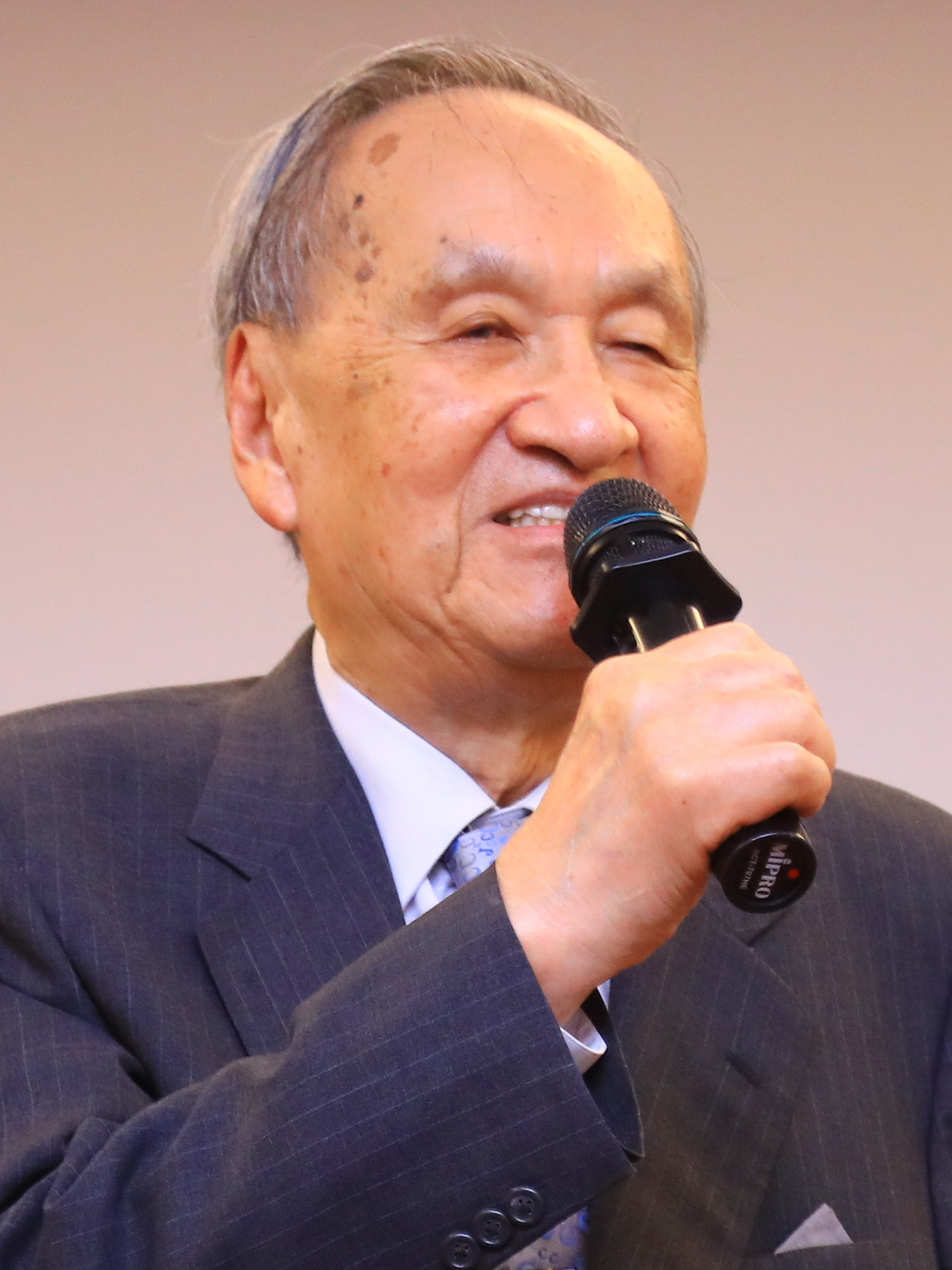
- Peng in 2017

Senior Adviser to the President of the Republic of China
- In office 20 May 2000 – 20 May 2008
- President: Chen Shui-bian

Personal details
- Born: 15 August 1923 Taikō Town, Taikō District, Taichū Prefecture, Taiwan, Japan (modern-day Dajia District, Taichung, Taiwan)
- Died: 8 April 2022 (aged 98) Taipei, Taiwan
- Party: Democratic Progressive Party (1995 – 1997)
- Education: Tokyo Imperial University (LLB); National Taiwan University (BA); McGill University (LLM); University of Paris (PhD)
- Profession: Lawyer

Peng Ming-min (Chinese: 彭明敏; pinyin: Péng Míngmǐn; Pe̍h-ōe-jī: Phêⁿ Bêng-bín; 15 August 1923 – 8 April 2022) was a Taiwanese democracy activist, advocate of Taiwan independence, legal scholar, and politician. Arrested for sedition in 1964 for printing a manifesto advocating democracy in his native Taiwan, he escaped to Sweden, before taking a post as a university teacher in the United States. After 22 years in exile he returned to become the Democratic Progressive Party's first presidential candidate in Taiwan's first direct presidential election in 1996.

== Early life and education ==
Peng was born in Taichū Prefecture on August 15, 1923, to a prominent and wealthy family of Taiwanese doctors. He received his primary education in Taiwan before going to Tokyo for secondary education, graduating from Kwansei Gakuin Middle School in 1939 and the Third Higher School in 1942. During World War II, he studied law and political science at the Tokyo Imperial University (now the University of Tokyo). At the end of the war, in order to avoid the American bombing of Japan's capital, he decided to go to his brother near Nagasaki. En route to his brother, he lost his left arm in a bombing raid. While recuperating at his brother's house, he witnessed the second atomic blast that destroyed the city of Nagasaki.

After the Japanese surrender, Peng returned to Taiwan and enrolled at National Taiwan University. He was studying for his bachelor's degree in political science when the February 28 Incident occurred.

During these terrifying weeks I remained quietly within my grandmother's house, frightened and worried. I had not been a member of any politically active group on the campus, and my name was on no petition or manifesto. No soldiers came to search our house, and I was not called out in the middle of the night as were some friends who disappeared. For all my hard work toward a degree in political science at the university, I was still far removed from practical politics and very naive. I had not yet fully realized how much more threatened our personal freedom was now than it had been under the Japanese. In several letters to my father at this time I expressed an angry reaction to the terrible things taking place at Taipei. I did not then know that my father's mail was being censored until one day the chief of police at Kaohsiung quietly warned my father to tell his son not to write such letters, and that my name too was now on a blacklist.

After receiving his bachelor's degree, Peng went on to pursue a master's degree (LL.M. 1953) at the Institute of Air and Space Law at the McGill University Faculty of Law in Montreal, Quebec, Canada, where he earned his LL.M. under John Cobb Cooper. He then completed doctoral studies in France and earned his doctoral degree in law at the University of Paris in 1954. During his studies, Peng wrote some of the first essays on international air law published in France, Canada and Japan. His publications attracted considerable international attention and distinguished Peng as a pioneer in the new field of international air law.

== Academic career and exile ==
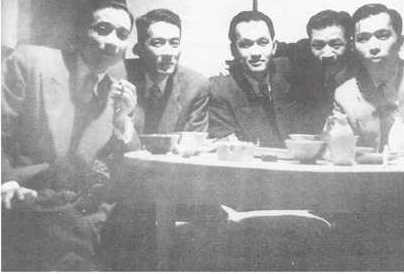
Peng Ming-min (center) with colleagues at National Taiwan University in 1954

Peng returned to Taiwan and in 1957, at age 34, he became the youngest full professor at the National Taiwan University. While Peng was a professor and chairman of the Department of Political Science from 1961 to 1962, he attracted the attention of Chiang Kai-shek and other Kuomintang (KMT) leaders. Chiang appointed Peng as the advisor to the Republic of China's delegation to the United Nations, then the highest political position held by any Taiwanese, and hinted of future high-level governmental appointments. He quoted:

My inner thoughts were in turmoil. The government and party bosses had made a great mistake in sending me to New York. This experience finally politicized me, and I was to lead a dual life thereafter, for many months, until I made a final commitment to challenge the dictatorship with a public demand for reform.

In 1964, Peng and two of his students, Hsieh Tsung-min and Wei Ting-chao, created a manifesto advocating the overthrow of the Chiang regime and the establishment of a democratic government in Taiwan. The three painstakingly printed 10,000 copies in secret, but before the manifesto could be distributed, Peng and his students were arrested on 20 September 1964. They languished in jail for several months before being tried for sedition by a military court. Peng was sentenced to eight years of imprisonment but his case attracted worldwide attention. Bowing to the increasing international pressure, Chiang Kai-shek released Peng from military prison 14 months later, but placed him under house arrest for life with strict surveillance.

By 1968, his house arrest had become so suffocating that friends and Takayuki Munakata, a member of the Taiwan independence movement in Japan helped plan for Peng's escape from Taiwan. In 1970, Peng managed to travel by plane to Hong Kong and from there to Sweden with a forged passport. He was granted political asylum in Sweden, but despite the freedom he enjoyed in Europe, he decided to pursue an appointment at the University of Michigan. Both the KMT and the Chinese Communist Party strenuously objected, but the United States granted his request for a visa and Peng arrived in Michigan in August 1970. During his time at Michigan, he wrote his autobiography A Taste of Freedom.

While in exile, Peng continued to be a leading figure in Taiwan politics and American foreign policy issues. In 1981, he co-founded the Formosan Association for Public Affairs (FAPA), a Taiwanese lobbying organization based in Washington D.C. Peng served as FAPA's president from 1986 to 1988 and chaired the Asia-Pacific Democracy Association in 1989. He also testified on Taiwan issues before the United States Congress on several occasions.

== Return to Taiwan ==
With the death of Chiang Ching-kuo in 1988, Lee Teng-hui assumed the presidency and began to reform the Taiwanese government. In 1992, he promulgated a revision of Article 100 of the Criminal Code which not only allowed Taiwanese to advocate independence without being charged with sedition, but also granted amnesty to political prisoners and ended the overseas blacklist. No longer threatened with arrest, Peng returned to Taiwan on 2 November 1992 to a crowd of 1,000 people at Taoyuan International Airport. He had been in exile for 22 years. Peng joined the Democratic Progressive Party in February 1995.

On 28 September 1995, after an arduous two-tiered nomination process involving 49 public debates around Taiwan, the Democratic Progressive Party nominated Peng as their candidate for Taiwan's first presidential elections. Outspokenly running on a platform of Taiwanese independence, he garnered 21% of the votes, a distant second to the incumbent Lee Teng-hui, who won the election.

1996 Republic of China Presidential Election Result
| President Candidate | Vice President Candidate | Party | Votes | % |
|---|---|---|---|---|
| Lee Teng-hui | Lien Chan | Kuomintang | 5,813,699 | 54.00 |
| Peng Ming-min | Frank Hsieh | Democratic Progressive Party | 2,274,586 | 21.13 |
| Lin Yang-kang | Hau Pei-tsun | Independent | 1,603,790 | 14.90 |
| Chen Li-an | Wang Ching-feng | Independent | 1,074,044 | 9.98 |
| Invalid/blank votes | | | 117,160 | |
| Total | | | 10,883,279 | 100 |

In 2001, after Chen Shui-bian was elected president, Peng was appointed one of Chen's senior advisors.

== Later life and death ==
In 2009, Peng's A Perfect Escape (逃亡), was published in Chinese, revealing the details of his dramatic escape in 1970. In July 2015, Peng and three others founded the Taiwan Independence Action Party. English translations of his articles were occasionally published in the Taipei Times.

Peng died on 8 April 2022 at age 98. His remains were interred in a cemetery at the Presbyterian Church in Yancheng District, Kaohsiung.

== Personal life ==
Peng was an ardent baseball fan as a young boy, and when Babe Ruth visited Japan in the 1930s, he wrote a letter to Ruth and received an autograph in return.

Party political offices
| Preceded by Chai Trong-rong | President of the WUFI; 1972 | Succeeded by George Chang |
