= Chai Trong-rong =

Taiwanese politician (1935–2014)

- 蔡同榮
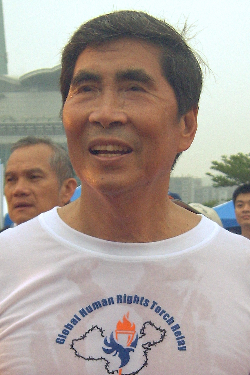
- Chai Trong-rong at 2008 CIPFG Global Human Rights Torch Relay in Taiwan

Member of the Legislative Yuan
- In office February 1, 2008 – January 31, 2012
- Constituency: Party-list ( Democratic Progressive Party)
- In office December 4, 1997 – January 31, 2008
- Preceded by: Vincent Siew
- Constituency: Chiayi
- In office February 1, 1993 – January 31, 1996
- Succeeded by: Vincent Siew
- Constituency: Chiayi

Chairman of the Democratic Progressive Party
- Acting; 21 September 2007 – 15 October 2007
- Preceded by: Yu Shyi-kun
- Succeeded by: Yu Shyi-kun

1st President of the WUFI
- In office 1970–1971
- Succeeded by: Peng Ming-min

Personal details
- Born: 13 June 1935 Hotei Village, Tōseki District, Tainan Prefecture, Japanese Taiwan (modern-day Budai, Chiayi County, Taiwan)
- Died: 11 January 2014 (aged 78) Taipei, Taiwan
- Party: Democratic Progressive Party
- Spouse: Lillian Chai (m. 1963)
- Children: 2
- Education: National Taiwan University (LLB); University of Tennessee (MA); University of Southern California (PhD)

Chai Trong-rong
- Traditional Chinese: 蔡同榮
- Simplified Chinese: 蔡同荣
Transcriptions
Standard Mandarin
- Hanyu Pinyin: Cài Tóngróng
- Wade–Giles: Tsʻai^{4} T‘ung^{2}-jung^{2}
Southern Min
- Hokkien POJ: Chhòa Tông-êng

Chai Trong-rong (Chinese: 蔡同榮; pinyin: Cài Tóngróng; Wade–Giles: Ts‘ài^{⁴} T‘ung^{²}-jung^{²}; Pe̍h-ōe-jī: Chhòa Tông-êng; June 13, 1935 – January 11, 2014), sometimes known in English as Trong Chai, was a Taiwanese politician.

Born in Japanese-era Taiwan, Chai earned his master's and doctorate degrees in the United States. He was a pro-democracy advocate and founded the Association for a Plebiscite (Chinese: 公民投票促進會; pinyin: Gōngmín Tóupiaò Cùjìnhùi) and Formosa Television.

A member of the Democratic Progressive Party (DPP), Chai was elected a national legislator multiple times, serving in the Legislative Yuan from 1993 to 1996 and again from 1997 to 2012. He took part in three DPP chairmanship elections, but lost all three.

== Early life and education ==
Chai Trong-rong was born on June 13, 1935, in Hotei Village, Tōseki District, Tainan Prefecture, Japanese Taiwan (modern-day Budai, Chiayi County, Taiwan). At the time, Taiwan was still part of the Empire of Japan. After the Second World War, his father served as a Chiayi County council member for two terms.

After his graduation from the National Tainan First Senior High School, Chai studied political science at National Taiwan University (NTU). He later switched his major to law and graduated from the NTU College of Law in 1958. He was then conscripted and served in the Republic of China (Taiwan) Army for sixteen months.

In 1960, Chai went to the United States and studied at the University of Tennessee, where he earned his master's degree in political science. As a result of participating in the Taiwan independence movement, Chai was placed on the Kuomintang's black list and was unable to return to Taiwan. He continued studying and attended the University of Southern California, earning his Ph.D. in public administration in 1969. His doctoral dissertation, completed under professor Charles G. Mayo, was titled, "Professionals in Communist China: conflict and accommodation".

In 1986, Chai became a professor of political science at the City University of New York.

== Entry into politics ==
Chai established the World United Formosans for Independence (WUFI) in 1970 and became its first president. Then in 1982, he founded the Formosan Association for Public Affairs (FAPA), serving as its first president as well.

Chai returned to Taiwan to attend a funeral in June 1990. He was issued a new passport and joined the Democratic Progressive Party (DPP) shortly after his arrival. He founded the Association for a Plebiscite in November. The goal of the association was to reform through the will of the people.

== Legislative career ==
Chai was elected a legislator representing Chiayi City in 1992. Although he was not reelected in 1995 running against Vincent Siew of the Kuomintang, he was elected into the Legislative Yuan again in the 1997 by-election and reelected in 1998, 2001 and 2004. During these terms, Chai was involved in the National Defense, Overseas Compatriot Affairs, and Foreign Affairs Committees.

He supported the localization policies of the Chen Shui-bian administration. In 2005, he urged the Ministry of Education to get rid of contexts of "aboveboard Chinese" (堂堂正正的中國人; a Chinese nationalistic term imposed by the Chiang Kai-shek regime after World War II) from the back cover of elementary school workbooks. In response to the Anti-Secession Law of the People's Republic of China, Chai and legislator Chuang He-chi proposed draft for an "Anti-Annexation Law."

=== Chairmanship campaigns ===
Despite the fact that Chai was endorsed by renowned pharmacologist Chen-Yuan Lee, he lost the DPP chairmanship election in 1996. However, the resignation of Su Tseng-chang as DPP chairperson in 2005 led to Chai's decision to run again. He was the first in the party to register his candidacy.

Chai was one of the three candidates who registered. He was endorsed by vice president Annette Lu and foreign minister Mark Chen. The election was held in January 2006. Former Secretary-General of the Presidential Office Yu Shyi-kun won with over 54% of the votes while Chai received 36%.

In 2008, after the defeat of Frank Hsieh in the presidential election, DPP candidate Hsieh resigned as chairman and announced the date for the chairmanship election. Chai declared his candidacy on April 14.

Although the DPP passed a resolution to ban all factions within the party in 2006, discord between former members of different factions was still present, and was thought to be one of the factors that led to the DPP's loss in the presidential election. Chai, along with Koo Kwang-ming, emphasized the importance of consolidating the party's policy on independence, while Tsai Ing-wen focused on the cooperation of former factions and expansion of the party's support base.

Chai was supported by Tainan City mayor Hsu Tain-tsair, but decided to withdraw from the race in May and gave his support to another candidate, Koo Kwang-ming. However, it was too late to officially withdraw from the election, and Chai received 5% of the votes.

== Personal life and death ==
Chai married Tsai Li-jung in 1963. He had two Ivy League-educated daughters, Jessie and Justine, and, later, four grandchildren. Chai died on January 11, 2014, due to multiple organ failure.

Party political offices
New title	President of the WUFI; 1970–1971	Succeeded by Peng Ming-min
Preceded by Yu Shyi-kun	Chairperson of the Democratic Progressive Party (acting); 21 September – 15 October 2007	Succeeded by Chen Shui-bian
