= Taiwan Value =

Political jargon in Taiwan

Taiwan Value (Chinese: 臺灣價值) or Taiwanese Values, is a political term associated with Republic of China (Taiwan) president Tsai Ing-wen. Tsai often promotes the term in her speech, which typically includes commonly accepted values and norms of Taiwanese society. The exact definition of the Taiwan Value is ambiguous and has become controversial among media and political commentaries, and is often used satirically by the critics of Democratic Progressive Party (DPP).

== History ==
The term was coined by Tsai Ing-wen in her interview with SET iNews on 22 January 2018 when the program host asked Tsai if she considers Ko Wen-je, then mayor of Taipei and independent politician, a political ally to her and her Democratic Progressive Party (DPP). Tsai responded that she would need Ko to "affirm Taiwanese values, then will DPP voters accept him". On 23 January 2018, former DPP legislator Lin Cho-shui asked Tsai to clarify the meaning of "Taiwan Value" as the term was ambiguous. Later Ko responded to Tsai that Taiwanese values are "universal values" such as democracy, freedom, human rights, and diversity. He rhetorically asked Tsai to expound her definition of Taiwanese values. Tsai was reportedly dissatisfied with Ko's answer, and told him that Taiwanese value is to "concretely realize the policies of DPP".

In November 2018 Taiwanese local elections, DPP candidate for mayor of Taipei Pasuya Yao suggested that "Green (DPP and its allies) is Taiwan value". This speech was mocked by the DPP critics and became a satirical term to ridicule Tsai's government. Political parties in Taiwan often use the term to criticize DPP's policy.

When Tsai Ing-wen visited to Caribbean diplomatic allies in 2019, she pledged to promote Taiwanese values.

== See also ==
- Taiwan consensus
- Taiwanese nationalism
- Universal value
- Asian values
- Lion Rock Spirit
