= Justice League (disambiguation) =

Justice League mainly refers to the Justice League of America, a fictional team of DC Comics superheroes.

Justice League may also refer to:

== Arts and entertainment ==
In the DC Comics universe

- Justice League (film), a 2017 live-action film based on the team
  - Justice League (soundtrack), the soundtrack from the film, by Danny Elfman
  - Zack Snyder's Justice League, the director's cut of the film
    - Zack Snyder's Justice League (soundtrack), the soundtrack from the film, by Junkie XL
- Justice League (Smallville), the version of the superhero team in the television series Smallville
- Justice League (TV series), a 2001–2004 animated television series
  - Justice League, a 2001 animated television film that served as the television pilot for the series Justice League (split into the three-parter series premiere Secret Origins for reruns)
  - Justice League Unlimited, a 2004–2006 animated continuation of the series
- Justice League: Crisis on Two Earths, a 2010 direct-to-video animated film
- Justice League: War, a 2014 direct-to-video animated film
- Justice League of America (film), a 1997 live-action television pilot and film
- Justice League, any of several various DC Comics superhero teams
  - Justice League Europe, a DC Comics superhero team set in European backdrops
  - Justice League International, a DC Comics superhero team having international status
- Justice League of America, a DC Comics superhero team set in the United States of America
- Justice League (comic book), a comic book title from DC Comics
- Justice Leagues, a DC Comics comic book miniseries from 2001

Music

- J.U.S.T.I.C.E. League, an American group of hip-hop producers

== See also ==
- Justice League in other media, listing various properties called "Justice League" associated with the DC Comics creation
- Justus League, a hip-hop collective
- League of the Just (also called League of Justice), an early Christian communist organization
