= Justice Alliance faction =

Justice Alliance 正義連線
- Leader: Chen Shui-bian
- Founded: 1991
- Dissolved: 2006
- Ideology: Third Way; Taiwanese nationalism Progressivism; Liberalism
- Political position: Centre to centre-left
- National affiliation: Democratic Progressive Party

The Justice Alliance (Chinese: 正義連線) was one of the largest factions of the Democratic Progressive Party, founded in 1991 by Chen Shui-bian. Other members included Hsu Tain-tsair, Annette Lu, and Su Huan-chih. All DPP factions were officially dissolved in 2006.

== See also ==
- Politics of Taiwan
