= Leticia Lee =

Hong Kong activist (1964–2020)

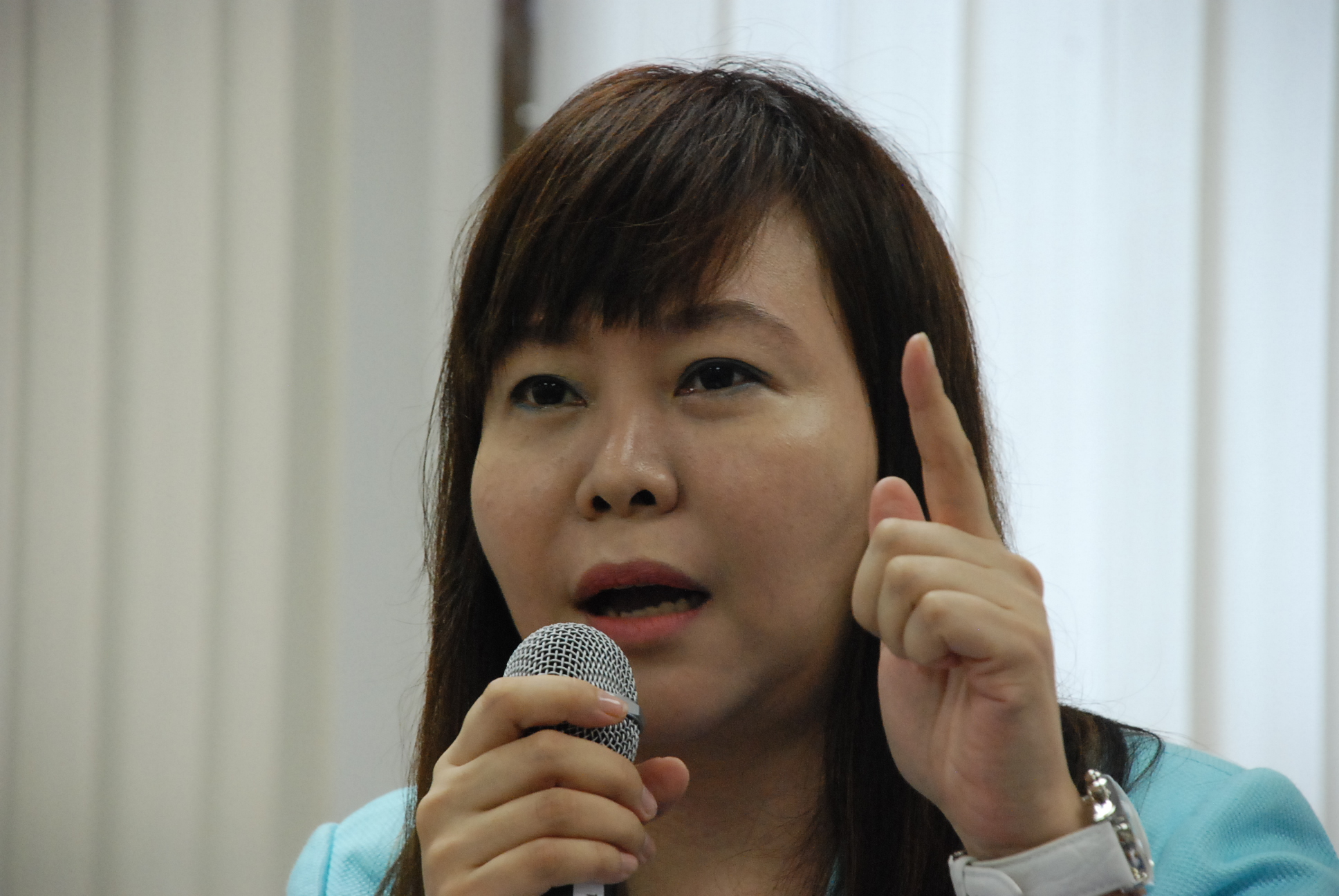
- Lee in 2013
- Born: Lee Yim-ching (李艷青); 17 August 1964; British Hong Kong
- Died: 16 December 2020 (aged 56); Yuen Long, Hong Kong
- Other name: See Yin BB
- Years active: 2012–2020
- Known for: Opponent of Umbrella Movement and supporter of Hong Kong Police

Leticia Lee See-yin (Chinese: 李偲嫣; Jyutping: lei5 si1 jin1, 17 August 1964 – 16 December 2020) was an outspoken radical pro-Beijing figure in Hong Kong. She held several positions at various political and activist organisations in Hong Kong.

== Activism ==
Lee held several positions, including the chairperson of the Federation of Parent-Teacher Associations of Yau Tsim Mong District, the spokeswoman of the anti-gay organisation "Anti-Reverse Discrimination League" (反逆向歧視大聯盟), as well as the chief editor of the Christian publication Love Family Weekly (distributed free of charge in all Sun Hung Kai Properties shopping malls), and a member of the women's commission of the pro-Beijing Kowloon Federation of Associations, providing advice on education policy. She was previously employed by LegCo member Priscilla Leung as a part-time consultant.

=== National education ===
Lee was an adamant advocate of the highly controversial moral and national education (MNE) programme in Hong Kong, which was proposed in 2011 but was later shelved due to heated public criticism. "If we back down on the [implementation of] moral and national education subject, I don't know what our society, our children will see themselves as in the future," she said at a pro-national education rally in October. "We are always Chinese. Our root is always China." In a special meeting of the Legislative Council on 27 June 2011, Lee suggested that the government could consider implementing MNE as a core extracurricular activity or a monthly small-group learning activity, and students should not be examined on the subject. She stressed the importance of providing teachers with adequate teaching resources on MNE to ensure the quality of teaching. She also added that the government should attach importance to moral education which should be taught in schools starting from junior primary levels.

=== Opposition to anti-LGBT discrimination legislation ===
Lee was accused of promoting homophobic opinions. She claimed that legislation against sexual orientation discrimination might make it illegal for schools – especially religious ones – to "teach that homosexuality is wrong". She had sought talks with the Family Planning Association which she said publishes booklets advocating same-sex marriage. She considered that the booklets would brainwash impressionable children. She also wrote many articles on the website of anti-gay Christian right group the Society For Truth And Light. At a concert in January 2013, she said she had received many calls after she opposed a motion calling for public consultation on the proposed new law.

=== Anti-Occupy Central ===
As a pro-establishment activist, Lee organised a number of movements in support of the Hong Kong government and police and to protest the Occupy Central movement.

==== Justice Alliance ====
Justice Alliance 正義聯盟
- Founded: 27 October 2013
- Ideology: Chinese nationalism Pro-Hong Kong Police
- National affiliation: Radical pro-Beijing camp

Lee, as convenor of Justice Alliance, began an 'indefinite hunger strike' on 22 June 2014 at the Central Government Complex in Tamar, to voice her opposition to Occupy Central and urge a stricter government response to it and the protest organised by the pan-democrats earlier that month inside the Legislative Council building. She said during the hunger strike, "Protesters don't think they are violent since they have something to voice out. Does that mean they can rob if they have no money, and do such acts in the name of justice?" The hunger strike lasted three days; she was hospitalised on 25 June.

On 2 March 2016, the Justice Alliance announced the expulsion of Lee, its president, on the grounds of embezzlement.

==== Alliance in Support of Our Police Force ====
There was an increasing level of discontent in society regarding the Hong Kong Police Force due to the methods used by the police to deal with the pan-democratic protests and the controversy on whether the police violated the rule on using minimum force. In response to rising social discontent aimed at the Police Force after its use of force against democracy protests, Lee established Alliance in Support of our Police Force in early July 2014. Its stated aim was to support the police to enforce the law. She served as one of its convenors. A demonstration was held on 3 August 2014 in support of the police and the organisation set 4 August as the 'Support the Police Force Day'.. On the first anniversary of that day, the alliance was not reported to have turned out in support of police to face down 200 protesters incensed by a magistrate's conviction of a woman protester for assaulting a male police officer with her breast.

Following the 2016 Mong Kok civil unrest, the Alliance in Support of our Police Force organised a pro-police rally in Mong Kok, during which Lee called the previous week's unrest a "planned, rioting terrorist attack". There was a row during the demonstration as several of her fellow protesters accused her of fraudulently handling donations to the group. Lee denied the accusations.

==== Blue Ribbon Movement ====
Lee was also the convenor of the Blue Ribbon Movement. This movement was formed as a response to the wearing of yellow ribbons by supporters of Occupy Central. The wearing of a blue ribbon in Hong Kong symbolised opposition to the Occupy Central democracy movement and support for the Hong Kong Police Force. A number of incidents were reported involving Blue Ribbon Movement supporters attacking protestors participating in Occupy Central, as well as news reporters.

On 25 October 2014, a gathering was held by the anti-Occupy Central organisations, while reports claimed that reporters from Radio Television Hong Kong (RTHK) and Television Broadcasts Limited (TVB) were attacked by those who supported anti-Occupy Central. Responding to the incident, Lee, who had helped organise the Tsim Sha Tsui event, condemned the attackers but described the attacks as isolated incidents.

== Political career and corruption charges ==
Lee ran unsuccessfully in the 2016 Hong Kong legislative election. She declared her candidacy in the New Territories East constituency on 24 July 2016. The election was held on 4 September. Lee received 2,938 votes (0.5 per cent of votes cast in the constituency) and was not elected.

Lee was accused of corruption during the election. In October 2018, she was charged by the Independent Commission Against Corruption (ICAC) with failing to dispose of certain donated funds in accordance with election laws. Lee agreed with the facts of the case against her. She was given a bind-over order.

== Personal life and death ==
Lee married Gary Tse Shing-chun, a staff member of the Hong Kong College of Technology, in 2018. She had a son from a previous marriage.

Lee died at Pok Oi Hospital on 16 December 2020. She preliminarily tested positive for COVID-19 during the COVID-19 pandemic in Hong Kong before her death.
