= Formosan Association for Public Affairs =

Advocacy group for Taiwan independence

- Official logo of FAPA
- Formation: February 14, 1982; 44 years ago Los Angeles, California, U.S.
- Headquarters: Washington, D.C., U.S.
- President: Su-Mei Kao
- Website: fapa.org

Formosan Association for Public Affairs
- Traditional Chinese: 臺灣人公共事務會
- Simplified Chinese: 台湾人公共事务会
Transcriptions
Standard Mandarin
- Hanyu Pinyin: Táiwānrén Gōng'gòng Shìwùhùi
Southern Min
- Hokkien POJ: Tâi-oân-lâng Kong-kiōng Sū-bū-hōe

The Formosan Association for Public Affairs (FAPA; traditional Chinese: 台灣人公共事務會; simplified Chinese: 台湾人公共事务会) is a Washington, D.C.–based nonprofit organization that seeks to build worldwide support for Taiwan independence. Its name "Formosan" refers to Taiwan's historical name of "Formosa", and its 44 chapters' purported mission is to strengthen U.S.-Taiwan Relations based on the values of freedom, democracy and human rights.

== Goals ==
According to FAPA, its goals are:

- Promote international support for the right of the people of Taiwan to establish an independent and democratic sovereign state, and to join the international community.
- Advance the rights and interests of Taiwanese communities throughout the world.
- Promote peace and security for Taiwan.
- To promote relations and cooperation between Taiwan and the United States.
- To protect the right of self-determination for the people of Taiwan.

== FAPA Young Professional Group ==
FAPA Young Professional Group is an affiliate organization primarily targeted at second-generation Taiwanese-Americans who are generally in their 20s and 30s. Their goals, which parallel those of FAPA, additionally include "provid[ing] young proponents of Taiwan with the knowledge and skills necessary for grassroots advocacy on Taiwan's behalf".
