= List of Taiwanese musicians =

The following is a list of Taiwanese musicians sorted in alphabetical order by surname:

== C ==
- Sissey Chao
- Sandee Chan, singer and song-writer
- Chang Chen-yue, rock musician
- Chang Fu-hsing (musician), violinist
- Julie Chang, pianist and flutist
- Chen Da, singer
- Felix Chen, conductor and violinist
- Heinz Chen, pianist
- Jason Chen (singer), pop singer
- Ray Chen, Taiwanese-Australian violinist
- Chen Su-Ti, composer
- Chen Pi-hsien, classical pianist
- Shih-Hui Chen, composer
- Tzu-yi Chen, pianist
- Ch'eng Mao-yün, violinist and composer
- Enno Cheng, indie singer
- Chiang Wen-yeh, composer
- Sansan Chien, composer
- Gordon Shi-Wen Chin, composer and conductor
- Andrew Chou, DJ and songwriter
- Chu Ting-shun, folk musician

== D ==
- Dwagie, rapper

== E ==
- Kenjiro Ezaki, composer

== F ==
- James Fei, composer

== G ==
- GorDoN, hip-hop singer

== H ==
- Daniel Hong, rapper
- Tyzen Hsiao, composer
- Kessier Hsu, guitarist and composer
- Hsu Tsang-Houei, music editor
- Hsueh Shih-ling, singer, rapper and songwriter
- Ching-Yun Hu, pianist
- Stanley Huang, singer
- Wayne Huang, pop singer
- Hush (singer), singer and songwriter

== K ==
- Ko Fan-long, composer
- Carolyn Kuan, conductor

== L ==
- Chihchun Chi-sun Lee, composer
- Shu-De Li, conductor
- Li Tai-hsiang, composer
- Simon Lian, singer
- Liang Tsai-Ping, guzheng player
- Lin Cho-liang, violinist
- Jenny Lin, pianist
- Sam Lin, singer
- Steven Lin, classical pianist
- Ivan Linn, music programmer
- Freddy Lim, vocalist and Hena player
- Liu Shueh-shuan, composer
- Jerry Lo, DJ and songwriter
- Lo Ta-yu, rock musician
- Chia-Hui Lu, classical pianist
- Lu Hung-chih, heavy metal musician
- Lu Yen, composer
- Peiju Lin, songwriter and music producer

== M ==
- Evan Ma, rapper
- Ma Shui-long, composer
- Henry Mazer, conductor
- MC HotDog, rapper
- Ming Jie, singer
- Miss Ko, singer and songwriter
- Monster (musician), rock guitarist

== O ==
- OSN (rapper), rapper
- Ouyang Nana, cellist, actress

== P ==
- Pan Mei-chen, singer and songwriter
- Pan Shiji, composer
- Will Pan, singer and rapper
- Julia Peng, singer

== S ==
- Shuhua, K-pop singer
- Yuhan Su, jazz vibraphonist

== T ==
- Trout Fresh, rapper
- Yu-Chien Tseng, violinist
- Tzuyu, K-pop singer

== W ==
- Riley Wang, singer and DJ
- Wen Yi-jen, conductor
- Wu Bai, rock singer
- Ching-Lien Wu, conductor
- Wu Chu-chu

== Y ==
- Ed Yen, executive producer
- Ian Yi, singer and rapper
- Ying Wei-min, singer

== Z ==
- Zhuang Jin-Cai, traditional theatre musician

== See also ==
- Taiwanese music
- List of Taiwanese people
