= Bunya =

Bunya may refer to:

== Places ==
- Bunya, Queensland, Australia, a locality in the Moreton Bay Region
- Bunya Mountains, a mountain range in Queensland, Australia
- Bunya, Namibia, a village
- Bunya, the Hungarian name for the Romanian village of Bunea Mare, Făget
- Chiefdom of Bunya, a chiefdom of the kingdom of Busoga in Uganda

== People ==
- Fun'ya no Asayasu or Bunya no Asayusa, 9th and 10th century Japanese poet
- Chiang Wen-yeh (1910–1983), known as Koh Bunya in the West, Taiwanese composer
- Lydie Dooh Bunya (born 1933), Paris-based Cameroonian journalist, writer and feminist

== Other uses ==
- Bunya Highway, a state highway of Queensland, Australia
- Bunya Productions, an Australian film production company

== See also ==
- Bunya pine or Araucaria bidwillii, a native Australian tree
- Bunya sunskink or Lampropholis colossus, a species of Australian skink
- The Bunyas, a heritage-listed residence and former church missionary and scout headquarters in Sydney, New South Wales, Australia
- Bunia, the capital city of Ituri Province in the Democratic Republic of the Congo
- Boondi, an Indian dessert called Buniya in Nepali
