= History of Taiwanese historiography =

Taiwanese historiography

History of Taiwanese historiography can be traced back to various historical works and research findings from the Qing dynasty to the Japanese colonial period, with reference to the time of regime change, the final war date of 15 August 1945 was used as a dividing line to define the pre-war and post-war periods.

== Pre-World War II ==
=== Traditional Chinese historiographical concepts ===
Prior to the Japanese colonial period, the histories of Taiwan were written by Taiwanese in the traditional Chinese historiographical style, mostly continuing the Qing government's habit of compiling the local chronicles, but after the cession of Taiwan in the Yi-Wei, these Taiwanese literati turned to a Taiwan-based writing structure, of which Lian Heng's General History of Taiwan is an example.

=== Japanese colonial period ===
The tradition of colonial studies during the period of Japanese rule can be divided into the early, middle and later periods. The early period was mainly about survey reports on the whole island of Taiwan, setting a milestone in writing Taiwanese history, for example, Taketoshi and Saburo's Journal of the Ruling of Taiwan (1905) and Goto Shinpei's investigation of old habits; The middle period focused on the compilation of Taiwan's historical materials, such as: 1922 Taiwan Historical Manuscript by the Taiwan Governor's Office Historical Compilation Committee, and Yi Nengjia's Cultural Journal of Taiwan;The later period focused on the study of Taiwan's history and folklore, represented by the magazine Folklore Taiwan.

Following the establishment of Taihoku Imperial University in 1928, Murakami Naoshirō, a Japanese student of Léon van der Loon (Rees), collaborated with Professors Izukawa Shinozō and Seiichi Iwao on studies related to Dutch-Japanese relations and Japan’s overseas diplomacy in the late medieval period. Their research extended to Taiwan under Dutch rule, focusing particularly on the external dynamics of East Asian trade and diplomacy, as well as the missionary activities carried out by the Dutch and Spanish on the island. However, systematic and in-depth research on the internal history of Taiwan during the Dutch colonial period truly began with Murakami’s student at Taihoku Imperial University, Nakamura Takashi, and later, in the postwar period, with Seiichi Iwao’s disciple Tsao Yung-ho.

=== German research ===
Ludwig Rieß, a German historian specializing in Japan studies (who taught at University of Tokyo), authored the work Geschichte der Insel Formosa based on Dutch archives. Originally published in German in April 1897 in Volume 6, Issue 59 of the Journal of the German Society for Natural and Ethnological Studies of East Asia in Tokyo, the book is regarded as a milestone in academic historiography on Taiwan Island. Written from a Western perspective, it examines Taiwan through several colonial and migration regimes. The author views the Malays, Dutch, Spanish, Qing, and Japanese as foreign powers and considers the Zheng Jing era as a period of ‘independent statehood’ for Taiwan. In 1898, Yoshikuni Fujikichi translated the work into Japanese, and later Zhou Xuepu translated it from German into Chinese as Taiwan Island History, which was included in the Taiwan Economic History, Volume 3, published in 1956 by the Taiwan Bank Economic Research Office.

German historian, anthropologist, and linguist Albrecht Wirth (who once taught at the University of Chicago and the Technical University of Munich) consulted a wide range of materials and documents to publish a concise yet detailed monograph on the history and geography of Taiwan titled Geschichte Formosa’s bis Anfang in Bonn in 1898.

== Post-World War II ==
=== From 'Chinese local history' to Taiwanese history ===
After World War II, the government of the Republic of China took over Taiwan, and officially set up the Taiwan Provincial Documentation Society to preside over the revision project and compile the 'General History of Taiwan Province'. As a result, the history of Taiwan was treated as part of the 'local history of China' in the 1960s; in addition, European and American scholars also regarded Taiwan as a laboratory to study China and made Taiwan the object of regional studies; overseas opposition campaigners also wrote the history of Taiwan as a means of uniting Taiwan's consciousness; while local scholars devoted to the study of Taiwanese folklore and monuments. After the 1970s, the Republic of China withdrew from the United Nations, Taiwan-based historical research gradually emerged in the historiography, such as the Ben-Yuan Lin's Culture and Education Foundation, which greatly funded Taiwan studies; and the officially Taiwan Historical Traces and Sources Research Association was established. In 1981, the Council for Cultural Affairs was established officially to promote antiquities administration, it also deepened the study of Taiwan's history when designating monuments; the Council for Cultural Affairs also established cultural center (later upgraded to bureau) in each county and city to strengthen the study of local history; since then, historical site surveys and oral histories accumulated gradually, and then expanded to "villages" as revision units; adding aborigines (including the Pingpu ethnic group).

In 1986, Taiwan's strictures were lifted, the history of Taiwan course in the college was changed from elective to compulsory, giving rise to the 'Taiwan History Program'. PhD and MA theses in history also included works on Taiwanese history, accounting for around 30-40% so far. In 1988, the Taiwan History Field Studio, the predecessor of Taiwan History Institute at Academia Sinica, was established by the suggestion of academician Kwang-chih Chang in the mid-1980s, with the study of the Pingpu ethnic as one of main projects in the early stages. The Pingpu ethnic group of the South Island ethnic group were the masters of Taiwan before the arrival of the Han Chinese, and the study of Taiwanese history shall begin with the Pingpu ethnic group at the latest. However, in the 20th century, especially after the World War II, the Pingpu ethnic group 'disappeared', which is why Mr Kwang-chih Chang's 'Inaugural Address' for the Taiwan History Field Studies Newsletter says that the opening of the Field Studio is of great symbolic importance. While this research orientation was related to the localization movement at that time. In 2004, Taiwan History Institute at Academia Sinica, the Graduate Institute of Taiwan History at National Chengchi University, and the Institute of Taiwan History at National Taiwan Normal University were established to set up a major town for academic research on Taiwan history. Besides, the publication and digitization of a large number of historical materials, the compilation of tools and cross-border research made the study of Taiwan history reach its peak

=== The study of Taiwanese history by Western scholars ===
Apart from William Campbell's Formosa Under the Dutch and James Davidson's The Island of Formosa in 1903, most Western scholars came to Taiwan, Hong Kong, Macao and Thailand in the late 1960s for research in Chinese communities. Related organizations are: Taiwan Study Group of the association of Asian studies, Harvard-Yenching Institute, etc. Among them, the Utah Genealogical Society was dedicated to genealogical research in Taiwan and elsewhere, and compiled ancient folk documents collected as "Ancient Documents in Public and Private Collections in Taiwan" (5,691 items) with the help of Wang Shih-ching; In the 1970s, many masterpieces on Taiwan's history were published, and Kwang-chih Chang, the US-based archaeologist, hosted collaborative research projects on science and technology, such as the "Research Project on the Natural and Cultural History of the Turbid Great Basin" and the "Regional Research Project on China's Modernization" in the Institute of Modern History. While nurturing new talent for Taiwan history research, the "aboriginalization" and "interiorization" proposed by Li Guoqi and others also became important topics in Taiwanese history in the 1980s, opening up new issues on the structure of urban-rural and urban settlement systems in Taiwan.

=== From school of thought to dangerous school ===
The history of Taiwan in the post-war period, in the government's anti-communist restoration ideology in the early post-war period, Taiwan was built as ' anti-communist restoration base', only living for the Republic of China, hence the focus of official education was on Chinese history. Taiwanese had rather limited resources to study Taiwanese history. After the war, Yang Yun-ping advocated Taiwanese history, and it was not until 1983 that the first doctoral dissertation in Taiwanese history was published in the Institute of History in Taiwan. Between 1993 and 2004, the study of Taiwanese history moved towards school of thought, with forty percent of doctoral dissertations in history being on Taiwanese history. However, Chinese Taiwan Literature Collection and the Archives of Taiwan Studies in Collections surpassed the Taiwan Literature Series, which numbered in the hundreds of volumes in Taiwan; In addition to the task-based research on Taiwan history at Xiamen University, the Institute of Modern History of the Chinese Academy of Social Sciences, Nanjing and Wuhan, as well as the rapid training of students at Graduate Institute for Taiwan Studies of Xiamen University, there was a tendency to close in on local research on Taiwan history. In contrast, there are only two Taiwan History Institutes and no departments, so Taiwan history is in a dangerous school.

=== Scholarship of Ts'ao Yung-ho ===
Ts'ao Yung-ho was a distinguished scholar of early Taiwanese history, widely recognized as an authority on the periods of Dutch Formosa and the Kingdom of Tungning. His deep grounding in Southeast Asian and world history enabled him to develop a broad, large-scale historical perspective known as the "Pan-Pacific historical view."

Ts'ao Yung-ho believed that history is formed through the dynamic interplay of three elements: people, time, and space—with “space” being the fundamental setting for human life and activity. On this shared stage of coexistence among multiple ethnic groups, various figures appear and disappear across different historical periods, resulting in the continual, phased evolution of history. He argued that historical studies of Taiwan had long focused too heavily on Han-centric perspectives and political transitions, without truly recognizing that “the island of Taiwan itself is an independent stage of history.” He emphasized that history must be connected to the land, and thus proposed the concept of a “History of the Island of Taiwan” to frame a more thematic and grounded approach to historical research. “No matter how the historical context changes,” he asserted, “for those who live in Taiwan, their connection to the island always remains.”

== Legacy of historiographical reforms ==
The Taiwan National Museum of History follows a perspective centered on “all the people of Taiwan,” distinguishing itself from traditional historical narratives that often focus on a select few. Its interpretation of Taiwan’s history adopts a locally grounded, Taiwan-centered standpoint, rejecting Sinocentric frontier discourses tied to the Chinese empire. It avoids repeating the pitfalls of Han-centric or ruler-dominated viewpoints, instead reflecting the multiple dimensions of Taiwan’s social structure and embracing the diverse voices within historical knowledge.
