= Tien Tsai-ting =

Taiwanese politician and media executive

Tien Tsai-ting (Chinese: 田再庭; born 1930) is a Taiwanese politician and media executive.

== Career ==
Tien was elected to a Taichung County seat within the Legislative Yuan in 1989. Following an October 1992 demonstration led by the Action Alliance for One Taiwan, One China, it was noted by Taiwan Communiqué that Tien Tsai-ting and fellow Democratic Progressive Party legislators Hung Chi-chang, Lee Ching-hsiung, Lu Hsiu-yi, and Tai Chen-yao questioned premier Hau Pei-tsun about the One China, One Taiwan concept and discussed a purported rift between Hau and president Lee Teng-hui. After leaving the legislature upon the end of his term in 1993, Tien advocated for media rights in Taiwan. In March 1995, Tien, Chang Chun-hung, Chai Trong-rong, and Yu Chen Yueh-ying attended a luncheon hosted by the Formosan Association for Public Affairs in Washington, D.C., where they called for US Congresspeople to ask the ruling Kuomintang government in Taiwan to grant a fourth television broadcast license to Formosa Television, representing the political opposition. Tien became a member of the Taiwan Independence Party, and served as vice chairman of Formosa Television. During the 1998 legislative elections, he sought a seat from Taichung County on behalf of the Taiwan Independence Party. He won 1% of the vote, and was not seated. In 2003, Tien replaced Chai Trong-rong as chairman of Formosa Television. After Kuo Pei-hung assumed the chairmanship, Tien became an honorary director of Formosa Television. In this role, Tien expressed opposition to the April 2019 vote that named Wang Ming-yu Kuo's successor.
