= Beigang International Music Festival =

Chinese music festival

Beigang International Music Festival 北港國際音樂文化藝術節
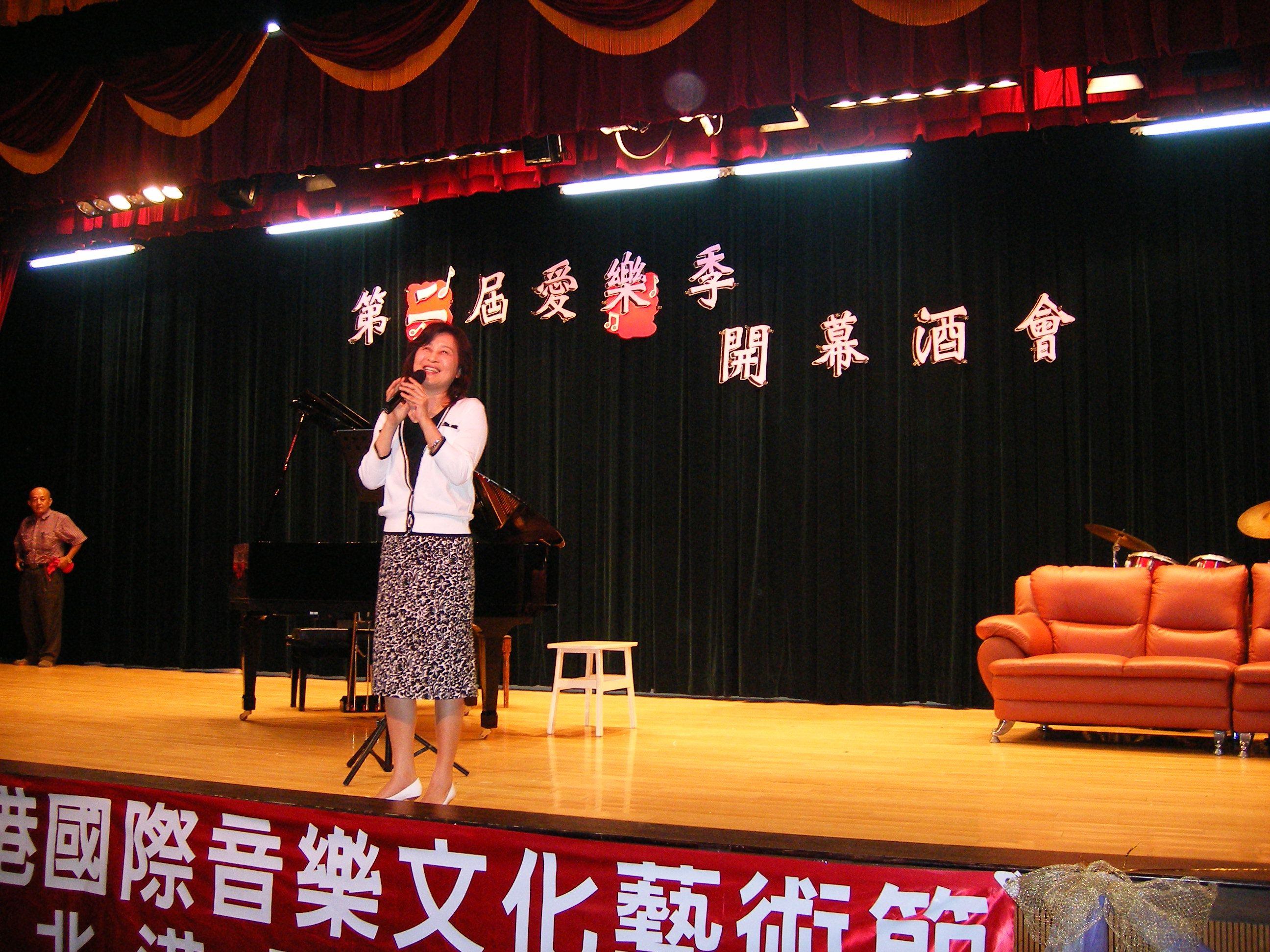
- Yunlin County Magistrate Su Chih-fen in the opening ceremony of the first Beigang International Music Festival in 2006
- Locations: Beigang, Yunlin, Taiwan
- Years active: 2006–present

The Beigang International Music Festival (Chinese: 北港國際音樂文化藝術節; pinyin: Běigǎng Guójì Yīnyuè Wénhuà Yìshù Jié) is a project of the Beigang Philharmonic Association (Chinese: 雲林縣北港愛樂協會) and takes place in Beigang, Yunlin County, Taiwan. Since its inception in 2006, the festival has grown and developed to become the biggest international music festival in Yunlin County. The festival has a series of concerts, mostly wind music (for solo, chamber music and wind band), and an educational program within the Chia-Hu Conservatory (Chinese: 陳家湖音樂學院). The festival also organizes an intercultural program for musicians from different countries. The artistic director of the Beigang International Music Festival is the pianist Heinz Chen.

== Beigang ==
Beigang (北港鎮) is known for the Chaotian Temple, which is one of the most important temples for Mazu, the goddess. Because the cultural scene in Beigang is generally active only on holy days, the Beigang Philharmonic Association has dedicated itself to improving Beigang's music education and performance sector. Most of the festival activities take place in the centre of Beigang.

== History ==
In 2005, the Beigang Philharmonic Association organized the first Beigang Music Festival, featuring performances by the Beigang Wind Orchestra and pupils of the Chia-Hu Conservatory in Beigang. In 2006, Heinz Chen was appointed the artistic director of the festival and assigned to raise the festival to an international level. Thus, the Beigang International Music Festival was created. The festival has since become very popular amongst local audiences, media and politicians. Every year, since 2005, County Governor Su Chih-fen has visited the festival, among other politicians. In 2007, the festival welcomed the rector of Hochschule für Musik Detmold, Martin Christian Vogel.

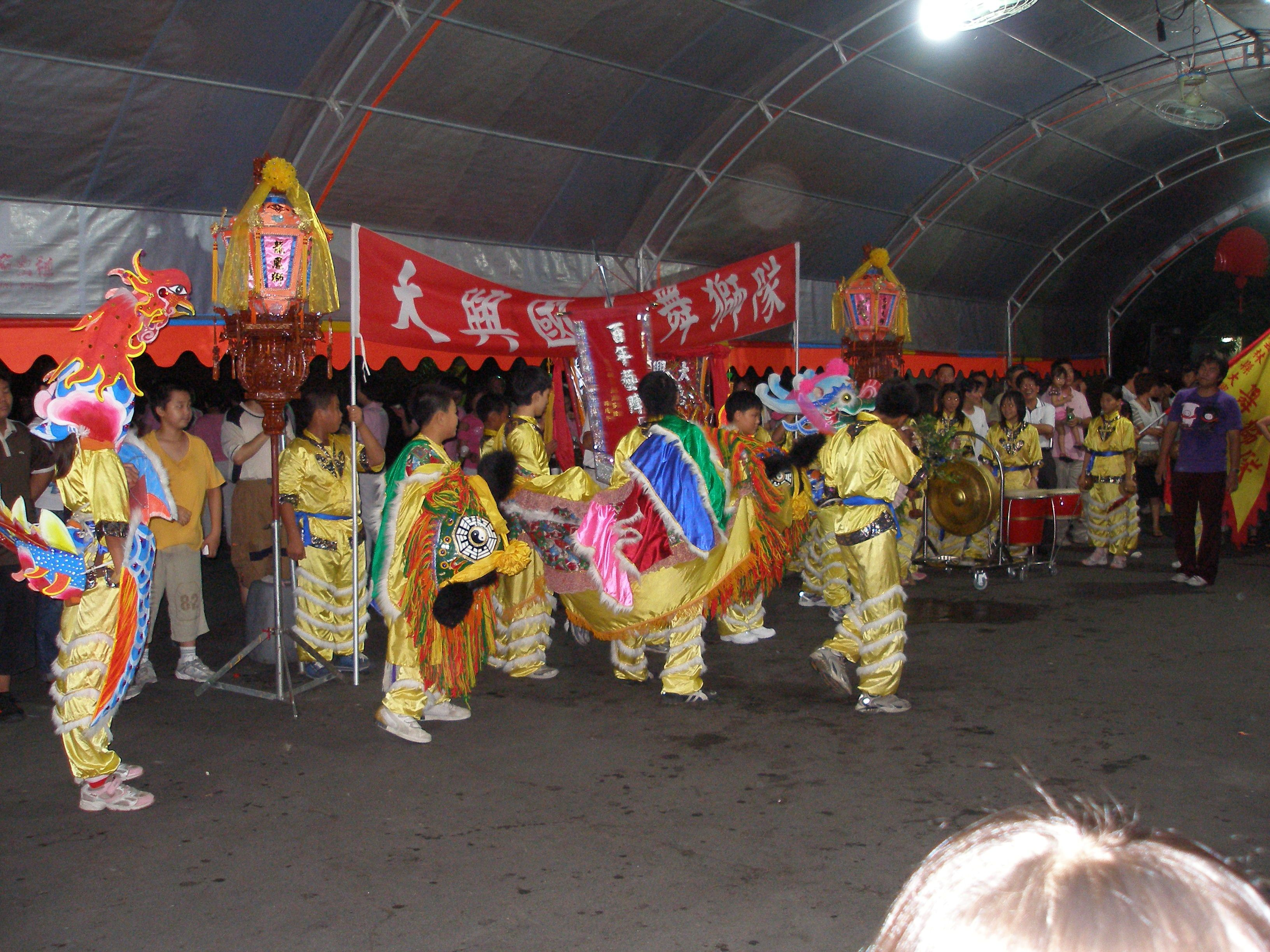
Lion dance at the Cultural Interaction Night, 2007

== Concept ==
Most of the concerts take place in Beigang. In addition, there are performances in Douliu City and Sinying City. These events are held with art music (the so-called classical music) but there are several performances with light music, for example the open-air concert Cultural Interaction Night. The performance in a local restaurant, Club Concert, have also been very popular.

The festival aims to develop strong intercultural exchanges between musicians from different countries. It also promotes music for children and audiences who are dedicated to experiencing a wealth of classical and related music types. For this reason, a tutorial project takes place, in which the international performers share their knowledge with pupils from Beigang.

The concerts and the educational program are free of charge to visitors. The festival's organisers want to share music with all who are interested, as it is an outreach organisation and wishes to reach all sectors of the population.

== Sponsors ==
The Beigang International Music Festival is supported by the Beigang Township, Yunlin County and the cultural department of the national government in Taipei. Music companies like Jupiter and Kawai, as well as the Chaotian Temple and many local companies and private sponsors are helping to finance the festival. In 2009 the Beigang International Music Festival received support from the Sibelius Academy, Finland.

== Musicians ==
The following musicians have been invited since 2006:

- Lauri Bruins, Netherlands, clarinet
- Anita Farkas, Hungary, flute
- Paz Aparicio García, Spain, saxophone
- Noémi Győri, Hungary, flute
- Wilfried Stefan Hanslmeier, Germany, trombone
- Philipp Hutter, Switzerland, trumpet
- Christina Jacobs, Germany, saxophone
- Anniina Karjalainen, Finland, trumpet
- Sofia Kayaya, Denmark, flute
- Mizuho Kojima, Japan, trombone and euphonium
- Zoltán Kövér, Hungary, trumpet
- Anna Krauja, Latvia, soprano
- Paavo Maijala, Finland, piano
- Lauri Sallinen, Finland, clarinet
- Juuso Wallin, Finland, French horn, festival orchestra conductor

== Beigang Philharmonic Association ==
The main organizer of the festival is the Beigang Philharmonic Association. Its members work free of charge and on a volunteer basis.
