= Chen Chung-hsin =

Taiwanese journalist, editor, and politician

Chen Chung-hsin MLY
- 陳忠信
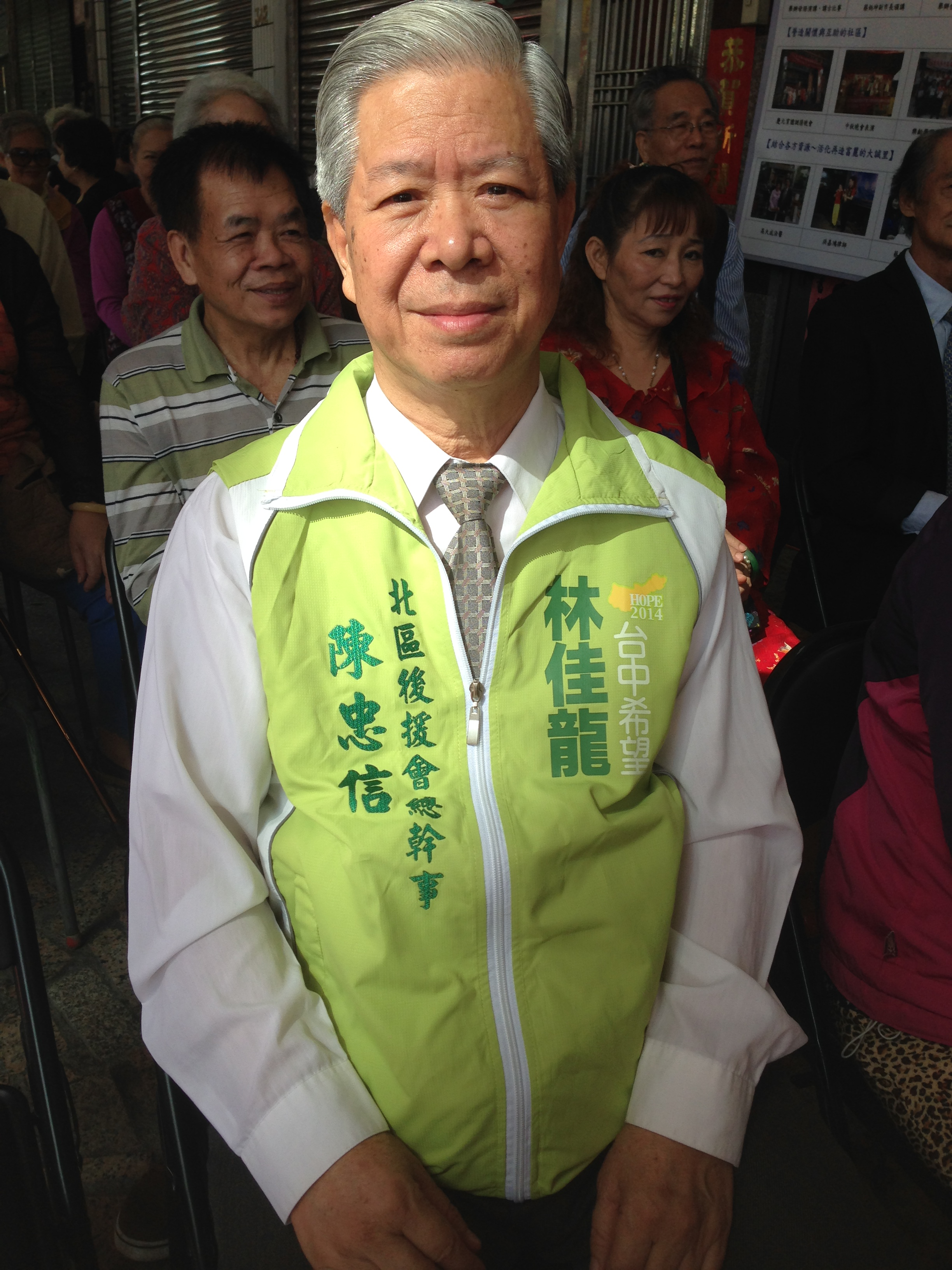
- Chen Chung-hsin campaigning for Lin Chia-lung in November 2014

Secretary-General of National Security Council
- In office 27 March 2008 – 20 May 2008
- Preceded by: Chiou I-jen
- Succeeded by: Su Chi

Member of the Legislative Yuan
- In office 1 February 1999 – 31 May 2004
- Constituency: Party list
- Succeeded by: Su Chia-fu

Personal details
- Born: 15 April 1949 (age 76)
- Party: Democratic Progressive Party
- Education: Tunghai University (BS)
- Profession: Journalist

Chen Chung-hsin (Chinese: 陳忠信; Pe̍h-ōe-jī: Tân Tiong-sìn; born 15 April 1949) is a Taiwanese journalist, editor, and politician.

== Education and career ==
Chen studied mathematics at Tunghai University and began his career in journalism, serving as a writer for the Independence Daily Post for eight years, as well as editor of Formosa Magazine and Taiwan Social Research Quarterly. Chen adopted the pen name Hangzhi (杭之). His association with the tangwai-affiliated Formosa Magazine forced him to go on the run in the aftermath of the Kaohsiung Incident.

Chen was twice elected to the Legislative Yuan via party list proportional representation as a member of the Democratic Progressive Party. As a legislator, Chen jointly proposed an amendment to the Criminal Prosecution Law in October 2000, alongside Chiu Tai-san and Lee Ching-hsiung, regarding the use of search warrants. In February 2002, Chen attended a press conference with You Ching and Chen Sheng-hung, in support of Lin Chin-hsing's opposition to a proposed increase for National Health Insurance premiums. During his legislative tenure, Chen was a member of the defense committee.

While serving as a legislator, Chen was appointed head of the Democratic Progressive Party's Chinese Affairs Department in July 2002. Compared to senior DPP leaders at the time, Chen's views on Cross-Strait relations were considered more favorable to China. The next month, Chen Chung-hsin reiterated the Chen Shui-bian presidential administration's adherence to the Four Noes and One Without. Chen Chung-hsin had planned to commemorate the National Day of the Republic of China in Hong Kong, but turned his visa application in late and was unable to participate. In January 2003, he visited China for the first time since taking on his party position. In December of that year, Chen discussed Kuomintang chairman Lien Chan's endorsement of Chen Shui-bian's One Country on Each Side, stating that Lien had previously criticized the concept and called on Lien to explain his party's views on Cross-Strait ties. In April 2004, Chen Chung-hsin was considered a candidate to replace Tsai Ing-wen as head of the Mainland Affairs Council. The position went to Joseph Wu, and Chen instead became deputy and acting secretary-general of the National Security Council. After leaving public service, Chen has commented on aspects of Taiwanese identity, Ma Ying-jeou's actions regarding Cross-Strait relations, and Taiwan's place within the one China principle.
