= Lee Ching-hsiung =

Taiwanese politician and lawyer (born 1938)

- 李慶雄

Member of the Examination Yuan
- In office 1 September 2002 – 31 August 2008

Member of the Legislative Yuan
- In office 1 February 1999 – 31 January 2002
- Constituency: Kaohsiung North
- In office 1 February 1990 – 31 January 1996
- Constituency: Kaohsiung North

Personal details
- Born: 17 March 1938 (age 88)
- Party: Democratic Progressive Party
- Other political affiliations: Taiwan Independence Party
- Education: National Taiwan University (LLB, LLM)

Lee Ching-hsiung (Chinese: 李慶雄; born 17 March 1938) is a Taiwanese politician and lawyer . He was a member of the Legislative Yuan from 1990 to 1996, and again from 1999 to 2002. Lee then served on the Examination Yuan between 2002 and 2008.

== Education and legal career ==
Lee earned a bachelor's and master's degree in law at National Taiwan University. He practiced law as a lawyer, district attorney and judge.

== Political career ==
Lee was first elected to the Legislative Yuan in December 1989 as a supplemental legislator from Kaohsiung. Shortly after taking office, he joined 25 others in signing the instrument of appeal for Judicial Yuan Interpretation No. 261, which ruled on the extended tenure of the First Legislative Yuan, a legislative body first elected in 1948, when the government of the Republic of China still maintained control over mainland China. Following an October 1992 demonstration led by the Action Alliance for One Taiwan, One China, it was noted by Taiwan Communiqué that Lee Ching-hsiung and fellow Democratic Progressive Party legislators Hung Chi-chang, Lu Hsiu-yi, Tai Chen-yao, and Tien Tsai-ting questioned premier Hau Pei-tsun about the One China, One Taiwan concept and discussed a purported rift between Hau and president Lee Teng-hui. Lee was ranked ninth on a list of ten outstanding legislators compiled by the Taipei Society in December 1992, shortly before all members of the First Legislative Yuan were to leave office. In his reelection bid that same month, Lee was again nominated by the Democratic Progressive Party. He received the most votes of any candidate in his district, Kaohsiung North.

During the 1995 election cycle, Lee was voted out of office. Lee returned to the Legislative Yuan in 1996 by winning his old seat, this time on behalf of the Taiwan Independence Party. In his time on the Fourth Legislative Yuan, Lee was a member of the legislative defense committee. In a legislative capacity, Lee visited defense minister Tang Fei to discuss Tang's willingness to remain on the Executive Yuan after president Chen Shui-bian took office, questioned Tang Yao-ming about the military equipment budget, and jointly proposed revisions to the Criminal Prosecution Law alongside Chiu Tai-san and Chen Chung-hsin. During a session of the Legislative Yuan that began in September 2000, Lee contested an internal election to lead its judiciary committee.

After leaving the Legislative Yuan, Lee accepted a nomination from the Chen Shui-bian presidential administration to serve on the Examination Yuan. A legislative confirmation hearing was held in June 2002, and Lee was installed within the Examination Yuan as a minister without portfolio in September 2002. While a member of the Examination Yuan, Lee commented on pensions and interest rates for public sector employees, and advocated for the grading system used to evaluate public servants to become stricter.

=== Political stances and commentary ===
Lee advocated for a balance of power between government branches and cautioned against abuses of power, such as legislative immunity. He has also discussed balances of power within the judiciary. Lee was supportive of amendments to the Code of Criminal Procedure discussed in 2001 to limit the role of judges and give more powers to prosecutors. However, he opposed a legislative resolution that required prosecutors general to attend legislative interpellation session, because individual lawmakers could influence the judiciary if legislative questioning turned to specific cases.

A number of editorials written by Lee have been published in the Taipei Times. His columns have included electoral analysis of the 2000 presidential election as well as the 2001 local and legislative elections and its resulting minority government. His editorials have also addressed national security, cross-strait relations, and electoral reform.

Lee has also opined on political processes and tools, such as opinion polls, party switching, on Lo Fu-chu's 2001 attack on Diane Lee, and Fu Kun-chi's 2009 divorce from Hsu Chen-wei, after which Hsu was appointed deputy magistrate of Hualien under Fu.
