= David Chou (disambiguation) =

David Chou (born 1954) is a Taiwanese politician who was convicted of bribery in 2003.

The name may also refer to:

- David Wenwei Chou (born 1953), Taiwanese-American accused of the 2022 Laguna Woods shooting
- David Chou Hock Heng (c. 1937–1975), participant in the Gold Bars triple murders
