= Matip =

Matip is a surname. Notable people with the surname include:

- Joël Matip (born 1991), Cameroonian footballer
- Marie-Claire Matip (born 1938), Cameroonian writer
- Marvin Matip (born 1985), German-born Cameroonian footballer
