= Lin Qiu-Jin =

Taiwanese singer and music educator (1909-2000)

Lin Qiu-Jin (Chinese: 林秋錦; November 1, 1909 – February 8, 2000) was a Taiwanese soprano and music educator. She taught at various institutions, including Chang Jung Girls' High School (later renamed Private Chang Jung Girls' Senior High School), the Music Department of Taiwan Provincial Teachers College (later renamed National Taiwan Normal University), and Tainan College of Home Economics (later renamed Tainan University of Technology) for 50 years in total. She founded Chang Jung Girls' High School Chorus and the Taipei Research Association of Vocal Artists.

== Biography ==
Lin Qiu-Jin was born in Tainan to Christian missionaries Lin Yu-Chi and Yen Feng-I. She was inspired by church music from an early age and became determined to become a soprano. In 1922, she enrolled in Chang Jung Girls' High School, a school founded by the Tainan Presbyterian Church, where she studied singing. In 1929, she was admitted to Nihon Ongaku Gakko (now known as the Ariake College of Education and the Arts), majoring in vocal music and minoring in piano. In 1933, she was recommended by the school to perform at a music concert for young artists organized by the newspaper publication Yomiuri Shimbun. After graduation, she returned to Taiwan and became the head of the music department at Private Chang Jung Girls' Senior High School, where she founded the chorus.

In 1934, she formed the Hometown-visit Music Group with other Taiwanese students studying in Japan, including Chiang Wen-yeh, Chen Su-Ti, Kao Tzu-mei, and Lee Chin-tu. They organized a seven-concert tour in Taiwan called the Hometown-visit Music Concert, and the following year they participated in the Earthquake Relief Charity Concert, performing 37 concerts throughout Taiwan. In addition to fundraising for charity, they also promoted the appreciation and study of Western music.

In 1946, Lin Qiu-Jin became the chorus director and featured soloist of the National Taiwan Symphony Orchestra, and toured throughout Taiwan with the orchestra. In 1948, Lin founded the Taipei Research Association of Vocal Artists. In 1951, Lin joined the Music Department at Taiwan Provincial Normal College as a faculty member and frequently performed in concerts, for example with violinist Dai Cui-Lun and pianist Zhang Cai-Xiang. From 1977 to 1982, she taught at Tainan College of Home Economics and was the head of the music department. Lin also taught at Tamkang Senior High School, Fu Hsing Kang College (later renamed Fu Hsing Kang College, National Defense University), and Chinese Culture College (later renamed Chinese Culture University). Her students at National Taiwan Normal University included vocalists Tung Lan-fen, Chen Ming-lu, Chin Ching-yun, Liu Se-yun, Yang Tung-chun, Ren Rong, Lee Ching-Mei and Fan Yu-wen. Shen Hsueh-yung, the former chairman of the Council for Cultural Affairs (later renamed Ministry of Culture) also received vocal instruction from Lin. After retiring in 1983, Lin continued to conduct social education in music throughout Taiwan.

She was hospitalized for heart disease in 1999 and died on February 8, 2000, at the Kaohsiung Municipal Min-Sheng Hospital. Posthumously, Lin was honored with a presidential citation by the Office of the President.

== Publications ==
- Studies on Vocal Music (1963)
- A Study of the Technique of Performing Classical Italian Songs (1963)
- Music Textbooks for Junior High School, volumes 2 to 6 (1964, co-edited with Zhang Cai-Xiang)
