= A Little Lunch Music =

Auburn, Alabama music program

- Formation: 2007; 19 years ago
- Founder: Charles Wright
- Dissolved: March 12, 2020; 6 years ago
- Purpose: Musical
- Location(s): Auburn, Alabama, United States
- Key people: Patrick McCurry
- Parent organization: Auburn University

A Little Lunch Music was a weekly free-concert series hosted every Thursday at the Jule Collins Smith Museum of Fine Art in Auburn, Alabama that presented primarily classical music. The series was founded and organized by musician Charles Wright up until 2009, when high school friend and fellow musician Patrick McCurry took over as series coordinator. It was originally hosted near the Museum Café.

== History ==
Founded in 2007, the program began as a music show held every Thursday. Wright, a cellist, began the series by playing his own music. In 2008, Wright invited Patrick McCurry, who played the saxophone and flute alongside Wright. In early 2009, a Steinway Grand Piano was donated to the museum, and pianist Barbara Acker-Mills joined the duo, now known as the Woodfield Trio.

Acker-Mills moved to North Carolina, while Wright moved to Florida. This left Patrick McCurry, who took over as series coordinator. The program began attracting an average of 40 attendees, and McCurry began recruiting sponsors to pay musicians who played at the event.

During 2010, the program was held in the same space as an exhibit, "On the Silk Road and the High Seas." exhibit, from 12 pm to 1 pm.

Musicians from diverse backgrounds performed at the shows, including composer and percussionist Nathan Davis, saxophonist James Houlik, Ken Vandermark, the Attacca Quartet, which complemented the "Rembrandt, Rubens, Gainsborough, and the Golden Age of Painting in Europe" exhibition, violinist Lorna Wood, two fellows of the Montgomery Symphony Orchestra Ahrim Kim and Robin Scott, guitarist Edoardo Catemario, composer and soprano Rosephanye Powell, saxophonist Mars Williams who joined an improvised music group from Chicago, and concert pianist Tzu-yi Chen. McCurry occasionally performed alongside other musicians.

On 12 March 2020, the last concert was performed by pianist Beibei Lin.
