= Su Chia-fu =

Taiwanese politician

Su Chia-fu (Chinese: 蘇嘉富; pinyin: Sū Jiāfù) is a Taiwanese politician.

Su was elected to the National Assembly in 1996. He was appointed to the Legislative Yuan on 2 June 2004 to replace Chen Chung-hsin on the Democratic Progressive Party list. Su's brothers include Su Chia-chuan and Su Chia-chyuan.
