= Chen Sheng-hung =

Taiwanese politician (born 1944)

Chen Sheng-hung MLY
- 陳勝宏

Member of the Legislative Yuan
- In office 1 February 1999 – 31 January 2005
- Constituency: Republic of China

Member of the Taipei City Council
- In office 25 December 1977 – 25 December 1998

Personal details
- Born: 5 June 1944 (age 81)
- Party: Democratic Progressive Party
- Spouse: Hsueh Ling
- Education: Feng Chia University (BA)

Chen Sheng-hung (Chinese: 陳勝宏; pinyin: Chén Shènghóng; born 5 June 1944) is a Taiwanese politician.

== Education ==
Chen graduated from Feng Chia University with a bachelor's degree in international trade.

== Political career ==
Chen served on the Taipei City Council from 1977 to 1998. In 1988, he found that seven fellow councillors and six other Taipei City Government employees had accepted bribes from Chiaofu Construction Corporation while the Ronghsing Park development project was ongoing. Legal action resulting from the scandal continued until 2003. David Chou and Chen Chun-yuan were the only former councilors convicted of bribery. Chou subsequently resigned his seat on the Legislative Yuan.

Chen Sheng-hung was placed on the Democratic Progressive Party's proportional representation ballot in 1998, and won election to the Legislative Yuan. He was reelected via party list in 2001. He was initially uninvolved with the factions of the DPP, but later led his own political faction, known as the Green Alliance, and later the Green Friendship Alliance.

The DPP issued a disciplinary statement against Chen Sheng-hung and Chang Chun-hung in 2003, when Su Hui-chen accused both politicians of accepting bribes from her. In 2004, Su accused Chen's wife Hsueh Ling of buying votes during the DPP primaries held before the 2004 legislative elections. The same allegation against Chen and Hsueh resurfaced in 2006, in the midst of a party leadership contest. The next year, the couple were charged with forgery and issuing fraudulent loans via Sunny Bank. The Shilin District Prosecutors' Office sought nine years imprisonment and a NT$10 million fine each for Chen, Hsueh, and two others. Both Chen and Hsueh were found not guilty in the first trial heard by the Shilin District Court. Upon appeal, the Taiwan High Court ruled in 2012 that Chen was to serve three years and two months in prison. The High Court reduced Chen's prison sentence to thirty months in a ruling issued in April 2018.
