= Lydie Dooh Bunya =

Cameroonian journalist and feminist

- Born: 19 February 1933; Douala, Cameroon
- Died: 27 March 2020 (aged 87)
- Occupation: Journalist

Lydie Dooh Bunya (19 February 1933 – 27 March 2020), also known by her married name Quan-Samé, was a Paris-based Cameroonian journalist, writer, and feminist.

== Early life ==
Lydie Sophie Dooh Ebenye Bunya was born in 1933 in Douala, Cameroon. Her father was a customs official, and her mother was a seamstress. After beginning her education in Cameroon, Dooh Bunya completed her secondary education in France, at an all-girls high school in Saint-Gaultier. As a university student in Paris, she first studied nursing and chemistry before settling on a literature degree, having first become interested in writing at age 17.

== Career ==
She subsequently began her career as a journalist, contributing to the French public broadcaster Office de Radiodiffusion Télévision Française and working as an editor for various journals and for the Nouvelle Agence de Presse. In 1977 she published her first novel, La Brise du jour, for which she drew upon her memories of her childhood in Cameroon. The book also served as a testimony on the feminine condition. With this literary work, she joined the first generation of women writers in sub-Saharan Africa, alongside the likes of Marie-Claire Matip. Dooh Bunya did not hesitate to apply a critical lens to social issues in her work, for example equating marriage with the selling of a deed.

Dooh Bunya was an activist in the French feminist movement, but she felt there was not enough emphasis on solving the specific problems of black women in France, and in 1981 she created the Movement for the Defense of the Rights of Black Women (MODEFEN). The movement fought against both inherited customs from some African immigrants' countries of origin, including Forced marriages, polygamy, and female genital mutilation, as well as discrimination against black women in their new country.
