= List of universities and colleges in Kraków =

Higher Education in Kraków takes place in 10 university-level institutions with about 120,000 to over 170,000 students (based on years and different data providers) and 10,000 faculty, as well as in a number of non-public colleges.

== Public institutions of higher education ==
- Jagiellonian University
- AGH University of Science and Technology
- Tadeusz Kościuszko Kraków University of Technology
- Kraków University of Economics
- Academy of Music in Kraków
- Pedagogical University of Kraków
- Agricultural University of Kraków
- Academy of Fine Arts in Kraków
- Ludwik Solski Academy for the Dramatic Arts
- University School of Physical Education in Kraków
- Pontifical University of John Paul II

== Non-public colleges ==
- SWPS University
- Tischner European University
- Jesuit University of Philosophy and Education Ignatianum
- Andrzej Frycz Modrzewski Kraków University
- Krakowska Wyższa Szkoła Promocji Zdrowia
- Małopolska Wyższa Szkoła Zawodowa
- WSB University
- Wyższa Pedagogiczna Szkoła Zawodowa im. Św. Rodziny
- Wyższa Szkoła Bezpieczeństwa Publicznego i Indywidualnego "Apeiron"
- Wyższa Szkoła Ekonomii i Informatyki w Krakowie
- Wyższa Szkoła Handlowa w Krakowie (closing)
- Wyższa Szkoła Ochrony Środowiska, Turystyki i Rekreacji
- Wyższa Szkoła Ubezpieczeń
- Wyższa Szkoła Zarządzania i Bankowości w Krakowie

== See also ==
- Culture of Kraków
- VIII Prywatne Akademickie Liceum Ogólnokształcące w Krakowie

== Notes and references ==
- Redakcja (2013). "Szkoły wyższe, uczelnie - Kraków". dlaStudenta.pl.
