= Tân Sù-tī =

Taiwanese musician

Tân Sù-tī (April 14, 1911 – September 23, 1992) was a Taiwanese composer, pianist, pastor, and educator from Shilin, Taipei. His works combine the pentatonic scale with the chromatic scale of the European Romantic period. Some of his piano works were included in Maurice Hinson's Guide to the Pianist's Repertoire (1979) and were held in the same high regard as those Western masters like Beethoven and Chopin. Lu Chuan-Sheng praised him as "The Great Man."

== Early life ==
Tân Sù-tī was born on April 14, 1911, in Sanjiaopu, Taipei. His father, Tân Èng-lîn, was a cultivated talent (Hsiutsai) during the Qing dynasty. In 1917, Tân Sù-tī was enrolled in Shezi Common School (an elementary school in Japanese Colonial Taiwan period). Later, he attended high school in Xiamen with his family, but he missed his homeland so much that he returned to Taiwan and enrolled in Tamsui Middle School in 1923. In 1924, he began studying piano and Western classical music under Margaret Mellis Gauld, also known as the "Mother of Church Music in Taiwan." Tân then joined the Glee Club, the first male choir in Taiwan, which was established and led by Chen Ching-Chung, also known as the "Father of Rugby in Taiwan." The choir had extensive experience in touring.

== Baptism and Theological Training ==
In 1928, Tân Sù-tī completed his studies at Tamsui Middle School. Tân was baptized in the Dadaocheng Presbyterian Church by Pastor Zhang Jin-Bo in 1929. He enrolled in a four-year program at the Taipei Theological College and Seminary (now known as Taiwan Theological College and Seminary) in 1930 and studied piano under Canadian missionary Isabel Taylor.

After graduating from the Seminary in 1934, Tân visited Japan and attended Japan Theological Seminary (later renamed Tokyo Union Theological Seminary) in April. He studied composition and harmony under Professor Eizaburo Kioka at Ueno Music School (later renamed Tokyo University of the Arts), and voice and conducting under Nakada Ugo. Tân also made friends with other music enthusiasts, including Jiang Wen-ye.

During Tân Sù-tī's studies in Japan, he attended some musical activities held by Taiwanese students, such as the "Hometown Visit Music Tour" proposed by Yang Chao-Chia at the first executive meeting of the Taiwan Association in Tokyo. Yang then became the leader and general organizer of the group. Kao Tien-Cheng served as the host for the program's introduction, while Hsiao Tsai-Hsing acted as the concert's emcee. Tân Sù-tī provided accompaniment, and other Taiwanese musicians, including Jiang Wen-Ye, Kao Tzu-Mei, Ke Ming-Chu, Gao Yue-Na, Lin Cheng-Mu, Lin Qiu-Jin, Lin Chin-Sheng, Weng Jung-Mao, and Li Chin-Tu, joined the event. The tour was conducted throughout the island. From August 11th to 19th, 1934, the "Hometown-visit Music Concert" was held in seven different cities, with the debut taking place in the auditorium of the Taipei Medical Professional School (later renamed National Taiwan University College of Medicine) under the administration of the Taiwan Soutokufu on the evening of August 11th. This large-scale music tour is the first fruitful achievement in promoting Western music in Taiwan.

While in Izu Peninsula in 1936, Tân Sù-tī wrote his piece, "The Lamb of God." In 1942, the "The Lamb of God" was played in the Taipei City Public Auditorium (now Zhongshan Hall). That same year Lu Chuan-Sheng performed on Taiwan Hōsō Kyōkai (JFAK), accompanied by Tân's playing.

In 1937, having completed his studies, Tân Sù-tī returned to Taiwan. Soon after, he married Liu Tammui, Pastor Liu A-Xiu's second daughter. Subsequently, Tân became a missionary at the Shilin Presbyterian Church, a role he held until 1946. Throughout this era, Tân's remained dedicated to music. In 1939, he wrote the piano suite "Taiwan Sketches" in honor of his mentor, Miss Isabel Taylor. By 1946, he served on the music committee of the Taiwan Cultural Advancement Association. The Ministry of Education also comissioned him to create the "Taiwan Restoration Memorial Song." Around 1939, Tân collaborated with other prominent people in Shilin, including Kuo Hsiu-Tsung, Tsao Yung-He, and Ho Pin to found the Shilin Association to foster cultural appreciation. However, the political tumult and prevailing climate of repression led to the association's eventual disbandment. Anticipating the 228 Incident, which took place in 1947, Tân relocated his family to Tamsui.

== Faith, Education, and Music Career ==
After moving to Tamsui, Tân Sù-tī taught in Chun-deh Girls’ High School and then became the principal in 1952. Since 1956, he had served for 25 years as the principal of Tamkang Senior High School, formed by the merger of Chun-deh Girls’ High School and Tamsui Middle School. In 1967, he was appointed as a special pastor during his tenure as principal at Tamkang Senior High School.

Tân Sù-tī kept his music career during his time in Tamsui. For example, he studied composition for a year under Professor Oskar Morawetz at the Royal Conservatory of Music in Toronto, Canada in 1957. A year later, he was commissioned by the Presbyterian Church in Taiwan Headquarter to compose psalms with Isabel Taylor and other church musicians. The following years, Tân completed his piano works, "Etude in D-flat Major," “Dragon Dance," “Deep Valley–Amis Rhapsody," “Ten Preludes─Playful Keyboard," and piano trio "Divertimento," and chorus "For God so Loved the World," “Praise the Lord for His Great Blessings," and "The Centennial Hymn for the Christian Mission in Taiwan."

== Retirement and death ==
On January 23, 1981, Tân Sù-tī retired from Tamkang Senior High School and moved to the United States. In 1990, Tân Sù-tī founded the "Orange County Christian Fellowship" in Anaheim, California. Tân Sù-tī died on September 23, 1992 and was buried in Orange County, California on September 27.
