= Heinz Chen =

Heinz Chen (born 1983 in Vienna) is a Taiwanese-Austrian pianist and pedagogue who was artistic director of the Beigang International Music Festival between 2006 and 2009. Today he lives in Berlin, Germany.

Heinz Chen studied piano playing at the University of Music and Performing Arts, Vienna with Wolfgang Watzinger, at the Sibelius Academy with Erik T. Tawaststjerna and at the Hochschule für Musik Detmold with Anatol Ugorski. He also studied composition and music theory at the University of Music and Performing Arts, Vienna. He was awarded in 2002 with the Bösendorfer-scholarship, 2006 with the first prize at the Helmi-Vesa piano competition in Helsinki and 2008 with the Special prize for his stage charm at the international piano competition in Santorini, Greece. With Austrian violinist Roland Hölzl he recorded a CD with works by Fritz Kreisler.

Heinz Chen made efforts to enrich the cultural life in Yunlin County, Taiwan, the place of origin of his family. In 2006 Heinz Chen took over the Beigang Music Festival in Beigang, Taiwan, and raised it to the Beigang International Music Festival, which he led as Artistic Director between 2006 and 2009. The concept of the festival contained arts events as well as intercultural activities, which Heinz Chen partly adopted from his experiences from the European Youth Parliament, which he attended in 1999 in Weimar and Hämeenlinna.

He has been performing with Latvian soprano Anna Krauja. Their work was documented by Latvian radio.
