= Noémi Győri =

Hungarian classical flautist

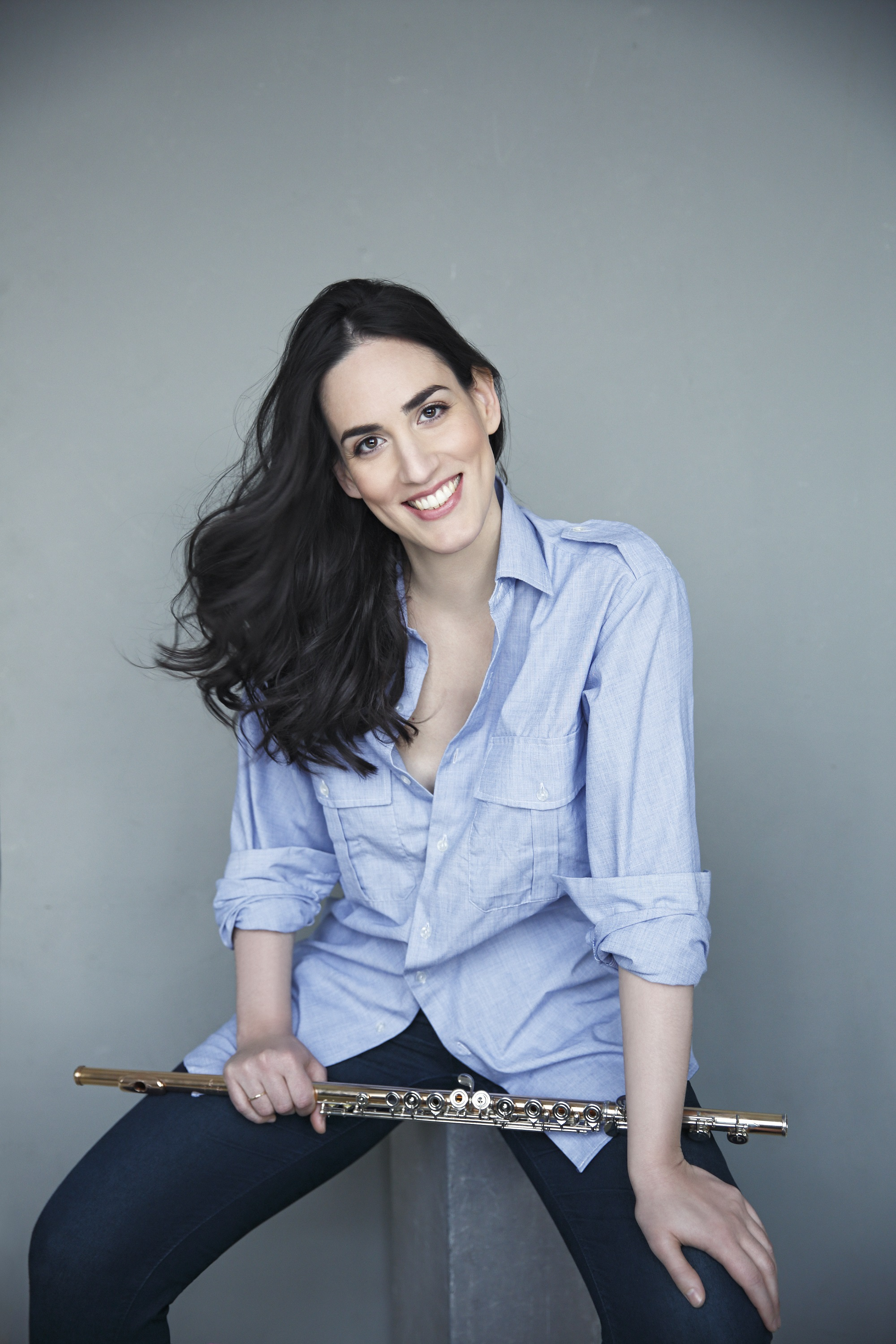
Noemi Gyori

Noémi Győri (born 1983) is a Hungarian classical flautist.

== Education ==
Győri graduated with honours from the Liszt Academy of Music in Budapest (Prof. Henrik Prőhle) in 2007 and completed post-graduate studies at the University of Music and Performing Arts in Vienna (Prof. Barbara Gisler-Haase) and at the Hochschule für Musik und Theater München (Prof. András Adorján). She has participated in the masterclasses of Aurèle Nicolet, Pierre-Yves Artaud, Marina Piccinini, Paul Meisen, William Bennett, and Michael M. Kofler and, through the Erasmus exchange programme, has spent a semester at the Sibelius Academy working with Petri Alanko.

Győri is the first flutist to hold a PhD in Flute Performance Practice from the Royal Academy of Music in London. Her thesis, "Reimagining the Flute and Guitar Duo through Musical Translations of Keyboard Works by Haydn, Mozart and Beethoven" summarizes her research and artistic work carried out as part of her Classical Flute and Guitar project.

== Performance career ==
Győri gave her Carnegie Hall debut in October 2011 as a first prize winner of the Alexander & Buono International Flute Competition and, in the same year, was awarded the European Cultural Prize for Young Artists, following in the footsteps of former laureates such as Anne-Sophie Mutter, Julia Fischer, and Sol Gabetta. In 2012, she won the Career Prize of the New York-based Salon de Virtuosi Foundation. She has also been chosen as "Annie Fischer Scholar" of the Filharmonia Budapest for three successive years, and she has been an artiste of the Hungarofest Klassz Foundation and the Yehudi Menuhin Live Music Now Foundations in Vienna and Munich. In both 2006 and 2009, she received the Performers' Prize of the Artisjus Music Foundation in Hungary for her outstanding performances of Hungarian contemporary compositions. She was co-founder and artistic director of the IKZE Contemporary Music Festival in Budapest between 2004 and 2009.

Győri has performed extensively as a soloist and chamber musician at major international festivals in 28 countries (including the Budapest Festival Academy, the Grachten Festival in Amsterdam, Midis-Minimes in Belgium, the Kuhmo Festival in Finland, the Oxford Chamber Music Festival, the Budapest Spring Festival, the Café Budapest Festival, the Saariaho Festival in den Haag, the Elisso Virsaladze Festival in Georgia, etc.). As a soloist she has worked with, amongst others, the Luxembourg Academy Chamber Orchestra, the Orchestre Dijon Bourgogne, the Chamber Orchestra of the Hungarian National Philharmonic, the Amadinda Percussion Group, the Jewish Chamber Orchestra Munich, the Georgian Sinfonietta, the Krakow Academy Orchestra, the Miskolc Symphony Orchestra, the Danube Symphony Orchestra, the Mendelssohn Chamber Orchestra, the Danubia Orchestra Obuda, the Nottingham Philharmonic Orchestra and the IKZE Ensemble.

In addition to her many individual concerts, she has played as a guest in orchestras including the BBC Philharmonic and the Vienna Philharmonic (at the Vienna State Opera, where she took part in unique projects such as the world premiere of Aribert Reimann's opera Medea). Since 2008, she is the principal flute of the Jewish Chamber Orchestra Munich, and has been the guest principal of the New European Ensemble, the Georgian Sinfonietta and the Chamber Orchestra of the Hungarian National Philharmonic.

Győri is a Miyazawa Flutes artist. She plays a 14K gold LaFin headjoint, sponsored by the Solti Foundation and a 14K gold Miyazawa Boston flute, funded by the Philip Loubser Foundation.

== Educator ==
In 2012, Győri was appointed Associate Tutor in Flute at the Royal Northern College of Music, where she also serves as International Ambassador of the RNCM and leads her own flute studio at the Junior department. She is also Flute Tutor at The University of Manchester and has given masterclasses the Royal Irish Academy of Music, the Bard College New York, the Conservatoire Dijon, the Pôle d'enseignement supérieur de la musique en Bourgogne Dijon, the Leeds College of Music, the Manchester University, the Junior Royal Academy of Music in London, the Hong Kong Academy for Performing Arts, the Busan Music and Arts Highschool South-Korea and the Béla Bartok and Weiner conservatories in Budapest. She was flute tutor at the New Millenium Chamber Music Festival, Bozsok Music Camp in Hungary, Beigang International Music Festival in Taiwan, the Artesono International Orchestra Course in Switzerland, as well as leading popular workshops for Miyazawa Flutes in Germany. Győri was invited as an Erasmus Professor to the Grieg Academy in Bergen, Norway in 2013 and served as Specialist External Examiner in Flute in 2018 at the Chetham's School of Music.

== Recordings and publications ==
Antonio Nava Flute and Guitar Duos, world premiere recording of 19th-century Milanese composer, Antonio Nava (Hungaroton in 2011).

Glowing Sonorities, an album with sonatas by Schubert, Reinecke and Franck (Hungaroton, 2016).

Transforming Traditions, captures own unique flute guitar transcriptions of keyboard works by Haydn, Mozart and Beethoven (Genuin, 2019).

Haydn and Mozart Flute quartets with violinist Katalin Kokas, violist Peter Barsony and cellist Dora Kokas are to be released by Hungaroton in early 2021.

Győri is co-author of the "Classical flute and guitar collection" released by Doblinger Music Publishing Austria. The series aims to widen the flute and guitar repertoire with true chamber music treasures, adding first time adaptations of keyboard works by Viennese classical composers to the current scope. Following Mozart's D minor Fantasy and Haydn's Hob. XVI:37 D major and Hob. XVI:30 A major sonatas, her transcription of the sonata Les Adieux by Beethoven was released in Autumn 2018.

In Spring 2018 Győri launched her "Noemi Collection", a series of collaboratively crafted art objects created with leading designers for flutists and non-musicians alike. The working process is a fusion of design and music, culminating in the creation of exceptionally unique objects.
