= Tzu-yi Chen =

Tzu-yi Chen 陳孜怡
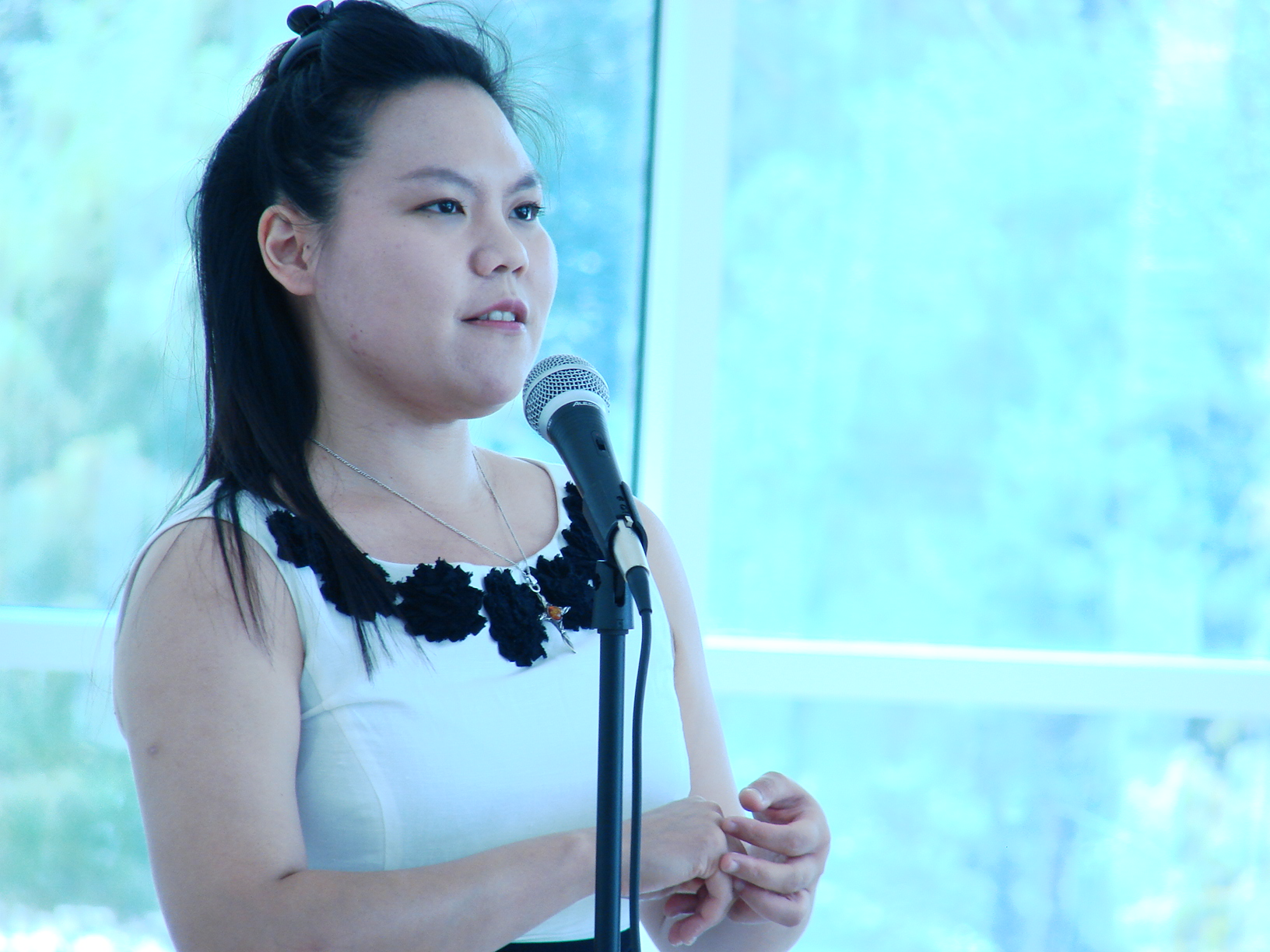

Background information
- Born: 1984 (age 40–41); Taipei, Taiwan
- Genres: Classical
- Instrument: Piano
- Member of: New Asia Chamber Music Society, Distinguished Concerts International New York
- Website: https://www.tycpiano.com/

Tzu-yi Chen (Chinese: 陳孜怡; born 1984), also known by her English name Zoe Chen, is a Taiwanese-American classical pianist and lecturer.

== Career ==
Chen's 2014 solo Carnegie Hall debut, which took place in Weill Recital Hall, garnered a rave review from the New York Concert Review. So did her 2019 duo performance there, as half of Renaissance Duo, with pianist Lan-In Winnie Yang and her 2022 appearance there in Stern Auditorium with a percussion ensemble performing an arrangement of Carl Orff's Carmina Burana. The presenter in all three of these Carnegie Hall appearances was Distinguished Concerts International New York.

In 2017, Chen traveled with the New Asia Chamber Music Society (NACMS) to Ascunçion as part of the closing events of the celebration of the 60th anniversary of the establishment of diplomatic relations between Taiwan and Paraguay. She appears on the society's 2018 CD, Unforgettable Memories, recorded live at the Kaufman Music Center's Merkin Hall in New York City. In 2020, she performed with the NACMS at the Smithsonian's Freer Gallery of Art.

Performances with professional orchestras include Beethoven's Piano Concerto No. 1 in C Major with the National Taiwan Symphony Orchestra in 1999 as part of the 20th Jie Shou Guan concert on the grounds of the Presidential Office Building in Taipei; Rachmaninoff's Piano Concerto in D-minor, No. 3, Op. 30 with the Taipei Symphony Orchestra in 2001 and again in 2012; Rachmaninoff's Rhapsody on a Theme of Paganini with the Kaohsiung Symphony Orchestra in 2015, superlatively reviewed; and Tchaikovsky's Piano Concerto No. 1 with the Space Coast Symphony in 2016.

She has performed at the Taiwan National Concert Hall (Taipei), the Church of the Epiphany (Washington, D. C.), and the Jule Collins Smith Museum of Fine Art (Auburn, Alabama) for its A Little Lunch Music series, among others.

== Education and awards ==
Chen graduated from The Affiliated Senior High School of National Taiwan Normal University in Taipei. In 2001, she won sixth prize in the Gina Bachauer International Piano Competition, Young Artist division. In the Fourth International Piano Competition of Mauro Paolo Monopoli in Barletta, Italy, in 2001, she shared First Absolute Prize with Roberto Corlianò.

In 2006 she earned the Premier Prix in music performance from the Paris Conservatory, having studied with Jacques Rouvier and Prisca Benoit.

In 2009, Chen completed requirements for the Solistenexamen (Soloist Exam) course of study at the Hochschule für Musik Karlsruhe, studying under Michael Uhde. That same year, Chen won fourth prize in the IX Darmstadt International Chopin Piano Competition.

From 2011-2013, while living in Columbus, Georgia, Chen studied with Van Cliburn International Piano Competition winner Alexander Kobrin at Columbus State University's Schwob School of Music, earning the Artist Diploma. While a student there, in 2013 she was among 133 pianists worldwide to be invited by the Van Cliburn competition to audition for its 14th edition. In 2014, she won the scholarship competition of the Atlanta Pro-Mozart Society.

In 2015 at the seventh annual Liszt-Garrison Festival & International Piano Competition in Baltimore, Chen won the Béla Bartók Award, shared second place in the Artist Category with Sejeong Jeong and shared a special Franz Liszt prize with Sarah Mi-Eun Kim.

In 2023, Chen published Departure, Conflict, and Rebirth in the Musical Language of Franz Liszt, a dissertation for the Doctor of Musical Arts she earned at the University of Maryland. There, she studied under Bradford Gowen.

== Personal life ==
Chen was born in Taipei, Taiwan. On January 13, 2024, she married Jason Shurb in Taipei.
