= Ts'ao Yung-ho =

Taiwanese historian

- 曹永和
- Born: 27 October 1920; Shirin Town, Shichisei District, Taihoku Prefecture, Taiwan, Empire of Japan
- Died: 12 September 2014 (aged 93); Taipei, Taiwan
- Relatives: Nymphia Wind (grand-nephew)
- Awards: Order of Orange-Nassau
- Scientific career
- Fields: Taiwanese history
- Institutions: National Taiwan University; Academia Sinica

Ts'ao Yung-ho (Chinese: 曹永和; pinyin: Cáo Yǒnghé; Wade–Giles: Ts'ao^{2} Yung^{3}-ho^{2}; Pe̍h-ōe-jī: Chô Éng-hô; 27 October 1920 – 12 September 2014) was a Taiwanese historian known for his work on the early history of Taiwan. An autodidact and polyglot who failed his university entrance examinations, Ts'ao went on to become the preeminent Taiwanese expert on the Dutch and Spanish colonial eras in Taiwan.

== Early life ==
Ts'ao was born in modern-day Taipei City's Shilin District in 1920, to a family that had produced several generations of educators. In 1939, he graduated from Taihoku Prefecture Second Junior High School, but failed his university entrance exams. He later developed a relationship with Iwao Seiichi of Taihoku Imperial University, who had spent time in England and the Netherlands. Iwao taught Ts'ao Dutch, which was essential for Ts'ao to read the archived material from the Dutch Formosa era. In 1947, Yang Yun-ping hired Ts'ao as a librarian at the university. The position gave Ts'ao access to a range of materials he would otherwise have been unable to see.

== Academic career ==
Ts'ao studied a number of languages in pursuit of his understanding of early Taiwanese history, meaning he could make use of ten languages: Taiwanese, Japanese, English, German, Mandarin Chinese, French, Dutch, Spanish, Portuguese, and Latin. The long-running historical journal, the Taiwan Bank Periodical (Chinese: 台灣銀行季刊; pinyin: Táiwān Yínháng Jìkān; Pe̍h-ōe-jī: Tâi-oân Gîn-hâng Kùi-khan) was masterminded by Ts'ao, while he was also heavily involved in the monumental series of Chinese source material on Taiwan and Fujian history, the Taiwan Documents Collection (Chinese: 台灣文獻叢刊; pinyin: Táiwān Wénxiàn Cóngkān; Pe̍h-ōe-jī: Tâi-oân Bûn-hiàn Chông-khan). Ts'ao retired from National Taiwan University in 1985. Over the course of his life, Ts'ao assembled a 20,000 volume library, classed as one of the finest collections on the Dutch East India Company in the world. Ts'ao was named a research fellow at Academia Sinica in 1998, becoming the institution's oldest research fellow and the fourth to obtain the position without completing a university degree. In 2002 Ts'ao was made an Officer of the Order of Orange-Nassau for his contributions in documenting the history of Dutch Formosa. Ts'ao died of multiple organ failure in Taipei on 12 September 2014, aged 93. In September 2024, National Taiwan University demolished houses on Lane 52 of Wenzhou Street in Taipei, including Ts'ao's former residence.

== Works ==
- Ts'ao, Yung-ho (1979). Taiwan zaoqi lishi yanjiu (Research into Early Taiwan History) (in Chinese). Taipei: Lianjing. ISBN 978-957-08-0698-4.
- Ts'ao, Yung-ho (2000). Taiwan zaoqi lishi yanjiu xuji (Research into Early Taiwan History: Continued) (in Chinese). Taipei: Lianjing. ISBN 957-08-2153-1.
