= Ed Yen =

Taiwanese music producer

- Occupations: Music businessman, music producer, music A & R, events producer

Ed Yen (Chinese: 嚴子貿; pinyin: Yán Zimào) is a Taiwanese executive producer within the creative industry. He has worked in Asia, Europe, and North America, producing over 50 albums, more than 150 theatre plays, mastering for over 400 album works.

Yen was awarded Producer of the Best Taiwanese Female Singer of the 15th Golden Melody Awards, Golden Horse Film Festival and Awards and Golden Bell Awards.
