= Anna Krauja =

Latvian opera singer

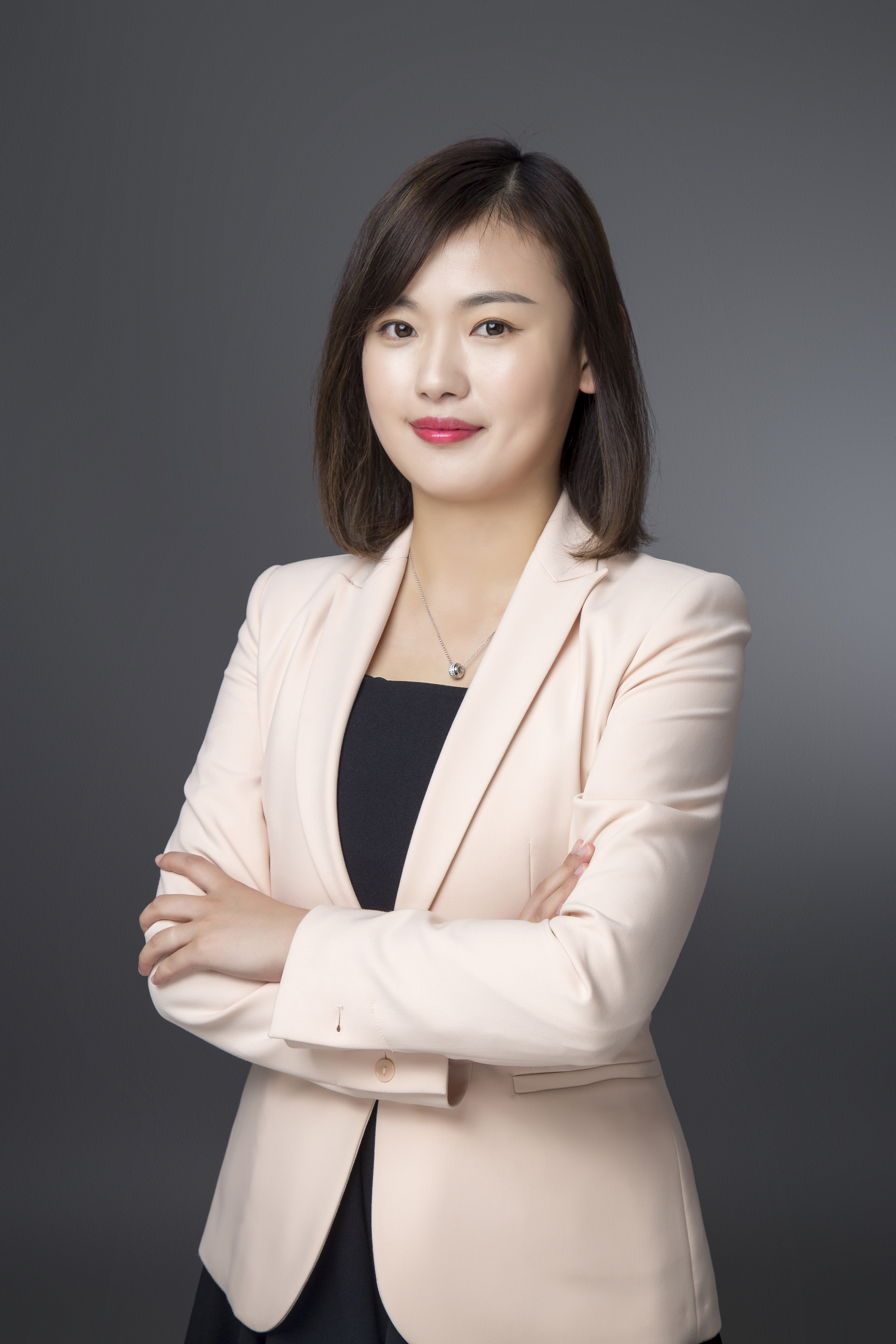
Anna Krauja Čena (Anna Chen) 2018.jpg

Anna Krauja Čena (born 1981) is a lyric soprano from Latvia. Born in Riga, Anna Krauja was elected International Mini Miss in a competition at the Latvian National Theatre in 1993 and was the first Latvian child to win this award. At her appearance she sang a song by Latvian composer Imants Kalniņš and received also the audience award. This success encouraged her already in childhood to become a singer.

Anna Krauja studied at the Latvian music academy Jāzepa Vītola Latvijas Mūzikas akadēmija with Kristīne Gailīte and at the Sibelius Academy with Marjut Hannula. In 2007 she performed at the Latvian National Opera the role of Achille in the opera Deidamia under the conductor Māris Kupčs auf. At the Aleksanterin Teatteri in Helsinki she performed in 2009 the role of Dalinda in the Opera Ariodante under Markus Lehtinen. As a soloist, chamber musician and tutor she was invited to the Beigang International Music Festival in Taiwan in 2009.

Besides her classical singing she performed also in musicals in 2008. At the Dailes-Theater she played the role of the narrator in Joseph and the Amazing Technicolor Dreamcoat.

In 2010 Anna performed a solo concert in Riga. Performance was held in Golden Sal of Latvian Community.
