= Lu Hung-chih =

Taiwanese social activist and musician (born 1992)

- Born: 1992 (age 33–34); Tainan
- Education: National Chung Cheng University
- Title: Leader of the Social Democratic Party
- Term: 2021–2024
- Political party: Social Democratic Party

Chinese name
- Traditional Chinese: 呂鴻志
- Simplified Chinese: 吕宏志
Transcriptions
Standard Mandarin
- Hanyu Pinyin: Lǚ Hóngzhì
- Bopomofo: ㄌㄩˇ ㄏㄨㄥˊ ㄓˋ
- Wade–Giles: Lü^{3} Hung^{2}-chih^{4}
- IPA: [lỳ xʊ̌ŋʈʂɻ̩̂]

Lu Hung-chih (Chinese: 呂鴻志; born 1992) is a Taiwanese social activist and heavy metal musician who served as leader of the Social Democratic Party from 2021 to 2024.

== Biography ==
Lu Hung-chih was born in Tainan in 1992. He attended National Nanke International Experimental High School and graduated from National Chung Cheng University in 2021 with a degree in political science. During his school years, Lu served as deputy head of the "Pastor Society" (Chinese: 牧夫們社), a student group that partook in the Sunflower Movement. After the Sunflower movement ended, Lu was active in the Democracy Kuroshio organization.

In 2011, Lu formed a heavy metal band—named "Burning Island" (Chinese: 火燒島樂團)—in which he is the lead singer. They released their first studio album in 2013, which was nominated for the fourth Golden Indie Music Awards' Best Debut Album and Best Group. Their second album in 2016 was nominated for the award's eighth Best Rock Album.

Lu was a founding member of the Social Democratic Party, a minor third-force party in Taiwan. In the 2016 legislative elections, he served as an aide to Chen Shang-chih, who unsuccessfully ran in Taipei's 4th district. On October 2, 2022, he was elected the party's fourth leader, a position he held until 2024, when he was succeeded by Hsu Yung. He also supported Miao Poya's Democratic Progressive Party-backed campaign for Taipei City Council, an election that was won, giving the party its only local council seat.

== See also ==
- Freddy Lim, Taiwanese heavy metal musician and co-founder of the New Power Party
