= Montgomery Symphony Orchestra =

Orchestra in Montgomery, Alabama (founded 1976)

- Orchestra
- Short name: MSO
- Founded: 1976
- Location: Montgomery, Alabama, U.S.
- Music director: Thomas Hinds
- Website: www.montgomerysymphony.org

The Montgomery Symphony Orchestra is a symphony orchestra in Montgomery, Alabama.

The MSO began in 1976 as a project of the city's Parks and Recreation Department, with thirty volunteer musicians and a part-time director. A board of directors now governs the orchestra, which is funded by concert sponsors and the Montgomery Symphony League. In 1989, the orchestra began performing regularly in the renovated Davis Theater in downtown Montgomery. The orchestra's most ambitious effort to date was a 1994 performance of Beethoven's Ninth Symphony, involving 85 instrumentalists and more than 200 singers.

The MSO has a full-time director, Thomas Hinds, as well as two artists in residence who serve as concertmaster and principal cellist, respectively. The two two-year fellowships begin in alternating years. In 2013, the fellowships were held by a married couple, violinist Mr. Robin Scott (2012–2013) and cellist Ms. Ahrim Kim (2013–2014). Previous fellows include Sun-Young Gemma Shin (violin) and Dan Totan (cello).

As of 2007, the orchestra had seventy-five members and presented eight concerts during the 2006–07 season, as well as educational programs and touring performances in central Alabama.

The MSO also sponsors the Montgomery Youth Orchestra.
