= Taiwan Independence Party =

Political party in Taiwan

Taiwan Independence Party 建國黨 Jiànguódǎng (Mandarin) Kien-koet Tóng (Hakka)
- Abbreviation: TAIP
- Founded: 6 October 1996
- Dissolved: 29 April 2020
- Split from: Democratic Progressive Party
- Headquarters: 9F, No.15-8, Sec. 5, Nanjing E. Rd., Taipei
- Ideology: Progressivism; Anti-imperialism; Taiwanese independence Anti-Chinese nationalism
- Political position: Left-wing to far-left
- National affiliation: Pan-Green Coalition

Party flag

Taiwan Independence Party
- Traditional Chinese: 建國黨
- Simplified Chinese: 建国党
- Literal meaning: Nation-establishing Party
Transcriptions
Standard Mandarin
- Hanyu Pinyin: Jiànguódǎng
Southern Min
- Hokkien POJ: Kiàn-kok Tóng

The Taiwan Independence Party (TAIP; Chinese: 建國黨; Pe̍h-ōe-jī: Kiàn-kok Tóng), also known as the Taiwan Nation Party, was a political party from 1996 to 2020 in Taiwan. It was usually associated with the Pan-Green Coalition and supported Taiwan independence.

== History ==
Disappointed by the Democratic Progressive Party's (DPP) gradual moderation of its support of Taiwan independence, some DPP members, many connected to Peng Ming-min's "Nation Building Association", formed the Taiwan Independence Party in 1996. However, the party has failed to win large-scale support, due to the lack of organizational skills and internal disagreements. It was largely displaced as Taiwan's ideological independence party by the Taiwan Solidarity Union (TSU). The Ministry of Interior removed its entry from the registry of parties on 29 April 2020.

== Election results ==
=== Legislative elections ===
Election	Total seats won	Total votes	Share of votes	Outcome of election	Election leader
1998	1 / 113	145,118	1.50%	▲1 seat	
2016	0 / 113	27,496	0.23%	▼ No seats	

== Party leaders ==
- Chen-Yuan Lee (1996–1997)
- Koh Se-kai (1997–1998)
- Cheng Pang-chen (1998–2000)
- Boonky Ho (2000–2002)
- Huang Chien-ming (黃千明; 2002–2007)
- Wu Ching-hsiang (吴景祥; 2007–2016)
- Ku Wen-fa (2016–2020)
