= Ching-Lien Wu =

French-Taiwanese choir director and choral conductor

- Born: Taiwan
- Genres: Classical, choir
- Occupation(s): Choir director, choral conductor.

Ching-Lien Wu is a French–Taiwanese choir director and choral conductor.

== Biography ==
Ching-Lien Wu graduated of the Taiwan Teachers' College. She then entered the Conservatoire National Supérieur de Musique de Lyon, where she was awarded the First Prize for Choral conducting in 1987.

In 1989, Ching-Lien Wu was appointed head of singing at the Angers-Nantes Opera, then assistant head of choirs at the Théâtre du Capitole in Toulouse in 1990. In 1991, she became head of the choral phalanx at the Opéra national du Rhin in Strasbourg. In 2001, she joined the Grand Théâtre de Genève.

In 2014, Ching-Lien Wu was appointed Chorus Master of the Dutch National Opera in Amsterdam.

In February 2021, Ching-Lien Wu was appointed to succeed José Luis Basso, and thus became the first female Chorus Master of the Paris Opera. She took up her post on 26 April 2021.
