= GorDoN =

Taiwanese hip-hop artist

GorDoN (Chinese: 楊國雋; pinyin: Yángguójuàn; born August 19, 1986) ), known in Chinese as Guodan (國蛋), is a Taiwanese hip-hop artist from Tainan. He graduated from National Tainan First Senior High School, before attending National Taiwan University, studying chemistry. In 2011, he moved to the US, to read for his master's degree. His vocal ability is typically characterized by a sort of lethargic or laid-back tone, and this style is said to have been deeply influenced by the works of the American rapper, Nas.

== Background ==
The lyrics of his work tend to provide vivid descriptions, with some songs describing the impact of cultural shock or the emotions one might experience when adapting to life in a new environment e.g. a big city. In his formative teenage years, he heard the music of Eminem for the first time, and it was this moment which made him want to immerse himself more in hip-hop culture and music. Around that time, while attending National Tainan First Senior High School, he joined Bamboo Gang, a high-school hip-hop group. He has worked with several other hip-hop band like "The Huangs (黃氏)", with this band having several members like Yance, RPG, Soft Lipa, and Lil' P. GorDoN's first major exploit in the scene was his 品質尚未保證 Mixtape. After the release of the mixtape, GorDoN's efforts in the hip-hop industry practically disappeared for several years. In 2007, he returned to the scene and joined the record label, KAO!INK, to which he has been with ever since.
