= Private Academic High School No. 8 =

VIII Prywatne Akademickie Liceum Ogólnokształcące of Kraków (English: Private Academic High School No 8 of Kraków) is a high school in Kraków, Poland. The school was established in 1993 under the name VIII Prywatne Liceum Ogólnokształcące (Private High School No 8) and has existed with the current name since 2004. Jerzy Waligóra is the founder of the school. The school offers an IB Diploma Programme. The school cooperates with Krakow's universities implementing joint educational programmes.

== Bibliography ==
- Rosowska, Renata, ed. (2009). 20-lecie szkolnictwa niepublicznego 1989-2009. Bielsko-Biała: KFON.
