= David Chou =

Taiwanese politician

Chou Po-lun MLY
- 周伯倫
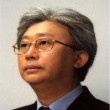

Member of the Legislative Yuan
- In office 1 February 1993 – 30 January 2003
- Constituency: Taipei County 1
- In office 1 February 1993 – 31 January 1999
- Constituency: Taipei County

Member of the Taipei City Council
- In office 25 December 1986 – 31 January 1993

Personal details
- Born: 13 November 1954 (age 71) Taipei, Taiwan
- Party: Democratic Progressive Party
- Education: Soochow University (LLB)

Chou Po-lun (Chinese: 周伯倫; born 13 November 1954), also known by his English name David Chou, is a Taiwanese politician. He served on the Taipei City Council from 1986 to 1993, when he was seated to the Legislative Yuan. Chou resigned in 2003, after being convicted on charges of bribery. He was sentenced to six years imprisonment and paroled in 2005.

== Education ==
Chou earned a bachelor's degree in law from Soochow University.

== Political career ==
Chou worked as Chen Shui-bian's legislative assistant from 1982 to 1985, and managed the successful 1986 electoral bid of Chen's wife Wu Shu-chen. He served in many high-ranking positions within the Democratic Progressive Party and was a member of the Taipei City Council for two terms prior to his 1992 election to the Legislative Yuan. Within the DPP, Chou belonged to the New Era Institute faction. Chou was opposed to the selection of Annette Lu as Chen Shui-bian's running mate for the 2000 presidential elections. During a portion of Chou's third legislative term, he served as DPP caucus convenor.

== Controversy ==
Legal proceedings against Chou began in 1988, when Chen Sheng-hung accused Chou of taking NT$16 million in bribes from Chiaofu Construction Corporation. The case was appealed to the Supreme Court in 2003, which refused to hear the case, upholding a guilty verdict issued by the Taiwan High Court. The Supreme Court additionally placed travel restrictions on Chou to prevent him from leaving Taiwan. He resigned from the Legislative Yuan following the Supreme Court decision. Chou began serving his six-year prison sentence at Hualien Prison in February 2003. Chou's first application for parole was rejected in January 2005. Weeks later, a second application was submitted, and subsequently approved in June 2005.
