= Pan Shiji =

Taiwanese composer, writer and music educator

Pan Shiji or Chew Shyh-Ji (Chinese: 潘世姬; born 29 July 1957) is a Taiwanese composer, writer and music educator.

== Biography ==
Pan Shiji was born in Taipei, and her family emigrated to Canada in 1974. She took piano lessons and studied composition with Hsu Tsang-houei in Taiwan. In Canada, she studied composition with Robert Turner at the University of Manitoba from 1976 to 80 and then in America studying with Chou Wen-chung at Columbia University, New York, from 1980 to 1988. During this time, she worked at the Columbia Center for Ethnomusicology. In 1988, she returned to Taiwan and took a position as professor of composition at the National Academy of the Arts. Her manuscripts are housed in the Liu Collection, Institute of Chinese Studies, University of Heidelberg.

== Works ==
Selected works include:

Orchestra:

- Dream World, 1979
- Music for Orchestra, 1980
- 3 Pieces, 1982
- Raining Night, 1997–9

Vocal:

- The Lodge Amid the Bamboos, 1980
- Paiju sanshou [3 Haiku], 1991
- 3 Songs (Pan), 1996
- In the Dark (Pan), 1998
- Qiu Lu, 1998

Chamber and solo instrument:

- Music for Hn and Pianoforte, 1979
- Music for Pianoforte, 1979
- Wind Quintet, 1979
- Brass Quintet, 1980
- String Quartet in 1 Movement, 1980
- Ensemble, 1981
- Hudson River Caprice, 1981
- String Quartet, 1981
- Piece, 1984
- String Quartet no.1, 1985
- String Quartet no.2, 1986
- String Quartet no.3, 1988
- Dubai de nigu [The Soliloquy of Pandora], 1990
- Configuration – Transformation – Shape
- Shapes, 1996
- Si, 1997
- String Quartet no.4, 1998

== Writings ==
- "Wei'erdi de geju yu guojia yishi" [Nationalism in Verdi's operas], Lishi yuekan, xiii/2 (1989)
- "Genji monogatari de yinyue shenghuo: shitan yazhou yinyue wenhua jiaoliu" [Musical life in the Tale of Genji: a study in Asian musical exchange], Yishu pinglun (1990), no.10
- "Anuo Xunbaike xunzhao shi'eryin zuopin hesheng ji qushi de tongyixing" [Schoenberg in search of harmonic and formal unity], Yishu pinglun (1993), no.10; (1995), no.10
- "Ershi shiji yinyue xin shengsi" [New ideas on 20th-century music] Biaoyan yishu zazhi (1994), no.9
