= Hsueh Ling =

Taiwanese politician

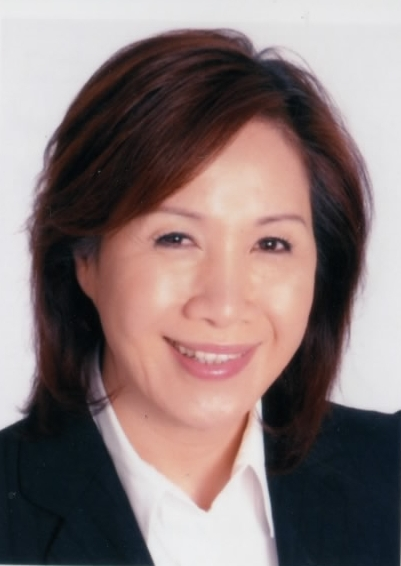

Hsueh Ling (Chinese: 薛凌; pinyin: Xuē Líng; Wade–Giles: Hsüeh Ling; born in 1954) is a member of the Democratic Progressive Party who is in the Legislative Yuan in Taiwan.
