= Lu Hsiu-yi =

Taiwanese politician

Member of the Legislative Yuan
- In office 1 February 1990 – 31 January 1998
- Constituency: Taipei County

Personal details
- Born: 22 May 1941 Sanshi, Tamsui, Taihoku Prefecture, Japanese Taiwan
- Died: 16 August 1998 (aged 57) Taipei, Taiwan
- Party: Democratic Progressive Party
- Spouse: Tchen Yu-chiou
- Children: Chia-Hui Lu
- Education: National Chengchi University (BA); Chinese Culture University (MA); Paris Nanterre University (PhD)
- Profession: Political scientist

Lu Hsiu-yi (Chinese: 盧修一; pinyin: Lú Xiūyī; Wade–Giles: Lú Hsiū-ī; Pe̍h-ōe-jī: Lô͘ Siu-it) was a Taiwanese political scientist and politician who was a member of the Legislative Yuan.

== Early life and education ==
Lu was born in Japanese Taiwan, on May 22, 1941. When he was six years old, his father died and the income of his family depended on his mother. Lu was an only child. He attended high school during the day and worked after school. After graduating from Taipei Municipal Jianguo High School, he earned a bachelor's degree in political science from National Chengchi University and a master's degree from Chinese Culture University. He then completed doctoral studies in France, where he earned his Ph.D. in political science from Paris Nanterre University in 1980.

== Career ==
Lu was a professor at Chinese Culture University and National Tsinghua University.

In January 1983, Lu was arrested and served time in prison until 1986. Lu's crime was "sedition" on promoting Taiwan independence.

In February 1990, Lu started his political career as a member of the Legislative Yuan for Taipei county in Taiwan.

== Personal life ==
Lu married Tchen Yu-chiou. Lu's daughter is Chia-Hui Lu, a classical pianist.

Since 1995, Lu has been suffering from lung cancer.

On August 16, 1998, Lu died in Tamsui, near Taipei, Taiwan. He was 57.
