= Chia-Hui Lu =

Taiwanese classical pianist (born 1976)

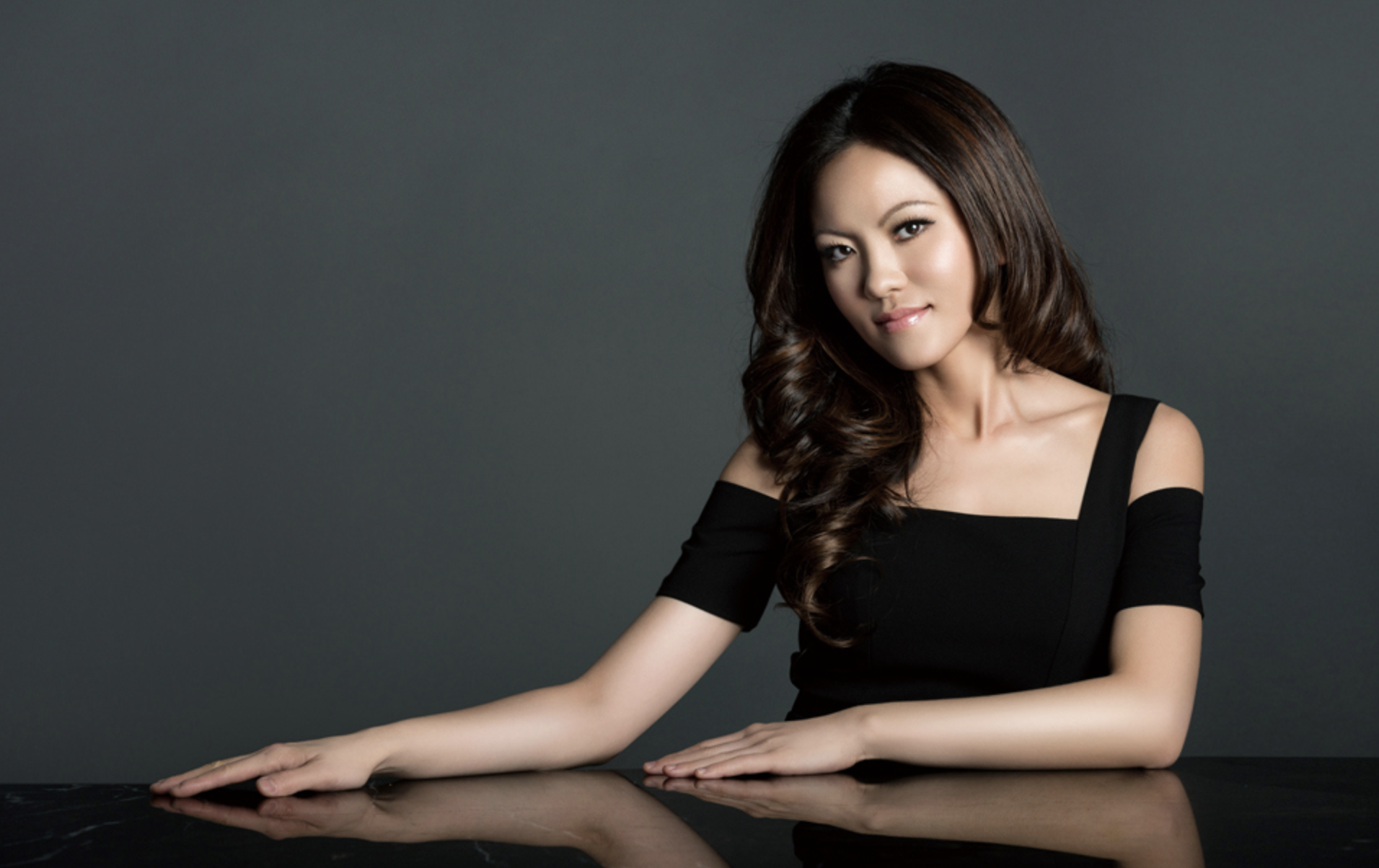

Background information
- Born: 1976 (age 48–49); Taipei, Taiwan
- Genres: Classical music
- Occupation(s): Pianist, non-profit chairwoman
- Instrument: Piano
- Labels: Rock Records
- Website: www.chiahuilu.com

Chia-Hui Lu
- Traditional Chinese: 盧佳慧
- Simplified Chinese: 卢佳慧
Transcriptions
Standard Mandarin
- Hanyu Pinyin: Lú jiā huì

Chia-Hui Lu (Chinese: 盧佳慧; pinyin: Lú Jiāhuì) is a Taiwanese classical pianist.

Lu is active in the cultural arts community in Taiwan. She is the chairwoman of the Egret Foundation, a non-profit organization that promotes Taiwan culture and arts. She is a faculty member of the National Taiwan University of Arts and the Affiliated Senior High School of National Taiwan Normal University. For her album Enchanted she transcribed Isaac Albéniz's Tango in D. For her album Amore, Lu composed "Butterfly Orchid".

== Classical music performances ==
Lu is a classical pianist by training and has played concerts in several countries. In New York City, Lu has performed recitals at Weill Recital Hall at Carnegie Hall, and Alice Tully Hall at Lincoln Center. In Europe, Lu performed at the Rome National Music Festival and Vasto Italy Festival. She also performed a recital in Barletta, Italy.

In Taiwan, Lu performed An Evening of Fantasy with the Taipei Metropolitan Symphony Orchestra, Care for Taiwan's Land Restoration Concert – Robert Schumann's Concerto in A Minor with Philharmonia Moment Musical, Sound of Formosa – the Piano Concerto premiere of Gordon Shi-Wen Chin with the National Symphony Orchestra, and Evening of Dance – piano recital, among others.

== Multimedia works ==
Lu's Amore multimedia work mixed a classical recital with animation created from Paul Chiang's paintings. Her Water on Fire piano recital combined Western classical music with Eastern poetry from a Taiwan poet, Goya Lan. Lu curated artwork from over thirty seven artists at the Art Taipei exhibition. She was later invited to perform at the opening ceremony of Art Taipei 2020, and at the Diversonics Festival 2021. She also curated the Sacred Garden at the international Ars Electronica Festival in 2021.

Lu was the music director for Sayion I and Sayion II, which incorporated music with dancers that are suited up in sensors that controlled the visual background. In collaboration with IF+, Lu produced Obsession, employing various immersive technologies including virtual reality (VR), augmented reality (AR) and mixed reality (MR), all under the umbrella of XR extended reality.

== Awards ==
- 1987, First prize winner of the Taipei seventy-sixth solo piano music competition
- 1990, Winner of the seventy-eighth Junior solo piano music competition at the Southern District of Taipei
- 1991, Winner of the eightieth youth piano solo music competition in the Southern District of Taipei
- 2000, Winner of the 28th Anniversary International's Young Artists Award
- 2003, Winner of the 30th Anniversary International's Young Artists Outstanding Alumni Award
- 2021, Winner, Silver, of the MUSE Design Award to the Egret Foundation, for Amore
- 2021, Winner, Silver, of the MUSE Silver Design Award to the Egret Foundation, for Impression of Taiwan
- 2021, Special Mention of the German Design Award for Impression of Taiwan
- 2021, Winner of the ICONIC Awards for Impression of Taiwan
- 2021, Honorable Mention of the International Design Awards for Amore
- 2021, Honorable Mention of the International Design Awards for Butterfly Orchid
- 2021, Honorable Mention of the international Design Awards for Impression of Taiwan
- 2021, Shortlist of London International Creative Competition for Butterfly Orchid
- 2021, Winner of the New York Film Awards (Best Song, Best Music Video, Best Animation) for Butterfly Orchid
- 2021, Winner of the Toronto International Women Film Festival (Best Female Composer) for Butterfly Orchid
- 2021, Honorable Mention for Sound Design at the Los Angeles Film Awards for Butterfly Orchid
- 2021, Winner of the MUSE Design Award, Conceptual Design for Butterfly Orchid
- 2021, Winner of the DNA Paris Design Awards, Graphic Design/Colorful Project for Butterfly Orchid
- 2021, Official Selection for the Fine Arts Film Festival, Butterfly Orchid
- 2021, Official selection, St. Louis International Film Festival, SLIFF/Kids Family Shorts 1, Butterfly Orchid
- 2021, Winner of A' Design Awards for "Amore"
- 2021, Winner of the DNA Paris Design Awards for XR Obsession
- 2021, Winner of the MUSE Creative Award for XR Obsession
- 2021, Winner of the Global Film Festival Awards (Best Documentary & Best Sound Design) for Beauty of Taiwan
- 2021, Honorable Mention for Documentary Short at the Festigious International Film Festival for Beauty of Taiwan
- 2022, Winner of the New York Independent Cinema Awards (Best Composer) for XR Obsession
- 2022, Official Selection for the Berlin Short Film Festival, Butterfly Orchid
- 2022, Winner of the New York International Film Awards (Best Song & Grand Jury Award) for XR Obsession
- 2022, Winner of the Oniros Film Awards (Best Art Director) for XR Obsession
- 2022, Winner of the Vegas Shorts Awards (Best Director & Composer) for XR Obsession
- 2022, Honorable Mention for Score at the Top Shorts Awards for XR Obsession
- 2022, Winner of Best Composer at the Chicago Indie Film Awards for XR Obsession
- 2022, Winner Canadian Cinematography Awards for Best Sound Beauty of Taiwan
