= Seiichi Iwao =

Japanese historian and writer

- 岩生 成一
- Born: June 2, 1900; Tokyo, Japan
- Died: March 21, 1988 (aged 87)
- Education: University of Tokyo (PhD)
- Occupation: University professor

Seiichi Iwao (岩生 成一, Iwao Seiichi; June 2, 1900 – March 21, 1988) was a Japanese academic, an historian and author. He was, for many years, a professor at the University of Tokyo.

== Early life ==
Seiichi was born in Tokyo. He attended the University of Tokyo, graduating in 1925.

== Career ==
Seiichi was a member of the faculty of the University of Tokyo. His contribution to Japanese historiography is measured in the effect his teaching and example produced in a younger generation of students.

=== Indonesian history ===
Iwao was considered a leading scholar in the colonial period of Indonesian history. His study of Japanese towns in South Asia before the Pacific War was published in A study of Japanese Towns in the South (南洋日本町の研究, Nan'yo Nihonmachi no kenkyu). The research used documents of the Dutch East Indies Company in the archives of the Hague and Jakarta.

=== Japanese history ===
Iwao's research and writing covered a broad range, including his early work on Japanese emigrant communities in South Asia and his later work on the Edo period of national seclusion (sakoku).

== Selected works ==
In a statistical overview derived from writings by and about Seiichi Iwao, OCLC/WorldCat encompasses roughly 100+ works in 200+ publications in 7 languages and 1,500+ library holdings.

- 1940 – A study of Japanese Towns in the South Seas (南洋日本町の研究, Nan'yo Nihonmachi no kenkyu)
- 1943 – Early Japanese settlers in the Philippines (フィリピンの初期日本人入植者)
- 1958 – Research on the History of Red Seal Ship Trade (朱印船貿易史の研究)
- 1962 – Shuinsen and Nihonmachi (朱印船と日本町)
- 1966 – Isolationism (鎖国)
- 1979 – Early Modern Western Studies and Maritime Diplomacy (近世の洋学と海外交涉)
- 2001 – Essays on the History of Taiwan in the Dutch Era (荷蘭時代台灣史論文集)
- 1982 – Biographical Dictionary of Japanese History 1982, with Burton Watson
- 2002 – Dictionnaire historique du Japon, Vol. I; Vol. II, with Teizō Iyanaga, Susumu Ishii, Shōichirō Yoshida et al.

== Affiliations ==
- Japan Academy, elected 1965.
- Franco-Japanese Historical Society (Societe Franco-Japonaise des Sciences Historiques; Nichi-Futsu Rekishi Gakkai)
- Japan-Netherlands Institute (Nichi-Ran Gakkai)

== Honors ==
- Imperial Academy, Imperial Academy Prize, 1941
- Order of the Sacred Treasure, 1970.
