= Marie-Claire Matip =

Cameroonian writer living in Paris (born 1938)

- Born: Marie-Claire-Eléonore-Débochère Matip; 1938 (age 87–88); Eséka, Cameroon
- Education: University of Montpellier; Sorbonne
- Occupation: Writer
- Children: 5, inc. Princess Erika
- Writing career
- Notable work: Ngonda (1958)

Marie-Claire-Eléonore-Débochère Matip (born 1938) is a Cameroonian writer living in Paris. Her autobiographical novel Ngonda, published in 1958, is one of the first French-language texts to be published by a sub-Saharan African woman.

== Early life and education ==
Marie-Claire Matip was born in 1938 in Eséka, Cameroon. Her father, Matip Ma Soundjock or Henri Matip, was a tribal leader among the Bassa people, the last traditional chief of the Ndog-Nje clan. He had several wives, and she was one of about fifty children. Her father was part of the local elite and served as an intermediary between the colonial administration and the local population, so her family thus remained part of the aristocratic class even as colonization progressed, well until the 1950s. However, he secretly supported the Union of the Peoples of Cameroon, a left-wing national liberation party that was particularly active in Eséka.

Matip's education began with a tutor at home, before she enrolled in the public school in Eséka. At 13 years of age, despite her mother's misgivings, she left for boarding school several hours away at the Collège Moderne de Jeunes Filles in Douala. It was there that she began writing her first novel, Ngonda ("Young Girl"), an autobiographical story about of her childhood in Cameroon.

== Career ==
Matip's formative years coincided with the turbulent years between World War II—during which the three colonial powers present in the region, Germany, France, and Great Britain, clashed violently—and Cameroonian independence. It was also a period when traditional societal hierarchies were being called into question, schooling was becoming more widespread, and women were slowly gaining new opportunities. It was in this context that Matip wrote Ngonda, a semi-autobiographical work written in French, describing the life of a young woman in Cameroon.

Matip held on to her draft for several years, and in 1958 she managed to get it published by the Librairie du Messager. It is widely recognized as one of the first, if not the first, books published by a female author in sub-Saharan Africa. While the work is not explicitly revolutionary, it is imbued with a fundamentally feminist viewpoint and, notably, emphasizes the right of women to learn to read and write.

In 1956, she won a contest sponsored by Elle magazine and Air France that allowed her to travel to France; she returned to France the following year, after being picked for a radio hosting program. Matip subsequently set up a radio program, Les beaux Samedis, for young Cameroonians and served as its host. In 1958, she studied for her baccalauréat at the Lycée Général Leclerc in Yaoundé. She then studied arts and Protestant theology at the University of Montpellier and philosophy, psychology, and sociology at the Sorbonne, receiving a doctorate from the latter institution, with her thesis focusing on roles of African women.

She married a Cameroonian student, from the Bafia people, and settled in France. The couple was unable to return to Cameroon for political reasons. They had five children, four daughters and a son. Three of them became singers, at one time performing together as the Blackheart Daughters: Princess Mataji Maa Tejomayee Devi (born Esther Dobong'Na Essiene and also known as Estha Divine, Esta, and Princess Mataji); Princess Erika; and the late Eva (also known as Sister Hewan).

Under her married name Madame Dobong'Na-Essiene, she has worked in various positions including as a secretary, a psychologist, and a market researcher.
