= Kang Bûn-iā =

Taiwanese composer

- 江文也
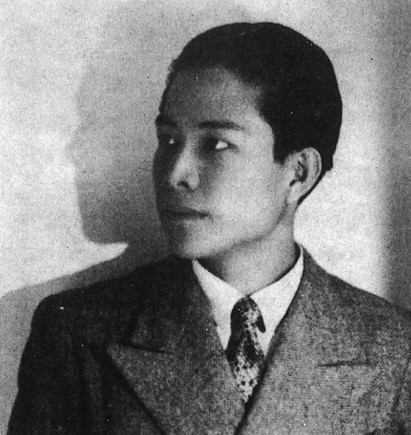
- Chiang in the 1930s
- Pronunciation: Kang Bûn-iā
- Born: 11 July 1910; Dadaocheng, Taipei, Taiwan
- Died: 24 October 1983 (aged 73); Beijing
- Occupation: composer
- Notable work: Formosan Dance, Symphonia Lucis Universalis

Kang Bûn-iā, Chiang Wen-yeh or Jiang Wenye (Chinese: 江文也; pinyin: Jiāng Wényě; Pe̍h-ōe-jī: Kang Bûn-iā; June 11, 1910 – October 24, 1983) was a Taiwan-born composer, active mainly in Japan and later in China. He was born in Dadaocheng, Taipei, Taiwan and died in Beijing. While often known in the West by renditions of his Chinese name, the three Chinese characters that form his name are pronounced Kō Bunya (こう ぶんや) in Japanese, and thus he is also known as Koh Bunya in the West. In his compositions, which range from for piano to choral and orchestral works, he merged elements of traditional Chinese, Taiwanese, and Japanese music with modernist influences. Due to the political turmoil surrounding his life, he came to be largely forgotten during the latter part of his life. After his death, however, his work has started to gain new recognition in East Asia as well as in the West.

== Biography ==
Chiang was born in 1910 to Chinese parents in Tamsui, Taiwan – a Japanese territory at the time, and so his nationality was Japanese from birth. He is of Yongding, Fujian Hakka ancestry. In 1923, he went to Ueda, a small town in the prefecture of Nagano, Japan, to attend secondary school. He later proceeded to the Tokyo Engineering and Commerce Advanced School (presently Musashi Institute of Technology) where his major was electrical engineering. At the same time, he also started to attend evening classes at the Tokyo Music School (today part of the Tokyo National University of Fine Arts and Music).

Initially, he was active as a singer, and in 1932, discovered by his choir leader, he became a baritone singer for the Columbia Record Company. A few years later, he would become a member of the Opera Company led by one of Japan's foremost opera singers, Yoshie Fujiwara. In 1933, he married his first wife, a Japanese woman. Around this time, he also started studying composition under prominent composers Kosaku Yamada and Kunihiko Hashimoto. Soon, he started to earn laurels as a composer himself, and a breakthrough came in 1936 when he submitted the orchestral work Formosan Dance to the art competition of the Berlin Summer Olympics, which was honourably mentioned. Alexander Tcherepnin who was visiting China and Japan at the time recognized Chiang's talent and published his works in Europe, the United States, and China.

In 1938, in the midst of the Second Sino-Japanese War, Chiang was appointed professor of musical arts at the Teacher's College in Beijing, which was then under Japanese control. The Japanese government considered him a valuable tool to gain the appeal of the general public of both nations. In the ensuing years, he commuted between Beijing and Tokyo, where his family still resided. During this time, he was one of the most frequently played composers in Japan. However, that was to change as the Japanese surrender in 1945 deprived him of his Japanese nationality; he became a composer of the People's Republic of China, and his name soon vanished from the Japanese music scene.

In Communist China, Chiang's cultural and political bonds to Japan and his aesthetic affinity with European modernism led him to be regarded as a traitor and a bourgeois. In order not to be expunged, he was forced to recast his style of composition to comply with the more moderate taste of the party. Events such as the Anti-Rightist Movement in the 1950s and early 1960s, and the Cultural Revolution launched in 1966 made him a political target. Some of his compositions, including three symphonies with opus numbers, seem to have disappeared in the midst of these charges.

In 1978, his honor was finally restored. By that time, however, he was afflicted with disease, and he died in Beijing in 1983.

== Renewed interest ==
Following his exoneration, Chiang is today gradually being rediscovered by a new generation of East Asians including audiences in Taiwan, mainland China, Hong Kong, and Japan.

Chiang Wen-yeh was a theme of the 2003 Japanese film Café Lumière directed by Taiwanese director Hou Hsiao-hsien, which tells the story of a young Japanese woman doing research on the composer. His work is featured on the soundtrack, and his Japanese wife and daughter make appearances as themselves.

== Compositions ==
- Formosa Dance Opus 1
- Five Sketches (1935)
- 4 Seiban Songs (1936)
- 3 Dances for Piano Opus 7
- 16 Bagatelles Opus 8
- Ceremony sontata for Flute and Piano Opus 17
- The Peking Myriorama Opus 22
- The Princess Shian-Fei Opus 34
- Piano Sonata No. 3 "Jiangnan Scenery" Opus 39
- 12 Poems on Folk Festivals Opus 53
- Piano Sonata No. 4 "Carnival Days" Opus 54
- Capriccio "The Fisherman's Boat Song" Opus 56
- Violin sontata "Hymns for Spring" Opus 59
- Symphonia Lucis Universalis (1943)
- The song of Ali Mountain
- A Confucian Ceremony
- Taiwan Dances
- "Hometown Festival" (Suite)
- "Guluo River" (Symphonic Poem)
- Symphonic Poem "Drowned in the Miluo River"
- Piano Trio "High Up in Taiwanese Mountain"

== Sources ==
- Katayama, Motohide (2001). Biography in the booklet of audio CD Jiang Wen-Ye (1910–1983) Piano Works in Japan, J.Y. Song (performer), New York, NY: Pro Piano Records.
- Yu, Yuzhi (1994). "Composer Jiang Wenye" in Modern and Contemporary Chinese Musicians' Biographies, Wei Tingge (ed.) Volume 2, pp. 98–110, Shenyang, China: Spring Wind Cultural Press. Translation by Elaine Chew, retrieved from https://web.archive.org/web/20060209180244/http://www-rcf.usc.edu/~echew/projects/ChineseMusic/composers/jiang_wenye.html, on February 27, 2008.
- Taiwanese (Japanese/Chinese) Musician "Chiang Wen-yeh" (Taipei Music)
- Han Cheung (29 July 2018). "Taiwan in Time: Wrong times for a great talent". Taipei Times.
