= Chung Yuan Christian University =

University in Taoyuan City, Taiwa

Coordinates: 24°57′29.39″N 121°14′30.45″E

- 中原大學
- Former names: Chung Yuan Christian College of Science and Engineering (1955–1980)
- Motto: 篤信力行
- Type: Private university
- Established: 1955
- Students: 16,696
- Location: Zhongli, Taoyuan City, Taiwan
- Website: www.cycu.edu.tw

Chung Yuan Christian University
- Traditional Chinese: 中原大學
Transcriptions
Standard Mandarin
- Hanyu Pinyin: Zhōngyuán Dàxué
Southern Min
- Hokkien POJ: Tióng-gôan-tāi-ha̍k

Chung Yuan Christian University (CYCU; Chinese: 中原大學; Pe̍h-ōe-jī: Tióng-gôan-tāi-ha̍k) is a private university in Zhongli District, Taoyuan City, Taiwan. The university was established as Chung Yuan Christian College of Science and Engineering in 1955 by a group of Taiwanese and American Christian educators to train science and engineering talent in the Christian spirit. The school was upgraded to a full university and renamed Chung Yuan Christian University in 1980. CYCU is a member of United Board.

== Education mission and ranking ==
CYCU's stated mission is "to promote higher education for the benefit of the Chinese people, aiming at the pursuit and advancement of genuine knowledge in order to maintain our cultural heritage and, thus, to serve humankind."

== History ==
The university was originally established as Chung Yuan Christian College of Science and Engineering (CYCC) in October 1955 by a group of Christian educators and local gentry. The college comprised four departments: physics, chemistry, chemical engineering, and civil engineering. CYCC was renamed Chung Yuan Christian University (CYCU) on 1 August 1980.

== Colleges ==
CYCU has 7 colleges, 26 departments, 24 master's programs, and 12 PhD programs. CYCU has more than 70,000 alumni.

- College of Science
- College of Engineering
- College of Business (accredited by AACSB)
- College of Electrical Engineering and Computer Science
- College of Design
- School of Law
- College of Humanities and Education

== Presidents ==
Dr. Samuel K.C. Chang has been the school's president since 2013. Past presidents and administrators include Kuo Ke-tee, Hsieh Ming-shan, Han Wei, Yuan Ta-nien, Yin Shiu-hau, Chang Kwang-cheng, Hsiung Shen-kan and Cheng Wan-Lee.

== Notable alumni ==
- Chang Chia-hang, internet personality
- Chang Fan, political deputy, minister of Finance (2014–2016)
- Chiu Jeng-jiann, deputy Minister of Science and Technology
- Hwang Jung-chiou, chairman of Taiwan Power Company, vice minister of the Ministry of Economic Affairs (2009–2012)
- Yan Jeou-rong, deputy minister of Public Construction Commission
- Yu Hsiao-cheng, deputy chairperson of National Communications Commission
- Wen-Hsiung Li, fellow of Academia Sinica specializing in genomics
- Weng Chang-liang, magistrate of Chiayi County

== Name ==
Although similar in name, Chung Yuan Christian University does not have any relationship with the following universities in China: Zhongyuan University of Technology in Zhengzhou, and the short-lived Zhongyuan University which was founded by Deng Xiaoping, existed in the 1940s and 1950s, and later merged into Zhongnan University of Economics and Law and Huazhong Normal University, both in Wuhan.

== Tradition andfFounding principles ==
In response to Taiwan's 2016 recognition of same-sex marriage, Chung Yuan Christian University released a statement in opposition, citing the university's Christian and Biblical founding principles.

== Asteroid ==
Asteroid 187636 Chungyuan was named in honor of the university. The official naming citation was published by the Minor Planet Center on 25 September 2018 (M.P.C. 111803).

== See also ==
- List of universities in Taiwan
