= Wellington Koo (politician, born 1958) =

Taiwanese lawyer and politician

Koo Li-hsiung MLY
- 顧立雄
- Official portrait, 2024

35th Minister of National Defense
- Incumbent
- Assumed office 20 May 2024
- Premier: Cho Jung-tai
- Preceded by: Chiu Kuo-cheng

18th Secretary-General of the National Security Council
- In office 20 May 2020 – 20 May 2024
- Chairwoman: Tsai Ing-wen
- Preceded by: David Lee
- Succeeded by: Joseph Wu

11th Chairman of the Financial Supervisory Commission
- In office 8 September 2017 – 19 May 2020
- Premier: William Lai; Su Tseng-chang
- Deputy: See list: Cheng Cheng-mount, Huang Tien-mu Chang Chuang-chang
- Preceded by: Lee Ruey-tsang
- Succeeded by: Huang Tien-mu

1st Chairman of the Ill-gotten Party Assets Settlement Committee
- In office 31 August 2016 – 8 September 2017
- Premier: Lin Chuan
- Preceded by: Position established
- Succeeded by: Lin Feng-cheng

Member of the Legislative Yuan
- In office 1 February 2016 – 11 August 2016
- Succeeded by: Julian Kuo
- Constituency: Party-list

Personal details
- Born: 31 October 1958 (age 68) Taipei, Taiwan
- Party: Democratic Progressive Party
- Spouse: Wang Mei-hua (m. 1983)
- Education: National Taiwan University (LLB); New York University (LLM)
- Profession: Lawyer

Military service
- Branch/service: Republic of China Army
- Years of service: 1980 - 1982
- Rank: Second Lieutenant
- Unit: Reserve Officers

Chinese name
- Traditional Chinese: 顧立雄
- Simplified Chinese: 顾立雄
Transcriptions
Standard Mandarin
- Hanyu Pinyin: Gù Lìxióng
- Wade–Giles: Ku Li-hsiung

Koo Li-hsiung (Chinese: 顧立雄; pinyin: Gù Lìxióng; born 31 October 1958), also known by his English name Wellington Koo, is a Taiwanese politician and lawyer who has served as Minister of National Defense since 2024.

During his legal career, Koo represented several politicians. His own political career began with a term on the National Assembly, followed by an unsuccessful campaign for the Taipei mayoralty in 2013. In 2016, he was elected a legislator at large representing the Democratic Progressive Party. Koo left the Legislative Yuan to lead the Ill-gotten Party Assets Settlement Committee. In 2017, he became chairman of the Financial Supervisory Commission. Koo was appointed secretary-general of the National Security Council in 2020. Koo served in the role until 2024, when he was appointed Minister of National Defense.

== Early life and education ==
Koo was born on 31 October 1958 in Keelung, Taiwan. His ancestral home is in Nantong, Jiangsu, China. His parents were Shanghainese Chinese. His mother, Koo Yin Ai-lien (顧殷愛蓮), died on 30 October 2014 at the age of 86. Koo's father was a sailor on merchant ships, and in 1948 Ai-lien came to Taiwan with her husband on their honeymoon. The ship they arrived on never sailed back, so the couple settled in Keelung. Koo was the fifth child in his family. Following their father's example, Koo's eldest and second-eldest brothers both studied at China Maritime Junior College (now Taipei University of Marine Technology).

Koo was raised as a second-generation waishengren in a family with pan-Blue political leanings. He speaks fluent Taiwanese Hokkien. His childhood home was on Xiding Road in Keelung, and he attended Xiding Elementary School and Anle Junior High School. He was admitted to and graduated from the Affiliated Senior High School of National Taiwan Normal University.

After high school, Koo graduated from National Taiwan University with a Bachelor of Laws (LL.B.) degree, in 1980. Among his undergraduate classmates was Wang Mei-hua, whom he later married. After graduating, he completed compulsory military service as a reserve officer, serving as a second lieutenant and transport platoon leader in a boat battalion in the Republic of China Army. He spent his entire term of service stationed in Keelung.

Because he first had to complete his military service, Koo passed the bar two years after Wang passed the civil service examination in 1981. He took the lawyers' examination in July 1983, successfully qualifying as an attorney, and married Wang in December 1983. Later, in 1987, Koo went to the United States to pursue graduate studies at New York University. He earned a Master of Laws (LL.M.) degree in public service law from the New York University School of Law.

== Legal career ==
Koo worked for Formosa Transnational Attorneys at Law, a firm founded by Fan Kuang-chun and John Chen. While with the firm, Koo, Lee Fu-tien, and four other Taiwanese lawyers served as liaisons between taishang based in mainland China and the businesspeople's Chinese attorneys. He also mentored Su Chiao-hui and represented Chen Shui-bian and Annette Lu during the 2004 presidential election. Other clients include Chao Chien-ming in a 2006 embezzlement scandal, and the Hung Chung-chiu family in 2013. Koo has also served as legal counsel for Lee Teng-hui and Tsai Ing-wen, as well as the student activists who led the 2014 Sunflower protests and the 2015 protest of curriculum guidelines. In 2014, he joined the defense team of Chiou Ho-shun, a man subject to the longest criminal case in Taiwanese judicial history who had been imprisoned for the murder of Lu Cheng in 1987. In December 2015, Koo, representing the Democratic Progressive Party as a whole, charged Kuomintang chairman Eric Chu with attempting to buy votes. He also acted as the DPP's legal counsel in a case against a group of KMT legislators who alleged that Tsai Ing-wen had engaged in land speculation.

== Political career ==
In June 2005, Koo served on the National Assembly. In September 2013, Koo announced his intent to run for the mayoralty of Taipei as a member of the Democratic Progressive Party. A primary held in May 2014, after the Sunflower Movement, was won by Pasuya Yao, and Koo dropped out of the race. Yao later dropped out of the race, endorsing Ko Wen-je, who won the mayoral election as an independent candidate.

Koo, then the director of the Judicial Reform Foundation, was selected for the Democratic Progressive Party's proportional representation ballot in November 2015. Listed fourth on the ballot during the 2016 legislative election, he won a seat in the Legislative Yuan. In his time as legislator, he called for the establishment of a government commission on human rights. Koo also coauthored amendments to the Act Governing Relations with Hong Kong and Macau in an attempt to simplify the process for political asylum-seekers from those areas to Taiwan. He also proposed an amendment to the Narcotics Hazard Prevention Act, stating that people involved in the illegal drug trade should be treated for addiction prior to being put on trial. The Act Governing the Handling of Ill-gotten Properties by Political Parties and Their Affiliate Organizations, which he helped to write, was passed in July and Koo was named to a commission set up to investigate questionable assets in August. He stepped down from the Legislative Yuan to take the appointment, and was succeeded in office by Julian Kuo. Koo assumed the committee chairmanship despite the Kuomintang citing Article 20 of the Act, which requires nonpartisan committee members, in its objections to Koo's leadership. Koo named most of the committee members on 24 August, and the group was officially established on 31 August.

Koo was appointed to the chairmanship of the Financial Supervisory Commission in September 2017, succeeding Lee Ruey-tsang on the same day that William Lai replaced Lin Chuan as premier. Koo stated shortly before taking control of the FSC that he sought to implement a "differentiated management style" in which financial institutions that ranked higher would be allowed more regulatory freedom to innovate within the financial services sector, and those institutions that did less well would be granted less latitude. Koo left the Financial Supervisory Commission in May 2020 and became the secretary-general of the National Security Council.

On 17 August 2022, in the aftermath of then Speaker of the United States House of Representatives Nancy Pelosi's visit to Taiwan on 2–3 August, China blacklisted seven Taiwanese officials including Koo as "diehard "Taiwan independence" separatists" due to their support for Taiwanese independence. The blacklist bans them from entering mainland China and the Special Administrative Regions of Hong Kong and Macau, and restricts them from working with Chinese officials. Chinese state-run tabloid Global Times labelled Koo and the six officials as "diehard secessionists".

On 25 April 2024, Koo was appointed Minister of National Defense in the incoming William Lai presidential administration. Koo became the first civilian leader of the Ministry of National Defense since Andrew Yang.

On 23 May, China conducted military exercises around Taiwan. On 6 June, Koo replied to the inquiry of MP Puma Shen in the Legislative Yuan with the military reform measures:

1. Cancelling the traditional bayonet piercing format that does not conform to the practical melee combat principle.
2. Abolishing the formalistic mandatory daily reports during personnel's off-camp weekends and holidays.
3. Personnel are free to travel abroad individually without the restriction in groups only.
4. Removing the goose marching shows in the Military Academy, same as the combined arms brigade troops back to their combat training duty.
5. Operational and tactical commands are authorized to the Chief of the general Staff as before for exercise efficiency.
6. Cancelling the order retaining either the chief or deputy commanders in camp all the time, to restore the regular holiday and vacation schedules.
7. Following the US military example to set the examination protocols of security clearance by personnel's actual working authorization instead of his/her rank.

== Personal life ==
Koo is married to Wang Mei-hua, whom he met when they were both law students at National Taiwan University. They married in December 1983. They have two sons; their second son graduated from National Taiwan University's economics department in 2014.

Koo has named his mother as the person who influenced him most, and Ronald Dworkin's Is Democracy Possible Here? as the book that influenced him most.
