= Lee Ruey-tsang =

Taiwanese banker and politician

- 李瑞倉

Chairperson of Financial Supervisory Commission
- In office 19 October 2016 – 7 September 2017
- Vice: Huang Tien-mu, Cheng Cheng-mount
- Preceded by: Ding Kung-wha; Huang Tien-mu (acting)
- Succeeded by: Wellington Koo

Minister of Finance (acting)
- In office 13 March 2008 – 19 May 2008
- Preceded by: Ho Chih-chin
- Succeeded by: Lee Sush-der

Political Deputy Minister of Finance
- In office May 2004 – May 2008
- Minister: Lin Chuan; Joseph Lyu; Ho Chih-chin

Personal details
- Education: National Chengchi University (BA, MA)

Lee Ruey-tsang (Chinese: 李瑞倉; pinyin: Lǐ Ruìchāng) is a Taiwanese banker and politician. He led the Financial Supervisory Commission from 19 October 2016 to 7 September 2017. Prior to assuming the chairmanship of the FSC, he was chairman of the Bank of Kaohsiung. He has served as Vice Minister of Finance and became acting finance minister in 2008, after Ho Chih-chin resigned.

== Education ==
Lee graduated from National Chengchi University with a bachelor's degree and a master's degree in land economics.

== Banking career ==
Lee was the Director of Farmers Bank of China from September 1999 to April 2002, Director of Bank of Taiwan from April 2002 to May 2004, Managing Director of Bank of Taiwan from May 2004 to May 2008, acting Chairperson of Bank of Taiwan in January–February 2006, Managing Director of Bank of Kaohsiung from June 2011 to October 2016 and Chairman of Bank of Kaohsiung from November 2016 to October 2016.

== Politics ==
Lee was the Director-General of National Property Administration of Ministry of Finance from September 1999 to May 2004, and Political Deputy Minister of Ministry of Finance from May 2004 to May 2008. In this position, he succeeded Ho Chih-chin as acting Minister of Finance when Ho resigned in March 2008. Lee was then appointed Director-General of Finance Bureau of Kaohsiung City Government from April 2011 to April 2014, Director of Small and Medium Enterprise Credit Guarantee Fund of Taiwan from May 2011 to April 2014 and Secretary-General of Kaohsiung City Government from April 2014 to November 2015. He succeeded Ding Kung-wha as chair of the Financial Supervisory Commission in October 2016.
