= Yu Hsiao-cheng =

Taiwanese engineer

- 虞孝成

Deputy Chairperson of National Communications Commission of the Republic of China
- Incumbent
- Assumed office 2012
- Chairperson: Howard S.H. Shyr

Personal details
- Education: Chung Yuan Christian University (BS); Georgia Institute of Technology (MS, PhD)

Yu Hsiao-cheng (Chinese: 虞孝成; pinyin: Yú Xiàochéng) is a Taiwanese engineer. He was the Deputy Chairperson of the National Communications Commission (NCC) of the Executive Yuan.

== Education ==
Yu graduated from Chung Yuan Christian University with a bachelor's degree in electrical engineering in 1972. He then completed advanced studies in the United States, where he earned his master's degree and his Ph.D. in industrial engineering and systems engineering from the Georgia Institute of Technology in 1976 and 1981, respectively.

== NCC Deputy Chairmanship ==
=== NCC Deputy Chairperson Appointment ===
Yu, a professor at the National Chiao Tung University, was nominated by the Executive Yuan to the office title in May 2012. He was accused by the Democratic Progressive Party due to his dual ROC-US citizenship. However, he said that he would renounce his US citizenship once he was appointed to be the NCC Deputy Chairperson.
