= Chang Sheng-ford =

Taiwanese politician

- 張盛和
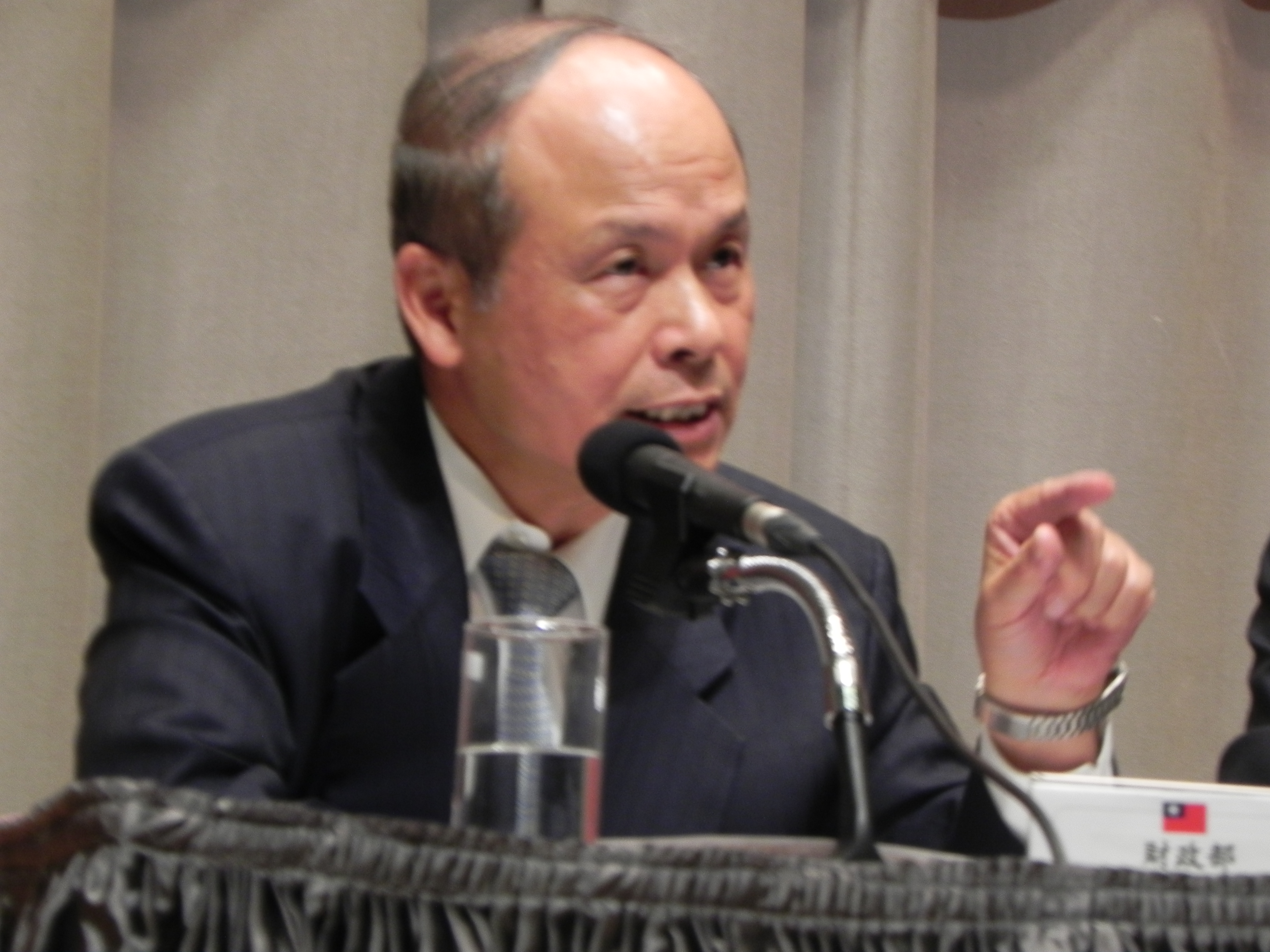

Minister of Finance
- In office 1 June 2012 – 20 May 2016
- Deputy: Tseng Ming-chung, Chang Pei-chih, Sheu Yu-jer; Wu Tang-chieh, Chang Pei-chih, Sheu Yu-jer; Wu Tang-chieh, Chang Fan, Sheu Yu-jer
- Preceded by: Christina Liu
- Succeeded by: Sheu Yu-jer

Political Deputy Minister of Finance
- In office 2008–2012
- Minister: Christina Liu

Administrative Deputy Minister of Finance
- In office 2007–2008
- Minister: Lee Sush-der

Personal details
- Born: 1 September 1949 (age 76) Taipei, Taiwan
- Party: Kuomintang
- Education: National Taiwan University (BA); National Chengchi University (MA); University of Iowa (MA)

Chang Sheng-ford (Chinese: 張盛和; pinyin: Zhāng Shènghuó; born 1 September 1949) is a Taiwanese politician who served as the Minister of Finance from 2012 to 2016.

== Minister of Finance ==
In early April 2013, Chang said that representative from banks in mainland China may soon be able to join the board of directors in Taiwanese financial institutions. However, this is only feasible if they do not exercise undue influence on management of the companies. He views this as merely a form of investment.
