= Wu Tang-chieh =

Taiwanese politician

- 吳當傑
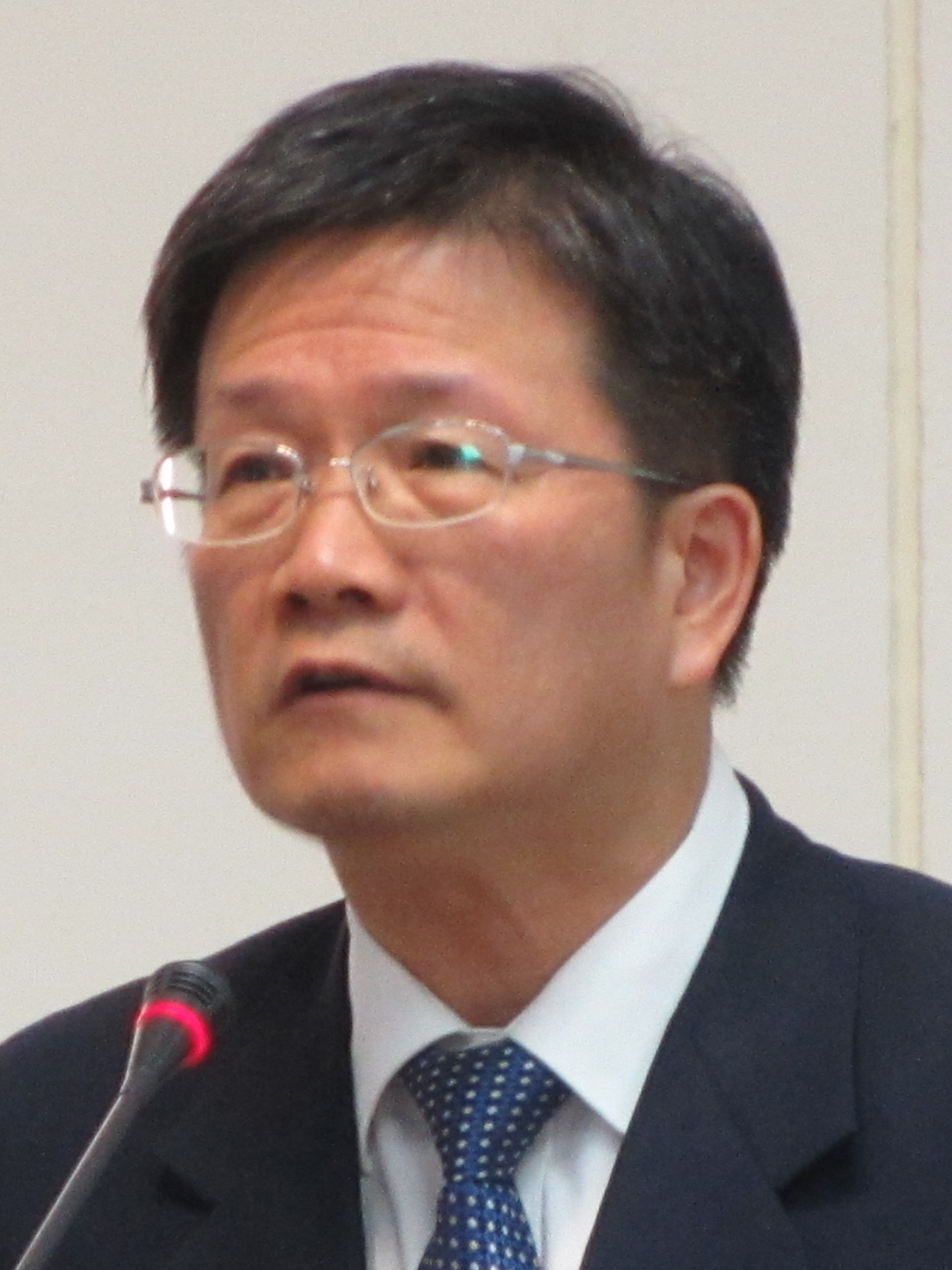

Political Deputy Minister of Finance of the Republic of China
- In office 2 September 2013 – 20 May 2016
- Minister: Chang Sheng-ford
- Preceded by: Tseng Ming-chung

Vice Chairperson of the Financial Supervisory Commission of the Republic of China
- Chairperson: Chen Yuh-chang
- Succeeded by: Huang Tien-mu

Personal details
- Education: National Chung Hsing University (BA); National Chengchi University (MA); University of Wisconsin–Madison (JD)

Wu Tang-chieh (Chinese: 吳當傑) is a Taiwanese politician. He was the Political Deputy Minister of Finance in the Executive Yuan from 2 September 2013 until 20 May 2016.

== Education ==
Wu graduated from National Chung Hsing University with a bachelor's degree in finance and taxation and earned a master's degree in finance from National Chengchi University. He then studied law in the United States at the University of Wisconsin–Madison, earning a Juris Doctor (J.D.) from the University of Wisconsin Law School.

== Financial Supervisory Commission vice chairperson ==
=== More fair and friendly Taiwan stock trading ===
In December 2012, Wu said that the ROC government aims to take measures in the coming year to make stock trading in Taiwan more fair and friendly. He elaborated that there are four plans to achieve the goal, which are increasing market momentum, diversifying quality financial products, cutting the trading costs and increasing international visibility.

With regards to the implementation of stock gains tax which was set to be effective starting on 1 January 2013, Wu said that the tax will not have a major impact on Taiwan's stock market.
