= Taxation Administration =

Government agency of the Republic of China

Coordinates: 25.034376°N 121.515513°E

- 財政部賦稅署

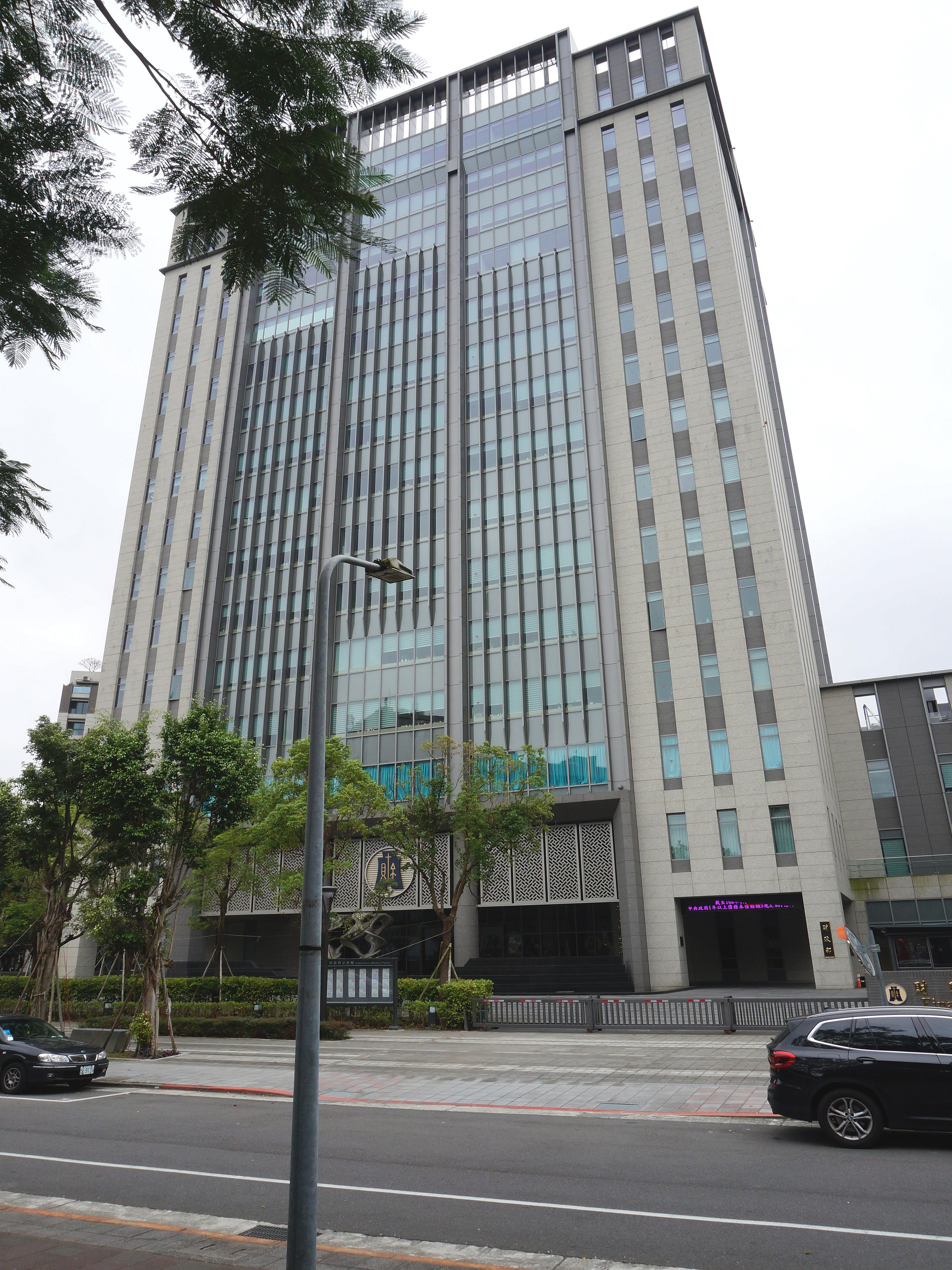
- Ministry of Finance Building

Agency overview
- Formed: May 1950
- Preceding agency: Taxation Agency
- Headquarters: Wenshan, Taipei, Taiwan
- Agency executive: Wu Tzu-hsin, Director-General
- Parent agency: Ministry of Finance
- Website: Official website

The Taxation Administration (DOT; traditional Chinese: 財政部賦稅署; simplified Chinese: 财政部赋税署; pinyin: Cáizhèngbù Fùshuìshǔ) is the agency of the Ministry of Finance of Taiwan (ROC) responsible for tax collections in Taiwan.

== History ==
The Taxation Administration was originally established as Taxation Agency in May 1950.

== Responsibilities ==
- Drafting, revising and interpreting inland tax regulations
- Planning, directing, supervising and evaluating the levy and collection of national tax administrations and local tax administrations
- Directing, supervising and evaluating the anti-corruption efforts of all levels of tax administration
- Auditing of major tax evasion cases, and supervising and evaluating the audit performance of all levels of tax administration
- Planning and evaluating matters relating to tax administration, and tax information
- Promoting tax-related education and publicity campaigns

== Organizational structure ==
- Income Tax Division
- Consumption Tax Division
- Property Tax Division
- Inspection Division
- Tax Auditing Division
- Tax Collection Administrative Division
- Secretariat
- Personnel Office
- Civil Service and Ethics Office
- Accounting and Statistics Office

== Transportation ==
NTA is accessible from Jingmei Station of the Taipei Metro.

== See also ==
- Ministry of Finance (Taiwan)
