= Chang Pei-chih =

Taiwanese politician

- 張佩智

Political Deputy Minister of Finance of the Republic of China
- Minister: Chang Sheng-ford
- Succeeded by: Chang Fan

Personal details
- Education: National Taiwan University (BA, PhD)

Chang Pei-chih (Chinese: 張佩智; pinyin: Zhāng Pèizhì) is a Taiwanese politician. He was the Political Deputy Minister of Finance until 17 February 2014.

== Finance Political Deputy Ministry ==
=== Resignation ===
Chang resigned from his political deputy ministry on 17 February 2014 for health reasons.

== See also ==
- Ministry of Finance (Republic of China)
