= Sheu Yu-jer =

Taiwanese politician (1952–2020)

- 許虞哲

Minister of Finance
- In office 20 May 2016 – 16 July 2018
- Deputy: Su Jain-rong, Chuang Tsui-yun (political); Wu Tzu-hsin (administrative)
- Preceded by: Chang Sheng-ford
- Succeeded by: Su Jain-rong

Administrative Deputy Minister of Finance
- In office 2013 – 20 May 2016
- Minister: Chang Sheng-ford
- Succeeded by: Wu Tzu-hsin

Personal details
- Born: 27 October 1952
- Died: 15 February 2020 (aged 67)
- Education: National Chengchi University (BA, MA); Harvard University (LLM)

Sheu Yu-jer (Chinese: 許虞哲; pinyin: Xǔ Yúzhé; 27 October 1952 – 15 February 2020) was a Taiwanese politician who served as the Minister of Finance from 20 May 2016 until 16 July 2018.

== Education ==
Sheu received his bachelor's degree in finance and taxation from National Chengchi University, where he was a classmate of Lin Chuan, and also earned a master's degree in the subject from the university. He then completed graduate studies in the United States at Harvard University, where he earned his Master of Laws (LL.M.) degree from Harvard Law School.

== Career ==
Sheu served within the Ministry of Finance as director-general of the Taxation Agency. By 2013, he was deputy finance minister under Chang Sheng-ford. Sheu was appointed finance minister by Premier Lin Chuan on 15 April 2016. He was replaced by Su Jain-rong in July 2018. Sheu then led the Taiwan Futures Exchange. He died on 15 February 2020, aged 67.
