= Hsu Yu-hsiu =

Taiwanese judge (born 1956)

Member of the Council of Grand Justices
- In office 3 October 2003 – 30 September 2011
- Nominated by: Chen Shui-bian

Personal details
- Born: 1956 (age 68–69)
- Education: National Chengchi University (LLB, LLM); University of Freiburg (PhD)

Hsu Yu-hsiu (Chinese: 許玉秀; pinyin: Xǔ Yùxiù; born 1956) is a Taiwanese jurist who served on the Council of Grand Justices from 2003 to 2011.

== Education and career ==
Hsu completed her bachelor's and master's degrees, both in law, at National Chengchi University. She then earned her doctorate in law in Germany at the University of Freiburg. Upon her return to Taiwan, Hsu began teaching law at Tunghai University, then joined the faculty of National Chengchi University. In 2003, President Chen Shui-bian nominated Hsu to the Council of Grand Justices. She was confirmed by the Legislative Yuan and took office on 3 October 2003. Hsu authored Constitutional Interpretation No. 666, issued by the court on 6 November 2009 regarding the penalization of prosecution, which opined in part that selling sexual services was a matter of free choice of profession, which is a right protected by the Constitution. Hsu left the position at the end of her eight-year term on 30 September 2011, as did three other justices: Hsu Pi-hu, Hsu Tzong-li, and Lin Tzu-yu. They were replaced by Chen Be-yue, Huang Hsi-chun, Lo Chang-fa, and Tang Teh-chung.

After leaving the Judicial Yuan, Hsu taught law at National Taiwan University. Concurrently, Hsu began developing the Constitutional Court Stimulation, teaching its first courses at the Taipei Bar Association in 2013. The Constitutional Court Stimulation was formalized as a class at National Chiao Tung University in 2014. In its first iteration, the Constitutional Court Stimulation argued same-sex marriage in Taiwan. By its third meeting in 2016, the Constitutional Court Stimulation had attracted the participation of legal scholars from Australia, Chile, Colombia, Kazakhstan, and South Africa, as it focused on cases from Taiwan's White Terror era. In June 2016, Hsu presented the Tang Prize in rule of law to Louise Arbour. Later that year, the Awakening Foundation proposed that Hsu be renominated to the Judicial Yuan. That November, Hsu was appointed to the Preparatory Committee for National Conference on Judicial Reform. She was also a member of its successor, a national affairs conference on judicial reform that began operations in February 2017. Within the conference, she served as subcommittee leader. In 2017, Hsu opined that court rulings and related documents should be written in a more understandable manner. She later argued against an effort to recall legislator Huang Kuo-chang. In July 2019, Hsu hosted the Asian Human Rights Court Simulation to urge the formation of a regional human rights court. The Asian Human Rights Court Simulation has reconvened to hear cases relating to human rights in Taiwan, such as that of Chiou Ho-shun.
