= Chang Fan =

Taiwanese economist

- 張璠

Political Deputy Minister of Finance of the Republic of China
- In office 17 February 2014 – 20 May 2016
- Minister: Chang Sheng-ford
- Preceded by: Chang Pei-chih

Personal details
- Education: Chung Yuan Christian University (BS); National Chung Hsing University (MS); National Chengchi University (PhD)

Chang Fan (Chinese: 張璠; pinyin: Zhāng Fán) is a Taiwanese economist. He was the Political Deputy Minister of Finance since 17 February 2014 until 20 May 2016.

== Education ==
Chang obtained his bachelor's degree in science from Chung Yuan Christian University. He then obtained his master's degree in urban and regional planning from National Chung Hsing University and earned a Ph.D. in land economics from National Chengchi University.

== Political career ==
He formerly served as the section chief, specialist, deputy chief and chief of the Industrial Development Bureau of the Ministry of Economic Affairs. He also served as researcher, senior executive and senior secretary at the Legislative Yuan. He served as the deputy director-general of the National Property Administration of the Ministry of Finance where he made outstanding contributions to the public land development projects. He finally became the acting commissioner of the urban and rural development department of the New Taipei City Government.

== See also ==
- Ministry of Finance (Republic of China)
