= Julian Kuo =

Taiwanese political scientist and politician

Kuo Jeng-liang MLY
- 郭正亮
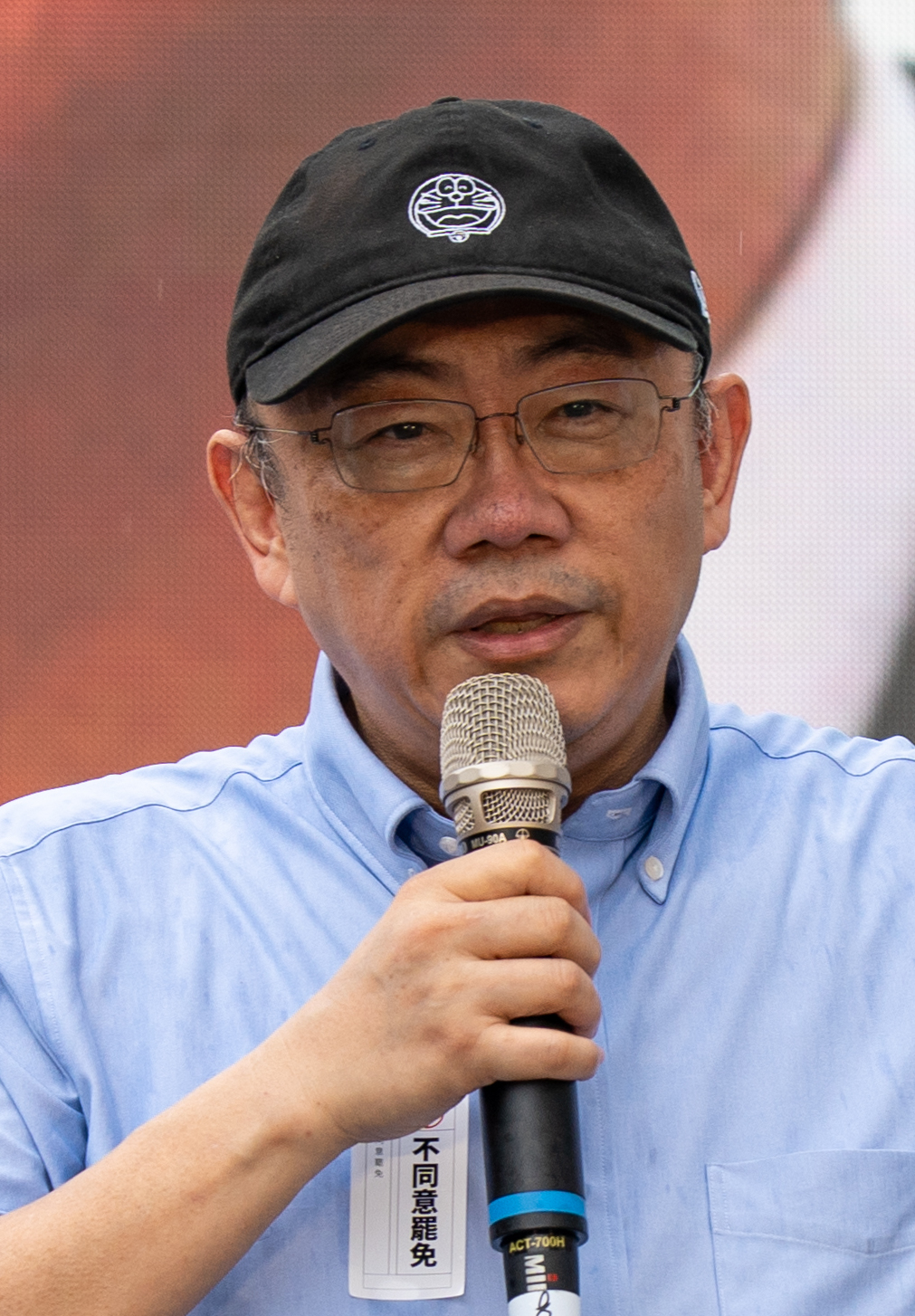
- Kuo in 2025

Member of the Legislative Yuan
- In office 2 September 2016 – 31 January 2020
- Preceded by: Wellington Koo
- Constituency: Republic of China
- In office 1 February 2002 – 31 January 2008
- Succeeded by: Justin Chou
- Constituency: Taipei 2

Personal details
- Born: 24 June 1961 (age 64) Kaohsiung, Taiwan
- Party: Democratic Progressive Party (until 2023)
- Education: National Taiwan University (BA, MA); Yale University (PhD)
- Profession: Political scientist

Kuo Jeng-liang (Chinese: 郭正亮; pinyin: Guō Zhèngliàng; born 24 June 1961), also known by his English name Julian Kuo, is a Taiwanese political scientist and politician who first served in the Legislative Yuan from 2002 to 2008 and was reappointed to the office from 2016 to 2020.

== Early life and education ==
Kuo was born on June 24, 1961, in Kaohsiung, Taiwan. His ancestral home is in Zhangzhou, Fujian. He graduated from Kaohsiung Municipal Senior High School.

After high school, Kuo graduated from National Taiwan University with a bachelor's degree in psychology in 1973, completed two years of military service, and earned a master's degree in sociology from the university in 1988. He then was awarded an Eisenhower Fellowship to complete doctoral studies in the United States, earning his Ph.D. in political science from Yale University in 1995. His doctoral dissertation, completed under James C. Scott, was titled, "The Reach of the party-state organizing local politics in Taiwan."

Upon receiving his doctorate, Kuo returned to Taiwan and began teaching political science at Soochow University in 1993.

== Political career ==
Kuo was a member of the Democratic Progressive Party's Formosa faction and later switched affiliations to the New Tide faction.

By 1998, Kuo became the executive director of the party's Policy Research and Coordinating Committee. After he had stepped down, Kuo and Lin Cho-shui proposed that the DPP amend its charter to recognize the Republic of China as Taiwan. The initiative failed, and no revisions were made. Shortly after Chen Shui-bian's election to the presidency in 2000, Kuo pushed for cross-party alliances and a coalition government to be formed. However, in 2001, Kuo stated that he was opposed to proposals that the Democratic Progressive Party form a coalition government, instead favoring a scenario in which the DPP disbanded and rewrote its party charter to attract a wider base before reregistering as a political party. Kuo was first elected to the Legislative Yuan later that year as a member of the DPP, due to the efforts the party had made to ensure a competitive vote distribution in northern Taiwan by asking supporters to vote for candidates based on the last number in voters' identification cards. In his first term Kuo backed a proposal to ban active politicians from owning media outlets and hosting programs. Kuo was tapped to defend the cross-strait relations referendum in March 2004, and faced Jaw Shaw-kong. In his successful December reelection bid, Kuo received NT$26.35 million in political donations, the third highest total of that electoral cycle. In 2006, Kuo skipped a party debate on China policy in protest, as the Chen administration had announced changes without reaching out to the Legislative Yuan. Kuo switched districts for the 2008 legislative elections, choosing to run in Taipei 3 against John Chiang, and lost.

No.	Candidate	Party	Votes	Ratio	Elected
1	John Chiang	Kuomintang	99,959	60.25%	
2	Li Lin Yao (李林耀)	Taiwan Constitution Association	128	0.08%	
3	Sie Fu Mi (謝馥米)	Taiwan Solidarity Union	1,854	1.12%	
4	Jian Ruei Kuan (簡瑞寬)	Taiwan Constitution Association	176	0.11%	
5	Julian Kuo	Democratic Progressive Party	63,773	38.44%	

When Taiwan signed the Economic Cooperation Framework Agreement with China in 2010, Kuo was named the spokesman of a DPP-convened committee against the agreement. Kuo participated in a primary for Taipei 2 in 2011, but was not selected as DPP candidate for the constituency. He was invited to speak at a political forum held in Hong Kong in August 2016, but authorities there denied him a visa. Kuo returned to the legislature in September, filling Wellington Koo's seat after Koo had resigned to lead the Ill-gotten Party Assets Settlement Committee.

After completing Koo's legislative term in 2020 Kuo stepped down. Kuo subsequently drew attention for criticizing the party on political television programs, announced his withdrawal from the party in May 2023, and was formally expelled in February 2024.

== Political stances ==
Kuo has stated "I'm culturally Chinese but politically not," described Lee Teng-hui's China policy as "fitful" and "reactive", reiterated support for continued dialogue between the two sides of the Taiwan Strait, and has repeatedly advocated for the Democratic Progressive Party to suspend Taiwan independence as a core value. These actions have led to characterization of his political beliefs as supportive of China, a description he regards as inaccurate.

Kuo has sharply criticized the Economic Cooperation Framework Agreement signed in 2010, calling it "a travesty of an agreement" that would leave Taiwan too economically dependent on China if the mainland forced other nations to back away from free trade agreements with Taiwan.

Kuo is an occasional contributor to the Taipei Times.
