= NTA =

NTA may refer to:

== Organizations ==
=== Government ===
- National Tax Agency, the official tax collecting agency of Japan
- National Testing Agency, government agency which conducts entrance examinations for higher educational institutions in India
- National Transport Authority (Ireland), the public transport licensing agency for Ireland
- National Treasury Administration, the agency of the Ministry of Finance in Taiwan
- National Treatment Agency for Substance Misuse, was a special health authority in England
- Nepal Telecommunications Authority
- Nigerian Television Authority, a government-owned broadcasting television network in Nigeria
- Northern Territory Administration, an Australian Government department prior to self-government

=== Other ===
- National Tax Association, a non-profit organization in United States
- National Telefilm Associates, was an independent film distribution company
- National Television Awards, a British awards ceremony
- Natural Science and Technical Academy Isny, a private German university
- Newark Teachers Association, a trade union in California, United States
- NTA Film Network, a former American television network
- Nuclei Territoriali Antimperialisti, an Italian terrorist group

== Other uses ==
- Nanoparticle Tracking Analysis, a method for visualizing and analyzing particles
- Native Title Act 1993, Australian federal legislation
- Neighborhood Tabulation Area, a geographical unit used for projecting demographics of New York City
- New Transatlantic Agenda, establishment of relations between the US and EU, agreed to in 1995.
- Newton Abbot railway station, Devon, England
- Nitrilotriacetic acid, an aminopolycarboxylic acid
