= Su Jain-rong =

Taiwanese economist

- 蘇建榮
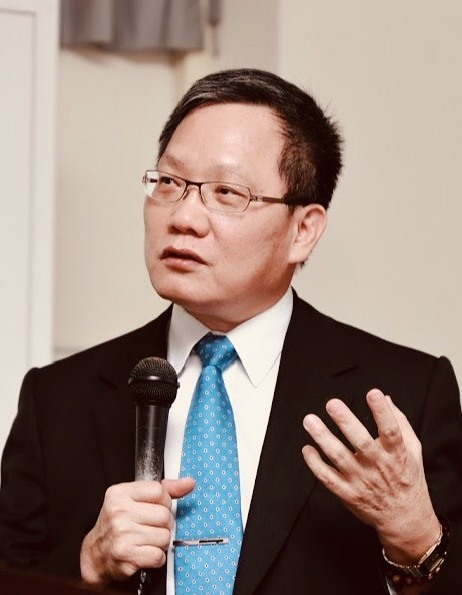

Minister of Finance
- In office 16 July 2018 – 25 December 2022
- Deputy: Chuang Tsui-yun (political), Wu Tzu-hsin (administrative)
- Preceded by: Sheu Yu-jer
- Succeeded by: Juan Ching-hwa (acting); Chuang Tsui-yun

Political Deputy Minister of Finance
- In office 20 May 2016 – 16 July 2018
- Minister: Sheu Yu-jer

Personal details
- Born: 12 November 1961 (age 64) Tianliao, Kaohsiung, Taiwan
- Education: Soochow University (BA); National Chung Hsing University (MA); Pennsylvania State University (PhD)

Su Jain-rong (Chinese: 蘇建榮; pinyin: Sū Jiànróng; born 12 November 1961) is a Taiwanese economist who served as the minister of Finance from 2018 to 2022.

== Education ==
Su graduated from Soochow University with a bachelor's degree in economics and earned a master's degree in economics from National Chung Hsing University. He then completed doctoral studies in the United States, earning his Ph.D. in economics from Pennsylvania State University in 1994. His doctoral dissertation, completed under economist Diane Lim, was titled, "Essays on tax revenue and lifetime tax incidence".

== Political careers ==
Su was appointed the Political Deputy Minister of Finance on 20 May 2016. On 12 July 2018, it was announced that Su would replace Sheu Yu-jer as the Minister of Finance starting on 16 July 2018.
