= Wu Tzu-hsin =

Politician from Taiwan

- 吳自心

Administrative Deputy Minister of Finance
- In office 20 May 2016 – May 2020
- Minister: Sheu Yu-jer; Su Jain-rong
- Preceded by: Sheu Yu-jer
- Succeeded by: Lee Ching-hua

Personal details
- Education: National Chengchi University (BA, MA)

Wu Tzu-hsin (Chinese: 吳自心; pinyin: Wú Zìxīn) is a Taiwanese politician. He has served as the Administrative Deputy Minister of Finance from 2016 to 2020.

== Education ==
Wu obtained his bachelor's and master's degrees in public finance from National Chengchi University.

== Political career ==
Wu was appointed as the Administrative Deputy Minister of Finance since 20 May 2016 until May 2020.
