= Chuang Tsui-yun =

Taiwanese politician

- 莊翠雲
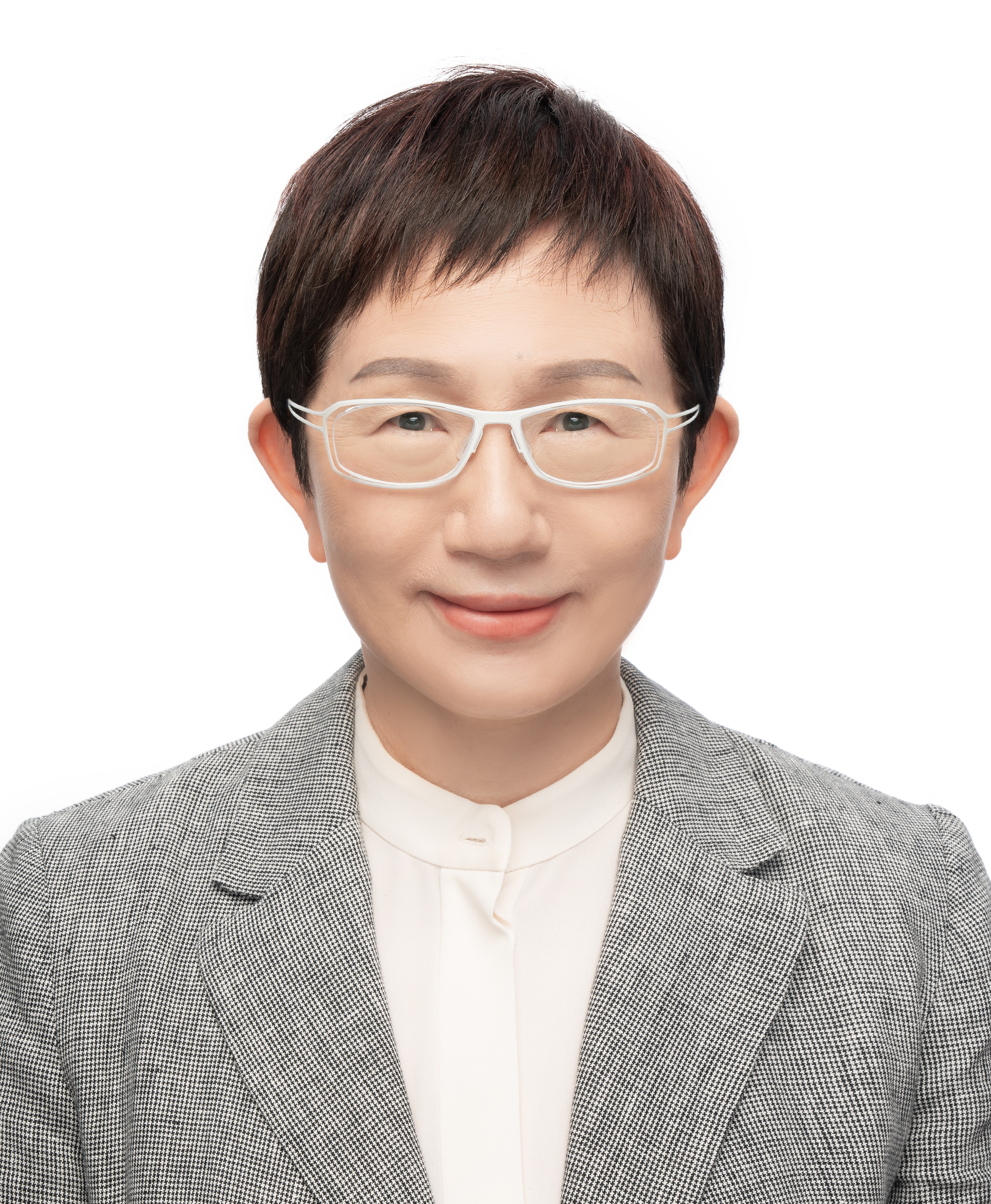
- Official portrait, 2023

33rd Minister of Finance
- Incumbent
- Assumed office 31 January 2023
- Premier: Chen Chien-jen; Cho Jung-tai
- Preceded by: Su Jain-rong; Juan Ching-hwa (acting)

Political Deputy Minister of Finance
- In office 20 May 2016 – 31 January 2023
- Minister: Sheu Yu-jer; Su Jain-rong

Personal details
- Party: Independent
- Education: National Chengchi University (BA)

Chuang Tsui-yun (Chinese: 莊翠雲; pinyin: Zhuāng Cuìyún) is a Taiwanese politician who has served as finance minister since 31 January 2023.

== Education ==
Chuang obtained her bachelor's degree in land economics from National Chengchi University.

== Political career ==
Chuang previously served as a deputy director of National Property Bureau, a division of the Ministry of Finance. In 2016, she was elevated to political deputy minister of the finance ministry, and in January 2023, was promoted to succeed Su Jain-rong as finance minister.

In May 2024, Chuang protested Taiwan's designation ("Taipei, China") at the Asian Development Bank. She led a delegation to the 2024 APEC finance ministers meetings in October 2024.
