= Chan Ting-i =

Taiwanese politician

Nicole Chan Chan Ting-i
- 詹婷怡
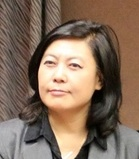

Chairperson of National Communications Commission of the Republic of China
- In office 1 August 2016 – 3 April 2019
- Preceded by: Howard S.H. Shyr
- Succeeded by: Chen Yaw-shyang (acting)

Personal details
- Born: 1968 (age 57–58)
- Education: National Taiwan University (LLB); University of London (LLM); National Chengchi University (MBA)

Chan Ting-i (Chinese: 詹婷怡; pinyin: Zhān Tíngyí) is a Taiwanese politician. She is also known by the name Nicole Chan.

== Early life and education ==
Chan's father, Chan Yi-chang, was a member of the Kuomintang and served on the Control Yuan. She attended law school at National Taiwan University, graduating with an LL.B. in 1990, then completed graduate studies in England at the University of London, where she earned a Master of Laws (LL.M.) in 1990. In 2008, she earned a Master of Business Administration (M.B.A.) from National Chengchi University.

== National Communications Commission ==
Chan became the chairperson of the National Communications Commission on 1 August 2016. She resigned the position on 3 April 2019.

== Later career ==
The Taiwan Network Information Center nominated Chan for a seat on the board of DotAsia Organisation. Voting was held in January 2020, and she was elected with the highest vote share.
