= Jan Brueckner =

American economist and university professor

Jan K. Brueckner
- Born: Berkeley, California, U.S.
- Occupations: Economist, academic, author and researcher
- Awards: Richard Musgrave Prize, National Tax Association; Fellow, Regional Science Association International; Walter Isard Award, North American Regional Science Council; John M. Quigley Medal, American Real Estate and Urban Economics Association; Fellow, Air Transport Research Society

Academic background
- Education: University of California, Berkeley (BA); Stanford University (PhD)

Academic work
- Institutions: University of California, Irvine, 2005-present University of Illinois at Urbana-Champaign, 1976-2005
- Doctoral students: Lin Chuan

Jan K. Brueckner is an American economist, academic, author and researcher. He is a Distinguished Professor of Economics at the University of California, Irvine. Brueckner has published over 150 papers. His research interests fall into areas encompassing urban economics, public economics, and real estate finance. He has also worked extensively in the field of industrial organization, focusing particularly on the economics of the airline industry. He is also the author of a textbook entitled Lectures on Urban Economics.

Brueckner is a fellow of the Regional Science Association International, and of the Air Transport Research Society. He served as editor of the Journal of Urban Economics from 1991 until 2007.

== Education ==
Brueckner received his A.B. degree in economics from the University of California, Berkeley, in 1972. He then enrolled at Stanford University and earned a doctoral degree in economics in 1976.

== Career ==
Following his doctoral studies, Brueckner joined the University of Illinois at Urbana-Champaign and subsequently worked there as Assistant and associate professor, before becoming a full professor in 1985. In late 1990s, he held concurrent appointments at the Institute of Government and Public Affairs, and as Distinguished Professor of Economics, before joining the University of California as a professor of economics in 2005. In 2015, he was appointed as Chancellor's Professor, and later on became a Distinguished Professor of Economics in 2018 at the University of California, Irvine.

Brueckner also held several visiting appointments in his career. He has served as visiting professor at UC Santa Barbara and UC San Diego, and has been a visiting scholar at many foreign universities, including Sapienza University of Rome, Charles University, Aix-Marseille University, City University of Hong Kong, University of British Columbia, Einaudi Institute of Economics and Finance, and Universite du Maine.

== Research ==
Brueckner has focused his research on urban economics, public economics, industrial organization, and real estate finance. His research works regarding social interaction in the suburbs, airline bag fees, airline fuel efficiency, and the job effects of airport downsizing have been featured in the press several times. He has provided theoretical motivation regarding spatial econometric examination of strategic interactions among local governments, and is one of the first to demonstrate the usage of economic theory in producing spatial econometric model specifications.

=== Urban and public economics ===
In his studies of urban economics, Brueckner discussed urban spatial expansion and regarded it a consequence of three powerful forces: a growing population, rising incomes, and falling commuting costs. He studied market failures that can disrupt the allocation of land between agricultural and urban uses, justifying criticism of urban sprawl, and provided remedies in context of the market failures. He also provided unified treatment of the Muth-Mills version of the urban model, and described its implications regarding intracity spatial variation of specific urban variables. In 2008, he examined the premises of Putnam's argument that low-density living reduces social capital and social interaction. While employing spatial econometric methods, he investigated property-tax competition among local governments and provided an estimation of the reaction function of a representative community, linking a community's property-tax rate to its own characteristics and to the tax rates in competing communities. He also showed that choosing local public spending to maximize property values leads to economic efficiency, and discussed the relationship between airline traffic and employment in US metropolitan areas.

=== Real estate finance ===
Brueckner evaluated mortgage-market equilibrium in a situation when borrower default costs are private information. He also analyzed the portfolio choices of homeowners, focusing on the investment constraint introduced by Henderson and Ioannides (1983). Furthermore, he explored the problem of optimal space allocation in shopping centers in the presence of inter-store externalities.

=== Airline economics ===
Brueckner provided some of the first economic analysis of airline hub-and-spoke networks and pioneered the analysis of international airline alliances, showing that they reduce fares for passengers connecting between two airlines. In analyzing airport congestion, he was among the first to argue that airlines internalize a portion of the congestion they create, ameliorating part of the congestion externality. More recently, he has studied airline emissions, and product unbundling in the airline industry, showing how bag fees affect airfares.

== Awards and honors ==
- 2001 - Richard Musgrave Prize, National Tax Association (with Luz A. Saavedra)
- 2002 - Award for Excellence in Graduate Teaching, University of Illinois at Urbana-Champaign
- 2005 - Fellow, Regional Science Association International
- 2008 - Walter Isard Award, North American Regional Science Council
- 2015 - John M. Quigley Medal, American Real Estate and Urban Economics Association
- 2018 - Fellow, Air Transport Research Society

== Bibliography ==
=== Books ===
- Lectures on Urban Economics (2011) ISBN 9780262016360

=== Selected articles ===
- Brueckner, J. K. (1987). The structure of urban equilibria: A unified treatment of the Muth-Mills model. Handbook of regional and urban economics, 2(20), 821–845.
- Brueckner, J. K., Thisse, J. F., & Zenou, Y. (1999). Why is central Paris rich and downtown Detroit poor?: An amenity-based theory. European economic review, 43(1), 91–107.
- Brueckner, J. K. & W.T. Whalen (2000). The price effects of international airline alliances. Journal of Law and Economics, 43(2), 503–546.
- Brueckner, J. K. (2000). Urban sprawl: diagnosis and remedies. International regional science review, 23(2), 160–171.
- Brueckner, J. K. & Saavedra, L. A. (2001). Do local governments engage in strategic property—tax competition?. National Tax Journal, 54(2), 203–229.
- Brueckner, J. K. (2002), Airport congestion when carriers have market power. American Economic Review 92(5), 1357–1375.
