= List of assets owned by the Kuomintang =

The Kuomintang (KMT), also known as the Chinese Nationalist Party, is a political party active in the Republic of China (Taiwan) (ROC). It has purportedly been among the world's most wealthiest political parties. In recent years much attention, whether deemed necessary or not, has been paid to the party's businesses and real estate. Claims have been made by party rivals that a number of its assets were obtained illegally while the KMT ruled Taiwan under a one-party system. However, in recent years, the party has been hit with multiple financial and legal difficulties.

The KMT's total assets are said to total nearly NT$40 billion but most of the party's capital was tied in enterprise and real estate, and not as cash.

== Kuomintang-owned Enterprises ==
Media

- Central Daily News
- China Daily News

Hospitality

- Palasia Hotel

== See also ==
- Ill-gotten Party Assets Settlement Committee (CIPAS)
- Period of mobilization for the suppression of Communist rebellion
- Temporary Provisions against the Communist Rebellion
- Martial law in Taiwan
- White Terror in Taiwan
- Transitional Justice Commission (TJC)
