= Godtone =

Taiwanese Twitch streamer and YouTuber

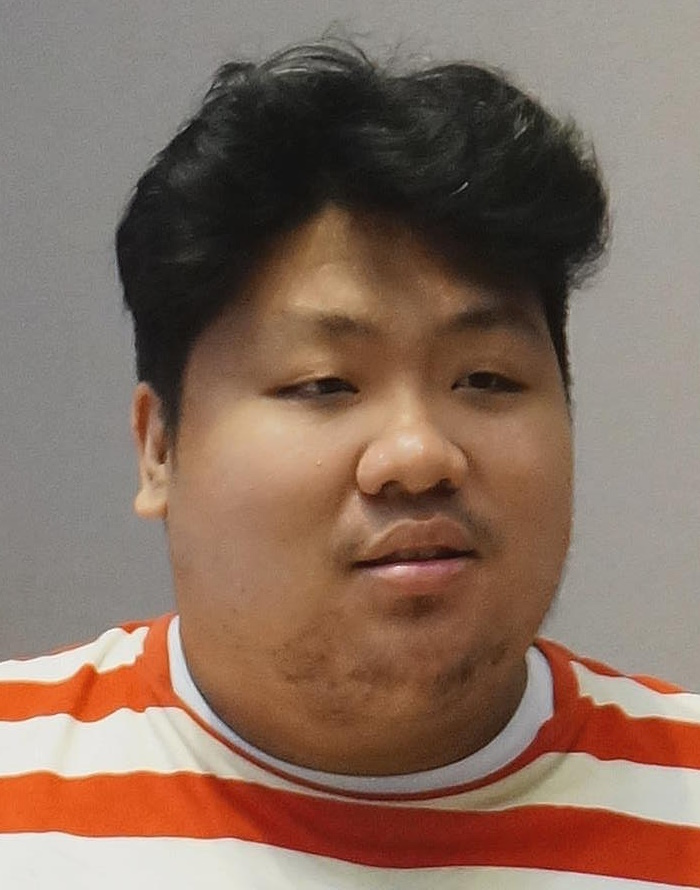
- Chang in 2019
- Born: Chang Chia-hang
- Education: Chung Yuan Christian University

Twitch information
- Channel: asiagodtonegg3be0
- Years active: 2013–present
- Genre: Video gaming
- Followers: 557,000

YouTube information
- Channel: Godtone&PowerRoger (統晨大戲院)
- Subscribers: 259,000
- Views: 202 million

Esports career information
- Game: League of Legends
- Playing career: 2023–2024
- Role: Jungle

Team history
- 2023–2024: Hell Pigs

Chinese name
- Traditional Chinese: 張嘉航
- Simplified Chinese: 张嘉航
Transcriptions
Standard Mandarin
- Hanyu Pinyin: Zhāng Jiāháng
- Tongyong Pinyin: Chang Chia-hang

Asiagodtone
- Traditional Chinese: 亞洲統神
- Simplified Chinese: 亚洲统神
Transcriptions
Standard Mandarin
- Hanyu Pinyin: Yǎzhōu Tǒng Shén

Godtone
- Traditional Chinese: 統神
- Simplified Chinese: 统神
Transcriptions
Standard Mandarin
- Hanyu Pinyin: Tǒng Shén

Chia-hang Chang (Chinese: 張嘉航), better known as Godtone (統神), is a Taiwanese Twitch streamer and YouTuber known for his blunt and impassioned commentary. He is a frequent subject of internet memes, most notably "Godtone carrying hot pot". He debuted in 2013 as a League of Legends streamer and occasionally plays the game professionally as a jungler for Hell Pigs, a team which he founded and owns.

== Career ==
Chang first starting live streaming League of Legends on Twitch in February 2013. His screen name is a combination of the character for barrel (桶), a reference to the in-game character Gragas and is mistakenly typed as a different character (統), and the character for deity (神). At his peak in 2015, Chang was one of the most-watched Twitch streamers in Taiwan, drawing around 10,000 viewers per stream. He once held the rank of "Challenger" on the Taiwanese server, which the highest tier of players, and participated in several esports tournaments.

In 2017, Chang started a YouTube channel to upload vlogs, but the channel gained little attention in the beginning; meanwhile, his popularity on Twitch decreased. In 2020, Chang left Twitch and started streaming on a new platform, Lang Live.

In July 2021, Chang collaborated with Toyz in a livestream to promote the mobile game Moonlight Blade Mobile (天涯明月刀M). The two engaged in several of in-game battles, most of which Chang lost. As a punishment for losing, Chang was told to change his in-game name to "Toyz's Dog", who became enraged and refused to do so. After the event, Toyz posted a highlight reel from the livestream, which further angered Chang. The two continued to argue over the Internet, and Chang claimed that he felt disrespected by Toyz's taunts throughout the stream.

In April 2024, in response to Mickey Huang's child pornography scandal, Chang commented that he believed the scandal was not a serious matter and that he would like to have sex with minors as well. After the comment, several companies terminated their collaboration with Chung. His YouTube channel was also terminated. On the other hand, Justin Wu (吳崢) and Miao Poya criticised Chung's comment, and had debated with him.

== "Godtone carrying hot pot" ==
"Godtone carrying hot pot" (統神端火鍋) is an internet meme that circulated in early 2021. The video depicts a man who looks like Chang carrying a big pot, then slipping onto the ground and repeatedly saying "itai", the Japanese word for "painful". The original video is believed to be from Latin America. The meme was commonly used in a bait-and-switch manner that's similar to Rickrolling. Chang clarified that the man in the video is not him, but later parodied the video on social media.

== Legal issues ==
In 2013, Chang insulted a police officer and the moderator of the League of Legends board on the online forum PTT. In 2014, he appeared in court, where he was charged with slander and served a 2-year suspended sentence.

In 2016, Chang appeared on a Facebook page created to promote the mobile game The Legend of Heroes (超神英雄傳說), but the page was suspended by Facebook for unknown reasons. The game's developer, Wayi, refused to pay Chang the full amount for the job, claiming that Chang had a negative public image that led to poor publicity for the game. Chang sued Wayi, and a court ruled in his favor.

In 2019, Chang was involved in a traffic accident in Zhonghe District, New Taipei, and a video surfaced of Chang engaging in a heated argument with eight men. Chang's fans subsequently doxxed the other men and flooded their workplaces with negative reviews online; meanwhile, Chang urged his fans to be rational. A police investigation found that Chang was not at fault, and one of the other men was charged with defamation.

== Personal life ==
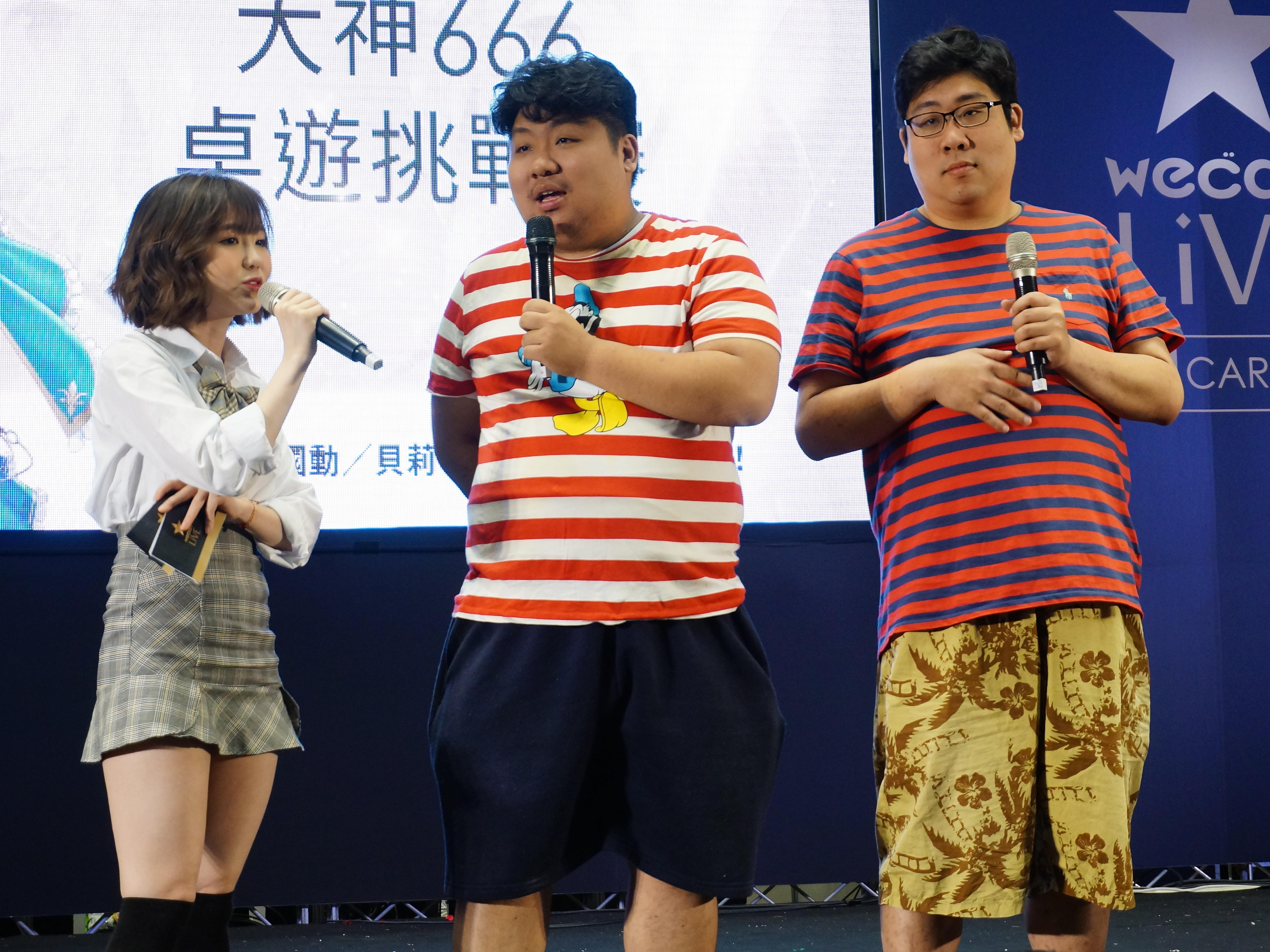
Chang (center) and his older brother (right) at a video game expo.

Chang is a graduate of Chung Yuan Christian University. His older brother, Wei-hang Chang is also a video game live streamer that plays under the screen name Guodong (國動). Chang married his former agent in 2015, and his wife frequently appears in his YouTube vlogs. Chang has two children.
