= Ho Chih-chin =

Taiwanese economist (1952-2016)

- 何志欽
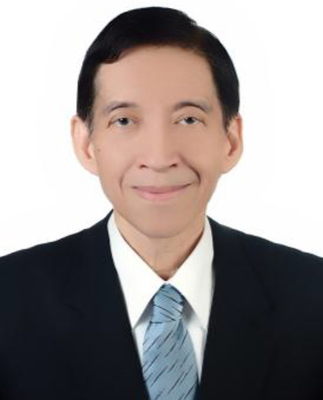

Minister of Finance
- In office 4 July 2006 – 13 March 2008
- Preceded by: Joseph Lyu
- Succeeded by: Lee Ruey-tsang (acting); Lee Sush-der

Personal details
- Born: 16 June 1952 Taipei, Taiwan
- Died: 8 November 2016 (aged 64) Taipei, Taiwan
- Education: National Taiwan University (BA); University of Michigan (PhD)

Ho Chih-chin (Chinese: 何志欽; pinyin: Hé Zhìqīn; 16 June 1952 – 8 November 2016) was a Taiwanese economist who served as the Minister of Finance from 2006 to 2008.

== Education ==
Ho was born on June 16, 1952, in Taipei, Taiwan, to a family affiliated with the Kuomintang. His parents were Dr. Ho Jen-Ching and Hsiao Ten-Hsin, and he had a sister, Ho Li-Chin. His grandfather, Ho Wei (何蔚), was the first justice of the Judicial Yuan.

After high school, Ho studied economics at National Taiwan University, where he was a classmate of Chen Shui-bian. After graduating with a bachelor's degree in 1974, he pursued doctoral studies in the United States, earning his Ph.D. in economics in 1987 from the University of Michigan. His doctoral dissertation, completed under economists Robert M. Stern and Alan Deardorff, was titled, "Determinants of U.S. Interregional Trade Patterns: An Empirical Assessment (United States)".

== Early career ==
After receiving his doctorate from the University of Michigan, Ho worked for the United States Department of the Treasury. In 2003, he returned to Taiwan to teach at National Taiwan University.

== Ministry of Finance ==
After the resignation of incumbent Finance Minister Joseph Lyu was approved by Premier Su Tseng-chang on 29 June 2006, Ho was appointed to the ministerial post and assumed the position on 4 July. During his term in office, Ho reformed the consolidated income tax and estate and gift tax systems. After multiple resignation attempts, Ho himself left office in 2008, notifying Su's successor Chang Chun-hsiung of his intentions on 13 March.

== Later career and death ==
Ho was appointed the President of National Taipei University in August 2015. He died on 8 November 2016 at National Taiwan University Hospital, aged 64.
