= Cheng Cheng-mount =

Taiwanese economist

- 鄭貞茂

Vice Chairperson of Financial Supervisory Commission of the Republic of China
- In office 1 November 2016 – August 2018
- Chairperson: Lee Ruey-tsang; Wellington Koo
- Preceded by: Kuei Hsien-nung
- Succeeded by: Chang Chuang-chang

Personal details
- Education: National Taiwan University (BA); University of Wisconsin–Madison (MA)

Cheng Cheng-mount (Chinese: 鄭貞茂; pinyin: Zhèng Zhēnmào) is a Taiwanese economist who served as the Vice Chairperson of Financial Supervisory Commission since 1 November 2016.

== Education ==
Cheng graduated from National Taiwan University in 1985 with his bachelor's degree in economics and earned a master's degree in economics from the University of Wisconsin–Madison in the United States in 1989.

== Careers ==
He was the assistant research fellow at Taiwan Institute of Economic Research in 1998–2002, chief economist at Citibank Taiwan in 2002–2012, adjunct assistant professor of Department of Finance of National Chengchi University in 2011, president of Academy of Banking and Finance in 2012–2015 and president of Agricultural Bank of Taiwan in 2015–2016. On the 1st of October 2020, Mr. Cheng Cheng-Mount was elected chairman of the Taiwanese shipping carrier Yang Ming Marine Transport Corporation.
