= Howard S.H. Shyr =

Taiwanese politician

Shyr Shyr-hau
- 石世豪

Chairperson of National Communications Commission of the Republic of China
- In office 1 August 2012 – 31 July 2016
- Deputy: Yu Hsiao-cheng
- Preceded by: Herng Su
- Succeeded by: Chan Ting-I

Deputy Chairperson of National Communications Commission of the Republic of China
- In office 22 February 2006 – 31 August 2008
- Deputy: Liou Tzong–der
- Chairperson: Su Yeong-chin
- Preceded by: Position established
- Succeeded by: Chen Cheng-chang

Personal details
- Education: National Taiwan University (LLB, LLM); University of Hamburg (PhD)

Shyr Shyr-hau (Chinese: 石世豪; pinyin: Shí Shìháo), also known by his English name Howard S.H. Shyr, is a Taiwanese lawyer. He was the Chairperson of the National Communications Commission (NCC) of the Executive Yuan from 2012 to 2016.

== Education ==
Shyr obtained his bachelor's and master's degrees in law from National Taiwan University in 1988 and 1992, respectively. He then obtained his doctoral degree from Hamburg University in Germany.

== NCC Ministry ==
=== Telecoms carrier user complaints ===
At the end of May 2013, speaking at the Legislative Yuan, Shyr said that the NCC would release ranked lists of telecommunication carrier companies based on their level of customer complaints in the first quarter of 2013. This decision was made to encourage the telecommunication companies to improve their service.
