= Joseph Lyu =

Taiwanese banker and politician (born 1956)

Lyu Jye-cherng
- 呂桔誠
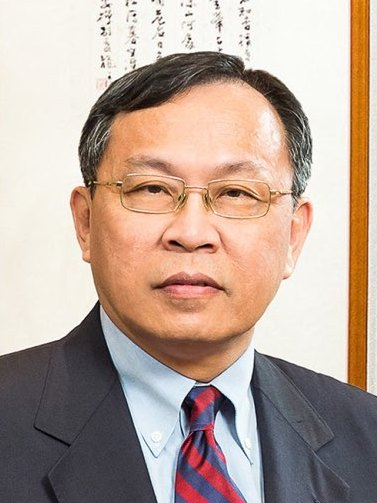

Chairman of Taiwan Financial Holdings Group
- In office 20 May 2016 – 3 February 2023
- Preceded by: Catherine Lee
- Succeeded by: Shen Jong-chin

Minister without Portfolio
- In office 4 July 2006 – September 2006
- Prime Minister: Su Tseng-chang

26th Minister of Finance
- In office 25 January 2006 – 3 July 2006
- Prime Minister: Su Tseng-chang
- Preceded by: Lin Chuan
- Succeeded by: Ho Chih-chin

Personal details
- Born: 15 December 1956 (age 69)
- Education: National Chengchi University (BA); Northwestern University (MA)

Lyu Jye-cherng (Chinese: 呂桔誠; born 15 December 1956), also known by his English name Joseph Lyu, is a Taiwanese business executive and politician.

== Education ==
Lyu graduated from National Chengchi University with a bachelor's degree in banking in 1979. He then earned a Master of Business Administration (MBA) from Northwestern University in 1989. He then studied government at Harvard University as a senior fellow at the Harvard Kennedy School.

== Career ==
Lyu worked for BNP Paribas and the Bank of New York Mellon, among other institutions. In July 2000, while serving as the vice president of KBC Bank in Taiwan, he accepted an appointment to the China Airlines board of directors. By 2002, Lyu was the vice chairman of the Commission of National Corporations, a division of the Ministry of Economic Affairs. In this position, he acted as the commission's spokesman, announcing several moves involving state-owned enterprises. Lyu was named to the board of the China Aviation Development Foundation (CADF) in June 2002. At the time, CADF held a majority of shares in China Airlines. After Mao Chi-kuo stepped down as chairman of Chunghwa Telecom in January 2003, Lyu was considered a potential successor. However, Lyu remained at the Commission of National Corporations for a time. Later that year, Lyu left both the Commission of National Corporations and China Airlines. In June 2004, Lyu succeeded Chen Mu-tsai as chairman and president of the Bank of Taiwan. Concurrently, Lyu also served on an economic advisory committee led by Lin Hsin-i. During his tenure, the merger of the Bank of Taiwan with the Central Trust of China was approved.

In January 2006, Lyu was appointed finance minister, replacing Lin Chuan. Lyu took office on 25 January 2006. Lyu left the cabinet in September to chair King's Town Bank. In January 2008, Lyu became the chairman of Mega Financial Holding Company. Wang Rong-jou replaced Lyu in July. In August 2016, Lyu was named to a government taskforce convened to probe the New York branch of Mega International Commercial Bank. Later, Lyu returned to Taiwan Financial Holding, and the Bank of Taiwan as chairman.
