= Lee Sush-der =

Taiwanese financier (born 1951)

- 李述德
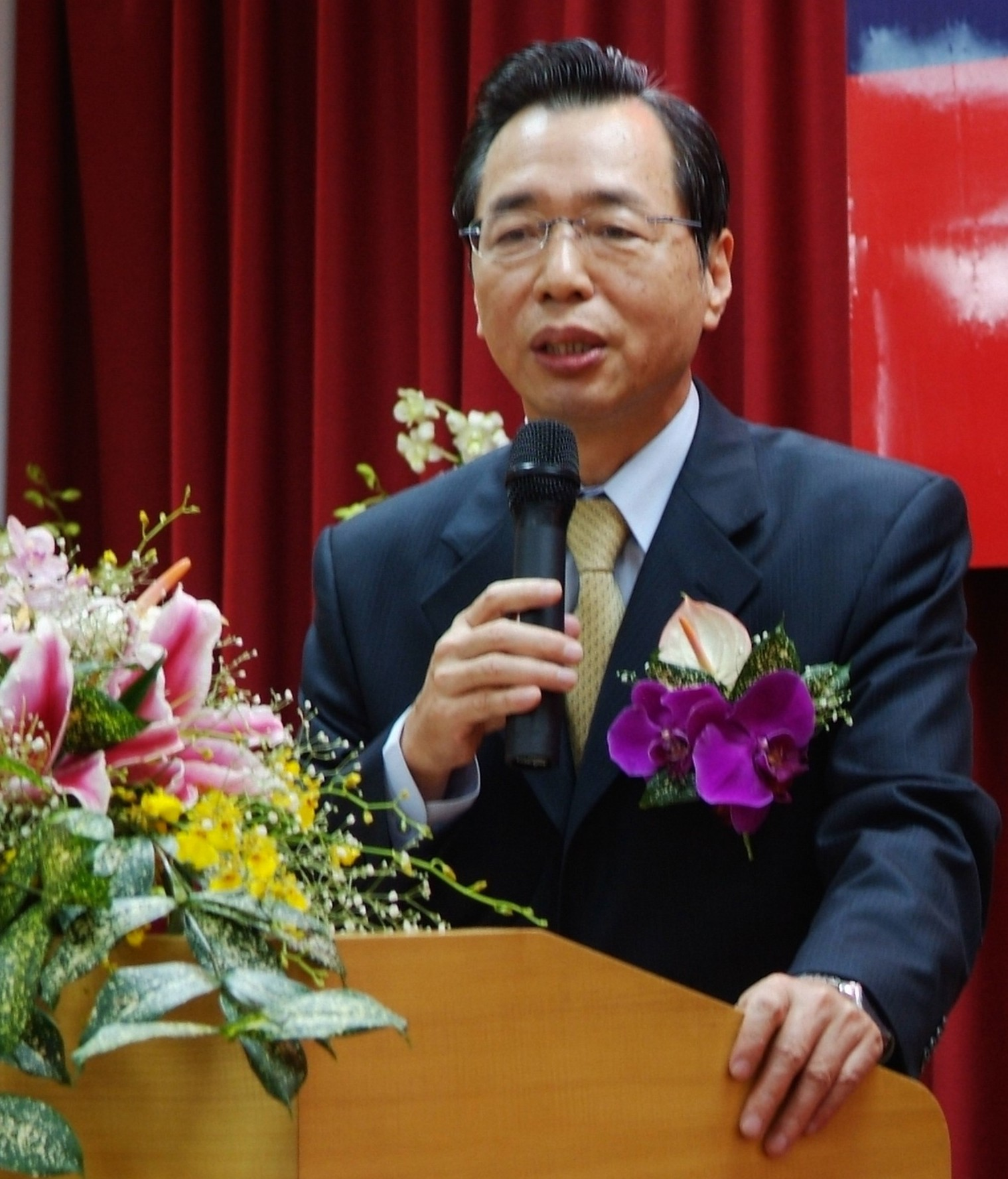

Minister of Finance
- In office 20 May 2008 – 6 February 2012
- Preceded by: Ho Chih-chin; Lee Ruey-tsang (acting)
- Succeeded by: Christina Liu

Personal details
- Born: 29 November 1951 (age 74) Taipei, Taiwan
- Education: Tamkang University (BA); Minnesota State University, Mankato (MBA)

Lee Sush-der (Chinese: 李述德; pinyin: Li Shùdé; born 29 November 1951) is a Taiwanese financier. He is currently the president of the Taiwan Stock Exchange. He was the Minister of Finance from 2008 to 2012. Lee has also served in the Taipei and Kaohsiung city governments.

== Education ==
After graduating from National Changhua Commercial Vocational High School, Lee studied business at Tamkang University and graduated with a Bachelor of Arts (B.A.) specializing in insurance. He then earned a Master of Business Administration (M.B.A.) from Minnesota State University, Mankato, in the United States.
