= National Treasury Administration =

Government agency of the Republic of China

National Treasury Administration of the Republic of China
- 國庫署
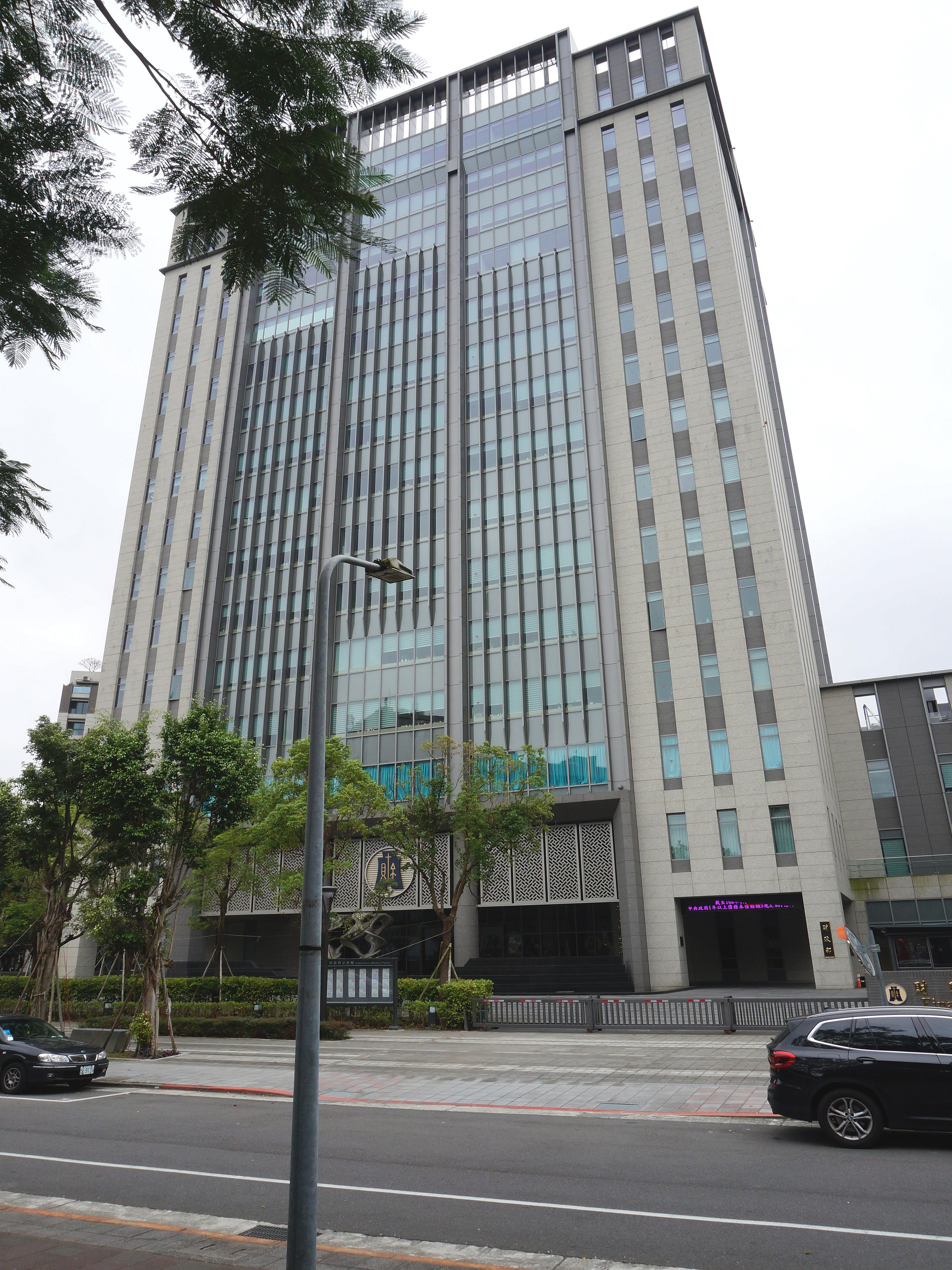
- Ministry of Finance Building

Agency overview
- Formed: 26 March 1940
- Preceding agency: Department of National Treasury
- Jurisdiction: Taiwan
- Headquarters: Wenshan, Taipei; 25.034376°N 121.515513°E
- Agency executive: Hsiao Chia-chi, Director-General
- Parent agency: Ministry of Finance
- Website: Official website

The National Treasury Administration (NTA; traditional Chinese: 財政部國庫署; simplified Chinese: 财政部国库署; pinyin: Cáizhèngbù Guókùshǔ) is the agency of the Ministry of Finance of Taiwan (ROC) in charge of relevant matters in the revenues, expenditures and management of the Treasury as well as responsible for the management of government debt, fiscal planning, public welfare lottery, and the management of public-owned enterprises.

== History ==
The National Treasury Administration was originally established as National Treasury Department under the Ministry of Finance in the early years of the Republic of China. On 26 March 1940, the department was then upgraded to National Treasury Administration and the Organizational Act of the National Treasury Administration was promulgated on the same day. At that time, the administration consisted of 4 sections and 1 office. On 10 February 1942, the organizational act was amended and promulgated which resulted in the expansion of the administration to become 6 sections and 2 offices. On 22 July 1981, the organizational act was amended and promulgated again.

== Organizational structure ==
- Treasury Affairs Management Division
- Treasury Disbursement Management Division
- Debt Management Division
- Financial Planning Division
- Government -Owned Shares Management Division
- Tobacco and Alcohol Management Division
- Secretariat
- Accounting and Statistics Office
- Personnel Office
- Civil Service Ethics Office
- Information Management Office

== Director-Generals ==
- Joanne Ling
- Hsiao Chia-chi

== Transportation ==
NTA is accessible from Jingmei of the Taipei Metro.

== See also ==
- Ministry of Finance (Taiwan)
