= Ill-gotten Party Assets Settlement Committee =

- 不當黨產處理委員會; Bùdāng Dǎngchǎn Chǔlǐ Wěiyuánhuì

Agency overview
- Formed: 31 August 2016
- Jurisdiction: Republic of China
- Headquarters: Zhongshan, Taipei
- Agency executives: Lin Feng-cheng, Chairperson; Shih Chin-fang, Vice Chairperson
- Parent agency: Executive Yuan
- Website: www.cipas.gov.tw

The Ill-gotten Party Assets Settlement Committee (CIPAS; Chinese: 不當黨產處理委員會; pinyin: Bùdāng Dǎngchǎn Chǔlǐ Wěiyuánhuì) is an independent government agency of Taiwan established in 2016 by the Act on Promoting Transitional Justice. It is responsible for the investigation and recovery of ill-gotten assets of political parties and their affiliated organizations obtained during the martial law period in Taiwan. All parties established before the lifting of martial law, 15 July 1987, are required to report their party assets to the committee. As the dominant party during the martial law period, the Kuomintang (KMT) and its affiliate organizations are the main targets of this investigation. The committee is headquartered in Zhongshan District, Taipei.

According to Article 7 of the Act on Promoting Transitional Justice, assets seized by the committee would be managed by the Promoting Transitional Justice Fund, and could be used to promote transitional justice, and to fund elder care and social welfare programs.

== History ==
The Act Governing the Handling of Ill-gotten Properties by Political Parties and Their Affiliate Organizations was passed in July 2016 and Wellington Koo, one of the main authors of the Act, was named as the committee chairman in August. He stepped down from the Legislative Yuan to take the appointment. Koo assumed the committee chairmanship despite the Kuomintang citing Article 20 of the Act, which requires nonpartisan committee members, in its objections to Koo's leadership. Koo named most of the committee members on 24 August, and the group was officially established on 31 August. With the establishment of the committee, the KMT has insisted that it has been illegally and unconstitutionally persecuted and that the investigation is a political witch hunt. However, the ruling Democratic Progressive Party (DPP) maintained that the means are necessary for achieving transitional justice and leveling the playing field for all political parties. In September 2017 Koo left the chairman post and was succeeded by Lin Feng-cheng.

In 2016, the KMT challenged the constitutionality of the law establishing the committee and its authority, arguing that the law prevented citizens from organizing political parties. On 28 August 2020, the Constitutional Court ruled that the committee was constitutional.

== Determinations and resulting actions ==
The committee has made several determinations.

=== Media companies ===
On October 9, 2018, the Central Motion Picture Corporation (CMPC) was determined to be an affiliate of the KMT, as the organization's official documents bore the words "party-run enterprise." The committee also argued that the Central Investment Holding Co., a KMT-owned enterprise, sold 82.5% of the CMPC's shares to KMT member Alex Tsai at below market value. The corporation's assets, valued at $11.8 billion NTD, were frozen.

On September 24, 2019, the Committee determined that the Broadcasting Corporation of China (BCC) was an affiliate of the KMT, ordering it to relinquish its 13 parcels of real estate to the state and pay $7.7 billion NTD in compensation for assets transferred to third parties or bought back by the government. The BCC had been sold to holding companies owned by chairman Jaw Shaw-kong in 2006 though via KMT-owned Hua Hsia Investment Holding Co. However, on August 27, 2024, the Taipei High Administrative Court ruled that the Broadcasting Corporation of China (BCC) had long been out of the possession and control of the KMT, and ruled to revoke the committee's punishment of $7.7 billion NTD. Jaw Shaw-kong, former chairman of BCC, said that he thanked the judge for “restoring the truth” and “clearing away the stigma of the BCC being a KMT affiliated organization”.

=== Investment companies ===
On November 25, 2021, the Taipei High Administrative Court ruled against the KMT in a lawsuit brought by the committee regarding its ownership of two investment firms and proceeds from the sale of a residential building together valued at about 16 billion NTD. On January 28, 2024, the government won a court ruling allowing it to take over the stocks of two companies, the Central Investment Company and Hsinyutai Company, which were declared to be ill-gotten assets by the committee in 2016.

=== Other affiliates ===
On August 7, 2018, the China Youth Corps (CYC) was determined to be an affiliated youth organization of the KMT. Its assets, valued at $5.6 billion NTD, were subsequently frozen, and the organization was required to declare its properties to the committee within four months. The CYC responded to the ruling arguing that it ceased to be a governmental organization in 1969.

On March 19. 2019, the National Women's League of the ROC (NWL) was determined to be an affiliate of the KMT. The organization was founded by Soong Mei-ling in 1950 to care for military families. The organization is set to forfeit most of its assets, valued at $38 billion NTD. The committee found that the KMT had helped the NWL obtain funding through a surcharge on imports over a period of 30 years, amounting to a total of $24 billion NTD. The NWL is challenging the determination in court. On April 27, 2020, the NWL was officially dissolved, and its Taipei property was determined to be public property. The League was given an option to become a political party, which it refused, and is still suing the government over the freezing of its funds. Its lawsuit was rejected in July 2021 and the National Property Administration is suing the NWL for continuing to occupy the building.

On April 26, 2020, the committee seized the balance of funds originally held by the Chinese Association for Relief and Ensuing Services, founded in 1961 by Chiang Kai-shek for hunger relief in China, which had closed in 2002 with a balance of $34.25 million NTD. The funds had been transferred to a private account in 2004. The committee held a hearing to determine whether the associated was affiliated with the KMT, and whether its funds were ill-gotten. The committee maintains that the relief efforts were government-driven, with the association merely responsible for management, and therefore did not have rights to the funds.

=== Real estate cases ===
- On September 1, 2019, the Committee determined that the KMT appropriated its first group of properties from the ROC government in April 1947, a package of 85 properties around Taiwan, many of which were later sold to private parties.
- On February 18, 2020, the Committee held a hearing to determine whether three KMT properties should be considered ill-gotten.
- On June 6, 2023, the committee determined that the KMT headquarters in Taichung was acquired improperly. The Taichung KMT was headquartered in the former City Hall up until 1985, when it requested $35 million NTD from the city to cover its relocation.
- On August 15, 2024, the Taipei High Administrative Court ruled that the former Daxiao Building in Taipei was not obtained improperly, and ruled that the committee must withdraw the punishment of $780 million NTD, and ruled that the KMT would win the case.
- On August 26, 2024, the Taipei High Administrative Court ruled that in the case of the former party headquarters of the KMT, the committee did not provide enough proof that the building was obtained improperly. The court hence ruled in favor of the KMT, and revoked the punishment of $1.1 billion NTD.

== Chairpersons ==
Democratic Progressive Party New Power Party

No.	Name	Term of Office		Days	Political Party	Premier
1	Wellington Koo (顧立雄)	31 August 2016	8 September 2017	373	Democratic Progressive Party	Lin Chuan
2	Lin Feng-cheng (林峯正)	8 September 2017	Incumbent	3256	New Power Party	William Lai; Su Tseng-chang II; Cho Jung-tai

== See also ==
- List of assets owned by the Kuomintang
- Transitional Justice Commission
