= Chiou Ho-shun case =

Murder case in Taiwan

- Traditional Chinese: 邱和順
- Simplified Chinese: 邱和顺
Transcriptions
Standard Mandarin
- Hanyu Pinyin: Qiū Héshùn

The Chiou Ho-shun case (Chinese: 邱和順案; pinyin: Qiū Héshùn àn) is one of the most well-known criminal cases in Taiwan. In September 1988, a group of 12 men, led by Chiou Ho-shun (born 1960), was arrested and detained for their murder of saleswoman Ko Hung Yu-lan and the kidnapping of schoolboy Lu Cheng. After 11 trials, in 2011, the Supreme Court reached a verdict that sentenced Chiou to death. The case has gained notoriety due to the lack of evidence connecting Chiou and the 11 to the murders, as well as the alleged tortures they received in order to force confessions. As of 2026, Chiou is the longest-serving death row inmate in Taiwan.

== Murders ==
On November 24, 1987, Ko Hung Yu-lan (柯洪玉蘭), an insurance saleswoman from Miaoli, disappeared. Her remains were found in a ditch in Zhunan. It was later revealed that Chiou and his group planned to rob her. They drove her to Chiou's house and demanded NT$500,000 from her. She refused, and Chiou strangled her to death with a rope. Afterwards, they took NT$130,000 from her, and disposed of her remains in a ditch.

On December 21, 1987, Lu Cheng (陸正), a schoolchild from Hsinchu City, was kidnapped by Chiou and his accomplices after leaving his cram school, as they believed Lu to be rich. The kidnappers called the child's parents and demanded a ransom of NT$5 million. Lu's parents negotiated and paid a ransom of NT$1 million, but Lu remained missing, and his remains were never found.

== Arrest and trial ==
It wasn't until almost a year after the murders that the police began to make headway with the case. In September 1988, an informant reported to the Taipei police that his nephew's friend was involved in the kidnapping of Lu Cheng. Later, the informant and his nephew stated that more people were involved with the Lu and Ko Hung murders, including Chiou. On September 29, the police arrested Chiou and 11 other people, some of which were underage.

In 1989, the Ko Hung murder and the Lu kidnapping were tried together, and the Hsinchu District Court sentenced Chiou to death. He was the only person in the 12-man group to be sentenced to death.

In 1994, two prosecutors and 10 police officers were given corrective measures for "coercion with violence". Four years later, in 1998, the court ruled that four of the officers were guilty of perjury and obstruction of justice.

However, Chiou remained on death row. On May 12, 2011, after the 11th retrial, the Taiwan High Court upheld Chiou's death sentence and deprived him of public rights for life. His appeal was rejected by the Supreme Court on July 28.

== Controversies ==
=== Torture ===
During questioning, Chiou and his accomplices were reportedly blindfolded, tied up, forced to sit on ice, subjected to electric shocks with an electric baton, and had water mixed with pepper poured into their mouths. Five or six officers beat Chiou to the point of passing out. Some interrogations lasted up to 10 hours. Chiou eventually gave 288 confessions to the murders of Ko Hung and Lu, but he later renounced his confessions, stating that they had been extracted over hours of torture. During his imprisonment, Chiou was also reported having to wear shackles that weighted 3 kilograms, a condition for all death row inmates, until the practice was ended in 2006.

=== Discrepancies ===
There are a number of discrepancies and a lack of evidence relating to the Chiou Ho-shun case. The defendants' testimonials and key details are inconsistent, and no evidence of a murder weapon has been brought to court. Instead, all evidence is based on the confessions of the defendants. For example, in the Lu Cheng murder, Chiou and others confessed that they targeted Lu because he was seen coming to school in a luxury car, while Lu's family testified that he went to school by bus the day he disappeared. In addition, Chiou was reported to be renting a car in Miaoli at the time of Lu's abduction.

In the Ko Hung murder, a plastic bag was found located near Ko Hung's body. Inside the bag contained butcher's knives, rectangular knives, women's leather shoes and men's underwear. The butcher's knife was originally connected to a pig butcher who owned Ko Hung gambling debts. When Ko Hung went missing, he admitted himself to a hospital for stab wounds. He abruptly left before his wounds were healed, and by the time the Zhunan police were close to arresting the man, it was announced that Chiou was the one who committed the murder, and no further action was taken. The rest of the contents in the bag, including the butcher's knife, were confiscated by the police and did not appear during the trial.

== See also ==
- Hsichih Trio: similar case in which its defendants were tortured in order to obtain confessions.
