= National Communications Commission =

Independent statutory agency of Taiwan

- 國家通訊傳播委員會; Guójiā Tōngxùn Chuánbò Weǐyuánhuì (Mandarin); Koet-kâ Thûng-sin Chhòn-pô Vî-yèn-fi (Hakka)

Agency overview
- Formed: 22 February 2006
- Jurisdiction: Taiwan
- Headquarters: Zhongzheng, Taipei
- Employees: 561
- Agency executives: Chen Yaw-shyang (陳耀祥), Chairperson; Wong Po-tsung (翁柏宗), Vice Chairperson
- Parent agency: Executive Yuan
- Website: www.ncc.gov.tw

The National Communications Commission (NCC; Chinese: 國家通訊傳播委員會; pinyin: Guójiā Tōngxùn Chuánbò Weǐyuánhuì; Pe̍h-ōe-jī: Kok-ka Thong-sìn Thôan-pò͘ Úi-oân-hōe) is an independent statutory agency of Executive Yuan of Taiwan responsible for regulating the development of the telecommunication and broadcasting industries, promoting competition and consumer protection, and regulating licensing, radio frequency and spectrum, programming content, communications standards and specifications in Taiwan. The NCC is considered to be Taiwan's equivalent of the Federal Communications Commission (FCC) in the United States, Ofcom in the United Kingdom and the Australian Communications and Media Authority (ACMA) in Australia. The current Chairperson is Chan Ting-I.

== History ==
The NCC is an independent statutory agency created on 22 February 2006 as a split from the Ministry of Transportation and Communications to regulate the information, communications and broadcasting industry in Taiwan.

NCC was tasked with the responsibility to ensure a level playing field in competition in the communications industry, consumer protection, privacy rights, and the development of universal service for remote and rural regions. It also develop new standards for emerging technologies that will improve access, lower cost and deliver services to remote areas.

In 2018, the National Communications Commission banned the use of BeiDou products in Taiwan without its approval and "asked related agencies to confiscate" such products if they are imported, used, or sold.

== Organizational structure ==
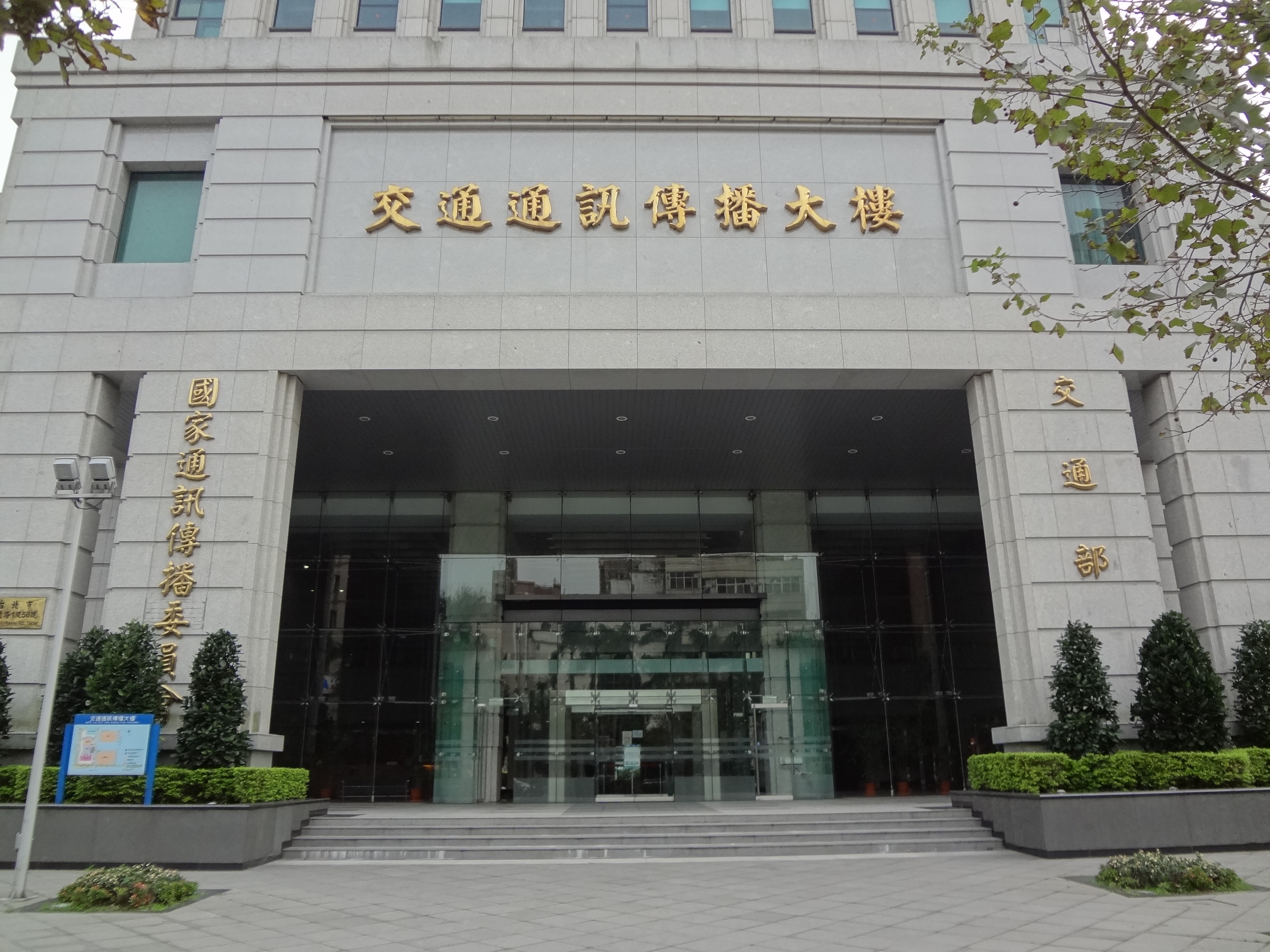
NCC Ren'ai Road headquarter office

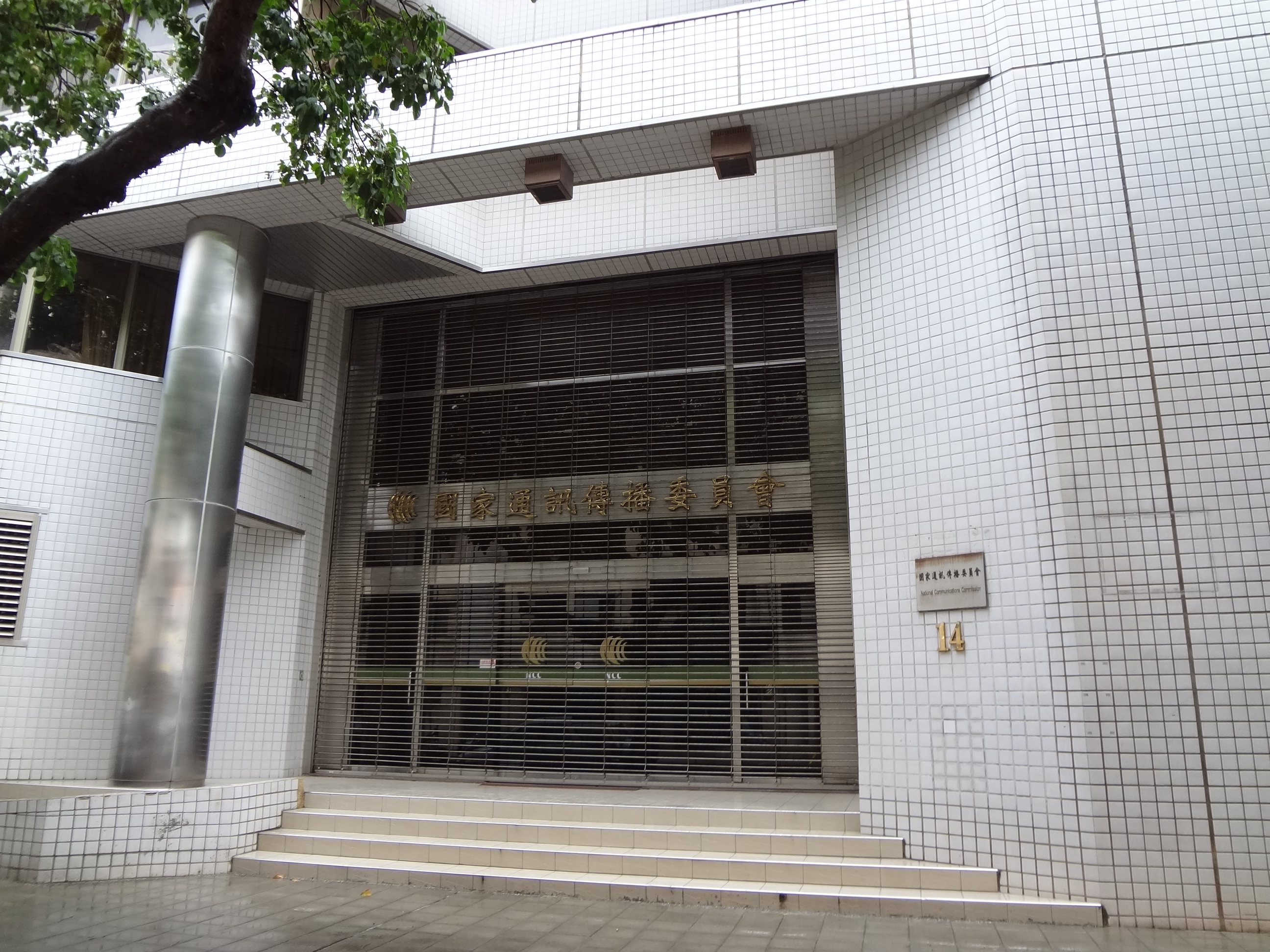
NCC Jinan Road headquarter office

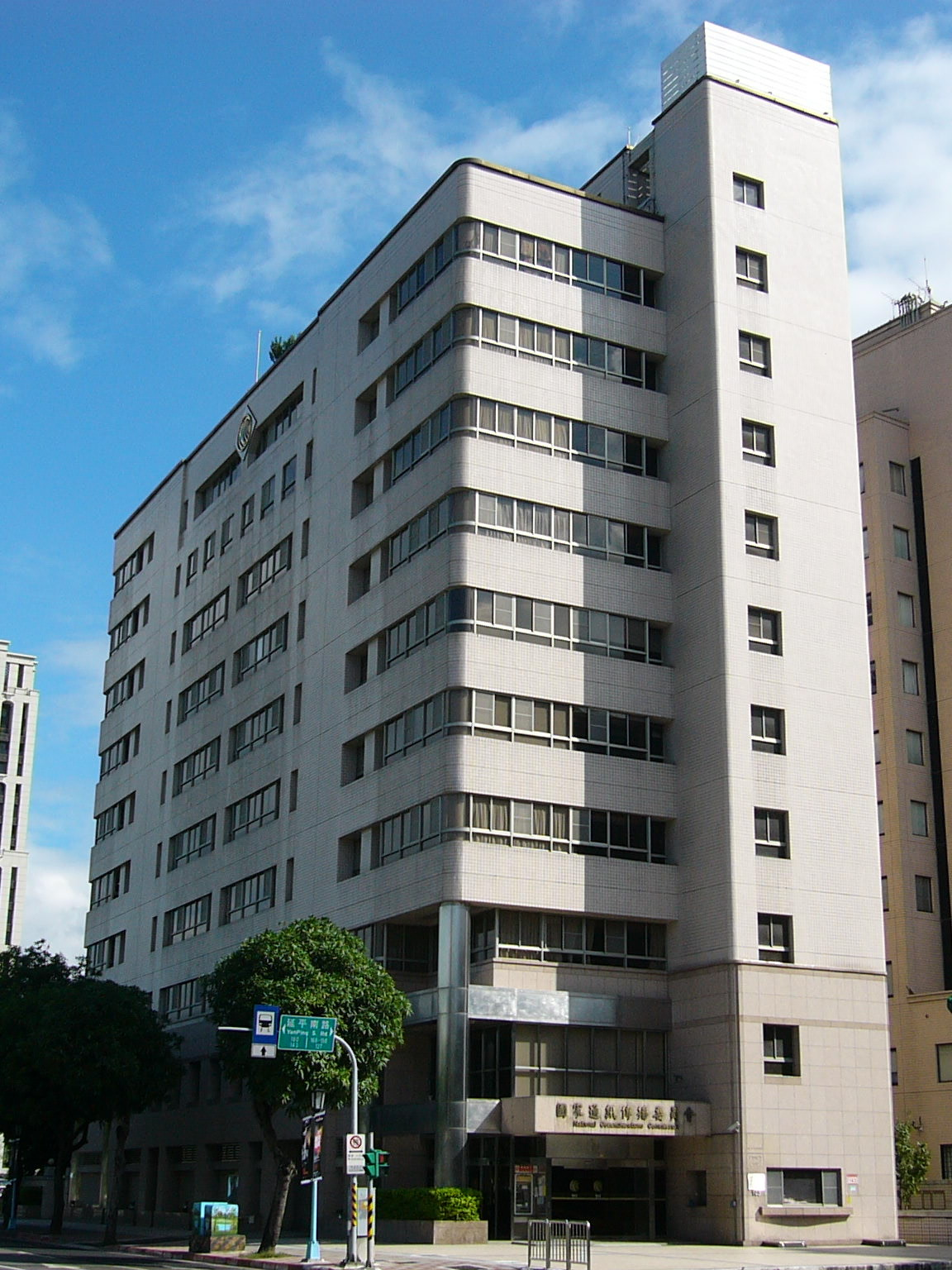
Northern Regional Regulatory Department

- Department of Planning
- Department of Telecommunications Administration
- Department of Television and Radio Administration
- Department of Resources and Technologies
- Department of Content Affairs
- Department of Legal Affairs
- Northern Regional Regulatory Department
- Central Regional Regulatory Department
- Southern Regional Regulatory Department
- Secretariat
- Personnel Office
- Budget, Accounting and Statistics Office
- Civil Service Ethics Office

== Chairpersons ==
- Su Yeong-chin (22 February 2006 - 31 July 2008)
- Bonnie Peng (1 August 2008 - 31 July 2010)
- Herng Su (1 August 2010 - 31 July 2012)
- Howard S.H. Shyr (1 August 2012 - 31 July 2016)
- Chan Ting-i (1 August 2016 - 3 April 2019)
- Chen Yaw-shyang (陳耀祥) (4 April 2019 - 31 July 2024)
- Weng Bo-zong (1 August 2024 - 31 November 2024)
- Chen Chongshu(1 December 2024 - 31 July 2026)
- Vacant (1 August 2026- )

== See also ==
- Executive Yuan
- Press Freedom Index
- Censorship in Taiwan
- Media of Taiwan
