= Lin Chuan =

Premier of Taiwan from 2016 to 2017

- 林全
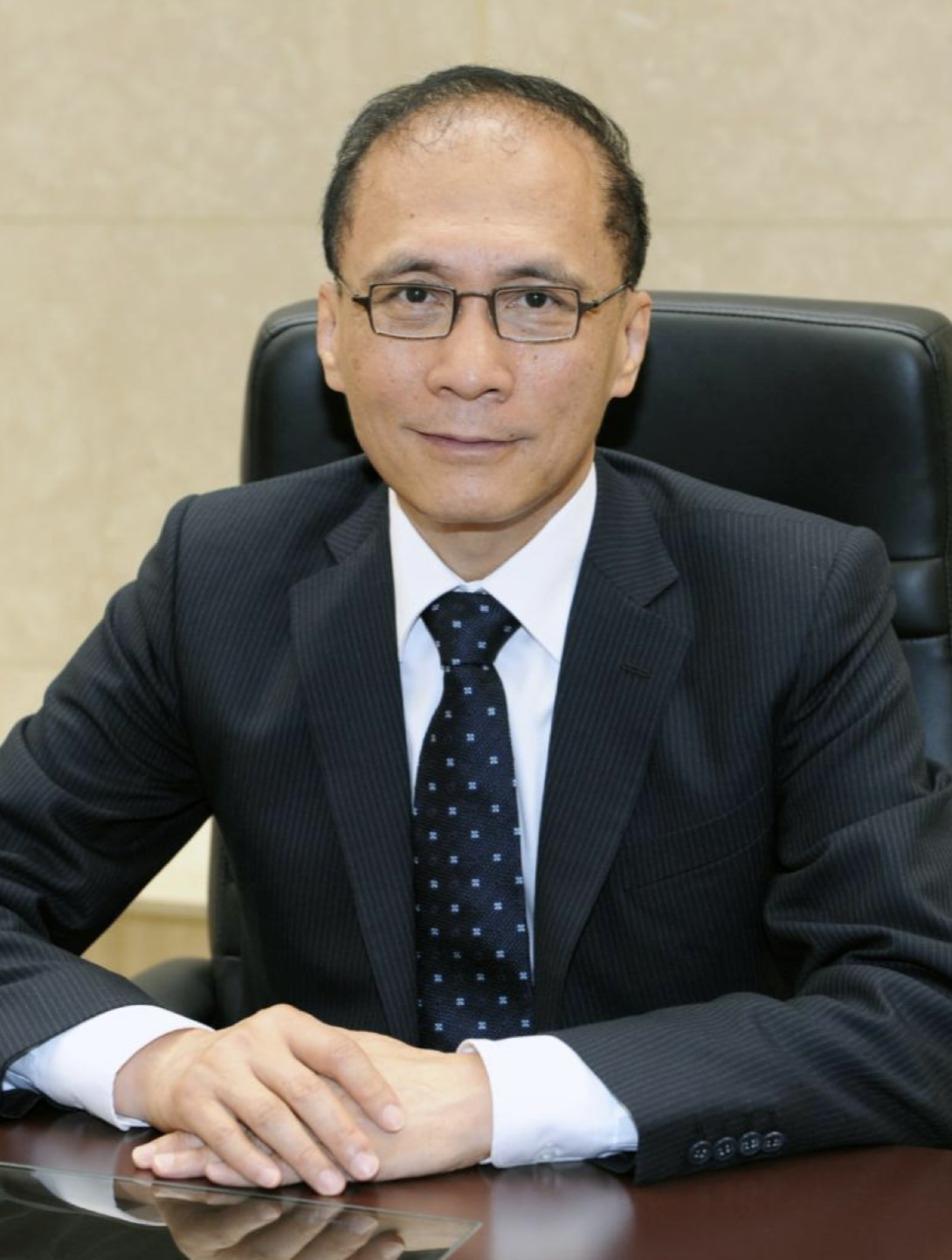
- Official portrait, 2016

Senior Advisor to the President
- Incumbent
- Assumed office 8 September 2017
- President: Tsai Ing-wen; Lai Ching-te

25th Premier of the Republic of China
- In office 20 May 2016 – 8 September 2017
- President: Tsai Ing-wen
- Deputy: Lin Hsi-yao
- Preceded by: Chang San-cheng
- Succeeded by: Lai Ching-te

21st Minister of Finance
- In office 2 December 2002 – 25 January 2006
- Prime Minister: Yu Shyi-kun; Frank Hsieh
- Preceded by: Lee Yung-san
- Succeeded by: Joseph Lyu

11th Minister of Budget, Accounting and Statistics
- In office 20 May 2000 – 2 December 2002
- Prime Minister: Tang Fei
- Preceded by: Wei Duan
- Succeeded by: Liu San-chi

Personal details
- Born: 13 December 1951 (age 74) Zuoying, Kaohsiung County, Taiwan
- Party: Independent
- Spouse: Wu Pei-ling (m. 2002)
- Children: 2 daughters
- Education: Fu Jen Catholic University (LLB); National Chengchi University (LLM); University of Illinois, Urbana-Champaign (MS, PhD)

Lin Chuan (Chinese: 林全; pinyin: Lín Quán; Wade–Giles: Lin² Chʻüan²; Pe̍h-ōe-jī: Lîm Choân; born 13 December 1951) is a Taiwanese economist, lawyer, and politician who served as the Premier of the Republic of China from 2016 to 2017. He was the first cabinet head under the Tsai Ing-wen government. Before his premiership, he had also served as the Minister of Budget, Accounting and Statistics and Minister of Finance during Chen Shui-bian's presidency.

== Early life and education ==
Lin was born in Kaohsiung to a waishengren family on 13 December 1951. His ancestral home is in Jiangsu and his family had ties with the Kuomintang. He graduated from Fu Jen Catholic University with a Bachelor of Laws (LL.B.) in 1974 and obtained a Master of Laws (LL.M.) from National Chengchi University in 1978. Lin then pursued graduate studies in the United States, earning his Master of Science (M.S.) in 1982 and his Ph.D. in economics from the University of Illinois at Urbana–Champaign in 1984. His doctoral dissertation, completed under economist Jan Brueckner, was titled, "The Incidence of the Property Tax."

== Career ==
He served as the Minister of the Directorate-General of Budget, Accounting and Statistics of the Executive Yuan from 2000 to 2002 and Minister of Finance from 2002 to 2006.

After stepping down as finance minister in 2006, Lin served on the board of multiple companies and led two think tanks. He also served within Taipei City Government as head of the city's finance department.

Following Tsai Ing-wen's victory in the 2016 presidential election, Lin was selected as a co-convener of Tsai's transition team set up to manage the transfer of power from the outgoing Ma Ying-jeou administration. Soon after his appointment to the transition team, Lin became the subject of national media speculation linking him to several government posts within the Tsai administration. In February 2016, Lin was chosen to lead a task force that explored the possibility of joining the Trans-Pacific Partnership.

=== Premiership (2016-2017) ===
On 15 March 2016, president-elect Tsai Ing-wen named Lin as the premier. He was confirmed by the Legislative Yuan soon after and took office on 20 May 2016. On 4 September 2017 he resigned as premier reportedly to bolster Tsai's declining popularity. Shortly after stepping down, Lin was awarded the Order of Propitious Clouds.

On 15 January 2018, Lin Chuan took over the Chairman of TTY Biopharm Company Limited.

== Personal life ==
Lin married Wu Pei-ling in September 2002 and has two daughters from a previous marriage.
