= Ministry of Finance (Taiwan) =

Government ministry of the Republic of China

- 財政部; Cáizhèngbù (Mandarin); Chhòi-chṳn Phu (Hakka)
- Emblem of the Ministry of Finance

- Seal of the Ministry of Finance (財政部印)

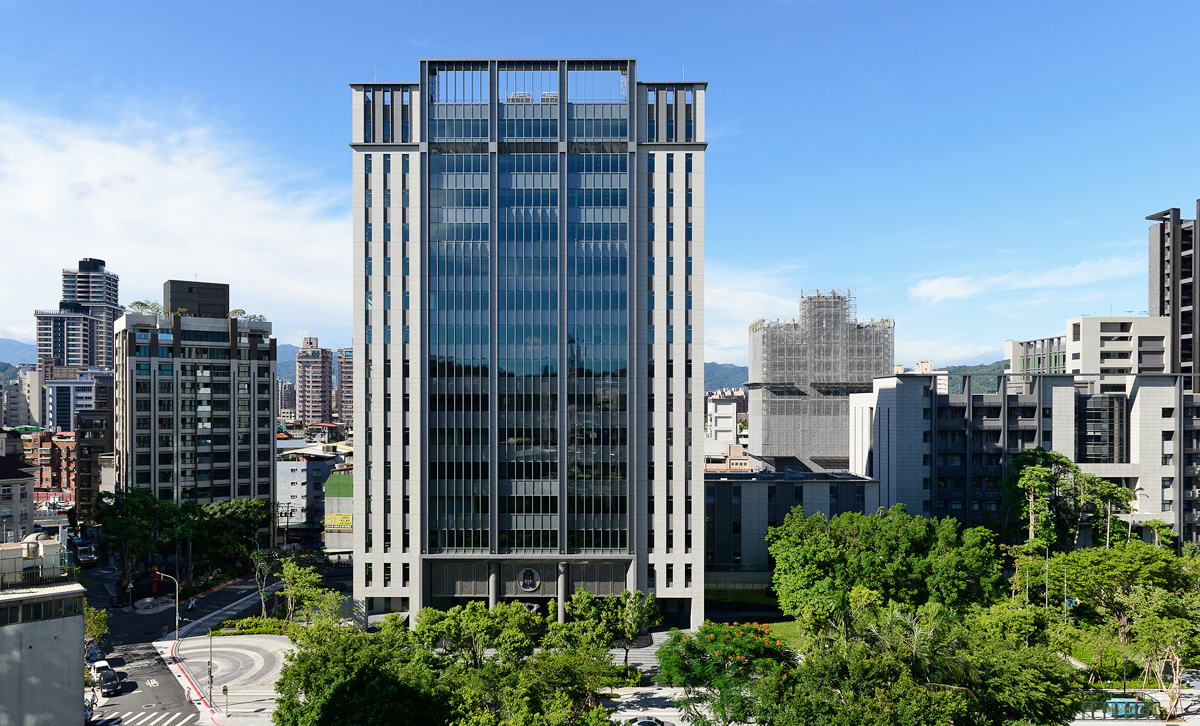
- Headquarters in Taipei

Agency overview
- Formed: March 1912
- Jurisdiction: Taiwan
- Headquarters: Wenshan, Taipei
- Minister responsible: Chuang Tsui-yun
- Agency executives: Dai Longhui, Secretary-General; Lee Ching-hua, Undersecretary; Ruan Ching-hua, Undersecretary
- Website: www.mof.gov.tw

The Ministry of Finance (MOF; Chinese: 財政部; pinyin: Cáizhèngbù; Pe̍h-ōe-jī: Châi-chèng-pō͘) is the ministry of the Republic of China (Taiwan) responsible for government revenue, taxation, treasury, government land properties, customs in Taiwan. The current minister is Chuang Tsui-yun.

The Ministry of Finance also manages the administration of government land, tobacco and alcohol, deposit insurance for banking customers and export-import banking services.

The Emblem of the Ministry of Finance depicts a spade money - an early type of coinage in ancient China. The Western Han dynasty's money spade is used, imprinted with the archaic variation of the word 財.

== Structure ==
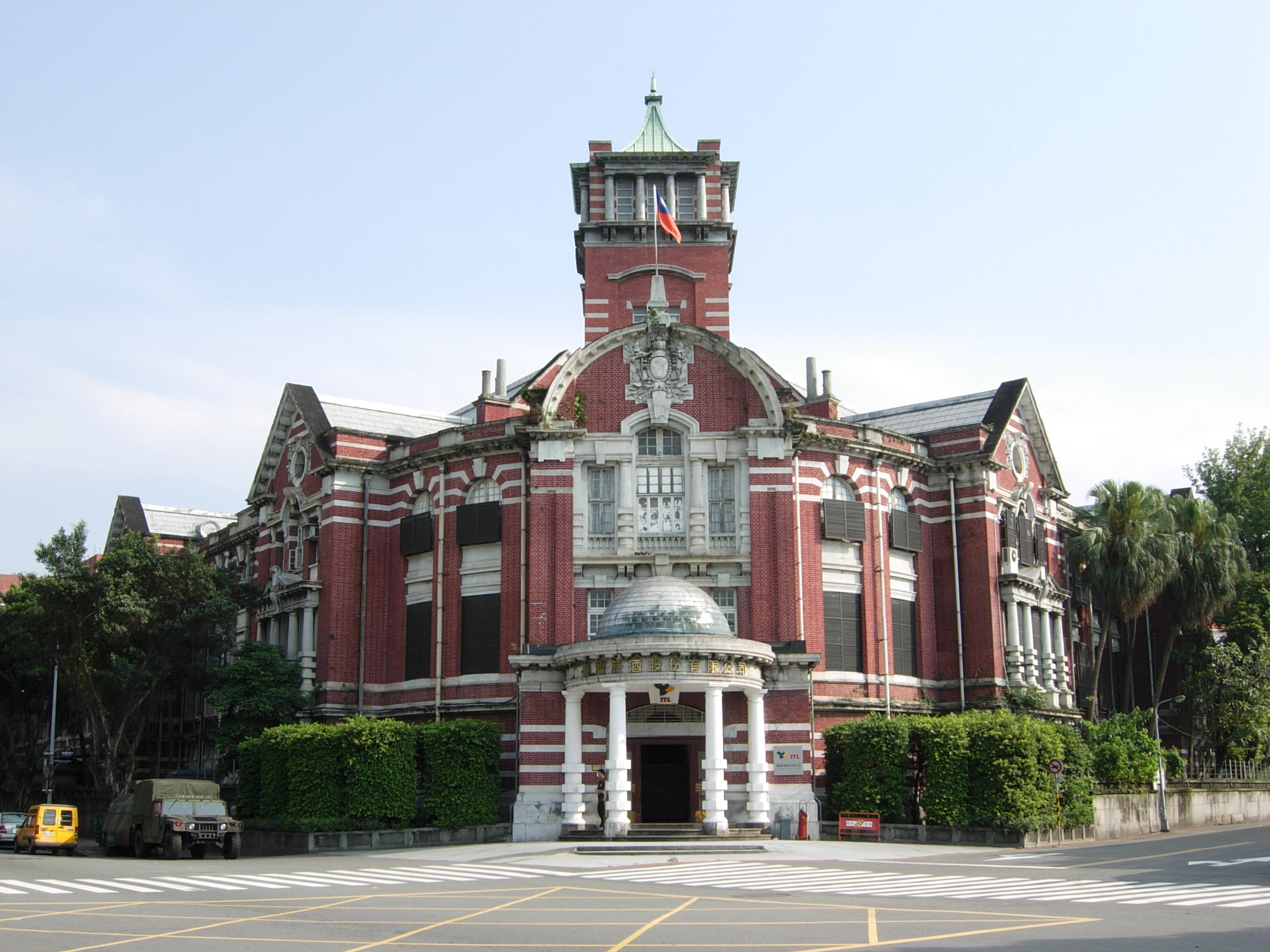
Taiwan Tobacco and Liquor Corporation

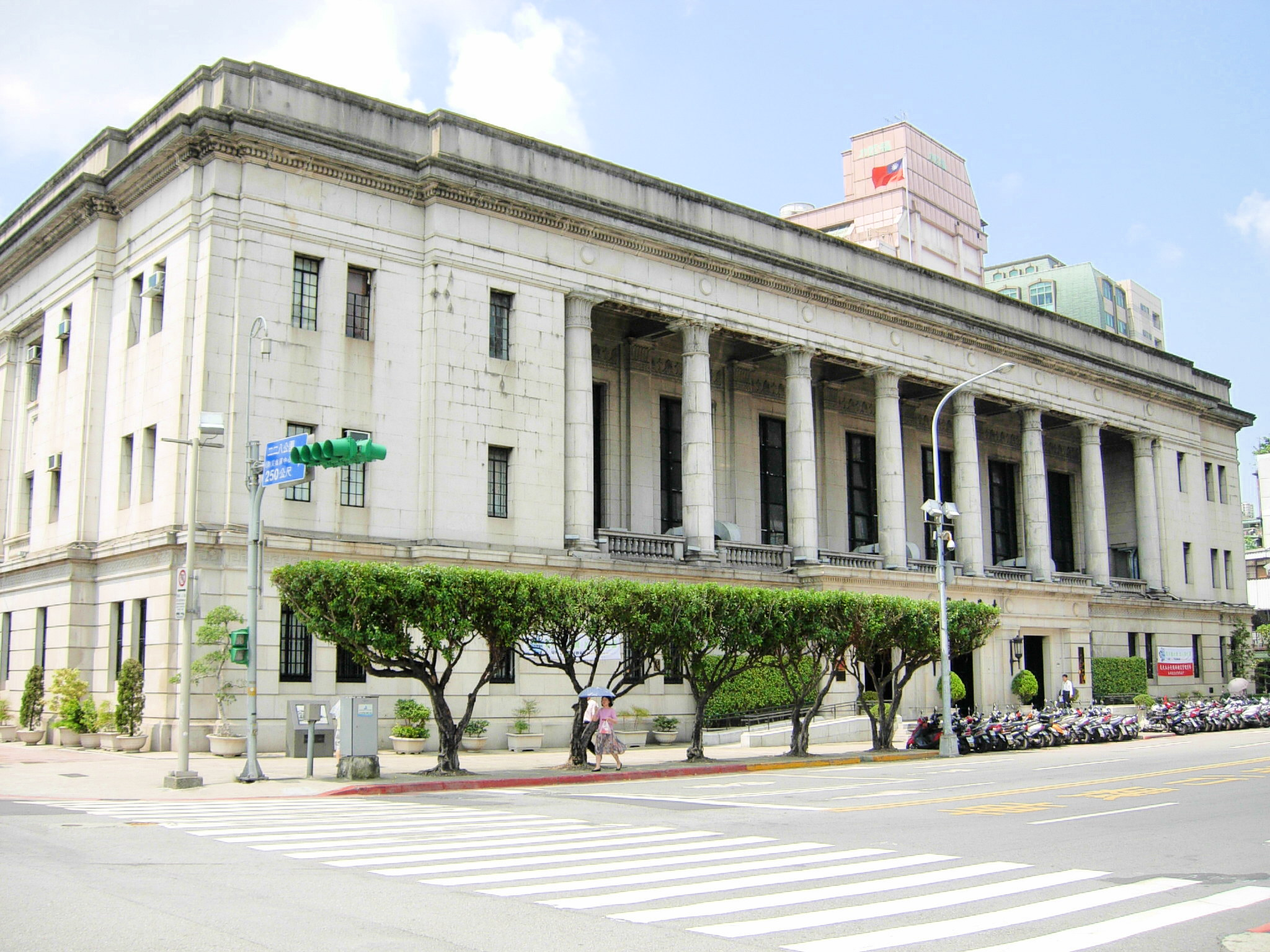
Bank of Taiwan

=== Internal structure ===
The internal structure of the agency comprises:

- Department of General Affairs
- Department of International Fiscal Affairs
- Department for the Promotion of Private Participation
- Department of Secretarial
- Department of Personnel
- Department of Government Ethics
- Department of Accounting
- Department of Statistics
- Department of Legal Affairs

=== Administrative agencies ===
The Ministry of Finance has a number of subordinate agencies reporting to it. They are:

- National Treasury Administration
- Taxation Administration
- National Property Administration
- Customs Administration
- National Taxation Bureau of Taipei
- National Taxation Bureau of Kaohsiung
- National Taxation Bureau of the Northern Area
- National Taxation Bureau of the Central Area
- National Taxation Bureau of the Southern Area
- Fiscal Information Agency
- Training Institute

=== Local agencies under supervision ===
The following agencies report to the Ministry of Finance of the central government:

- Bureau of Finance, Taipei Municipal Government
- Bureau of Finance, Kaohsiung Municipal Government

=== Government corporations ===
These state-owned corporations report to the Ministry of Finance:

- Taiwan Tobacco and Liquor Corporation
- Taiwan Financial Holdings Group, which includes Bank of Taiwan
- Land Bank of Taiwan
- Export–Import Bank of the Republic of China
- Printing Plant, Ministry of Finance

== List of ministers of finance ==
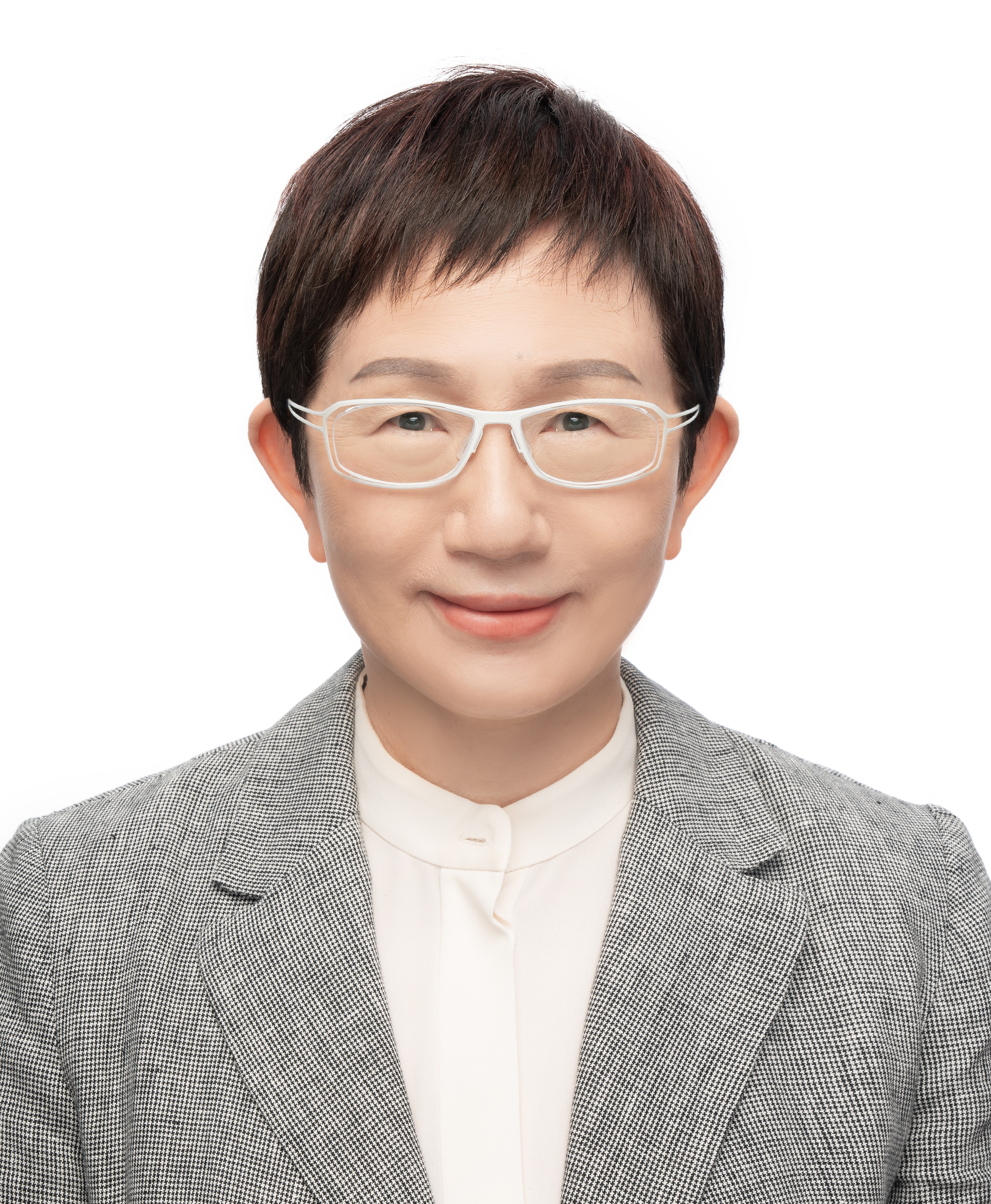
Chuang Tsui-yun, the incumbent Minister of Finance

The following is a list of finance ministers of the Republic of China.

Non-partisan/ unknown Kuomintang (Nationalist) Democratic Progressive Party Non-partisan Solidarity Union

=== Nationalist government during 1927–1947 ===
- Sun Fo (孫科) 1927-1928
- T. V. Soong (宋子文) 1928–1933
- H. H. Kung (孔祥熙) 1933–1944

=== Constitutional government since 1948 ===
№	Name	Term of office		Days	Political party	Cabinet
1	Wang Yun-wu (王雲五)	1 June 1948	15 November 1948	167	Independent	Weng Wenhao
2	Hsu Kan (徐堪)	15 November 1948	30 March 1949	135	Kuomintang	Weng Wenhao; Sun Fo; He Yingqin
3	Liu Kung-yun (劉攻芸)	30 March 1949	25 June 1949	87	Kuomintang	He Yingqin; Yan Xishan
4	Hsu Kan (徐堪)	25 June 1949	4 October 1949	101	Kuomintang	Yan Xishan
5	Kuan Chi-yu (關吉玉)	4 October 1949	16 March 1950	163	Kuomintang	Yan Xishan; Chen Cheng I
6	Yen Chia-kan (嚴家淦)	16 March 1950	1 June 1954	1538	Kuomintang	Chen Cheng I
7	P. Y. Shu (徐柏園)	1 June 1954	26 March 1958	1394	Kuomintang	Yu Hung-Chun
8	Yen Chia-kan (嚴家淦)	26 March 1958	16 December 1963	2091	Kuomintang	Yu Hung-Chun; Chen Cheng II
9	Chen Ching-yu (陳慶瑜)	16 December 1963	4 December 1967	1449	Kuomintang	Yen Chia-kan
10	Yu Kuo-hwa (俞國華)	4 December 1967	4 July 1969	578	Kuomintang	Yen Chia-kan
11	Kwoh-Ting Li (李國鼎)	4 July 1969	11 June 1976	2534	Kuomintang	Yen Chia-kan; Chiang Ching-kuo
12	Fei Hua (費驊)	11 June 1976	1 June 1978	720	Kuomintang	Chiang Ching-kuo
13	Chang Chi-cheng (張繼正)	1 June 1978	1 December 1981	1279	Kuomintang	Sun Yun-suan
14	Hsu Li-teh (徐立德)	1 December 1981	1 June 1984	913	Kuomintang	Sun Yun-suan
15	Lu Reng-kong (陸潤康)	1 June 1984	29 August 1985	454	Kuomintang	Yu Kuo-hua
16	Robert Chien (錢純)	29 August 1985	22 July 1988	1058	Kuomintang	Yu Kuo-hua
17	Shirley Kuo (郭婉容)	22 July 1988	1 June 1990	679	Kuomintang	Yu Kuo-hua; Lee Huan
18	Wang Chien-shien (王建煊)	1 June 1990	23 October 1992	875	Kuomintang	Hau Pei-tsun
19	Bai Pei-ying (白培英)	23 October 1992	27 February 1993	127	Kuomintang	Hau Pei-tsun
20	Lin Chen-kuo (林振國)	27 February 1993	10 June 1996	1199		Lien Chan
21	Paul Chiu (邱正雄)	10 June 1996	20 May 2000	1440	Kuomintang	Lien Chan; Vincent Siew
22	Shea Jia-dong (許嘉棟)	20 May 2000	6 October 2000	139		Tang Fei
23	Yen Ching-chang (顏慶章)	6 October 2000	1 February 2002	483		Chang Chun-hsiung I
24	Lee Yung-san (李庸三)	1 February 2002	2 December 2002	304		Yu Shyi-kun
25	Lin Chuan (林全)	2 December 2002	25 January 2006	1150	Independent	Yu Shyi-kun; Frank Hsieh
26	Joseph Lyu (呂桔誠)	25 January 2006	4 July 2006	160		Su Tseng-chang I
27	Ho Chih-chin (何志欽)	4 July 2006	14 March 2008	619		Su Tseng-chang I Chang Chun-hsiung II
—	Lee Ruey-tsang (李瑞倉)	14 March 2008	20 May 2008	67		Chang Chun-hsiung II
28	Lee Sush-der (李述德)	20 May 2008	6 February 2012	1357	Kuomintang	Liu Chao-shiuan; Wu Den-yih
29	Christina Liu (劉憶如)	6 February 2012	31 May 2012	115	Non-partisan Solidarity Union	Sean Chen
—	Tseng Ming-chung (曾銘宗)	31 May 2012	4 June 2012	4	Kuomintang	Sean Chen
30	Chang Sheng-ford (張盛和)	4 June 2012	20 May 2016	1446	Kuomintang	Sean Chen; Jiang Yi-huah; Mao Chi-kuo; Chang San-cheng
31	Sheu Yu-jer (許虞哲)	20 May 2016	15 July 2018	786	Independent	Lin Chuan; William Lai
32	Su Jain-rong (蘇建榮)	16 July 2018	25 December 2022	1623		William Lai; Su Tseng-chang II
—	Juan Ching-hwa (阮清華)	26 December 2022	30 January 2023	35		Su Tseng-chang II
33	Chuang Tsui-yun (莊翠雲)	31 January 2023	Incumbent	1285		Chen Chien-jen; Cho Jung-tai

== Access ==
The MOF building is accessible from Jingmei Station of the Taipei Metro on the Green Line.

== See also ==
- Economy of Taiwan
- List of banks in Taiwan

== Notes and references ==
- Ministry of Finance, 歷任部長基本資料, retrieved 2005-03-02.
