= Second Su cabinet =

2019–2023 Taiwan's cabinet

- 50st premiership of Republic of China (ROC)

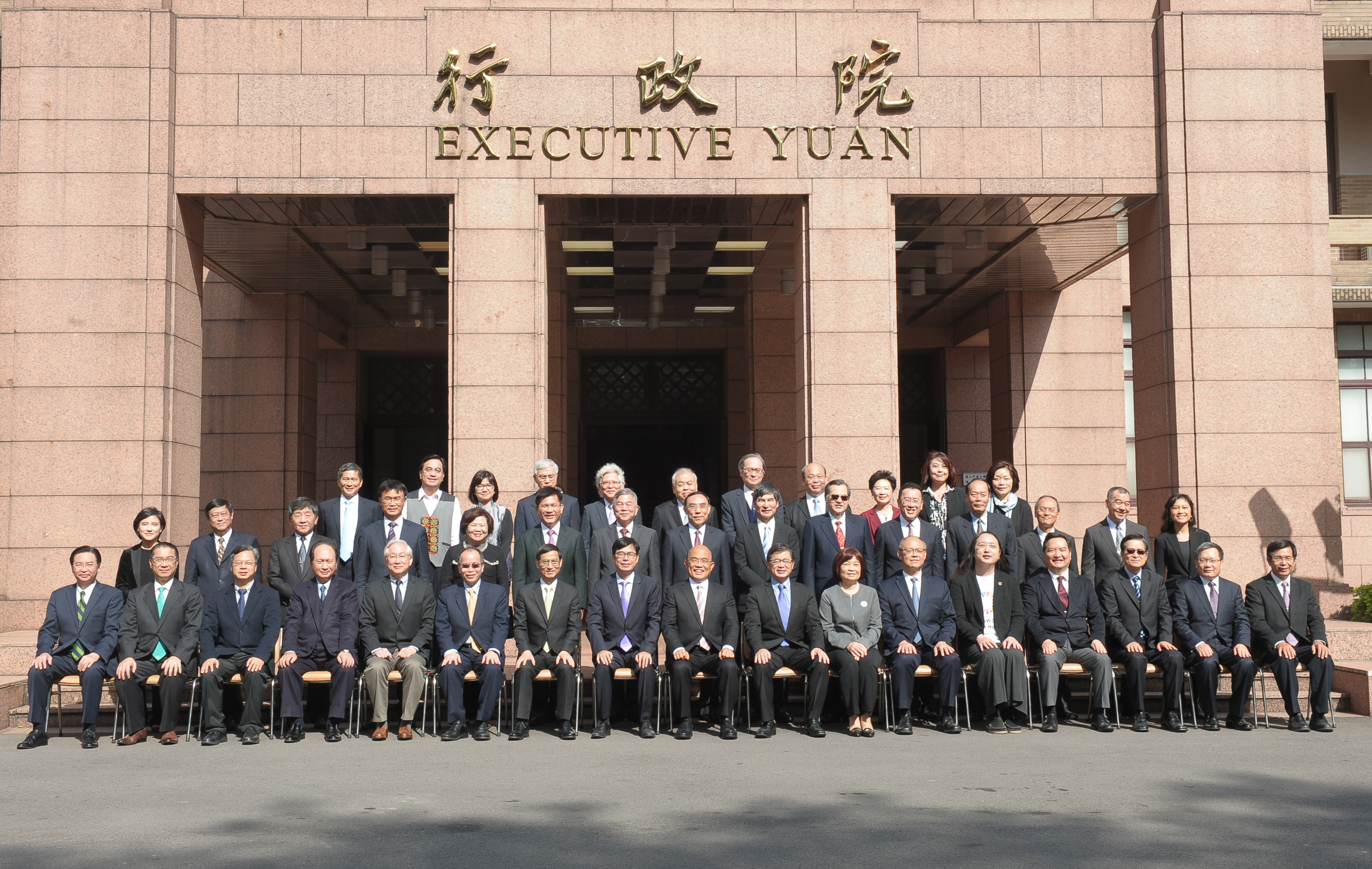
- Date formed: 14 January 2019
- Date dissolved: 31 January 2023

People and organisations
- President: Tsai Ing-wen
- Head of government: Su Tseng-chang
- Deputy head of government: Chen Chi-mai; Shen Jong-chin
- Total no. of members: ?
- Member parties: Democratic Progressive Party (DPP)
- Status in legislature: DPP majority, pan-green majority
- Opposition parties: Kuomintang
- Opposition leader: Johnny Chiang (2020-2021); Eric Chu (since 2021)

History
- Election: 2016 Taiwanese legislative election
- Legislature term: Ninth Legislative Yuan
- Predecessor: Lai cabinet
- Successor: Chen Chien-jen cabinet

Su Tseng-chang was appointed to the premiership on 14 January 2019 by President Tsai Ing-wen. He succeeded William Lai, who had resigned in response to the Democratic Progressive Party's poor performance in the 2018 Taiwanese local elections. This is his second tenure of premiership, as he had served as premier under President Chen Shui-bian from 2006 to 2007 with Tsai Ing-wen, the current president, as his deputy. At the age of 71, he is the third oldest individual (after Lee Huan and Chen Chien-jen) to assume the office.

Su's premiership has led to an increase in approval of the Tsai administration. Recent polls showed an 8.5 percentage point increase in approval of the Tsai administration, with an approval rating of 43 percent. As premier, Su has an approval rating of 53 percent.

== Members ==
=== Leaders ===
Name		Leader
English name	Chinese	Leader
Premier	院長	Su Tseng-chang
Vice Premier	副院長	Chen Chi-mai (2019–2020)
Vice Premier	副院長	Shen Jong-chin (2020–2023)
Secretary-General	秘書長	Li Meng-yen

=== Ministries ===
Name		Minister
English name	Chinese	Minister
Interior	內政部	Hsu Kuo-yung (2019–2022)
Interior	內政部	Hua Ching-chun (2022–2023)
Foreign Affairs	外交部	Joseph Wu
National Defense	國防部	Yen Teh-fa (2019–2021)
National Defense	國防部	Chiu Kuo-cheng (2021–2023)
Finance	財政部	Su Jain-rong (2019–2022)
Finance	財政部	Frank Juan (2022–2023)
Education	教育部	Pan Wen-chung
Justice	法務部	Tsai Ching-hsiang
Economic Affairs	經濟部	Shen Jong-chin (2019–2020)
Economic Affairs	經濟部	Wang Mei-hua (2020–2023)
Transportation and Communications	交通部	Lin Chia-lung (2019–2021)
Transportation and Communications	交通部	Wang Kwo-tsai (2021–2023)
Labor	勞動部	Hsu Ming-chun
Health and Welfare	衛生福利部	Chen Shih-chung (2019–2022)
Health and Welfare	衛生福利部	Hsueh Jui-yuan (2022–2023)
Culture	文化部	Cheng Li-chun (2019–2020)
Culture	文化部	Lee Yung-te (2020–2023)
Science and Technology (abolished in 2022)	科技部	Chen Liang-gee (2019–2020)
Science and Technology (abolished in 2022)	科技部	Wu Tsung-tsong (2020–2022)
Digital Affairs (established in 2022)	數位發展部	Audrey Tang

=== Councils and Commissions ===
Empowered by various laws, or even the Constitution, under the Executive Yuan Council several individual boards are formed to enforce different executive functions of the government. Unless regulated otherwise, the chairs are appointed by and answer to the Premier. The committee members of the boards are usually (a) governmental officials for the purpose of interdepartmental coordination and cooperation; or (b) creditable professionals for their reputation and independence.

To become a ministry
To be merged into other organs

Name		Chair
English name	Chinese	Chair
Council of Agriculture	農業委員會	Chen Chi-chung
National Development Council	國家發展委員會	Chen Mei-ling (2019–2020)
National Development Council	國家發展委員會	Kung Ming-hsin (2020–2023)
Mainland Affairs Council	大陸委員會	Chen Ming-tong (2019–2021)
Mainland Affairs Council	大陸委員會	Chiu Tai-san (2021–2023)
Financial Supervisory Commission	金融監督管理委員會	Wellington Koo (2019–2020)
Financial Supervisory Commission	金融監督管理委員會	Huang Tien-mu (2020–2023)
Ocean Affairs Council	海洋委員會	Lee Chung-wei (2019-2022)
Ocean Affairs Council	海洋委員會	Chou Mei-wu (2022-2023)
Overseas Community Affairs Council	僑務委員會	Wu Hsin-hsing (2019–2020)
Overseas Community Affairs Council	僑務委員會	Tung Chen-yuan (2020–2023)
Veterans Affairs Council	國軍退除役官兵輔導委員會	Chiu Kuo-cheng (2019)
Veterans Affairs Council	國軍退除役官兵輔導委員會	Feng Shih-kuan (2019–2023)
Council of Indigenous Peoples	原住民族委員會	Icyang Parod
Hakka Affairs Council	客家委員會	Lee Yung-te (2019–2020)
Hakka Affairs Council	客家委員會	Yiong Con-ziin (2020–2023)
Public Construction Commission	公共工程委員會	Wu Tze-cheng
Atomic Energy Council	原子能委員會	Hsieh Shou-shing
Science and Technology Council (established in 2022)	國家科學及技術委員會	Wu Tsung-tsong

==== Independent Commissions ====
There are, or would be, independent executive commissions under the Executive Yuan Council. The chiefs of these five institutions would not be affected by any change of the Premier. However, the related organic laws are currently under revision.

Name		Chair
English name	Chinese	Chair
Central Election Commission	中央選舉委員會	Lee Chin-yung
Fair Trade Commission	公平交易委員會	Huang Mei-ying
National Communications Commission	國家通訊傳播委員會	Chen Yaw-shyang

=== Other organs ===
To become a ministry
To be merged into other organs

Name		Leader
English name	Chinese	Leader
Environmental Protection Administration	環境保護署	Chang Tzi-chin
Central Bank	中央銀行	Yang Chin-long
National Palace Museum	國立故宮博物院	Wu Mi-cha
Directorate-General of Budget, Accounting and Statistics	主計總處	Chu Tzer-ming
Directorate-General of Personnel Administration	人事行政總處	Jay N. Shih
