= Lai cabinet =

49th cabinet of Taiwan

- 49th premiership of the ROC Taiwan

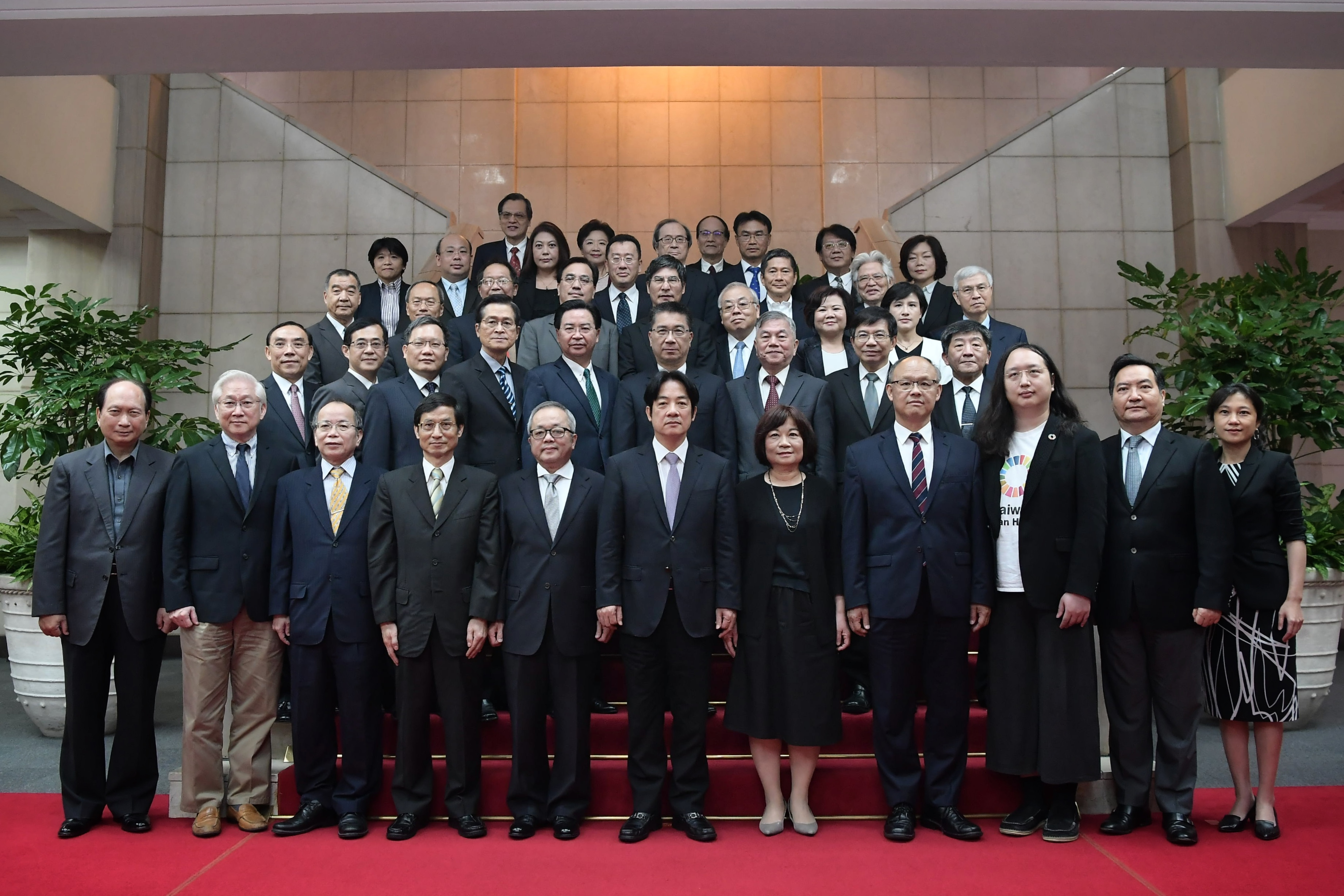
- Lai cabinet in 2019
- Date formed: 8 September 2017
- Date dissolved: 11 January 2019

People and organisations
- Head of state: Tsai Ing-wen
- Head of government: William Lai Ching-te
- Deputy head of government: Shih Jun-ji
- Total no. of members: ?
- Member parties: Democratic Progressive Party (DPP)
- Status in legislature: DPP majority, pan-green majority
- Opposition parties: Kuomintang
- Opposition leader: Johnny Chiang

History
- Election: 2016 Taiwanese legislative election
- Legislature term: Ninth Legislative Yuan
- Predecessor: Lin cabinet
- Successor: Second Su cabinet

== History ==
On 3 September 2017, Premier Lin Chuan tendered his resignation to President Tsai Ing-wen, which was reluctantly accepted. A recent poll showed Lin's approve rating to be a mere 28.7%, with 6 in 10 respondents dissatisfied with the performance of his cabinet. On 5 September President Tsai announced at a press conference that Lai would become the country's next head of the Executive Yuan, with the Premier-designate saying that running the government is like running in a relay race, and he vowed to take the baton from Lin and complete his unfinished major policies.

Lai took office on 8 September as the 49th Premier of the Republic of China. On 17 September following Lai's appointment as premier, Tsai's approval ratings reached 46%, rebounding by more than 16 points since August. Lai made his first appearance as premier at the Legislative Yuan on 26 September, where he stated "I am a political worker who advocates Taiwan independence" but that "We are already an independent sovereign nation called the Republic of China. We don't need a separate declaration of independence". Lai has appeared to have moderated his position on Taiwanese independence particularly when he proposed the idea of "being close to China while loving Taiwan" in June 2017. He also expressed no desire to run against Tsai Ing-wen in the 2020 presidential election. On 28 September, the New Party called on the KMT to join it in filing a formal complaint against the Premier for sedition.

Lai's cabinet resigned on 11 January 2019. His cabinet was succeeded by the second cabinet of Su Tseng-chang.

== Members ==
=== Leaders ===
Name		Leader
English name	Chinese	Leader
Premier	院長	Lai Ching-te
Vice Premier	副院長	Shih Jun-ji
Secretary-General	秘書長	Cho Jung-tai

=== Ministries ===
Name		Minister
English name	Chinese	Minister
Interior	內政部	Hsu Kuo-yung
Foreign Affairs	外交部	Joseph Wu
National Defense	國防部	Yen Teh-fa
Finance	財政部	Su Jain-rong
Education	教育部	Yao Leeh-ter (acting)
Justice	法務部	Tsai Ching-hsiang
Economic Affairs	經濟部	Shen Jong-chin
Transportation and Communications	交通部	Wang Kwo-tsai (acting)
Labor	勞動部	Hsu Ming-chun
Health and Welfare	衛生福利部	Chen Shih-chung
Culture	文化部	Cheng Li-chun
Science and Technology	科技部	Chen Liang-gee

=== Councils and Commissions ===
Empowered by various laws, or even the Constitution, under the Executive Yuan Council several individual boards are formed to enforce different executive functions of the government. Unless regulated otherwise, the chairs are appointed by and answer to the Premier. The committee members of the boards are usually (a) governmental officials for the purpose of interdepartmental coordination and cooperation; or (b) creditable professionals for their reputation and independence.

To become a ministry
To be merged into other organs

Name		Chair
English name	Chinese	Chair
Council of Agriculture	農業委員會	Chen Chi-chung (acting)
National Development Council	國家發展委員會	Chen Mei-ling
Mainland Affairs Council	大陸委員會	Chen Ming-tong
Financial Supervisory Commission	金融監督管理委員會	Wellington Koo
Ocean Affairs Council	海洋委員會	Hwung Hwung-hweng
Overseas Community Affairs Council	僑務委員會	Wu Hsin-hsing
Veterans Affairs Council	國軍退除役官兵輔導委員會	Chiu Kuo-cheng
Council of Indigenous Peoples	原住民族委員會	Icyang Parod
Hakka Affairs Council	客家委員會	Lee Yung-te
Public Construction Commission	公共工程委員會	Wu Tze-cheng
Atomic Energy Council	原子能委員會	Hsieh Shou-shing

==== Independent Commissions ====
There are, or would be, independent executive commissions under the Executive Yuan Council. The chiefs of these five institutions would not be affected by any change of the Premier. However, the related organic laws are currently under revision.

Name		Chair
English name	Chinese	Chair
Central Election Commission	中央選舉委員會	Chen Chao-chien (acting)
Fair Trade Commission	公平交易委員會	Huang Mei-ying
National Communications Commission	國家通訊傳播委員會	Chan Ting-I

=== Other organs ===
To become a ministry
To be merged into other organs

Name		Leader
English name	Chinese	Leader
Environmental Protection Administration	環境保護署	Tsai Hung-teh (acting)
Central Bank	中央銀行	Yang Chin-long
National Palace Museum	國立故宮博物院	Chen Chi-nan
Directorate-General of Budget, Accounting and Statistics	主計總處	Chu Tzer-ming
Directorate-General of Personnel Administration	人事行政總處	Jay N. Shih
