= Cho cabinet =

52nd cabinet of Taiwan

Cho Jung-tai cabinet
- 52nd premiership of Taiwan

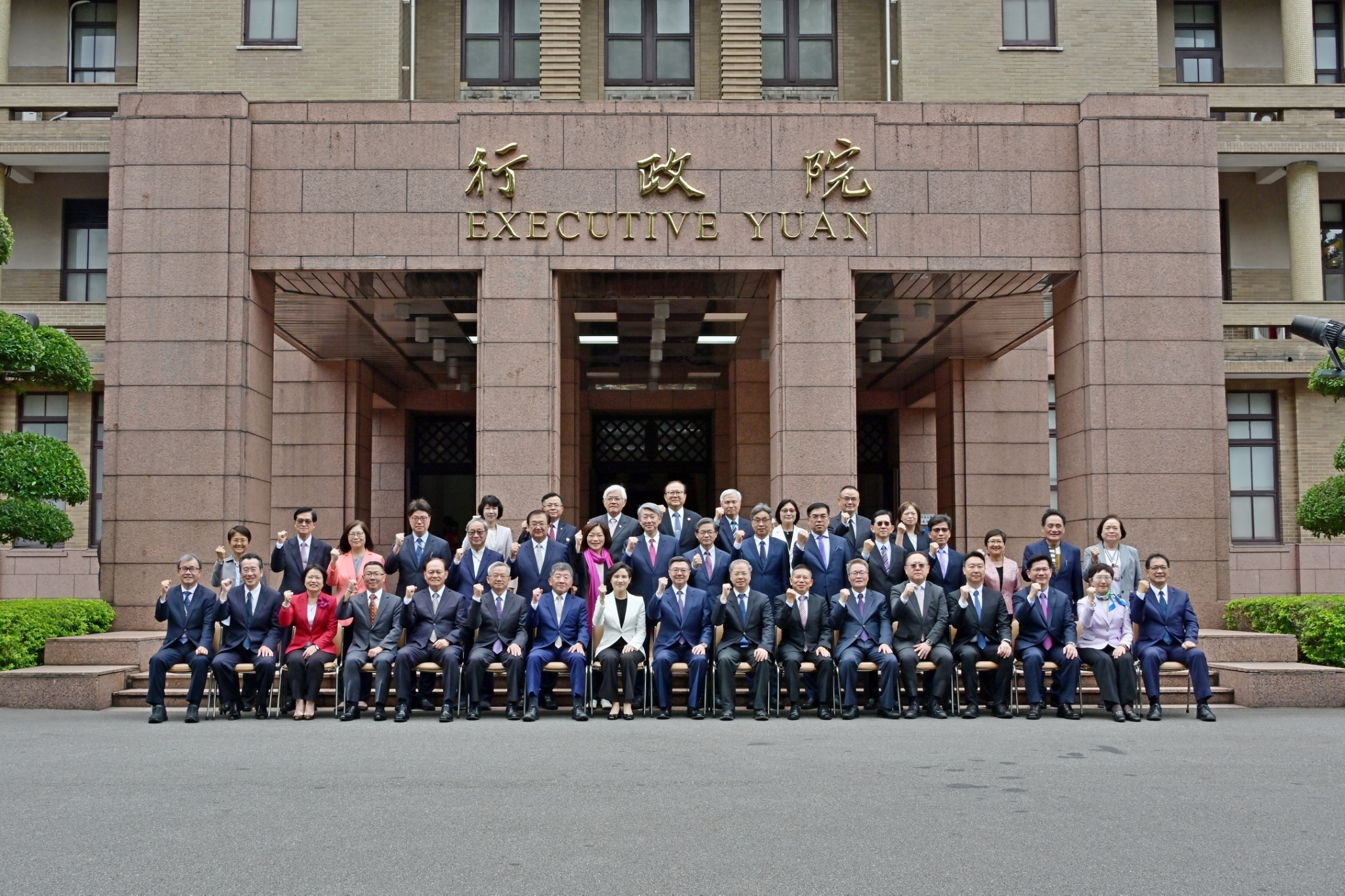
- Date formed: 20 May 2024

People and organisations
- President: Lai Ching-te
- Head of government: Cho Jung-tai
- Deputy head of government: Cheng Li-chun
- Member parties: Democratic Progressive Party (DPP)
- Status in legislature: DPP minority, opposition majority
- Opposition parties: Kuomintang; Taiwan People's Party
- Opposition leader: KMT: Eric Chu Cheng Li-wun; TPP: Ko Wen-je; Huang Kuo-chang

History
- Election: 2024 Taiwanese legislative election
- Legislature term: 11th Legislative Yuan
- Predecessor: Chen Chien-jen cabinet

The following is the cabinet of Cho Jung-tai, who was appointed as Premier of Taiwan on 20 May 2024 by President Lai Ching-te. This is the first premiership of Lai's presidency. The cabinet is also known as the Active & Innovative "AI" Cabinet (Chinese: 行動創新AI內閣; pinyin: Xíngdòng chuàngxīn AI nèigé).

== Members ==
=== Leaders ===
Name		Leader
English name	Chinese	Leader
Premier	院長	Cho Jung-tai
Vice Premier	副院長	Cheng Li-chiun
Secretary-General	秘書長	Xavier Chang

=== Ministries ===
Name		Minister
English name	Chinese	Minister
Interior	內政部	Liu Shyh-fang
Foreign Affairs	外交部	Lin Chia-lung
National Defense	國防部	Wellington L.H. Koo
Finance	財政部	Chuang Tsui-yun
Education	教育部	Cheng Ying-yao
Justice	法務部	Cheng Ming-chien
Economic Affairs	經濟部	Kung Ming-hsin
Transportation and Communications	交通部	Chen Shih-kai
Labor	勞動部	Hung Sun-han
Health and Welfare	衛生福利部	Shih Chung-liang
Culture	文化部	Li Yuan
Digital Affairs	數位發展部	Lin Yi-jing
Agriculture	農業部	Chen Junne-jih
Environment	環境部	Peng Chi-ming
Sports	運動部	Lee Yang

=== Agencies ===
Name		Minister
English name	Chinese	Minister
National Development Council	國家發展委員會	Liu Jin-ching
National Science and Technology Council	國家科學及技術委員會	Wu Cheng-wen
Mainland Affairs Council	大陸委員會	Chiu Chui-cheng
Financial Supervisory Commission	金融監督管理委員會	Peng Jin-lung
Ocean Affairs Council	海洋委員會	Kuan Bi-ling
Overseas Community Affairs Council	僑務委員會	Elaine Lee
Veterans Affairs Council	國軍退除役官兵輔導委員會	Yen Teh-fa
Council of Indigenous Peoples	原住民族委員會	Tseng Chih-yung
Hakka Affairs Council	客家委員會	Ku Hsiu-Fei
Public Construction Commission	公共工程委員會	Chen Chin-te
National Palace Museum	國立故宮博物院	Hsiao Tsung-huang
Directorate-General of Budget, Accounting and Statistics	主計總處	Chen Shu-Tzu
Directorate-General of Personnel Administration	人事行政總處	Su Chun-jung

==== Independent Organs ====
The heads of these independent institutions under the Executive Yuan Council would not be affected by any change of the Premier.

Name		Chair
English name	Chinese	Chair
Central Election Commission	中央選舉委員會	Michael You
Fair Trade Commission	公平交易委員會	Andy Chen
National Communications Commission	國家通訊傳播委員會	Chen Chung-shu
Central Bank	中央銀行	Yang Chin-long

=== Other roles ===
Name		Leader
English name	Chinese	Leader
Minister without Portfolio	政務委員	Chen Shih-chung
Minister without Portfolio	政務委員	Chen Chin-te
Minister without Portfolio	政務委員	Lin Min-hsin
Minister without Portfolio	政務委員	Chi Lien-cheng
Minister without Portfolio	政務委員	Liu Jin-ching
Minister without Portfolio	政務委員	Wu Cheng-wen
Minister without Portfolio	政務委員	Ma Yung-chen
Spokesperson	發言人	Michelle Lee
