= Chen Chien-jen cabinet =

Advisory body to the President of the Republic of China

- 51st premiership of Taiwan

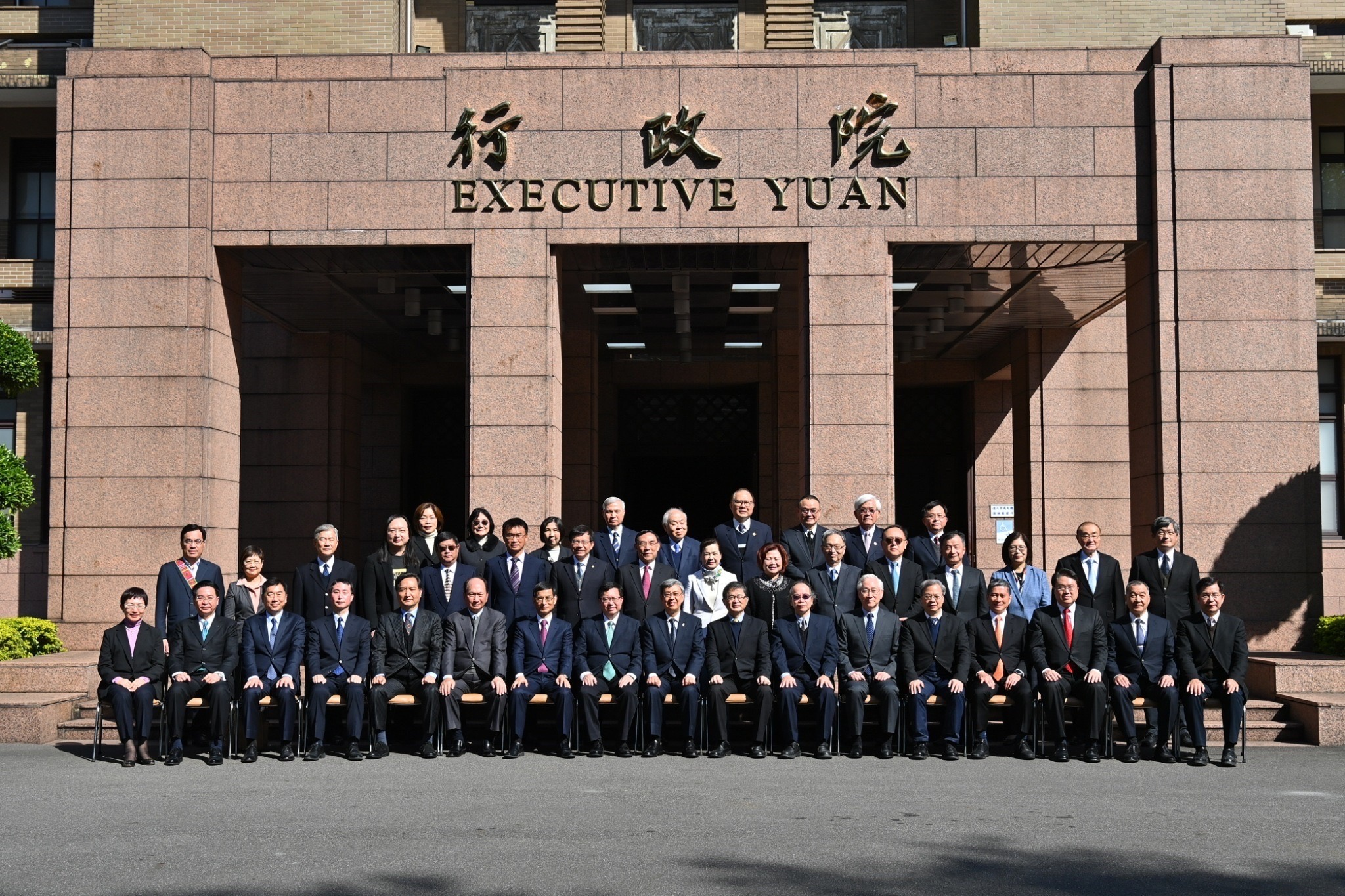
- Date formed: 31 January 2023
- Date dissolved: 20 May 2024

People and organisations
- President: Tsai Ing-wen
- Head of government: Chen Chien-jen
- Deputy head of government: Cheng Wen-tsan
- Member parties: Democratic Progressive Party (DPP)
- Status in legislature: DPP majority, pan-green majority (until 31 January 2024); DPP minority, opposition majority (since 1 February 2024)
- Opposition parties: Kuomintang
- Opposition leader: Eric Chu

History
- Elections: 2020 Taiwanese legislative election 2024 Taiwanese legislative election
- Legislature terms: 10th Legislative Yuan; 11th Legislative Yuan
- Predecessor: Second Su cabinet
- Successor: Cho cabinet

The following is the cabinet of Chen Chien-jen, who was appointed as Premier of Taiwan on 31 January 2023 by President Tsai Ing-wen. He succeeded Su Tseng-chang, who had resigned in response to the Democratic Progressive Party's poor performance in the 2022 Taiwanese local elections. The vice president from 2016 to 2020, he is the second oldest individual to take office (after Lee Huan) at 71 years and 239 days. This is the 4th premiership of Tsai Ing-wen's presidency.

== Members ==
=== Leaders ===
Name		Leader
English name	Chinese	Leader
Premier	院長	Chen Chien-jen
Vice Premier	副院長	Cheng Wen-tsan
Secretary-General	秘書長	Li Meng-yen

=== Ministries ===
Name		Minister
English name	Chinese	Minister
Interior	內政部	Lin Yu-chang
Foreign Affairs	外交部	Joseph Wu
National Defense	國防部	Chiu Kuo-cheng
Finance	財政部	Chuang Tsui-yun
Education	教育部	Pan Wen-chung
Justice	法務部	Tsai Ching-hsiang
Economic Affairs	經濟部	Wang Mei-hua
Transportation and Communications	交通部	Wang Kwo-tsai
Labor	勞動部	Hsu Ming-chun
Health and Welfare	衛生福利部	Hsueh Jui-yuan
Culture	文化部	Shih Che
Digital Affairs	數位發展部	Audrey Tang
Agriculture (since 1 August 2023)	農業部	Chen Junne-jih (Acting)
Environment (since 22 August 2023)	環境部	Shieu Fuh-Sheng

=== Other roles ===
Name		Leader
English name	Chinese	Leader
Minister without Portfolio	政務委員	Lin Wan-i
Minister without Portfolio	政務委員	Wu Tsung-tsong
Minister without Portfolio	政務委員	Chang Ching-sen
Minister without Portfolio	政務委員	John Deng
Minister without Portfolio	政務委員	Lo Ping-cheng
Minister without Portfolio	政務委員	Wu Tze-cheng
Minister without Portfolio	政務委員	Kung Ming-hsin
Minister without Portfolio	政務委員	Chang Tzi-chin
Spokesperson	發言人	Lin Tze-luen

=== Councils and Commissions ===
Empowered by various laws, or even the Constitution, under the Executive Yuan Council several individual boards are formed to enforce different executive functions of the government. Unless regulated otherwise, the chairs are appointed by and answer to the Premier. The committee members of the boards are usually (a) governmental officials for the purpose of interdepartmental coordination and cooperation; or (b) creditable professionals for their reputation and independence.

To become a ministry
To be merged into other organs

Name		Chair
English name	Chinese	Chair
National Development Council	國家發展委員會	Kung Ming-hsin
Mainland Affairs Council	大陸委員會	Chiu Tai-san
Financial Supervisory Commission	金融監督管理委員會	Huang Tien-mu
Ocean Affairs Council	海洋委員會	Kuan Bi-ling
Overseas Community Affairs Council	僑務委員會	Hsu Chia-ching
Veterans Affairs Council	國軍退除役官兵輔導委員會	Feng Shih-kuan
Council of Indigenous Peoples	原住民族委員會	Icyang Parod
Hakka Affairs Council	客家委員會	Yiong Con-ziin
Public Construction Commission	公共工程委員會	Wu Tze-cheng
Atomic Energy Council	原子能委員會	Chang Ching-wen
Science and Technology Council	國家科學及技術委員會	Wu Tsung-tsong

==== Independent Commissions ====
There are, or would be, independent executive commissions under the Executive Yuan Council. The chiefs of these five institutions would not be affected by any change of the Premier. However, the related organic laws are currently under revision.

Name		Chair
English name	Chinese	Chair
Central Election Commission	中央選舉委員會	Lee Chin-yung
Fair Trade Commission	公平交易委員會	Lee Mei
National Communications Commission	國家通訊傳播委員會	Chen Yaw-shyang

=== Other organs ===
To become a ministry
To be merged into other organs

Name		Leader
English name	Chinese	Leader
Central Bank	中央銀行	Yang Chin-long
National Palace Museum	國立故宮博物院	Hsiao Tsung-huang
Directorate-General of Budget, Accounting and Statistics	主計總處	Chu Tzer-ming
Directorate-General of Personnel Administration	人事行政總處	Su Chun-jung
