= Michael Gau =

Taiwanese legal scholar

- 高聖惕

Vice Chairperson of Aviation Safety Council of the Republic of China
- In office 21 May 2012 – 2016
- Chairperson: Chang Yu-hern; Hwung Hwung-hweng
- Succeeded by: Chi Chia-fen

Personal details
- Born: 1963 (age 62–63) Taipei, Taiwan
- Education: National Taiwan University (LLB); University of Cambridge (LLM); King's College London (LLM); Leiden University (PhD)

Michael Gau (Chinese: 高聖惕; pinyin: Gāo Shèngtì) is a Taiwanese legal scholar and lawyer. He served as vice chairperson of the Aviation Safety Council from 21 May 2012 and was replaced by Chi Chia-fen in 2016.

== Early life and education ==
Gau was born in 1963 in Taipei. He graduated from National Taiwan University with a Bachelor of Laws (LL.B.) in 1987, then completed graduate studies in England, where he earned a Master of Laws (LL.M.) specializing in international law from the University of Cambridge in 1990 and a second LL.M. from King's College London in 1991. In 1997, Gau completed his Ph.D. in law from Leiden University in the Netherlands. His doctoral dissertation was titled, "Governmental Representation for Territories in the ICAO: A Case Study".

== Career ==
He has taught at National University of Kaohsiung in 2000–2005, Soochow University in 2005–2010, National Taiwan Ocean University in 2010–2017, Hainan University in 2017-2019 and Wuhan University since 2019.
