= COVID-19 contact tracing in Taiwan =

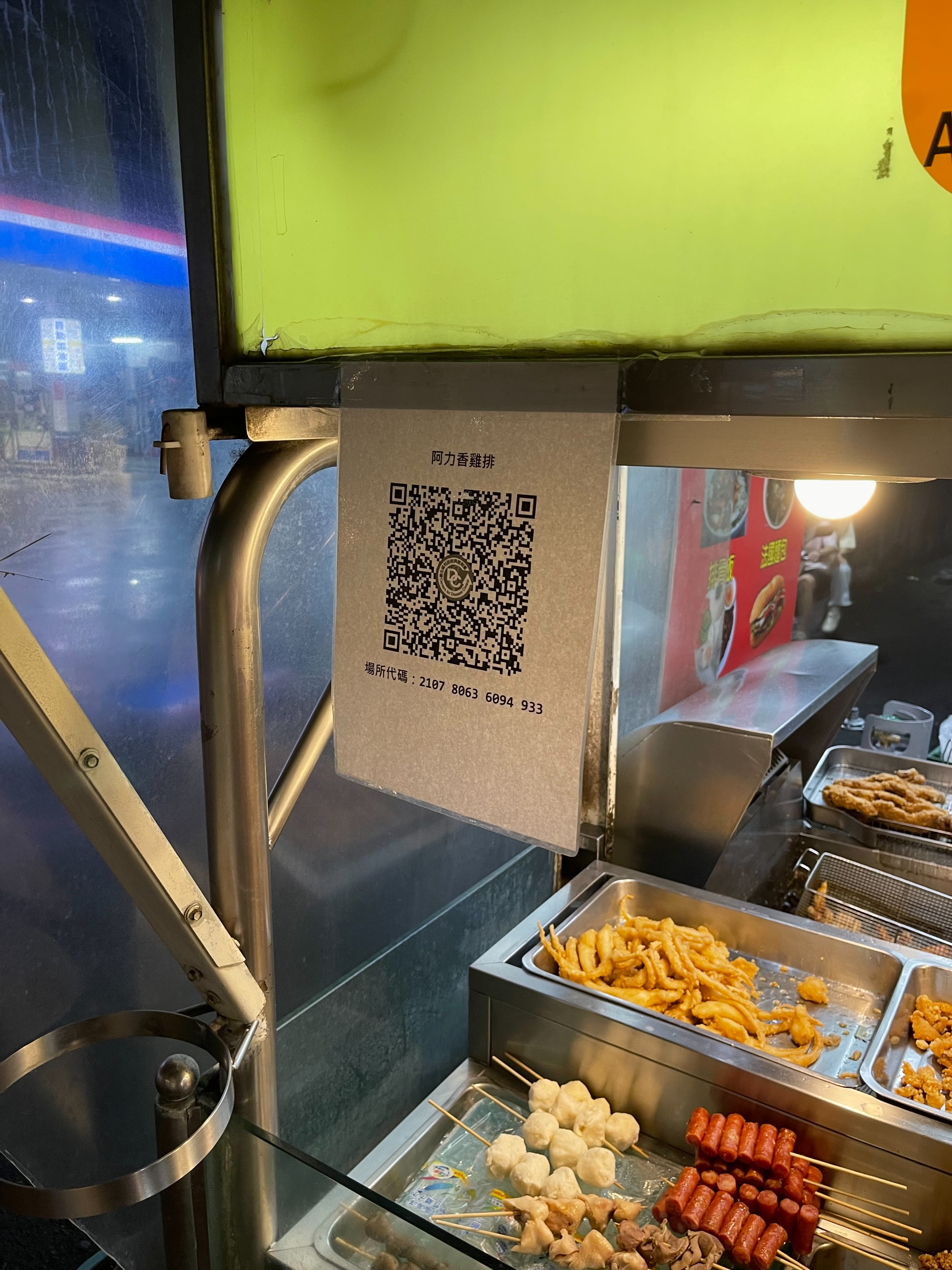
An example of the QR code

Contact information registration is a nationwide policy in Taiwan imposed by the Centers for Disease Control (CDC) starting from May 2021 to April 2022. Contact Information registration is imposed as a part of the Taiwanese government's effort to combat the COVID-19 pandemic.

Contact information registration required citizens to scan a QR-code before entering a public space which would redirect the user to the user’s chosen SMS application and with a prewritten text message to the number “1922”. The purpose of the text message is to facilitate contact tracing since the message is kept by the service provider for 28 days. According to the CDC, the total amount of text messages sent for the duration of the policy exceeded 4.77 billion.

== Summary ==
All countries in the world were affected by the COVID-19 pandemic and thus had to implement policies to deal with the spread of the virus and to control the COVID-19 outbreak. In Taiwan, digital tools have been introduced to support existing policies in tracking and monitoring COVID-19 cases.

Before the beginning of the pandemic, Taiwan Centers for Disease Control (TCDC) had already developed in 2017 a national contact tracing platform called TRACE, based on lessons learned from the Ebola epidemic in West Africa. TRACE was implemented to investigate and monitor the health status of contacts affected by diseases including measles and rubella and exposed to animals infected with avian influenza.

In mid-January 2021 was then developed the COVID-19 module to support contact tracing and slow the spread of transmission. The system included case tracking, the creation of a contact list, health monitoring and quarantine measures of close contacts. From April 5, 2020, a self-reporting via automatic text-message or web-app was implemented.

Due to the significant rise in COVID-19 cases across Taiwan and the country being placed under a Level 3 COVID alert, a new QR code-based system was introduced from April 2021 to help track movements during COVID-19 outbreak.

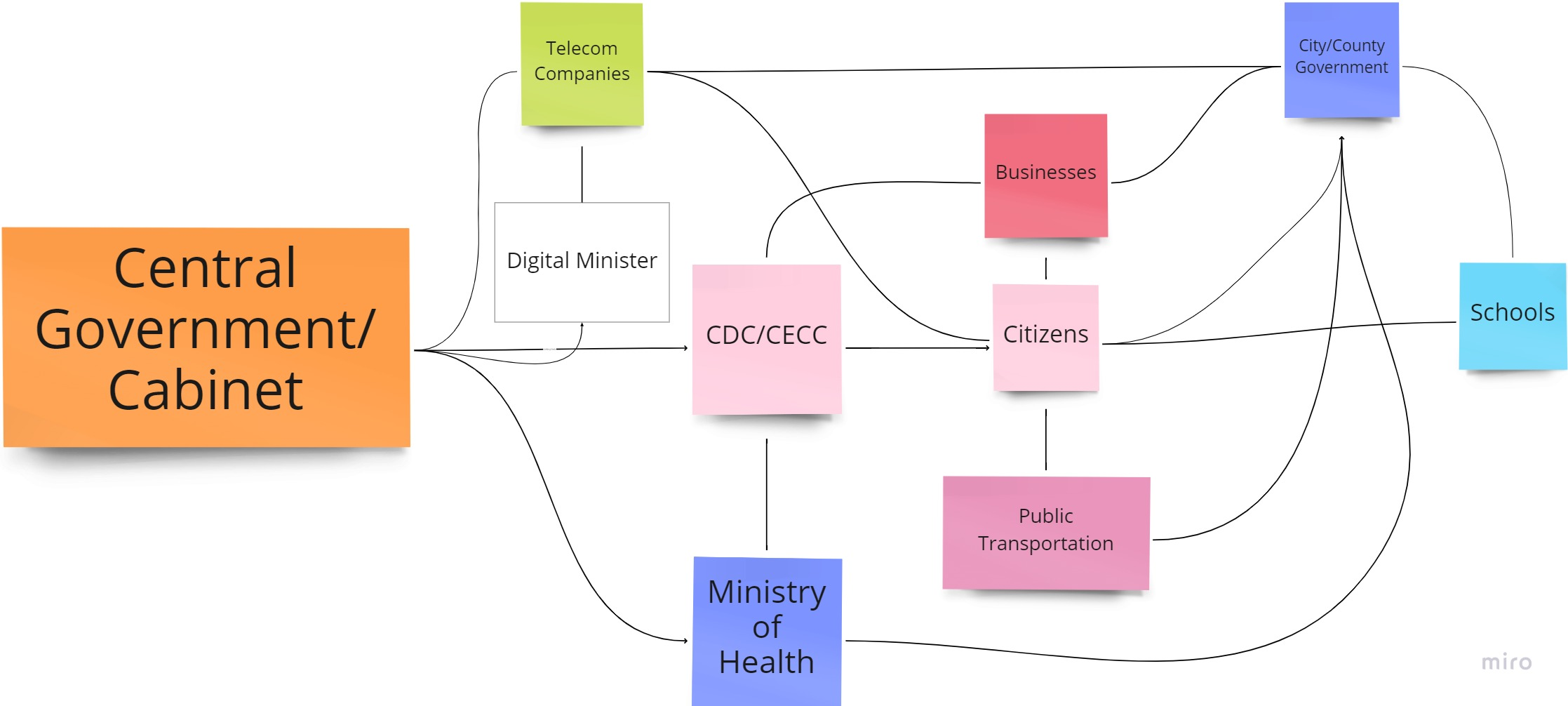
Diagram of the network

== Contact Information Registration Network ==
With fears of a worsening COVID-19 situation in Taiwan, the Executive Yuan presented a new Contact Information Registration method, which enabled the government to track down movements and nearby contacts of patients diagnosed with COVID-19. In order for this application to work, various levels of government cooperated closely on differing levels of contact tracing. The government has opted for a collaborative approach in which central government health authorities work in tandem with local city and county health authorities to provide contact tracing for recorded COVID-19 cases.

Through a myriad of networks, the central government has placed agencies and organizations as nodes, with the goal of creating a web of connections spanning from private entities and the public. The network encompassed a wide variety of levels within society, ranging from the common citizen to the central government. Through an integration of public-private partnership, the central government was able to acquire the cooperation of major telecom companies in Taiwan. These companies collaborated and provided a platform for the text messages to be sent to decentralized data collection centers for contact tracing. The cooperation between the central government and the telecom companies is a situation in which the government contracted health-related communication services to the telecom firms as it enabled them to become the medium of exchange between the health authorities and the populace.

The networks are designed to promote interoperability between agencies and organizations to facilitate the input of data for regular citizens, and the output of travel history for government tracing. The network visualization within the graph identifies the various parties involved within the process of Contact Information Registration. The primary network exists as a linear function between the central government, the CDC/CECC, and the citizens. Each entity has a theoretical role to play, which determines the level of efficacy of the Contact Information Registration.

Roles are defined as follows:

1. The Central Government: Issues a permit for a policy that benefits the overall wellbeing of Taiwanese society, and to provide resources, funding, and support for the venture.

2. The Health Ministry: Oversees the creation of a policy which allows for a reduction in COVID-19 cases in Taiwan.

3. The Digital Minister: Creates a text messaging service that enables for a rapid containment of COVID-19 cases via cell phone geolocation contact tracing. The Digital ministry shall also create unique QR codes for differing venues.

4. The Telecom companies: Shall provide the communication platform for the contact tracing SMS to occur.

5. The CDC: Acts as an intermediary between the local healthcare bureaus of the county and city governments, and to provide information on infected individuals for quarantine.

6. The City/County Government: Is expected to follow the directives and information of the CDC and to provide immediate care measures for citizens infected with COVID-19, such as quarantine, disinfection, and further contact tracing of close contacts.

7. Schools, Businesses, and Public Transportation: Are required to place QR code links on publicly viewable areas for citizens to scan and perform contact information registration.

8. Citizens: Are expected to comply with the government policy of Contact Information Registration, and are required to scan a QR Code at applicable venues, followed by a SMS to the CDC provided phone number.

The various connections and affiliations are essential to the goal of network governance by the central government, thereby allowing for broader coverage of contact tracing, whilst maintaining efficacy of the policy.

== Public engagement ==
Contact information registration required citizens to scan QR-codes before entering public space, creating concerns among the public. A major concern was about an individual's data privacy in scanning the QR-codes.

Citizens worried about their personal information being leaked as well as the system being used for other social control purposes. These concerns were assuaged by Audrey Tang, the Minister for Digital Affairs. Tang explained that the use of cell phone tracking was favored over the Global Positioning System because cell phone tracking only provided an approximate user location instead of the exact user location. In addition, contact tracing data is also purposely decentralized, deleted after 28 days and kept out of the hands of prosecutors. Tang stated the phone companies, venue and QR-code maker only have fragmented data about each individual.

"So, these different parties are storing only part of the piece of the puzzle, and without piecing them together, a cybersecurity breach or something does not actually reveal anything useful.”

In order to strike a balance between information accuracy and privacy within the system, the SMS generated contains merely the random location code, number and check-in time. In addition, without the information stored, to be deleted 28 days later.

== Problems ==
The policy of the Contact Information Registration emerged under the COVID-19 pandemic. However, the emergence of this policy also faces many accompanying problems. The Contact Information Registration in Taiwan mainly faces three major problems:

1. Lack of will

After scanning the Contact Information Registration and sending out a text message, the owner of the mobile phone will be recorded, and the people think that this policy has many loopholes and inconveniences, so there is a mentality of "As not scan as possible". In addition, the Contact Information Registration can carry the number of peers behind the text, but when it is really necessary to track the footprint through the Contact Information Registration, the number of peers in the notes will become difficult to trace, which also makes this policy considered unfeasible.

2. Budget ran out

In the inquiry of the National Court of the Republic of China on October 12, 2021, legislator Ann Kao asked: “one text message of the real-link system is 0.1 NT dollar. As of today, 2.3 billion text messages have been sent, and the budget of 300 million NT dollar has been insufficient, what will government do?” Chen Tsung-yen, deputy commander of the command center, said: “Based on the needs of the epidemic investigation, the cost will continue to be paid.” As of October last year, the budget had been exceeded, and the public believed that the Contact Information Registration was not very useful, so the policy was finally announced to be cancelled on April 27, 2022.

3. Incomplete Regulations

At the press conference of the Executive Yuan of the Republic of China on May 19, 2021, the reporter once asked the Executive Yuan: “the information provided by the public is very useful to the private industry. Can it be guaranteed that after 28 days, the industry will take the public's personal information? Is the information really deleted?” In this regard, Lo Ping-cheng, a member of the Executive Yuan's political affairs committee and spokesman, said: “The relevant norms, such as the 28-day preservation, have existing principles and regulations. I think that the operator will not keep it for more than 28 days without authorization, because it does not want the data to occupy its space. In fact, the five major telecom operators in Taiwan also follow the relevant regulations, and we believe they will not mess around.” There is no clear regulation restricting telecommunications operators and there is no corresponding supervision method to supervise whether the telecommunications operators completely delete relevant information, so the Contact Information Registration policy is not believed by the people.
