= Chen Ruei-min =

Taiwanese politician

Chen Ruei-min (Chinese: 陳瑞敏) is a Taiwanese politician.

Chen served as deputy minister of the Directorate General of Budget, Accounting and Statistics under Chu Tzer-ming. In September 2019, Chen was nominated to lead the National Audit Office as auditor-general.
