= Luh Dun-jin =

Politician from Taiwan

- 鹿篤瑾

Deputy Minister of Directorate General of Budget, Accounting and Statistics of the Republic of China
- Minister: Shih Su-mei

Personal details
- Education: Soochow University (BA)

Luh Dun-jin (Chinese: 鹿篤瑾; pinyin: Lù Dǔjǐn) is a Taiwanese politician. He currently serves as the Deputy Minister of the Directorate-General of Budget, Accounting and Statistics (DGBAS) of the Executive Yuan.

== Education ==
Luh obtained his bachelor's degree in economics from Soochow University.

== Directorate-General of Budget, Accounting and Statistics ==
Luh has held several positions in DGBAS such as section chief in 1987–1994, senior executive officer in 1994–1995, deputy director in 1995–1996, chief secretary in 1996–1997, office director of investigation in 1997–1998, controller in 1998-1999 and controller and director of the fourth department in 1999-2005 and of the third department in 2005–2006.
