= Transportation Safety Board =

Transportation Safety Board may refer to:

- Transportation Safety Board of Canada, a government agency of Canada
- Taiwan Transportation Safety Board, a government agency of Taiwan
- National Transportation Safety Board, a government agency of the United States
