= Chi Chia-fen =

Taiwanese industrial engineer

Chia-fen Christine Chi (Chinese: 紀佳芬; pinyin: Jì Jiāfēn; Wade–Giles: Chi^{4} Chia^{1}-fen^{1}) is a Taiwanese industrial engineer.

Chi Chia-fen earned her bachelor's of science degree from the Tunghai University Department of Industrial Engineering. She completed master's and doctoral studies at the State University of New York at Buffalo. Chi became a professor at the National Taiwan University of Science and Technology in 1998, and was named a distinguished professor in 2012. Prior to her appointment to a distinguished professorship, Chi served as chair of the industrial management department from 2008 to 2010, associate dean of the school of management between 2010 and 2011, and dean of international affairs from 2011 to 2013. Between 2013 and 2016, Chi was director of the Center for Teaching and Learning at NTUST. She was appointed vice chair of the Aviation Safety Council in 2016, serving under Hwung Hwung-hweng and Young Hong-tsu.
