= Sun Lih-chyun =

Taiwanese economist

- 孫立群
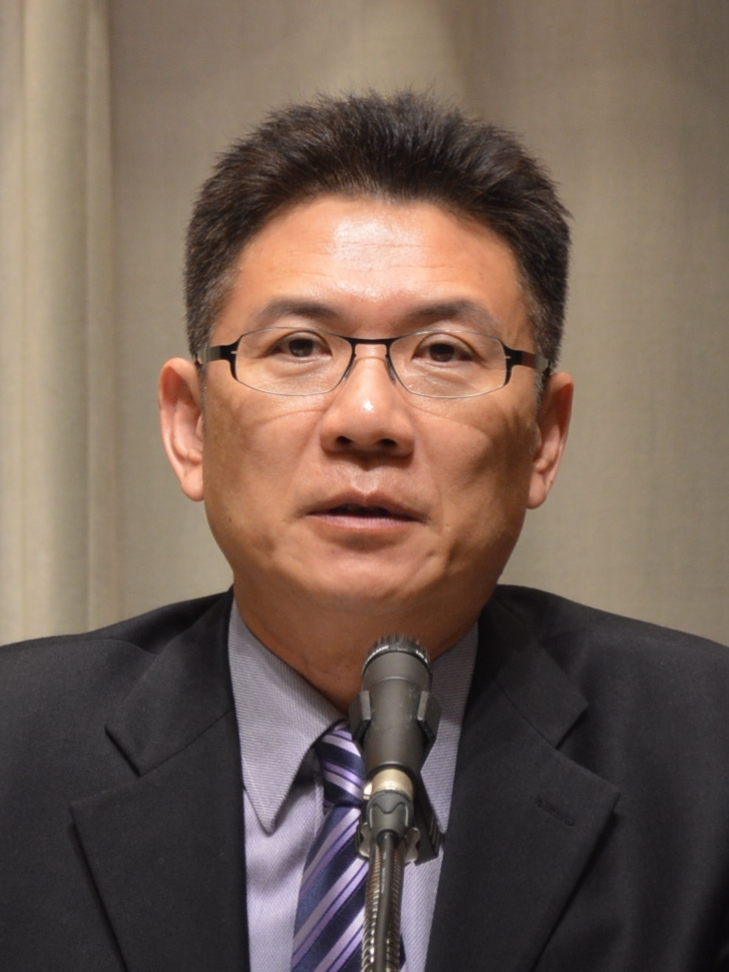
- Sun in 2014

3rd Spokesperson of the Executive Yuan
- In office 7 February 2014 – 20 May 2016
- Prime Minister: Jiang Yi-huah; Mao Chi-kuo; Simon Chang
- Preceded by: Cheng Li-wun
- Succeeded by: Tung Chen-yuan

Vice Chair of the Fair Trade Commission
- In office February 2013 – 7 February 2014
- Chairperson: Wu Shiow-ming

Personal details
- Born: 21 October 1961 (age 64)
- Party: Kuomintang
- Education: Soochow University (BA); Michigan State University (MA, PhD)

Sun Lih-chyun (Chinese: 孫立群; pinyin: Sūn Lìqún; born 21 October 1961) is a Taiwanese economist who served as the spokesperson of the Executive Yuan from 2014 to 2016 and vice chairperson of the Fair Trade Commission from 2013 to 2014.

== Education ==
Sun graduated from Soochow University with a bachelor's degree in economics in 1984. He then completed graduate studies in the United States, where he earned a Master of Arts (M.A.) in economics in 1988 and his Ph.D. in agricultural economics in 1993, both from Michigan State University. His doctoral dissertation, completed under economist John Hoehn, was titled, "Correcting for Self-Selection Bias in Contingent Valuation".

== Early career ==
Sun was an adjunct associate professor in the department of economics of National Chung Hsing University in 1993–1994. He then became the associate professor of the department of agriculture economics of National Taiwan University.
