= Wu Shiow-ming =

Taiwanese legal scholar

- 吳秀明

Chairperson of Fair Trade Commission of the Republic of China
- In office 1 August 2009 – 31 January 2017
- Deputy: Sun Lih-chyun; Chiu Yung-ho
- Preceded by: Tang Jinn-chuan
- Succeeded by: Huang Mei-ying

Personal details
- Born: 2 June 1960 (age 65) Taiwan
- Education: National Chengchi University (LLB, LLM); LMU Munich (PhD)

Wu Shiow-ming (Chinese: 吳秀明; pinyin: Wú Xiùmíng; born 2 June 1960) is a Taiwanese legal scholar who is a professor of competition law. He was the Chairperson of the Fair Trade Commission from 1 August 2009 to 31 January 2017.

== Education ==
Wu obtained his bachelor's and master's degrees in law from National Chengchi University (NCCU) in 1983 and 1986, respectively. He then completed doctoral studies in Germany, where he earned his Ph.D. in law from LMU Munich in 1995. His doctoral dissertation was titled, "Die Ausnahmeregelungen vom Kartellverbot im Fair-Trade-Gesetz der Republik China auf Taiwan in vergleichender Betrachtung mit dem deutschen Kartellrecht".

== Early career ==
Upon graduation from Germany, Wu became a professor at the College of Law of NCCU. He served as an adjunct professor of the Institute of Technology Law at National Chiao Tung University from 2001 to 2008.
