= Huang Yen-nun =

Taiwanese computer scientist (born 1960)

- 黃彥男
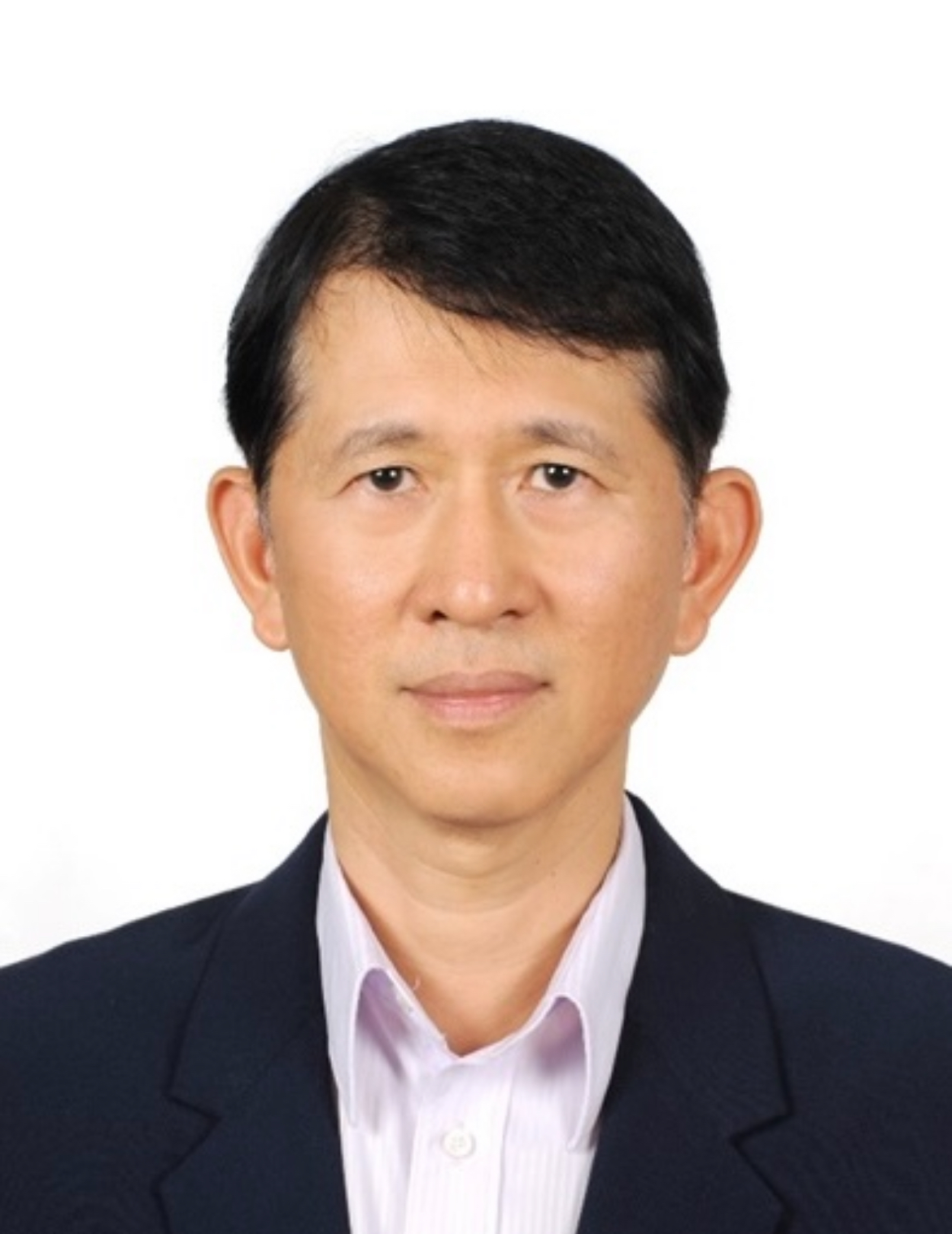
- Official portrait, 2024

2nd Minister of Digital Affairs
- In office 20 May 2024 – 1 September 2025
- Prime Minister: Cho Jung-tai
- Preceded by: Audrey Tang
- Succeeded by: Lin Yi-jing

Personal details
- Born: 11 August 1960 (age 65) Taiwan
- Party: Independent
- Education: National Taiwan University (BS); University of Maryland, College Park (MS, PhD)

Huang Yen-nun (Chinese: 黃彥男; pinyin: Huáng Yànnán; born 11 August 1960) is a Taiwanese computer scientist who served as Minister of Digital Affairs from 2024 to 2025.

== Education ==
Huang graduated from National Taiwan University with a bachelor's degree in electrical engineering, then completed graduate studies in the United States at the University of Maryland, College Park, where he earned his Master of Science (M.S.) and Ph.D. in information science and computer science in 1989. His doctoral dissertation, completed under computer scientist Satish K. Tripathi, was titled, "Resource Allocation with Fault Tolerance".

== Career ==
Huang worked successively for AT&T Labs from 2004 to 2007, the Institute for Information Industry from 2007 to 2008, was president of VeeTIME Corporation from 2008 to 2011, and served on the Executive Yuan's Board of Science and Technology from 2011 to 2015, after which he became a distinguished research fellow with Academia Sinica's Research Center for Information Technology Innovation.

Huang was elected Fellow of the Institute of Electrical and Electronics Engineers (IEEE) in 2012, "for contributions to fault tolerant and failure avoidance software".

On 16 April 2024, Huang was appointed Minister of Digital Affairs in premier Cho Jung-tai's incoming cabinet. He resigned the post on 22 August 2025, and began serving as head of Academia Sinica's Taiwan Information Security Center before the end of the year.
