= Ministry of Sports (Taiwan) =

Taiwanese ministry in charge of sports

- 運動部

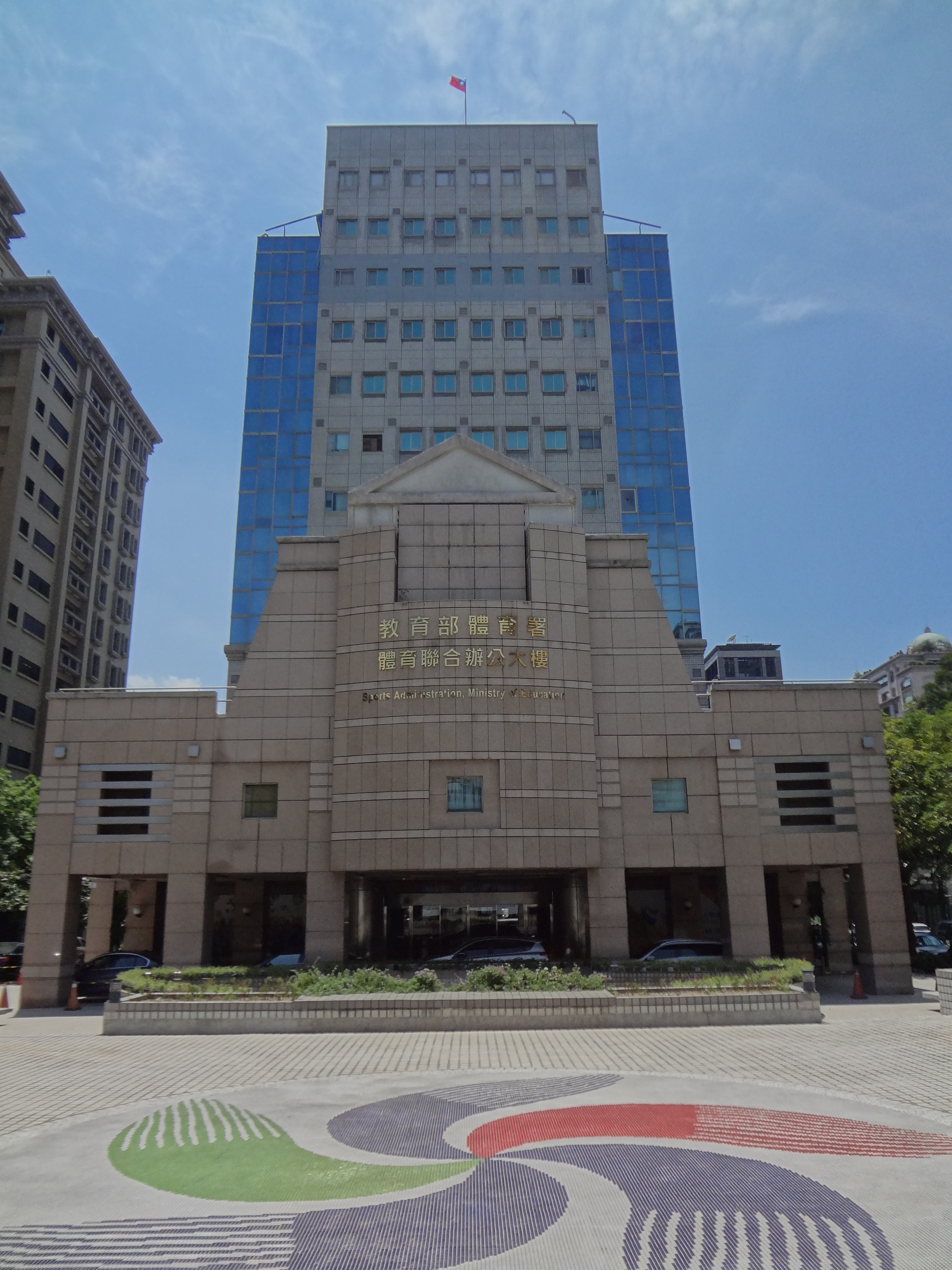

Agency overview
- Formed: 1923 (With "Sports Council"); September 9, 2025 (With "Ministry of Sports")
- Preceding agencies: Sports Council; Citizens' Sports Commission; Sports Affairs Council; Sports Administration
- Jurisdiction: Taiwan
- Headquarters: Zhongshan, Taipei, Taiwan; 25°02′59.3″N 121°32′22.0″E
- Employees: About 400
- Annual budget: About NT$20 billion
- Minister responsible: Lee Yang, Sports Minister
- Parent agency: Executive Yuan
- Website: www.sports.gov.tw

The Ministry of Sports (MOS; Chinese: 運動部) is a cabinet-level ministry of Taiwan that is responsible for the development of the sport industry and the promotion of competitive and recreational sports.

== Background and planning ==
=== Sports Administration, Ministry of Education ===
The earliest sports body of the Republic of China was the "Sports Council" (體育委員會) under the Ministry of Education established in 1932. The Sports Council was renamed the "National Sports Council" (國民體育委員會), and the "Office of Sports" (體育司) in 1973. On 12 January 1998, the "Sports Affairs Council" of the Executive Yuan (行政院體育委員會) was promulgated. Starting 1 January 2013, the council became the Sports Administration (教育部體育署) and placed under the Ministry of Education.

The seal of the former Sports Affairs Council consisted of three different colors: blue, green, and red. The color blue represented freedom and energy; green represented development, nature, health, and harmony; and red represented passion. The shape of the seal was combined with three elements: ume, sun, and human. The ume was used as it is the national flower of the ROC. The sun represented energy and the human represented humanity.

=== Establishment ===
In May 2024, President Lai Ching-te announced plans to establish a sports development ministry to promote the sports industry and elevate the athletic competitiveness of Taiwan.

Following the 2024 Summer Olympics, an advisory panel of top Taiwanese athletes was formed as part of the preparatory team tasked with upgrading the existing Sports Administration to a ministry. The panel included badminton player Lee Yang, table tennis player Chuang Chih-yuan, and judoka Lien Chen-ling.

In October 2024, the Cho cabinet approved the plan to establish a ministry of sports by August 2025, with a budget of NT$20 billion (approximately US$622 million). In January 2025, the Legislative Yuan passed the third and final reading of the bill introduced by the cabinet to establish a sports ministry.

The ministry was established on 9 September 2025.

== Logo design ==
Government officials unveiled the logo for the ministry in May 2025, a design inspired by baseball player Chen Chieh-hsien's hand gesture at the championship game of the 2024 WBSC Premier12. Chen formed a square in front of his chest to symbolize "Taiwan", a word missing on the team's jersey.

== Structure ==
According to the approved plan, the new ministry is in charge of national centers for training, industry development, and scientific research related to sports. It consists of six departments: international affairs, athletics, industry and technology, facilities planning, comprehensive planning, and adaptive sports.

=== Administrative agency ===
- Sports for All Agency
