= Hsu Jan-yau =

Taiwanese politician

- 許璋瑤
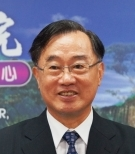

Minister of Mongolian and Tibetan Affairs Commission of the Republic of China
- In office 8 February 2017 – 15 September 2017
- Preceded by: Lin Mei-chu
- Succeeded by: Position abolished

Governor of Taiwan Province
- In office 1 July 2016 – 6 November 2017
- Preceded by: Shih Jun-ji
- Succeeded by: Wu Tze-cheng

Minister without Portfolio
- In office 20 May 2016 – 3 November 2017
- Succeeded by: Wu Tze-cheng

Minister of Directorate-General of Budget, Accounting and Statistics of the Republic of China
- In office 20 May 2004 – 20 May 2008
- Preceded by: Liu San-chi (劉三錡)
- Succeeded by: Shih Su-mei

Deputy Minister of Directorate-General of Budget, Accounting and Statistics of the Republic of China
- In office 2002–2004
- Minister: Liu San-chi

Personal details
- Born: 8 August 1951 (age 74)
- Education: National Cheng Kung University (BS); National Chengchi University (MS)

Hsu Jan-yau (Chinese: 許璋瑤; pinyin: Xǔ Zhāngyáo; born 8 August 1951) is a Taiwanese politician who was the chairman of the Taiwan Stock Exchange.

== Education ==
Hsu obtained his bachelor's degree in accounting and statistics from National Cheng Kung University in 1974 and master's degree in statistics from National Chengchi University in 1976.

== Political career ==
Hsu was named a minister without portfolio in April 2016 and took office on 20 May. On 1 July, he was appointed Chairperson of the Provincial Government of Taiwan Province. Hsu served until November 2017, when he was named chairman of the Taiwan Stock Exchange.
