= Chang Yu-hern =

Taiwanese engineer and educator

- 張有恆
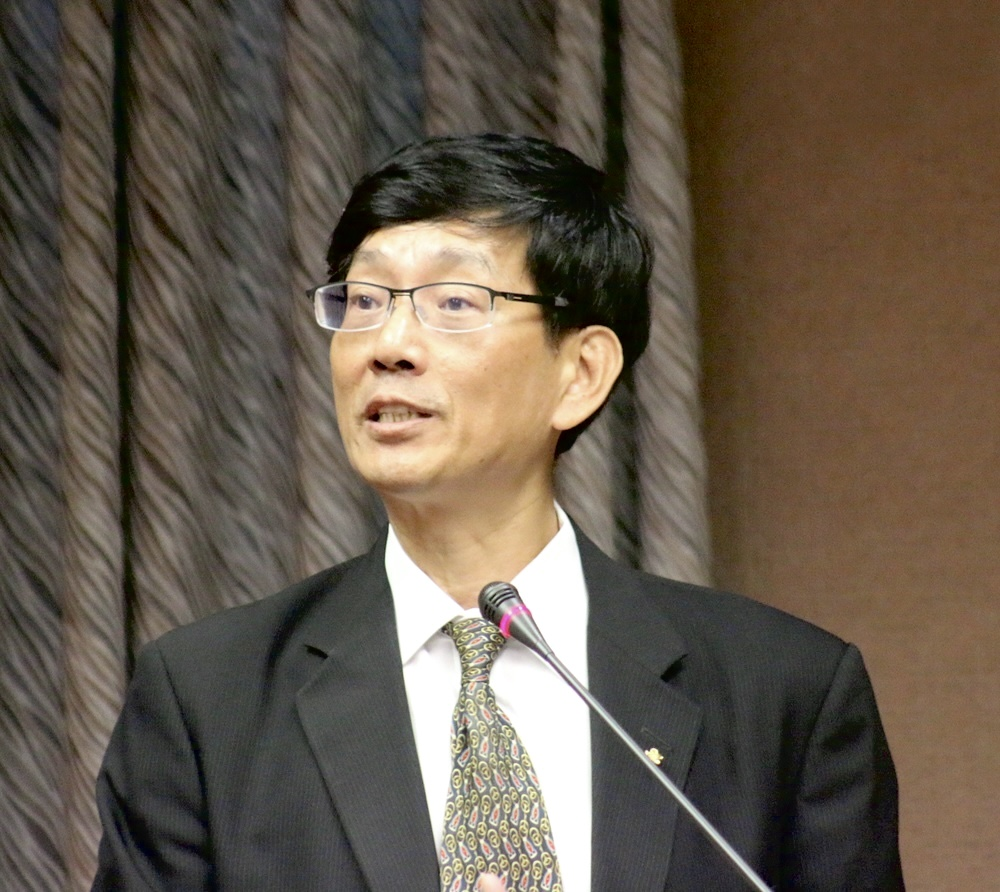

Chairman of Aviation Safety Council of the Republic of China
- In office 25 May 2010 – 31 July 2015
- Vice: Michael Gau
- Preceded by: Wu Jing-shown
- Succeeded by: Shen Chi

Personal details
- Born: 25 January 1954 (age 72)
- Education: National Cheng Kung University (BS); National Chiao Tung University (MS); University of Pennsylvania (PhD)

Chang Yu-hern (Chinese: 張有恆; pinyin: Zhāng Yǒuhéng; born 25 January 1954) is a Taiwanese engineer and educator. He served as Chairman of the Aviation Safety Council between 2010 and 2015.

== Education ==
Chang graduated from National Cheng Kung University with a Bachelor of Science (B.S.) in mechanical engineering in 1976. He then earned a Master of Science (M.S.) in traffic and transportation from National Chiao Tung University in 1978 and completed doctoral studies in the United States, where he earned his Ph.D. in civil engineering from the University of Pennsylvania. His doctoral dissertation, completed under Professor Edward K. Morlok, was titled, "Simultaneous optimization of the design and operations plan of scheduled mass transit lines".

== Aviation Safety Council Chairmanship ==
=== Aviation Safety Council Chairmanship appointment ===
Upon his appointment as Chairman of the Aviation Safety Council (ASC), Chang said that he had set a goal of zero aviation accidents. Having served as the Director-General of Civil Aeronautics Administration, he would continue to promote and elevate flight safety with his administrative experience and professional knowledge of flight safety management. His top priority would be to reorganized the ASC and make it an official, independent government organization in coordination with the Executive Yuan. His second priority would be to conduct investigations of aviation accidents that do not involve major affairs, airplane crashes and passenger mortality within one year and figure out the real cause.
