= Shih Su-mei =

Politician of Taiwan

- 石素梅
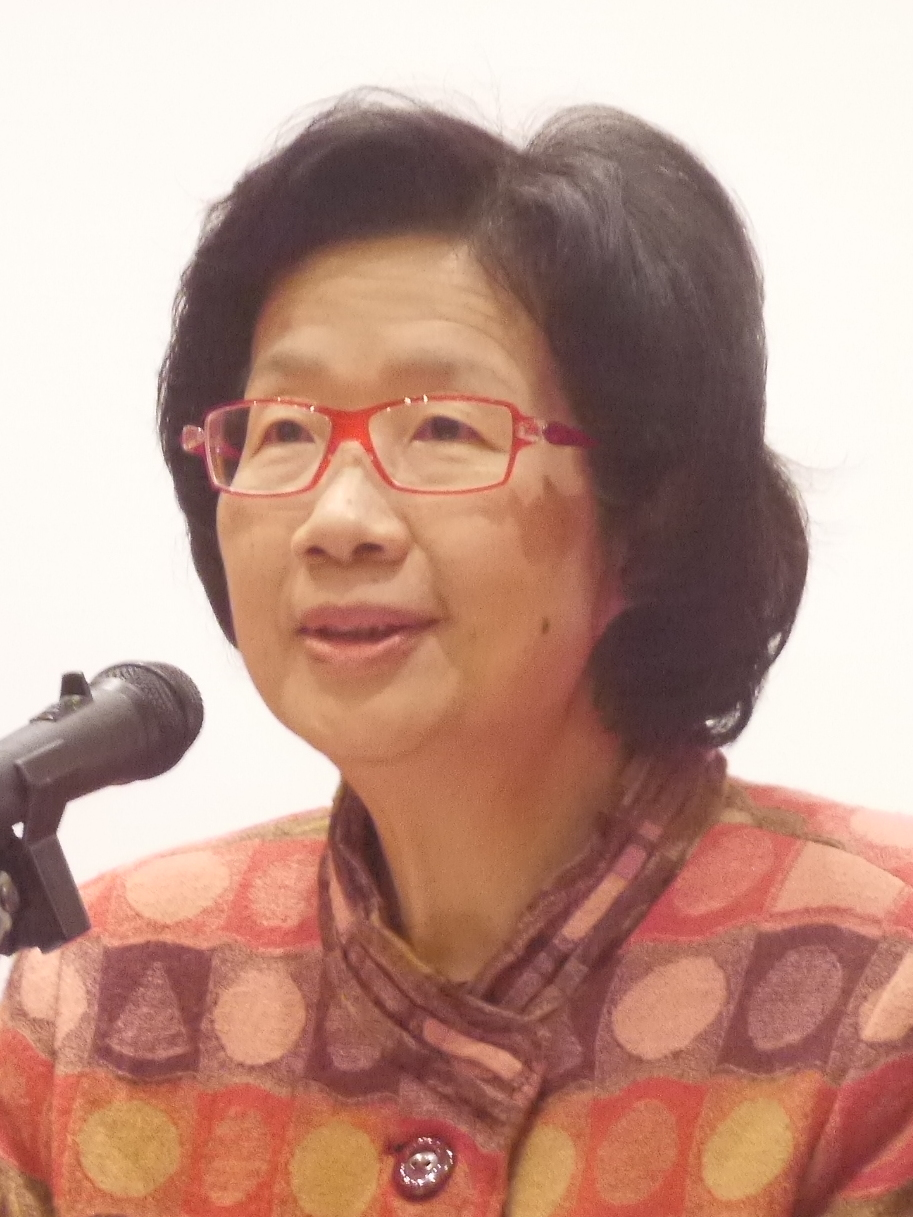

Minister of Directorate General of Budget, Accounting and Statistics of the Republic of China
- In office 20 May 2008 – 20 May 2016
- Deputy: Luh Dun-jin
- Preceded by: Hsu Jan-yau
- Succeeded by: Chu Tzer-ming

Personal details
- Born: 20 July 1952 (age 74) Taipei, Taiwan
- Party: Kuomintang
- Education: National Taiwan University (BBA)

Shih Su-mei (Chinese: 石素梅; pinyin: Shí Sùméi; born 20 July 1952) is a Taiwanese politician. She was the Minister of the Directorate General of Budget, Accounting and Statistics of the Executive Yuan from 2008 to 2016.

== Education ==
Shih earned her bachelor's degree in business administration from National Taiwan University.
