= Lee Chung-wei =

Taiwanese politician (born 1952)

- 李仲威
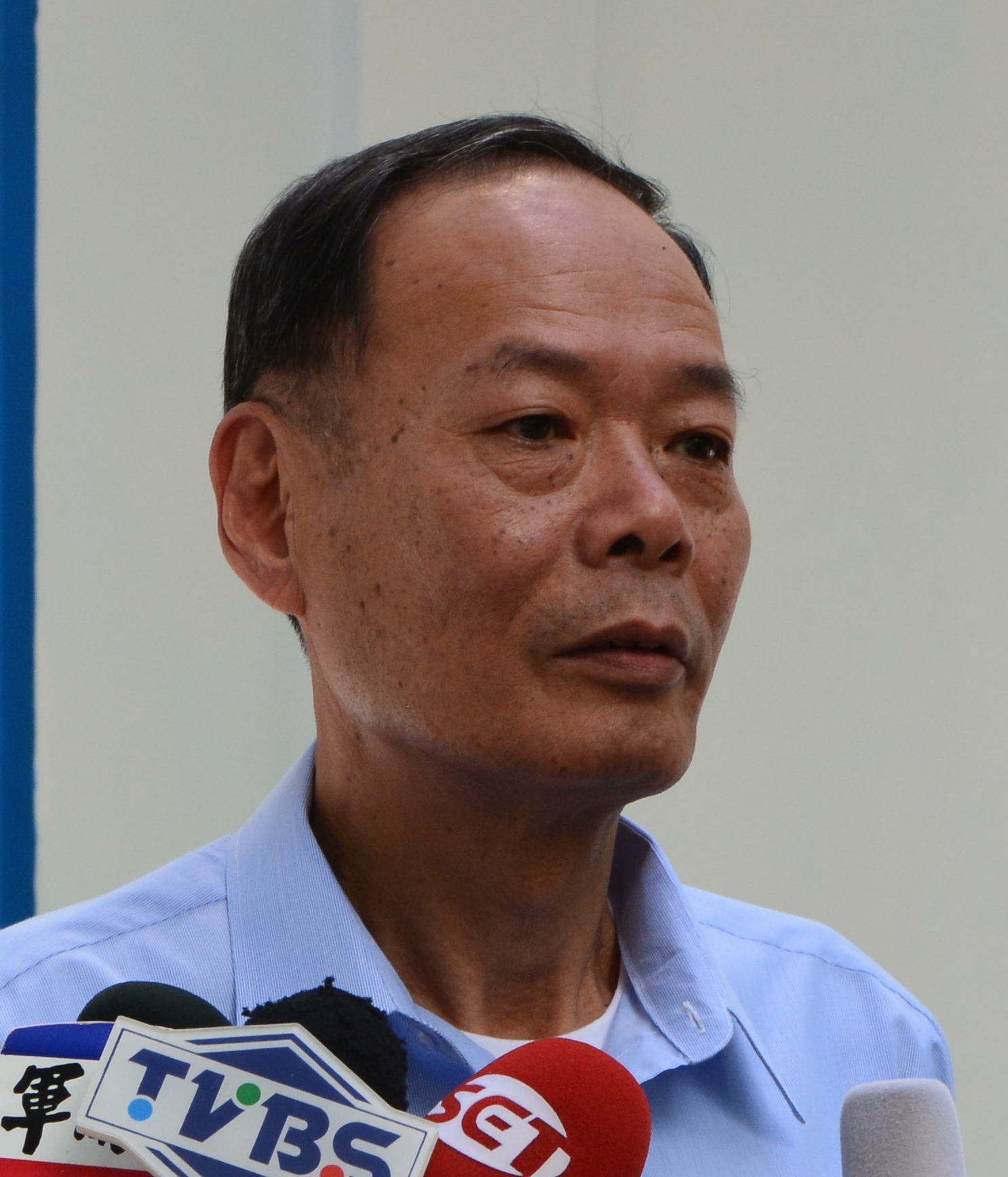
- Lee in 2016

2nd Minister of Ocean Affairs
- In office 14 January 2019 – 1 September 2022; Acting: 14 January 2019 – 13 February 2019
- Preceded by: Hwung Hwung-hweng
- Succeeded by: Chou Mei-wu (a.i.); Kuan Bi-ling
Previous positions
Deputy Minister of Ocean Affairs
In office 28 April 2018 – 13 January 2019
| Minister | Hwung Hwung-hweng |
| Preceded by | Position established |
| Succeeded by | Chen Yang-yih |
Director-General of the Coast Guard Administration
In office 20 May 2016 – 12 February 2019
| Prime Minister | Lin Chuan; Lai Ching-te |
| Preceded by | Wang Chung-yi |
| Succeeded by | Chen Kuo-en |
Administrative Deputy Minister of National Defense
In office June 2005 – August 2006
| Minister | Lee Jye |

Personal details
- Born: 14 December 1952 (age 73) Hsinchu City, Taiwan
- Education: Republic of China Naval Academy (BA); National Defense University

Lee Chung-wei (Chinese: 李仲威; pinyin: Lǐ Zhòngwēi; born 14 December 1952) is a Taiwanese politician and naval Vice Admiral. He served as the minister of the Ocean Affairs Council from 2019 to 2022.

== Education ==
Lee received his bachelor's degree from the Republic of China Naval Academy in 1975 and completed further studies at the National Defense University in the Naval Command and Staff College and the War College in 1987 and 1989, respectively.

== Political careers ==
Lee was appointed as the director-general of the Coast Guard Administration on 20 May 2016. On 28 April 2018, the Ocean Affairs Council was established, and the Coast Guard Administration was placed under it. Lee was then appointed as the deputy minister of the council.

On 14 January 2019, Minister Hwung Hwung-hweng resigned; Lee was then named acting Minister of Ocean Affairs until the appointment became permanent the following month. Lee resigned in late 2022 for family reasons; Chou Mei-wu was named acting minister until congresswoman Kuan Bi-ling was named new permanent minister the following year.

== See also ==
- Executive Yuan
