= Lin Yi-jing =

Taiwanese computer scientist (born 1965)

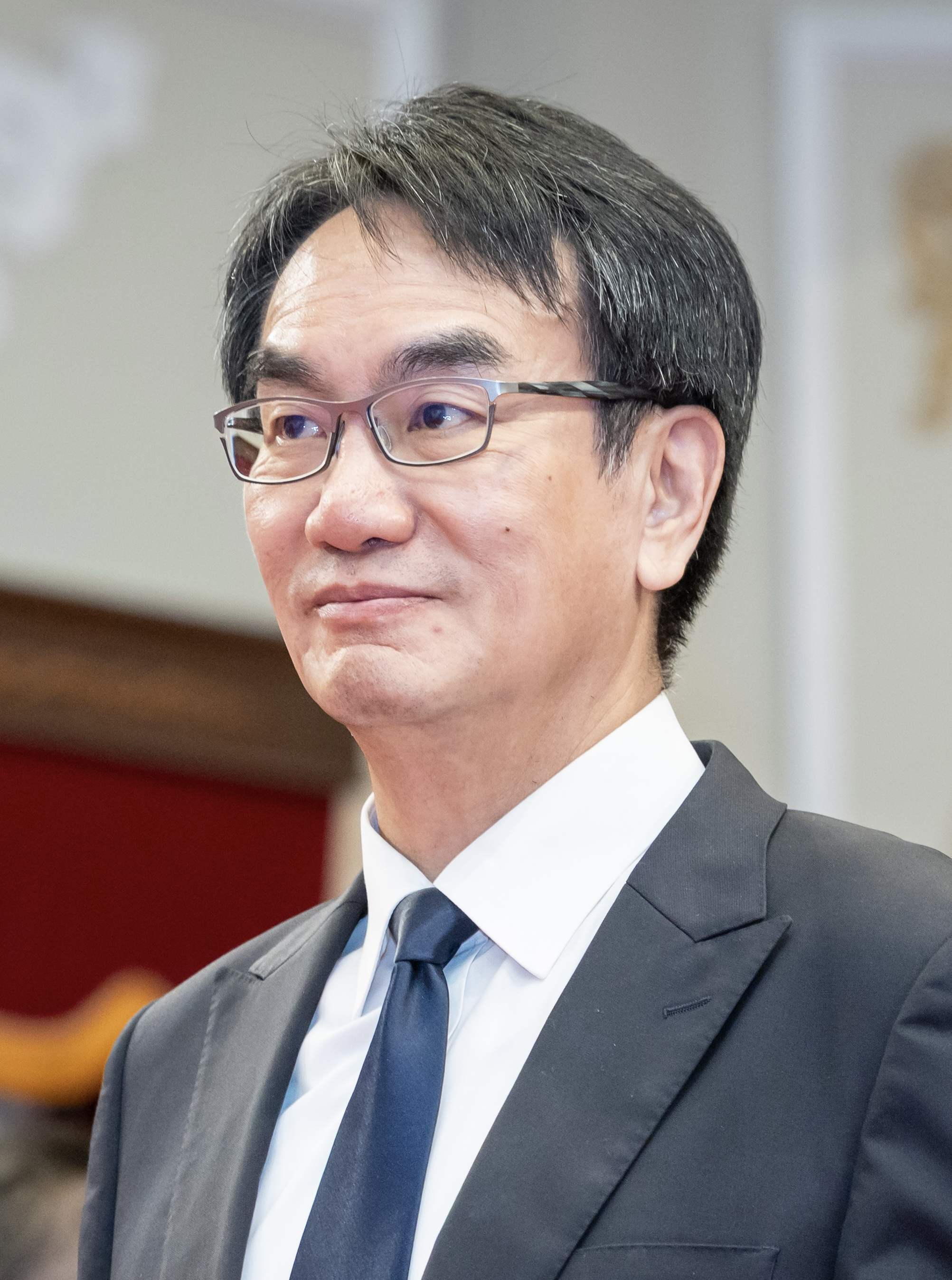
- Lin in 2025

3rd Minister of Digital Affairs
- Incumbent
- Assumed office September 1, 2025
- Preceded by: Huang Yen-nun

Personal details
- Born: March 10, 1965 (age 61)
- Education: National Taiwan University (BS); Brown University (MS, PhD)
- Scientific career
- Fields: Computer science
- Thesis: Configuration management in terms of logical structures (1996)

Lin Yi-jing (Chinese: 林宜敬; pinyin: Lín Yíjìng; born March 10, 1965) is a Taiwanese computer scientist and entrepreneur who has been Minister of Digital Affairs since 2025.

== Early life and education ==
Lin was born on March 10, 1965, in Taichung, Taiwan. His mother, Ling Yue (嶺月), was a writer. He graduated from National Taiwan University with a Bachelor of Science in computer science and information engineering in 1987. After graduation, he served as a second lieutenant in the Republic of China Army from 1987 to 1989.

Lin completed graduate studies in the U.S., earning a Master of Science (M.S.) in 1992 and his Ph.D. in computer science from Brown University in 1995. His doctoral dissertation, completed under computer scientist Steven P. Reiss, was titled, "Configuration management in terms of logical structures".

== Career ==
After receiving his doctorate, Lin was a postdoctoral researcher for IBM Research at the Thomas J. Watson Research Center from 1995 to 1996. He was then deputy manager of the management information system (MIS) of Compeq Manufacturing Co., Ltd., a circuit-manufacturing company in Taoyuan, Taiwan, from 1996 to 1999 and then the director of product research and development (R&D) at Trend Micro from 1999 to 2001.

In 2002, Lin founded L. Labs Inc., an artificial intelligence (AI) language-teaching company, and was its chief executive officer (CEO) until 2024, when he was appointed deputy minister of the Ministry of Digital Affairs.

=== Minister of Digital Affairs (2025–present) ===
In August 2025, President Lai Ching-te announced that he had named Lin to succeed Huang Yen-nun as the head of the new Ministry of Digital Affairs. Lin took office as the new Minister of Digital Affairs on September 1, 2025.
