= Ocean Affairs Council =

Government agency of Taiwan

- 海洋委員會; Hǎiyáng Wěiyuánhuì (Mandarin); Hói-yòng Vî-yèn-fi (Hakka)

Agency overview
- Formed: 28 April 2018
- Jurisdiction: Taiwan
- Headquarters: Cianjhen, Kaohsiung (Kaohsiung Software Park)
- Minister responsible: Kuan Bi-ling
- Deputy Ministers responsible: Chen Guo-en; Chuang Ching-ta; Tsai Ching-piao
- Parent agency: Executive Yuan
- Child agency: Coast Guard Administration
- Website: Official website

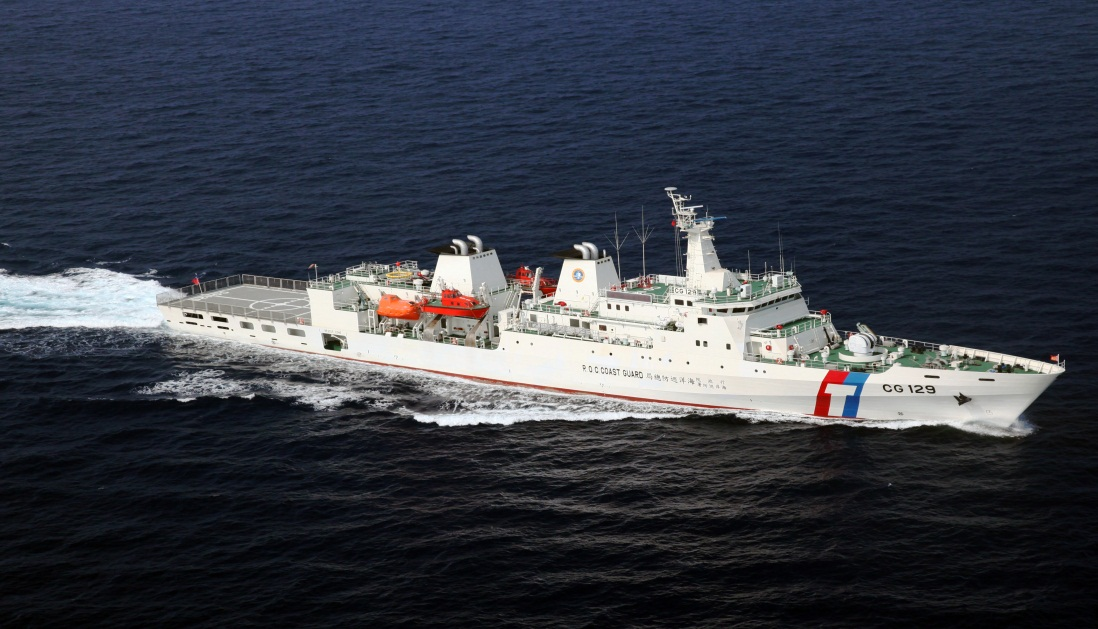
3000-ton patrol vessel of the Coast Guard Administration

The Ocean Affairs Council (OAC; traditional Chinese: 海洋委員會; simplified Chinese: 海洋委员会; pinyin: Hǎiyáng Wěiyuánhuì; Pe̍h-ōe-jī: Hái-iûⁿ Úi-oân-hōe) is the official governing body in Taiwan (Republic of China) under the Executive Yuan in charge of the planning, coordination and implementation of marine-related policies.

== History ==
The Organization Act of the Ocean Affairs Council was formulated and promulgated on 1 July 2015. It was initially planned to be inaugurated in July 2016 but was delayed due to disagreements in the Legislative Yuan. The council was eventually inaugurated on 28 April 2018 by Premier William Lai.

In December 2020, the Ocean Affairs Council clarified that in the event of an attack on a Coast Guard vessel, the head of the Ocean Affairs Council has the right to order them to return fire. In the event that communications with headquarters are blocked, the highest ranking local officer can then make the decision to return fire.

== Organizational structure ==
- Coast Guard Administration
- National Academy of Marine Research
- Ocean Conservation Administration

== Chairpersons ==
Non-partisan/ unknown Democratic Progressive Party

No.	Name	Term of Office		Days	Party	Cabinet
1	Hwung Hwung-hweng (黃煌煇)	28 April 2018	13 January 2019	260		William Lai
–	Lee Chung-wei (李仲威)	14 January 2019	14 February 2019	31	Independent	Su Tseng-chang II
2	Lee Chung-wei (李仲威)	15 February 2019	1 September 2022	1294	Independent	Su Tseng-chang II
–	Chou Mei-wu (周美伍)	2 September 2022	30 January 2023	150	Independent	Su Tseng-chang II
3	Kuan Bi-ling (管碧玲)	31 January 2023	Incumbent	1286	Democratic Progressive Party	Chen Chien-jen

== See also ==
- Maritime industries of Taiwan
