= Young Hong-tsu =

Taiwanese mechanical engineer

- 楊宏智
- Born: Taiwan
- Education: National Taiwan University (BSc); University of New South Wales (PhD, 1986)
- Occupations: Mechanical engineer, professor, public administrator
- Employer: National Taiwan University
- Known for: Inaugural Chairperson of the Taiwan Transportation Safety Board, Femtosecond laser processing, 5-axis CAM for aeronautical applications
- Title: Distinguished Professor, NTU Department of Mechanical Engineering

Young Hong-tsu (Chinese: 楊宏智; pinyin: Yáng Hóngzhì) is a Taiwanese mechanical engineer.

== Education and career ==
Young Hong-tsu graduated from the National Taiwan University Department of Mechanical Engineering with a bachelor's of science degree prior to completing doctoral studies at the University of New South Wales School of Mechanical and Manufacturing Engineering in 1986. Between his baccalaureate and doctoral studies, he was a teaching assistant at National Taiwan University. Young returned to teach at NTU as an associate professor in 1989, and was named a full professor in 1994. By 2005, Young attained distinguished professor status.

Young later served as Aviation Safety Council managing director between 2005 and 2009. In this position, Young commented on the malfunctioning brakes of Uni Air flight B7901 in April 2008, and safety issues on flights between Taiwan and China in April 2009. His appointment as Aviation Safety Council chairman was announced in June 2018, and he formally succeeded Hwung Hwung-hweng on 4 July 2018. Following the 2018 Yilan train derailment in November, premier William Lai expanded the purview of the ASC via a directive. Proposed legislation regarding the ASC reformation began the draft process later that month. It took the form of an amendment to the Organizational Act of the Aviation Safety Council. The amendments were approved by the Legislative Yuan in April 2019. The renaming of the council to the Taiwan Transportation Safety Board was announced in July 2019, and took effect on 1 August 2019, with Young remaining in the chairmanship role. Young resigned his position on 11 February 2023, amidst an investigation into allegations that he had used an official vehicle to visit hot springs and restaurants in Yilan County. Iris Hsu succeeded Young as acting chair.
