= Lin Wan-i =

Taiwanese sociologist and politician

- 林萬億
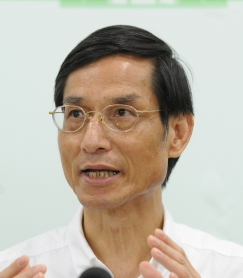

Minister without Portfolio of the Executive Yuan
- Incumbent
- Assumed office 20 May 2016
- In office 2006–2007

Deputy Magistrate of Taipei County
- In office 1999–2002
- Magistrate: Su Tseng-chang

Personal details
- Born: 1952 (age 73–74)
- Education: National Taiwan University (BA, MA); University of California, Berkeley (PhD)

Lin Wan-i (Chinese: 林萬億; pinyin: Lín Wànyì; Pe̍h-ōe-jī: Lîm Bān-ek) is a Taiwanese sociologist, academic, and minister without portfolio of the Executive Yuan, having taken office on 20 May 2016.

== Education ==
Lin obtained his bachelor's and master's degrees in sociology from National Taiwan University in 1979 and 1981, respectively, and doctoral degree in social welfare from the University of California, Berkeley, in the United States.

== Career ==
Lin held multiple academic positions in the departments of sociology and social work at National Taiwan University from 1982 to the present. He served as a minister without portfolio under the Executive Yuan from 2006 to 2007 and again from 2016 to the present.
