= Ministry of Digital Affairs (Taiwan) =

Taiwanese Ministry

- 數位發展部
- Logo of Ministry of Digital Affairs

Agency overview
- Formed: 27 August 2022
- Headquarters: 143 Yanping S. Road, Zhongzheng District, Taipei
- Minister responsible: Yi-Jing Lin
- Website: moda.gov.tw

The Ministry of Digital Affairs (MODA; Chinese: 數位發展部; pinyin: Shùwèi Fāzhǎn Bù) is a cabinet-level governmental body of Taiwan, in charge of all policy and regulation of information, telecommunications, communications, information security, and the internet in Taiwan.

== Background ==
Following the passage of an amendment to the Organizational Act of the Executive Yuan in 2010, the number of agencies within the Executive Yuan was to be reduced from 37 to 29. This included the transfer of some duties from the Ministry of Transportation and Communications and the National Communications Commission to what would become the Ministry of Digital Affairs. The Ministry of Digital Affairs assumed oversight of select portfolios from the Ministry of Economic Affairs and the Executive Yuan's Department of Cyber Security as well. These included government information security, digital services and data management, alongside the development of industries related to the digital economy. The digital ministry's duties were to integrate and develop policy for telecommunication, information, cybersecurity, the Internet and communication industries. The agency was also responsible for maintenance and management of digital resources and infrastructure, and expected to foster a positive environment for the development of new technologies.

The Executive Yuan declared the founding of a digital development ministry a legislative priority in February 2021. By March, assorted amendments had been proposed for legislative review and minister without portfolio Kuo Yau-hwang was selected convenor of the digital ministry's preparatory office. The Legislative Yuan approbated the establishment of the Ministry of Digital Affairs by passing an amendment to the National Communications Commission Organization Act and approving the Organization Act of the Ministry of Digital Affairs in December 2021. By March 2022, Kuo Yau-hwang had been replaced by Audrey Tang. She was heavily involved in setting up the Ministry of Digital Affairs, and was duly appointed the agency's founding minister. The Ministry of Digital Affairs was inaugurated on 27 August 2022. The Organization Act for the Ministry of Digital Affairs limits the ministry to 598 employees.

== History ==
The ministry has engaged in the research and development of drone carried cell sites for disaster response purposes.

== Organisation ==
The ministry is headed by a minister, two political deputy ministers, one administrative deputy minister, and one chief secretary.

=== Implementation units ===
- Department of Digital Strategy
- Department of Communications and Cyber Resilience
- Department of Resource Management
- Department of Digital Service
- Department of International Cooperation
- Department of Data Innovation

=== Subordinate agencies and non-departmental public bodies ===
- Administration for Cyber Security
- Administration for Digital Industries
- Institute for Information Industry
- Telecom Technology Center
- Taiwan Network Information Center
- National Institute for Cyber Security

== List of ministers ==
Political Party: Kuomintang Non-partisan/ unknown Democratic Progressive Party

No.	Name	Portrait	Term of office		Days	Party	Cabinet
1	Audrey Tang (唐鳳)		27 August 2022	20 May 2024	632	Independent	Su Tseng-chang II; Chen Chien-jen
2	Huang Yen-nun (黃彥男)		20 May 2024	1 September 2025	469	Independent	Cho Jung-tai
3	Yi-Jing Lin (林宜敬)		1 September 2025	Incumbent	341	Independent	Cho Jung-tai

== See also ==
- Digital democracy in Taiwan
