= Huang Mei-ying =

Taiwanese economist

- 黃美瑛

Chairperson of Fair Trade Commission of the Republic of China
- In office 1 February 2017 – 30 January 2023
- Deputy: Perng Shaw-jiin
- Preceded by: Wu Shiow-ming
- Succeeded by: Lee May

Personal details
- Education: National Taiwan University (BS, MS); University of Georgia (PhD)

Huang Mei-ying (Chinese: 黃美瑛; pinyin: Huáng Měiyīng) is a Taiwanese economist. She served as the Chairperson of Fair Trade Commission from 2017 to 2023.

== Education ==
Huang graduated from National Taiwan University with a bachelor's degree and a master's degree in agricultural economics. She then earned her Ph.D. in economics from the University of Georgia in 1987. Her doctoral dissertation was titled, "The Delineation of Economic Markets".

== Fair Trade Commission ==
After being sworn in as the chairperson of Fair Trade Commission on 1 February 2017 alongside deputy Perng Shaw-jiin, Huang said that she planned to further promote cooperation and coordination between ministry agencies to achieve market liberalization and improve fair trade competition in Taiwan by revising relevant laws and regulations, improving control of multi-level marketing, increasing international exchanges and participating in cross-border cooperation.
