= Taiwan Transportation Safety Board =

Government safety body

Coordinates: 24.984269°N 121.541404°E

- 國家運輸安全調查委員會

Agency overview
- Formed: 25 May 1998; 28 years ago (as the Aviation Safety Committee)
- Preceding agencies: Aviation Safety Committee; Aviation Safety Council
- Jurisdiction: Government of the Republic of China
- Headquarters: Xindian District, New Taipei City, Taiwan
- Agency executives: Chairman; Chi Chia-fen, Vice Chairman
- Website: www.ttsb.gov.tw

Taiwan Transportation Safety Board
- Traditional Chinese: 國家運輸安全調查委員會
- Simplified Chinese: 国家运输安全调查委员会
- Literal meaning: National Transportation Safety Investigation Council
Transcriptions
Standard Mandarin
- Hanyu Pinyin: Guójiā Yùnshū Ānquán Diàochá Wěiyuánhuì
- Bopomofo: ㄍㄨㄛˊ ㄐㄧㄚ ㄩㄣˋ ㄕㄨㄢ ㄑㄩㄢˊ ㄉㄧㄠˋ ㄔㄚˊ ㄨㄟˇ ㄩㄢˊ ㄏㄨㄟˋ
- Wade–Giles: Kuo-chia Yun-shu An-ch'üan Tiao-cha Wei-yüan-hui
- Tongyong Pinyin: Guojia Yunshu Anchyuan Diaocha Weiyuanhuei

Aviation Safety Council
- Traditional Chinese: 飛航安全調查委員會
- Simplified Chinese: 飞航安全调查委员会
- Literal meaning: Aviation Safety Council
Transcriptions
Standard Mandarin
- Hanyu Pinyin: Fēiháng Ānquán Wěiyuánhuì
- Bopomofo: ㄈㄟ ㄏㄤˊ ㄢ ㄑㄩㄢˊ ㄨㄟˇ ㄩㄢˊ ㄏㄨㄟˋ
- Wade–Giles: Fei-hang An-ch'üan Wei-yüan-hui
- Tongyong Pinyin: Feihang Anchyuan Weiyuanhuei

The Taiwan Transportation Safety Board (TTSB, Chinese: 國家運輸安全調查委員會) is an independent government agency of the Republic of China responsible for major transportation accidents on aviation, railways, waterways, and highways in Taiwan. The council is headquartered in Xindian District, New Taipei City. Its headquarters were previously in Songshan District, Taipei.

== History ==
Logo of a predecessor agency, the Aviation Safety Council

The Aviation Safety Committee, later renamed Aviation Safety Council, was established on 25 May 1998 as an independent agency. It was put under the administration of Executive Yuan in May 2001 until 20 May 2012 after which it became an independent body again. On 1 August 2019, the agency was to be renamed "National Transportation Safety Council". Its portfolio expanded to cover major highway and railway incidents alongside aviation safety, and this was done in a response to a perceived shortcoming in the initial ad hoc investigation of the 2018 Yilan train derailment. The English name ultimately chosen was "Taiwan Transportation Safety Board".

== Departmental structure ==
The agency is grouped into the following structure:

=== Investigation Lab ===
- Site Survey
- Flight Recorders Readout
- Performance Analysis
- Data Integration & Simulation
- Engineering Research & Development

=== Flight Safety Division ===
- TACARE Systems
- Safety Improvement Research Projects
- Promotion & Public Affairs
- Safety Recommendations Implementation
- flight Safety Database

=== Occurrence Investigation Division ===
- Response to Occurrence Notification
- Occurrence Investigation
- Safety Recommendations
- Investigation Techniques Research & Development
- Coordination with International Air Safety Organizations

=== Legal and Administration Division ===
- Legal Affairs
- General Affairs
- Account Receivable
- Documentation
- Transportation
- Library

== List of leaders ==
Aviation Safety Committee

- Weng Cheng-yi (25 May 1998 – 19 May 2000)
- Wang Shih-sheng (acting; 20 May 2000 – 23 August 2000)
- Liu Wei-chi (24 August 2000 – 22 May 2001)

Aviation Safety Council, Executive Yuan

- Liu Wei-chi (23 May 2001 – 23 May 2003)
- Kay Yong (24 May 2003 – 30 March 2005)
- Weng Cheng-yi (acting; 1 April 2005 – 11 August 2005)
- Wu Jing-shown (12 August 2005 – 24 August 2010)
- Chang Yu-hern (25 August 2010 – 19 May 2012)

Aviation Safety Council

- Chang Yu-hern (20 May 2012 – 31 July 2015)
- Shen Chi (19 August 2015 – 22 October 2015)
- Liu Pei-ling (acting; 23 October 2015 – 28 December 2015)
- Hwung Hwung-hweng (29 December 2015 – 27 April 2018)
- Young Hong-tsu (4 July 2018 – 31 July 2019)

Taiwan Transportation Safety Board

- Young Hong-tsu (1 August 2019 – 11 February 2023)
- Lin Shinn-Der (31 May 2023 - )

== Transportation ==
ASC headquarters is accessible within walking distance North of Dapinglin Station of the Taipei Metro.

== See also ==
- Transportation in Taiwan
