= Hwung Hwung-hweng =

Taiwanese hydraulic engineer (1946–2019)

- 黃煌煇
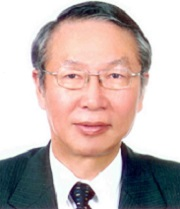

1st Minister of Ocean Affairs
- In office 28 April 2018 – 13 January 2019
- Prime Minister: Lai Ching-te
- Preceded by: Office established
- Succeeded by: Lee Chung-wei

3rd Minister of Aviation
- In office 29 December 2015 – 27 April 2018
- Prime Minister: Mao Chi-kuo; Chang San-cheng; Lin Chuan; Lai Ching-te
- Preceded by: Liu Pei-ling
- Succeeded by: Young Hong-tsu

President of National Cheng Kung University
- In office 1 February 2011 – January 2015
- Preceded by: Michael M. C. Lai
- Succeeded by: Jenny Su

Personal details
- Born: 10 November 1946 Tainan, Taiwan
- Died: 26 July 2019 (aged 72) North District, Tainan, Taiwan
- Education: National Cheng Kung University (BS, MS, PhD)
- Profession: Engineer

Hwung Hwung-hweng (Chinese: 黃煌煇; pinyin: Huáng Huánghuī; 10 November 1946 – 26 July 2019) was a Taiwanese civil engineer, hydraulic engineer, and academic. He was the president of National Cheng Kung University from 2011 to 2015 and served as chairman of the Aviation Safety Council from 2015 to 2018 and minister of the Ocean Affairs Council from 2018 to 2019.

== Early life and education ==
Hwung was born in 1946. After graduating from National Tainan First Senior High School, he studied engineering at National Cheng Kung University, where he earned a Bachelor of Science (B.S.) in hydraulic engineering and marine engineering in 1970, a Master of Science (M.S.) in water conservation and ocean engineering in 1975, and his Ph.D. in civil engineering in 1981.

== Academic career ==
After receiving his doctorate, Hwung joined the NCKU faculty, and was eventually named senior executive vice president.

Hwung was named NCKU president in October 2010, and formally assumed office in February 2011, succeeding Michael M. C. Lai. Hwung also took Lai's position on the Southeast and South Asia and Taiwan Universities Presidents’ Forum. Hwung supported a proposal for Taiwanese universities to accept more Chinese students, as long as admissions standards were not compromised. In January 2014, Hwung wrote an open letter advising against the renaming of a campus plaza to South Banyan Square, citing laws on educational neutrality, as the given name of activist Cheng Nan-jung had political connotations. University students led a demonstration on campus to protest his remarks. Hwung stepped down from the NCKU presidency and was replaced by Jenny Su. He continued teaching at the university and in May 2015, spoke out regarding the need for the government to develop better water management policies.

== Political career ==
He was named chairman of the Aviation Safety Council in December 2015. In this position, he oversaw an investigation into the causes of aviation incidents and undertook additional safety research. He backed calls for an agency independent of the Ministry of Transportation and Communications to probe all transportation incidents. In January 2018, Hwung stated that the government should establish a maritime agency to handle Taiwan's exclusive economic zone. The Ocean Affairs Council began operations in April, with Hwung as founding chairman.

== Death ==
Hwung died at National Cheng Kung University Hospital on 26 July 2019, aged 72.
