= Audrey Tang =

Taiwanese politician and software programmer

Audrey Tang Tang Feng
- 唐鳳
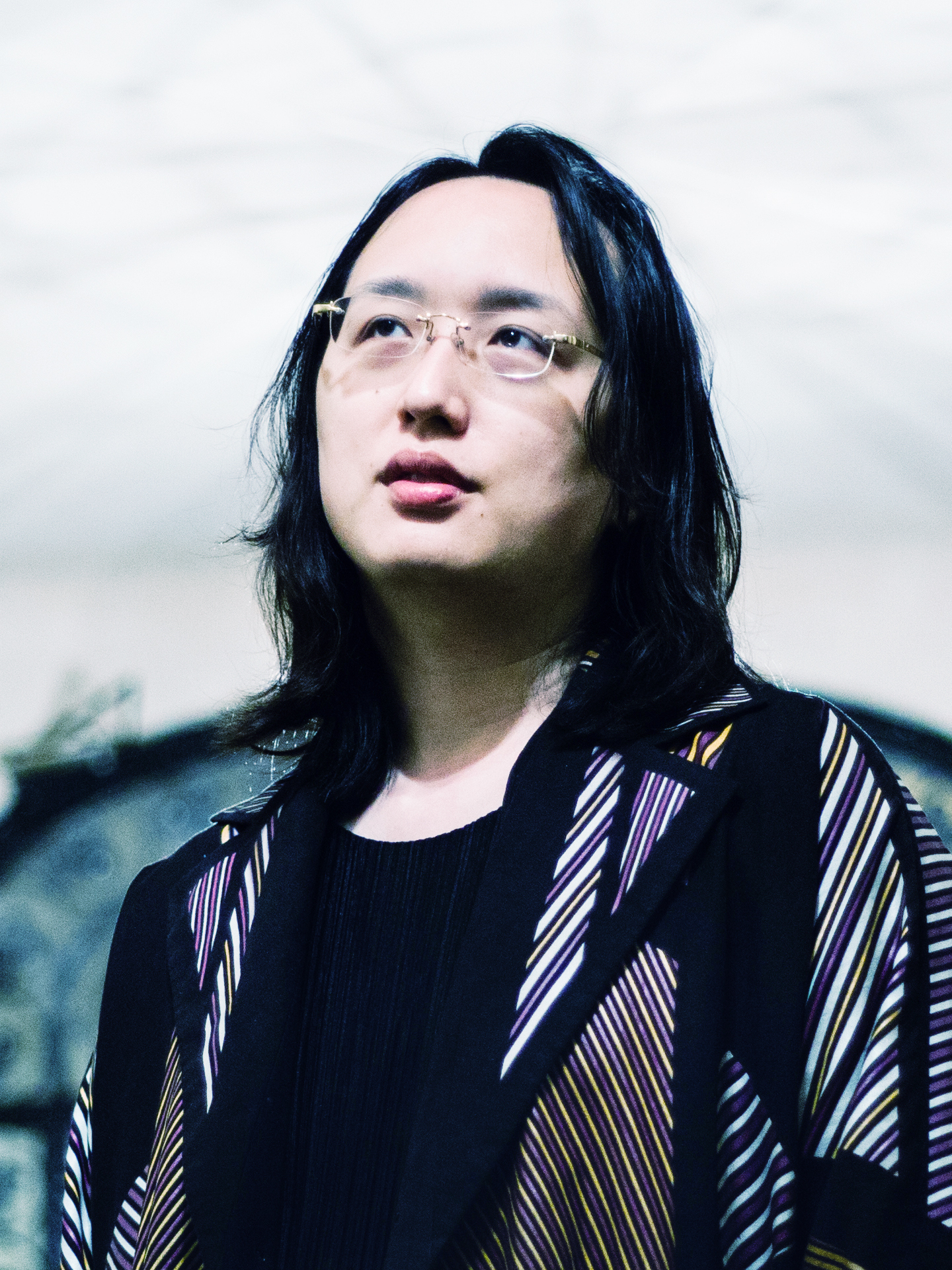
- Official Ministerial Portrait

Taiwanese Ambassador-at-large
- Incumbent
- Assumed office 7 October 2024
- President: Lai Ching-te

1st Minister of Digital Affairs
- In office 27 August 2022 – 20 May 2024
- Prime Minister: Su Tseng-chang; Chen Chien-jen
- Deputy: See list: Huai-Jen Lee Chuei He-ming
- Preceded by: Position established
- Succeeded by: Huang Yen-nun

Minister without Portfolio
- In office 1 October 2016 – 27 August 2022
- Prime Minister: Lin Chuan; Lai Ching-te; Su Tseng-chang

Personal details
- Born: 18 April 1981 (age 45) Taipei, Taiwan
- Party: Independent
- Parents: Tang Kuang-hua (father); Lee Ya-ching (mother)
- Relatives: Bestian Tang (唐宗浩) (brother)
- Profession: Software programmer

Audrey Tang
- Traditional Chinese: 唐鳳
- Simplified Chinese: 唐凤
Transcriptions
Standard Mandarin
- Hanyu Pinyin: Táng Fèng
- Wade–Giles: T'ang^{2} Fêng^{4}
Yue: Cantonese
- Jyutping: Tong^{4} Fung^{6}
Southern Min
- Hokkien POJ: Tông Hōng
- Tâi-lô: Tông Hōng

Tang Feng (Chinese: 唐鳳; pinyin: Táng Fèng; born 18 April 1981), also known by her English name Audrey, is a Taiwanese politician and free software programmer who served as the first Minister of Digital Affairs of Taiwan from August 2022 to May 2024. She has been described as one of the "ten greatest Taiwanese computing personalities". In August 2016, Tang was invited to join Taiwan's Executive Yuan as a minister without portfolio, making her the first transgender person and the first non-binary gender official in the top executive cabinet. Tang has identified as "post-gender" and accepts "whatever pronoun people want to describe me with online." Tang is a leader of the Haskell and Perl programming language communities, and is the core member of g0v. She is on the advisory board of the Schwartz Reisman Institute for Technology and Society.

== Early life ==
Tang was born in Taipei. Her father, Tang Kuang-hua, and mother, Lee Ya-ching, were both writers at the China Times. When she was four, she was diagnosed with a heart condition that had a 50% survival rate. Lee Ya-ching helped develop Taiwan's first consumer co-operative, and co-developed an experimental primary school employing indigenous teachers. Tang was a child prodigy, reading works of classical literature before the age of five, advanced mathematics before six, and programming before eight. Initially, she coded in pencil and paper because she didn't have a computer. She began to learn Perl at age 12. Tang spent part of her childhood in Germany. Two years later, she dropped out of junior high school, unable to adapt to student life. Tang's head teacher encouraged her to go to university and later do research at Harvard, but Tang didn't see the point as she was already informally working with researchers from Harvard and Stanford. By the year 2000, at the age of 19, Tang had already held positions in software companies, and worked in California's Silicon Valley as an entrepreneur.

In late 2005, Tang began transitioning to female, including changing her English and Chinese names, citing a need to reconcile her outward appearance with her self-image. In 2017, Tang said, "I've been shutting reality off, and lived almost exclusively on the net for many years, because my brain knows for sure that I am a woman, but the social expectations demand otherwise." In 2019, Tang identified as "post-gender" or non-binary, responding to a request regarding pronoun preferences with "What's important here is not which pronouns you use, but the experience...about those pronouns... I'm not just non-binary. I'm really whatever, so do whatever."

The television news channel ETToday reported that Tang has an IQ of 180. Tang has been a vocal proponent for autodidacticism and anarchism.

== Free software contributions ==
Tang initiated and led the Pugs project, a joint effort from the Haskell and Perl programming language communities to implement the Perl 6 language; Tang also made contributions to internationalization and localization efforts for several free software projects, including SVK (a version-control software written in Perl for which Tang also wrote a large portion of the code), Request Tracker, and Slash, created Ethercalc, building on Dan Bricklin's work on WikiCalc and their work together on SocialCalc, as well as heading Traditional Chinese translation efforts for various open source-related books.

On CPAN, Tang initiated over 100 Perl projects between June 2001 and July 2006, including the popular Perl Archive Toolkit (PAR), a cross-platform packaging and deployment tool for Perl 5. Tang is also responsible for setting up smoke test and digital signature systems for CPAN. In October 2005, Tang was a speaker at O'Reilly Media's European Open Source Convention in Amsterdam.

== Career ==
Tang became involved in politics during Taiwan's 2014 Sunflower Student Movement demonstrations, in which Tang volunteered to help the protesters occupying the Taiwanese parliament building by broadcasting their message. The prime minister invited Tang to build media literacy curricula for Taiwan's schools, which was implemented in late 2017. Following this work, Tang was appointed minister without portfolio for digital affairs in the Lin Chuan cabinet in August 2016, and took office as the digital minister on October 1, being placed in charge of helping government agencies communicate policy goals and managing information published by the government, both via digital means. At age 35, Tang was the youngest minister without portfolio in Taiwanese history and was given this role to bridge the gap between the older and younger generations.

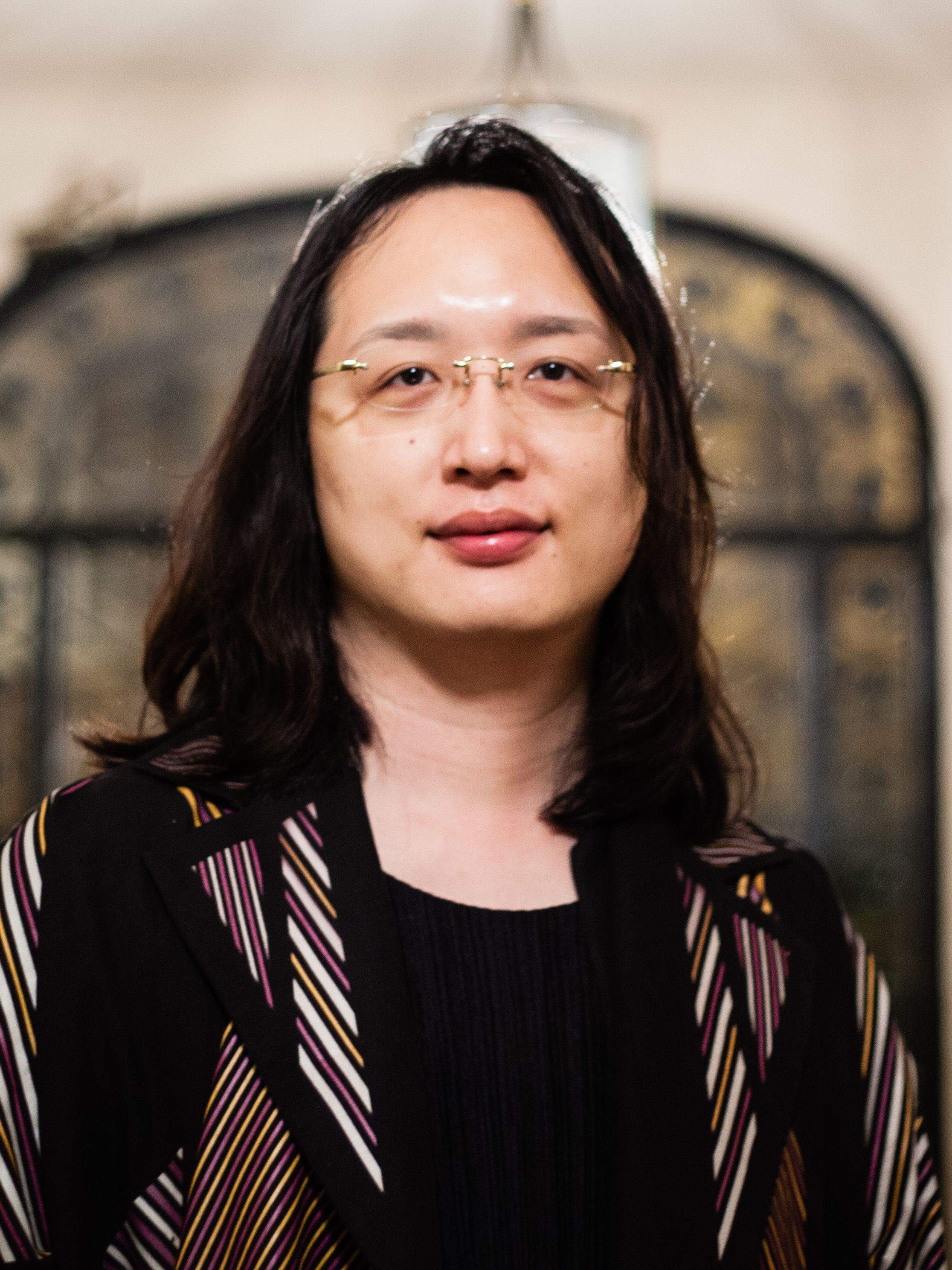
Official portrait, 2016

As a conservative anarchist, Tang ultimately desires the abolition of Taiwan and all states, and justifies working for the state by the opportunity it affords to promote worthwhile ends. Tang's conservatism stems from wanting to preserve free public spaces independent from the state, such as Internet properties, and wanting technological advances to be applied humanistically so that all can reap its benefits, rather than a few to the exclusion of others.

Tang's department does not follow hierarchical or bureaucratic relationships. As of 2017, Tang's staff of 15 chose to work in the department. The group produces a weekly roadmap as collaborators, not orders. Tang was quoted as saying, "My existence is not to become a minister for a certain group, nor to broadcast government propaganda. Instead, it is to become a 'channel' to allow greater combinations of intelligence and strength to come together." To help counter the COVID-19 pandemic in Taiwan, she used digital tools to call on the collective wisdom of its people based on three principles: "fast, fair, fun." She also created a strategy called "humour over rumour" which responded to misinformation within 20 minutes in 200 words or fewer, alongside two fun images. The implementation of her philosophies for open source into government resulted in a well-executed response to COVID-19, resisting both misinformation and the need for Taiwan to enter a full lockdown.

Tang joined the G0v movement shortly after its formation, and participated in the Sunflower Student Movement through that community. Another initiative, vTaiwan, uses social media paradigms for citizens to create digital petitions. Those with 5,000 signatures are brought to the premier and government ministries to be addressed. Changes implemented through this system include access to income tax software for non-Windows computers, and changes to cancer treatment regulations. The Taiwanese parliament complained that citizens had better access to influence regulation than they did as legislators. As of 2017, Tang was working on sharing economy software that would facilitate the free exchange of resources in abundance instead of the ride-sharing and peer hotel applications for which the technology is known.

As a general practice of radical transparency, all of Tang's ministerial meetings are recorded, transcribed, and uploaded to a public website. Tang also publicly responds to questions sent through another website.

In 2022, Tang hosted the video podcast "Innovative Minds with Audrey Tang" in a collaboration with TaiwanPlus, an international streaming service. Guests on the program include Steve Chen, Vitalik Buterin, Toomas Hendrik Ilves and Sandra Oudkirk.

In January 2023 Tang became an e-resident of Lithuania which was announced during her first foreign visit as Digital Affairs minister in Vilnius, Lithuania. Tang also became the chairperson of Taiwan's National Institute of Cyber Security board.

In May 2024, upon the inauguration of Lai Ching-te as the new president of Taiwan, Tang was replaced by Huang Yen-nun as minister for digital affairs.

In October 2024, Tang was named one of ten new ambassadors-at-large. In this function, she is currently serving on the Accelerator Fellowship Programme of the University of Oxford in the UK, "addressing digital democracy and the concept of Plurality in collaborative governance."

Audrey believes that bridging-based algorithms would make social media a force for amplifying common ground instead of division.

== Publications ==
- Rausch, Martin; Atlee, Tom; Jenna, Buechy (March 2026). Finding Light through the Cracks - Reinventing democracy with Audrey Tang. ISBN 978-3-9526513-6-0.
- ⿻ 數位 Plurality: The Future of Collaborative Technology and Democracy (Independently published, Apr 16, 2024, ISBN 979-8321247181), written with Glen Weyl and ⿻ Community
- Tang, Audrey (2019-10-15). "A Strong Democracy Is a Digital Democracy". The New York Times. New York, NY.
- Aker, Brian; Krieger, David; Wei-hung, Chen; Chih-jung, Chang; Chun-ying, Huang; Chih-pin, Lin; Ke-huan, Lin; Kang-min, Liu; Chung-han, Tang; Chien-ting, Weng (November 2003). 架設 Slash 社群網站 (Running Weblogs with Slash) (in Chinese). Taipei, Taiwan: O'Reilly Media. ISBN 978-986-7794-22-2. Archived from the original on 2016-09-11.

== Awards ==
- Right Livelihood Award (2025)

== See also ==
- Anarchism in Taiwan
- Civic technology
- Digital democracy in Taiwan
- E-democracy
- Open government
- Collective intelligence
