= Chu Tzer-ming =

Taiwanese financier and politician

- 朱澤民

2nd Minister of Budget, Accounting and Statistics
- In office 20 May 2016 – 20 May 2024
- Prime Minister: Lin Chuan; William Lai; Su Tseng-chang; Chen Chien-jen
- Preceded by: Shih Su-mei
- Succeeded by: Chen Shu-tzu

Personal details
- Party: Independent
- Education: National Chengchi University (BA, MA)

Chu Tzer-ming (Chinese: 朱澤民; pinyin: Zhū Zémín) is a Taiwanese financier and politician. He has been the Minister of the Directorate-General of Budget, Accounting and Statistics in the Executive Yuan since 20 May 2016.

== Education ==
Chu obtained his bachelor's degree in finance and master's degree in public finance from National Chengchi University (NCCU) in 1973 and 1977, respectively.

== Career ==
Chu was a lecturer at NCCU from 1977 to 1984, associate professor at NCCU from 1984 to 1995, associate professor at National Taipei University of Business from 2001 to 2005 and associate professor at Jinwen University of Science and Technology from 1999 to 2015. He became Minister of the ROC Directorate-General of Budget, Accounting and Statistics on 20 May 2016.
