= Fair Trade Commission (Taiwan) =

Taiwan government agency

- 公平交易委員會; Gōngpíngjiāoyì Wěiyuánhuì (Mandarin); Kûng-phìn Kâu-yi Vî-yèn-fi (Hakka)
- Logo

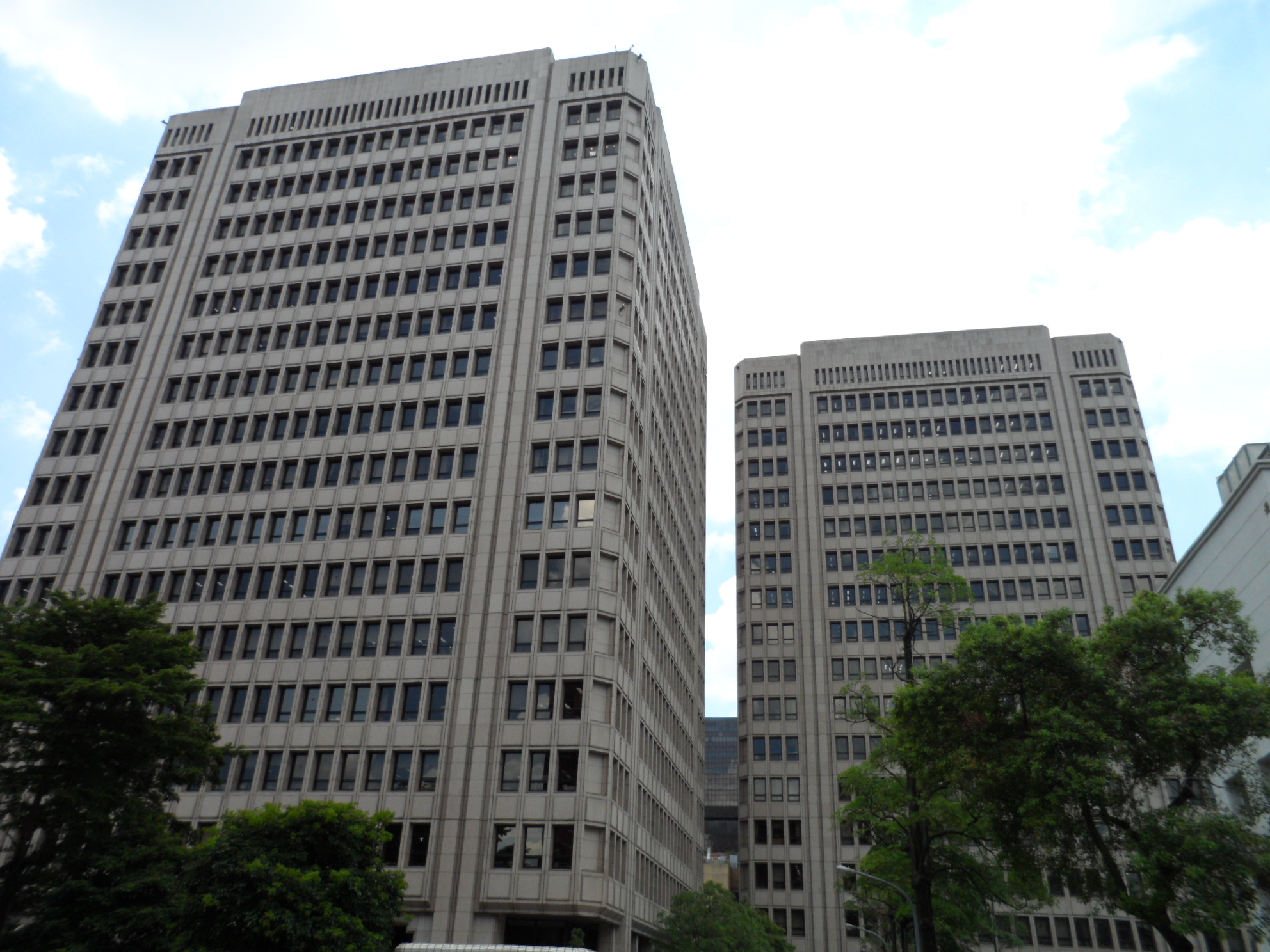

Agency overview
- Formed: 27 January 1992
- Jurisdiction: Taiwan (Republic of China)
- Headquarters: Zhongzheng, Taipei
- Agency executives: Lee May (李鎂), Chairperson; Chen Chih-min (陳志民), Vice Chairperson
- Parent agency: Executive Yuan
- Website: www.ftc.gov.tw

The Fair Trade Commission (FTC; Chinese: 公平交易委員會; pinyin: Gōngpíngjiāoyì Wěiyuánhuì; Pe̍h-ōe-jī: Kong-pêng Kau-e̍k Úi-oân-hōe) is an independent government agency subordinate to the Executive Yuan which is responsible for competition policy, trade practices, formulating fair trade policy, laws, regulations, investigating activities restricting competition, such as monopolies, mergers, collusions, cartels, and other unfair trade practices on the part of enterprises in the Republic of China (Taiwan).

The FTC is different from other foreign government regulators in that the Consumer Protection functions is administered by the Consumer Protection Committee.

== History ==
The Fair Trade Commission was created in 1992 to regulate competition and enforced trade practices. It has the powers to investigate illegal activities such as predatory pricing, collusion, cartels, mergers and other unfair trade practices that hurt choices, prices, create monopolies and reduce competition.

== Structure ==
- First Department
- Second Department
- Third Department
- Department of Planning
- Department of Legal Affairs
- Secretariat
- Personnel Office
- Accounting Office
- Statistical Office
- Civil Service Ethics Office

== Chairpersons ==
- Wang Chih-kang (27 January 1992 – 9 June 1996)
- Chao Yang-ching (10 June 1996 – 26 January 2001; acting until 26 January 1998)
- Hwang Tzong-leh (27 January 2001 – 26 January 2007)
- Yu Chao-chuan (27 January 2007 – 31 January 2007)
- Tang Jinn-chuan (1 February 2007 – 31 July 2009)
- Wu Shiow-ming (1 August 2009 – 31 January 2017; acting until 31 January 2010)
- Huang Mei-ying (1 February 2017 – 30 January 2023)
- Lee May (李鎂) (since 31 January 2023)

== Transportation ==
The building is accessible within walking distance South West from Shandao Temple Station of the Taipei Metro.

== See also ==
- Executive Yuan
- Competition regulator
