= Directorate General of Budget, Accounting and Statistics =

Government agency of Taiwan

- 主計總處; Zhǔjì Zǒngchù (Mandarin); Chú-kie Chúng-chhú (Hakka); Chú-kè Chóng-chhù (Taiwan Taigi)
- Logo

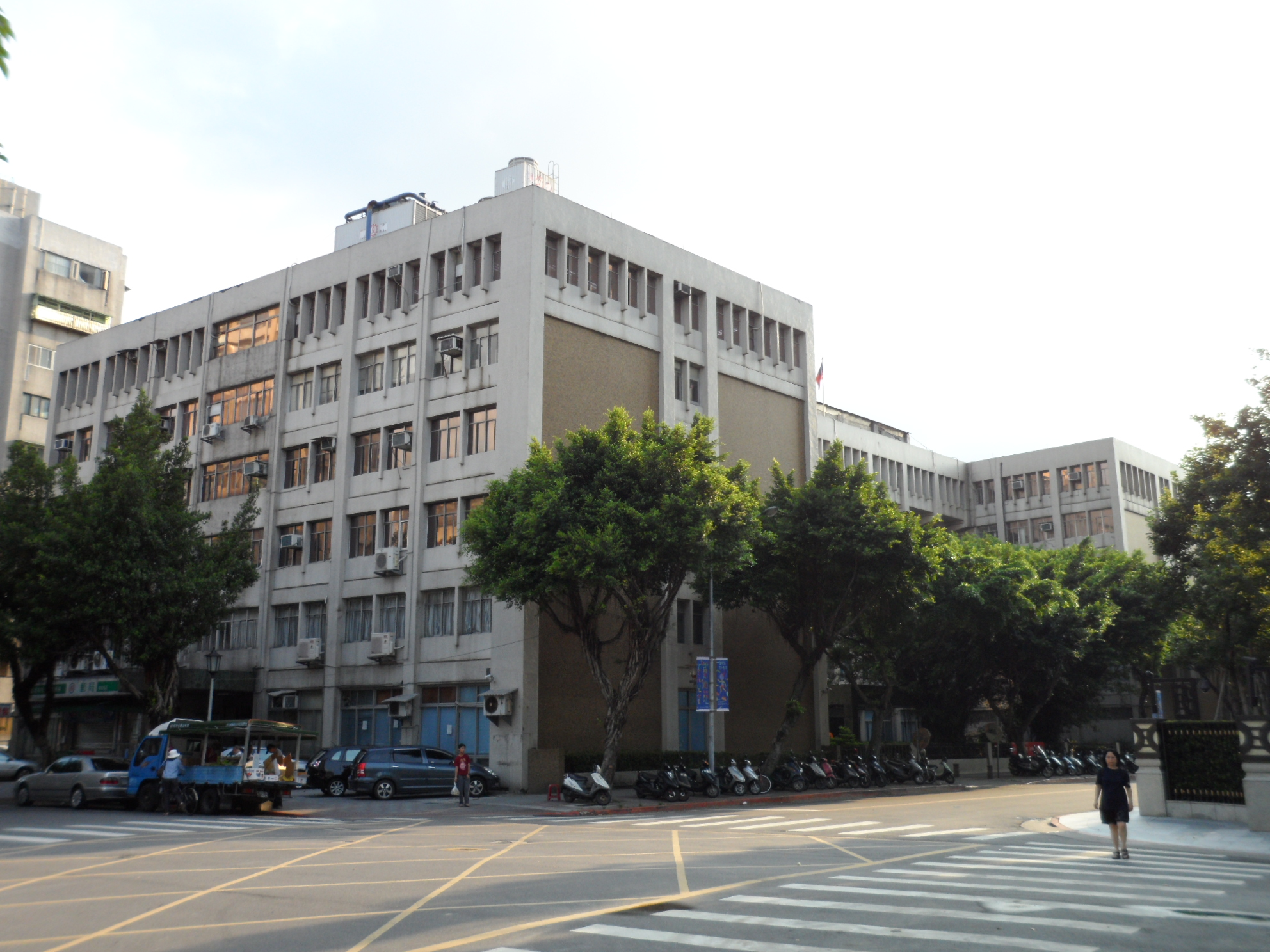

Agency overview
- Formed: April 1931
- Jurisdiction: Republic of China (Taiwan)
- Headquarters: Zhongzheng, Taipei
- Employees: 383
- Minister responsible: Chen Shu-tzu, Minister
- Parent agency: Executive Yuan
- Website: www.dgbas.gov.tw

The Directorate General of Budget, Accounting and Statistics (DGBAS; Chinese: 行政院主計總處; pinyin: Xíngzhèngyuàn Zhǔjì Zǒngchù; Pe̍h-ōe-jī: Hêng-chèng-īⁿ Chú-kè Chóng-chhù) is a branch of the Executive Yuan of the Republic of China (Taiwan), performs the role of both a comptroller for the government and census bureau.

== History ==
The DGBAS was established in April 1931 under the Nationalist Government. In May 1948, DGBAS was elevated to the Ministry of Budget, Accounting and Statistics and was placed under the Executive Yuan. In November 1973, the Organization Act of DGBAS was revised and came into force. It was again revised in May 1983. In line with Executive Yuan restructuring policy, DBGAS was reorganized in February 2012. The functions of its departments were reviewed and the Electronic Data Processing Center was merged into DGBAS.

== Organizational structure ==
- The Board of Comptrollers
- Department of Planning
- Department of General Fund Budget
- Department of Special Fund Budget
- Department of Accounting and Financial Reporting
- Department of Statistics
- Department of Census
- Department of Information Management
- Secretariat
- Department of Personnel
- Civil Service Ethics Office
- BAS Office
- BAS Training Center
- Laws and Regulations Committee
- National Income Statistics Review Committee

== List of leaders ==
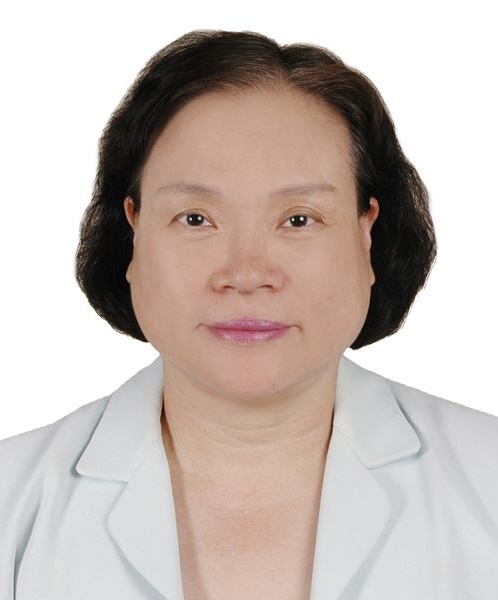
Chen Shu-tzu, the incumbent Minister of Directorate General of Budget, Accounting and Statistics

- Chen Qicai (April 1931 – October 1946)
- Xu Kan (October 1946 – November 1948)
- Pang Songzhou (龐松舟) (November 1948 – December 1949)
- Wang Yao (王燿) (December 1949 – March 1950)
- Chen Liang (陳良) (March 1950 – August 1950)
- Pang Songzhou (龐松舟) (August 1950 – July 1958)
- Chen Ching-yu (陳慶瑜) (July 1958 – March 1963)
- Chang Daoming (張導民) (March 1963 – January 1969)
- Zhou Hongtao (January 1969 – June 1978)
- Ching Shih-yi (鍾時益) (June 1978 – 11 January 1987)
- Yu Chien-ming (于建民) (12 January 1987 – 26 February 1993)
- Wang Kun (汪錕) (27 February 1993 – 9 June 1996)
- Wei Duan (10 June 1996 – 19 May 2000)
- Lin Chuan (20 May 2000 – 1 December 2002)
- Liu San-chi (劉三錡) (2 December 2002 – 19 May 2004)
- Hsu Jan-yau (20 May 2004 – 19 May 2008)
- Shih Su-mei (20 May 2008 – 19 May 2016)
- Chu Tzer-ming (20 May 2016 – 20 May 2024)
- Chen Shu-tzu (陳淑姿) (20 May 2024 –)

== Transportation ==
The building is accessible within walking distance South from Xiaonanmen Station of the Taipei Metro.

== See also ==
- Executive Yuan
