= Cynthia Wu =

Taiwanese business executive and politician

Cynthia Wu MLY
- 吳欣盈
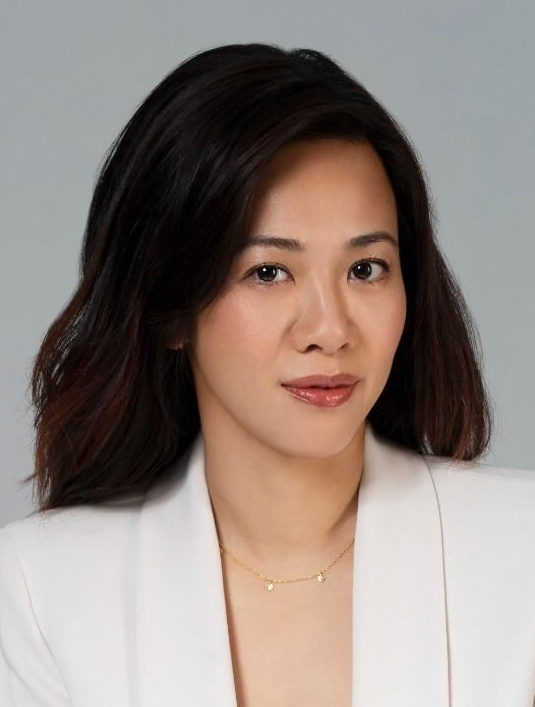
- Official portrait, 2022

Member of the Legislative Yuan
- In office 2 November 2022 – 31 January 2024
- Preceded by: Tsai Pi-ru
- Constituency: Party-list

Personal details
- Born: 18 May 1978 (age 48) United States
- Citizenship: Republic of China; United States (1978–2014)
- Party: Taiwan People's Party
- Spouse(s): Tommy Lin (m. 2010; div. 2019) Renaud van der Elst (m. 2022)
- Children: 1
- Relatives: Eugene Wu (father); Hsu Sheng-fa (grandfather); Thomas Wu, Eric Wu, Hsu Yang-ming (uncles); Kuan Bi-ling (aunt)
- Education: Wellesley College (BA); Courtauld Institute of Art (MA)

Cynthia Wu (Chinese: 吳欣盈; pinyin: Wú Xīnyíng; Wade–Giles: Wu Hsin-ying; born 18 May 1978) is a Taiwanese businesswoman, politician, and former financial analyst.

After attending college in the United States, Wu worked for subsidiaries of Merrill Lynch in the United Kingdom and the Shin Kong Group in Taiwan. She became a member of the Legislative Yuan in 2022 and was Ko Wen-je's running mate as the vice presidential nominee of the Taiwan People's Party in the 2024 Taiwanese presidential election.

== Early life and education ==
Cynthia Wu was born in the United States on 18 May 1978, the eldest daughter of Taiwanese businessman Eugene Wu and his wife, Hsu Hsien-hsien. Her maternal grandfather, Hsu Sheng-fa, was a prominent banker and politician. Her uncles Eric Wu and Thomas Wu are also business executives, with the former having previously served in the Legislative Yuan. She has a younger sister, Wu Hsin-ju, and a younger brother, Wu Yi-tung.

After graduating from the Taipei American School in 2006, Wu attended Wellesley College, where she graduated with a Bachelor of Arts with in international relations and art history in 2010. She then earned a Master of Arts from the Courtauld Institute of Art in England.

== Career ==
While living in the United Kingdom, Wu worked for Merrill Lynch in London. While residing in the United Kingdom, Cynthia Wu was an assistant to Conservative Party politician Peter Lilley. She held dual United States and Taiwanese citizenships, but relinquished her United States citizenship in 2014.

After returning to Taiwan, Wu was an executive at Shin Kong Life Insurance, a division of the Shin Kong Group, which was founded by her paternal grandfather Wu Ho-su.

Wu was ranked seventh on the Taiwan People's Party list prior to the 2020 Taiwanese legislative election. After the resignation of Tsai Pi-ru, Wu was appointed to the 10th Legislative Yuan on 2 November 2022.

On 24 November 2023, Taiwan People's Party chairman Ko Wen-je named Wu as his running mate for the 2024 presidential election. Despite controversy regarding her citizenship, on 4 December, all presidential and vice-presidential candidates were found and declared eligible to run for election, including Cynthia Wu.

== Personal life ==
Cynthia Wu married Tommy Lin, an executive at Hua Nan Securities and a descendant of Lin Ben Yuan Family, in 2010. In September 2013, Wu noticed that Lin, who suspected her of infidelity, had installed a GPS tracking unit in her car, and subsequently filed for divorce. Lin was acquitted in the first ruling, and the divorce was not granted. Although a second ruling in 2019 granted the divorce, Wu stated that the decision would deny her the experience of motherhood, as embryos that had been artificially inseminated during her marriage to Lin would be destroyed.

Wu married Renaud van der Elst, a Belgian baron, in 2022, Their son was born on 9 February 2023.
