= Taishin =

Taishin may refer to:

- Taishin Financial Holdings, a Taiwanese financial services company
- Taishin International Bank, a Taiwanese bank
- Taishin (given name), a masculine Japanese given name
- Taishin, Fukushima, a former village in Nishishirakawa District, Fukushima Prefecture, Japan
