= Eugene Wu (Taiwanese businessman) =

Taiwanese businessman (born 1945)

- Born: 1945 (age 80–81)
- Education: Waseda University (BEc)
- Spouse: Hsu Hsien-hsien
- Children: Cynthia and 2 others
- Parent(s): Wu Ho-su; Wu Kuei-lan

Eugene Wu (Chinese: 吳東進; pinyin: Wú Dōngjìn; born 1945) is a Taiwanese businessman. He led the Shin Kong Group and several affiliated subsidiaries. As of November 2025, Forbes estimated his net worth at $1.6 billion.

== Early life ==
Eugene Wu was born one of six children to Wu Ho-su and Wu Kuei-lan, and is the eldest of his brothers, which include Eric and Thomas, as well as Wu Tung-hsien. Eugene's eldest sister is Wu Ju-yueh.

Wu earned a bachelor's degree from Waseda University.

== Career ==
After his father's death in 1986, Eugene Wu assumed control of several of his father's holdings. Eugene partnered with construction magnate James Lin to build many buildings owned by the Shin Kong Group. In June 2002, Thomas Wu proposed a merger between his Taishin Financial Holdings and Eugene's Shin Kong Financial Holding. After eight days of formal consideration, Thomas withdrew the offer. In August 2005, Eugene was indicted by the Taipei District Prosecutors' Office on charges of insider trading, a violation of the Securities and Exchange Law related to the failed merger of 2002. That October, Shin Kong Financial completed a merger with Macoto Bank to form Shin Kong Bank. That same year, Wu was targeted by the Financial Holding Company Act announced by the Financial Supervisory Commission, which made it illegal for top executives at financial holding companies to hold equivalent leadership positions at other non-financial businesses. In 2006, Wu expressed an interest in forming a partnership with a financial institution that had international reach. Later that year, Wu's Shin Kong Financial Holding increased its investment in Shin Kong Bank. Wu also considered acquiring First Financial Holding. In his later career, Eugene Wu focused on the acquisition and sale of real estate on behalf of Shin Kong Life Insurance. Notable investments include office space in the Neihu Science Park and in London. As Shin Kong Life fell into debt, Shing Kong Group has sold buildings within the Shin Kong Mitsukoshi joint venture, home to the Shin Kong Mitsukoshi Department Store in Taiwan. Eugene Wu announced in June 2020 that he was stepping down from his position as chair of Shin Kong Financial. Wu was suspended from his post as chairman of Shin Kong Life Insurance on 15 September 2020, by the Financial Supervisory Commission. The company was fined for a reckless investment, and Wu was suspended for poor supervision. Wu was barred from rejoining the company board until his term ended in June 2023.

== Personal life ==
Wu has spoken favorably regarding the economic influence of China on Taiwan. He attended an annual forum organized by China's Taiwan Affairs Office in 2004. Wu has served the Formosa Foundation as a board member and the General Association of Chinese Culture as an executive member.

Fortune valued Wu's net worth at $1.8 billion in 1992. Wu was ranked on Forbes list of Taiwanese billionaires in 2006, with a net worth of $1.9 billion. By 2008, his net worth had risen to $2.3 billion, ranked 11th. Forbes reported that Wu lost $1 billion of his net worth in the 2009 rankings, placing 12th in Taiwan. In 2010, Wu's fortune was valued at $1.5 billion, and ranked 14th. The next year, according to Forbes, Wu's net worth had recovered to a total of $2.2 billion, and he was listed 13th on the list of Taiwanese billionaires. The 2017 Forbes rankings slid Wu to forty-first, with his fortune valued at $1.1 billion. The 2020 list ranked Wu the 37th richest Taiwanese billionaire, and valued his net worth at $1.2 billion.

Wu is married to Hsu Hsien-hsien, the daughter of banker and politician Hsu Sheng-fa. Wu and his wife raised three children. His eldest daughter, Cynthia Wu, married Tommy Lin, an executive at Hua Nan Securities, in 2010. His middle child is Wu Hsin-ju. Wu's youngest child and only son is Wu Yi-tung.

Wu acquired the gorilla later named Bao Bao after he was smuggled to Taiwan in 1987, and donated the primate to the Taipei Zoo.
