= List of P. League+ mascots =

The following is a list of mascots of the teams in P. League+ (PLG). Tainan TSG GhostHawks and Taoyuan Pauian Pilots are teams currently without mascots.

== Current mascots ==
Team	Mascot(s)	Tenures	Photo	Ref.
Kaohsiung 17LIVE Steelers	Iron	2021–present		
Tainan TSG GhostHawks	none			
Taipei Fubon Braves	Bill	2020–present		
Taoyuan Pauian Pilots	none			

== Former mascots ==
Team	Mascot(s)	Tenures	Photo	Ref.
Formosa Dreamers	Richart (Note: Mascot of Taishin Bank.)	2020–2023		
Formosa Dreamers	Unicorn	2020–2024		
Hsinchu Toplus Lioneers	Ready	2021–2024		
Hsinchu Toplus Lioneers	Uncle	2021–2024		
