= 2025 Taichung Shin Kong Mitsukoshi gas explosion =

Incident at a department store in Taiwan

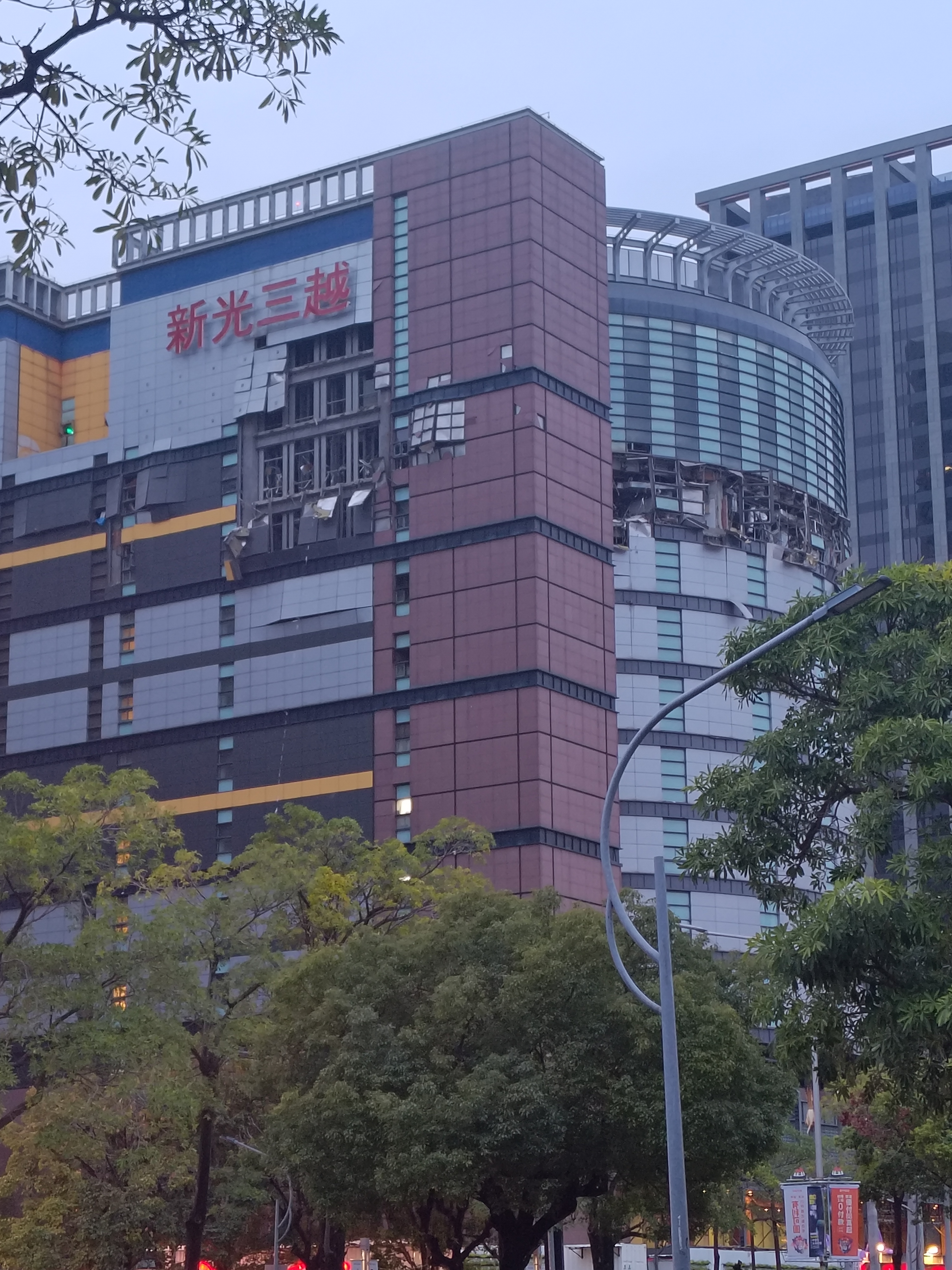
- Shin Kong Mitsukoshi after the explosion
- Native name: 台中新光三越氣爆
- Date: 13 February 2025
- Time: 11:33 a.m. (TST)
- Location: Xitun District, Taichung, Taiwan; 24°09′55″N 120°38′37″E
- Deaths: 5
- Injuries: 38

On 13 February 2025, a gas explosion occurred at the Shin Kong Mitsukoshi department store in the Xitun District of Taichung, Taiwan. Five people were killed, including three tourists from Macau who were struck by debris, and 38 were injured, making it the deadliest incident in the history of Taiwanese department stores.

== Explosion ==
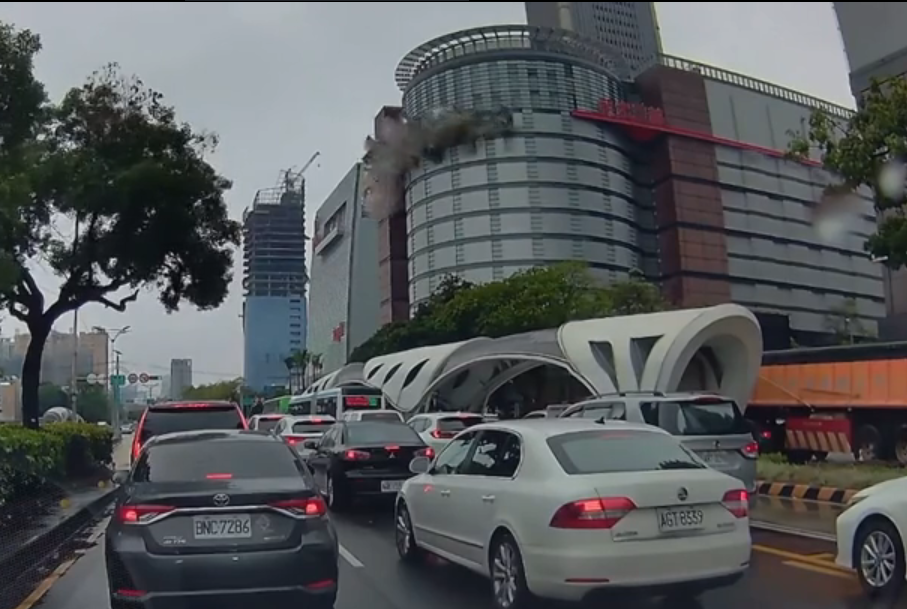
A photo of the explosion

At 11:33 (Taiwan Time) on 13 February 2025, the Taichung Fire Bureau was notified of a suspected gas explosion at the Shin Kong Mitsukoshi in the Xitun District portion of Taichung's 7th Redevelopment Zone. The explosion was traced to a food court on the 12th floor of the building, which was closed for construction at the time. The explosion occurred while counters were being dismantled, and the blast blew debris from the upper floors into the street.

By 19:20 that evening, all search and rescue missions had ended with the evacuation of all people in the building.

== Casualties ==
Initial reports by the government suggested six were killed in the blast, which was later revised to four by the fire agency. A family of seven from Macau, who were on a vacation, was walking past the department store on the sidewalk at the time of explosion. The grandparents of the two-year-old were killed by falling debris while the girl was seriously injured. Two of the victims, a department store staff member and a construction worker, died inside the building's 11th and 12th floors.

In the aftermath of the explosion, 39 people were injured; 34 Taiwanese and the other five members of the Macanese family. Five of the victims were described as being in serious condition. The explosion is the deadliest incident in the history of Taiwanese department stores.

The injured sought treatment at hospitals around Taiwan, including China Medical University Hospital, Taichung Veterans General Hospital, Lin Shin Hospital, the Chung Kang branch of the Cheng Ching Hospital (all in Taichung), as well as the Chang Gung Memorial Hospital in Taoyuan and Kaohsiung, and Mackay Memorial Hospital in Taipei. The two-year-old victim, who went into a coma, was discharged from China Medical University Hospital on 26 February. Macau's Health Bureau later announced that the child had died at the Conde S. Januário Hospital on 7 March 2025.

== Investigation ==
The National Fire Agency linked the incident to ongoing renovations or a gas leak in the building. The Shin Chung Natural Gas Company said the gas was disconnected at the time, but constructors there said they smelled gas while working. The Taichung City Government ordered store operations to be suspended indefinitely until the results of further investigations were revealed. The Urban Development Bureau of the Taichung City Government said it did not receive renovation applications at the time and was considering the imposition of penalties. Taichung Fire Bureau Chief Sun Fu-you said that fines of up to NT$1.2 million could be imposed on the department store for violations of the Fire Services Act, failure to apply for a work permit in violation of the Building Act and violations of the Occupational Safety and Health Act.

The Taichung District Prosecutors Office questioned 50 people in the aftermath of the explosion, including construction workers and staff of Shin Kong Mitsukoshi and Shin Chung Natural Gas Company personnel. Investigators later found that firefighting equipment, including gas leak detectors, had been turned off on the 12th floor at the time of the explosion.

The Taichung Fire Bureau confirmed the cause of the explosion on 28 March 2025. Other than listing some items as key evidence, additional details of their report were not publicized. The Taichung Fire Bureau instead turned the report in to prosecutors for further investigation and legal action.

Prosecutorial investigations established that contractors had been allowed to start renovations without interior renovation permits or approval of a fire safety plan for the construction period. Furthermore, department store management had not properly confirmed that gas-related hazards had been handled. Shin Chung Natural Gas Company removed some gas meters and sealed some pipes. However, the gas leak detection system had been removed as well, and not replaced. An excavator then tore through pipes in the ceiling, allowing gas buildup. The investigation found that the explosion occurred after an electrician, who had not been informed of the leak, began using a powered cable cutter.

In December 2025, thirteen people were indicted for their roles in the explosion, leading to negligent homicide, negligent injury and violations of the Occupational Safety and Health Act.

== Reactions ==
Two off-duty nurses affiliated with Changhua Christian Hospital provided medical assistance to the injured until additional medical professionals arrived. Changhua Christian Hospital awarded the nurses NT$100,000 for their efforts.

Shortly after the explosion, the Mainland Affairs Council promised to report the incident to the Macau Government, and the Macau Government Tourism Office confirmed that at least three casualties were Macanese visitors to Taiwan.

Shin Kong Group president Richard Wu said they would take responsibility for the incident, as the Shin Kong Mitsukoshi "takes an important role of shopping in our society", and also offered NT$1 million in compensation to families of the deceased. SKM later increased the compensation offered to NT$11 million.

Taipei Mayor Chiang Wan-an canceled a planned appearance later in the day of the explosion and offered his city's assistance. Kaohsiung city officials also offered Taichung assistance.

On 15 February, President Lai Ching-te met with the injured people being treated at Lin Shin Hospital and Taichung Veterans General Hospital. Lai also prefaced a speech delivered at a press conference the following day by expressing concern for those affected by the explosion.

Following renovations, the Shin Kong Mitsukoshi reopened on 27 September 2025. Upon reopening, the 12th floor food court housed 25 brands, and the 11th floor became focused on athletics, including 12 Olympic sports.

== See also ==
- 2014 Kaohsiung gas explosions
- Realty Building explosion
- List of explosions
