= Kuan Bi-ling =

Taiwanese political scientist, lawyer, and politician (born 1956)

Kuan Bi-ling MLY
- 管碧玲
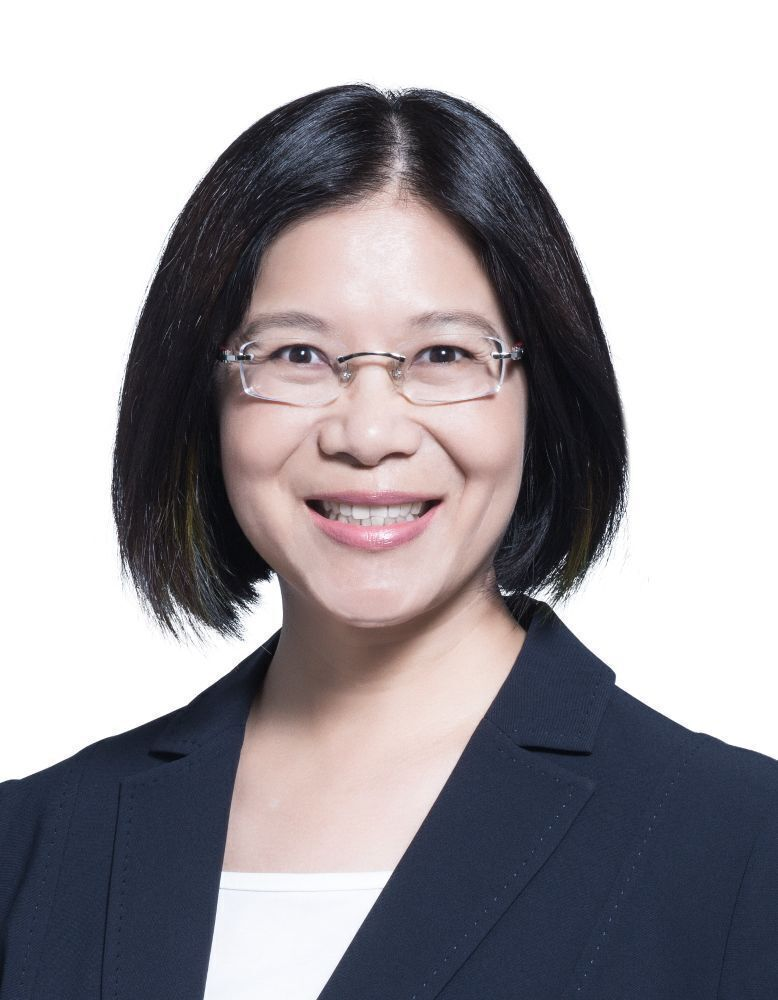
- Official portrait, 2023

3rd Minister of Ocean Affairs
- Incumbent
- Assumed office 31 January 2023
- Prime Minister: Chen Chien-jen; Cho Jung-tai
- Preceded by: Chou Mei-wu (a.i.); Lee Chung-wei

Member of the Legislative Yuan
- In office 1 February 2005 – 31 January 2023
- Succeeded by: Chen Pei-yu (Note: Chen was her successor for her seat in the Legislative Yuan for the National At-Large Constituency in 2023. Successors for her former constituencies are: Chung Shao-he for Kaohsiung 1, Lin Yi-shih for Kaohsiung 2, and Lee Kun-tse for Kaohsiung 5.)
- Constituency: See list: Kaohsiung 1 (2005-2008) Kaohsiung 2 (2008-2010) Kaohsiung 5 (2010-2020) DPP Party list №9 (2020-2023)
Local government positions
Director General of Bureau of Cultural Affairs
In office 1 January 2003 – 15 September 2004
Mayor	Frank Hsieh
Director General of the Information Bureau
In office 17 April 2000 – 31 December 2002
Mayor	Frank Hsieh

Personal details
- Born: 9 December 1956 (age 69) Fengyuan, Taichung County, Taiwan
- Party: Democratic Progressive Party
- Spouse: Hsu Yang-ming
- Children: 2
- Relatives: Cynthia Wu
- Education: National Chung Hsing University (LLB, LLM); National Taiwan University (PhD)
- Profession: Political scientist

Kuan Bi-ling (Chinese: 管碧玲; pinyin: Guǎn Bìlíng; born 9 December 1956) is a Taiwanese political scientist, lawyer, and politician who is a member of the Democratic Progressive Party. She currently serves as the minister of the Ocean Affairs Council.

== Early life and education ==
Kuan was born on 9 December 1956 in Taichung County, Taiwan. She was raised in Fengyuan to a middle-class family. Her father was of Hakka Chinese descent, while her mother was Hoklo Taiwanese. Her mother worked as a weaver.

After graduating from Fengyuan Elementary School in 1969, Kuan attended Fengyuan Junior High School. She graduated at the top of her junior high school class and gained admission to Taichung Girls' Senior High School. After high school, she graduated with a Bachelor of Laws with a specialization in public administration from National Chung Hsing University in 1979. She later earned a Master of Laws degree from the university.

In 1994, Kuan earned her Ph.D. in political science from National Taiwan University. Her doctoral dissertation was titled, Nationalism and Taiwan's Party Politics (民族主義與台灣政黨政治). She subsequently completed an executive education program in national and international security at the Harvard Kennedy School.

== Early career ==
- Director General, Kaohsiung City Bureau of Cultural Affairs
- Director General, Kaohsiung City Department of Information
- 8th and 10th DPP Central Party Headquarters Central Executive Committee
- Deputy Director, President Chen Shui-Bian Knowledge Taiwan Election Campaign Group
- Spokesperson, Women's Headquarters, Mayor Chen Shui-bian Re-Election Campaign
- Spokesperson, Alliance for Supervision of Constitutional Reform
- Secretary General, Taiwan Association of University Professor
- Associate Professor, Department of Public Administration and Policy, National Taipei University

== Political career ==
Before she served as minister, she previously served as a member of the Legislative Yuan from 2005 to 2023, winning three consecutive elections, including the highly competitive 2008 legislative election in Constituency 2 of Kaohsiung City, after the introduction of the single-member district system which halved the total seats from 225 to 113.

No.	Candidate	Party	Votes	Ratio	Elected
1	Lwo Shih-hsiung	Kuomintang	63,410	48.85%	
2	Lee Ching-yu	Home Party	424	0.33%	
3	Ceng Wun Sheng (曾文聖)	Taiwan Constitution Association	186	0.14%	
4	Lin Cheng Syong (林稱雄)	Independent	184	0.14%	
5	Kuan Bi-ling	Democratic Progressive Party	65,604	50.54%	

== Personal life ==
Kuan is married to Hsu Yang-ming. Through her marrige to Hsu, she is related to the Wu family in the Shin Kong Group. Including her former coworker in the Legislative Yuan and TPP vice presidential candidate in the 2024 Taiwanese presidential election, Cynthia Wu.

== Controversy ==
=== Physical confrontation in the Education and Culture Committee ===
On 22 October 2008, Legislator Hung Hsiu-chu of the Chinese Nationalist Party injured an eye of Kuan's parliamentary assistant (PA) while pushing a poster away during a budget review session of the National Science Council in the Education and Culture Committee, so Kuan stood up in argument with Hung till finally slapping Hung's face and Hung pinching Kuan's cheeks, and both legislators refused to apologize. Kuan states: "When one is faced with repression, one should stand straight, refuse to give in and fight against oppression and hegemony." Hung launched a lawsuit against Kuan for two years until a judge persuaded both sides to reconcile with each other, and shared chocolate together in peace on 29 July 2010.

=== Supporting the languages development act ===
The 2018 Development of National Languages Act stipulates the government offices to provide the interpretation services for the citizens participating in administrative, legislative, and judicial procedures to freely choose to use their national languages, so the Legislative Yuan activated the interpreter service for the parliament session in real time accordingly. On 27 September 2021, after following the steps to apply in advance with 3 Taiwanese interpreters been present ready, Legislator Chen Po-wei of the Taiwan Statebuilding Party proceeded his scheduled questioning session in Taiwanese in the Foreign and National Defense Committee. Minister of National Defense, Chiu Kuo-cheng rejected to speak Taiwanese, nor accepted the interpreter's real-time service at site, but brought the deputy minister Zong-hsiao Li as his own interpreter, and insisted in the 3-way translation pattern sentence by sentence. Chiu repeatedly interrupted the question process by asking Chen to speak Mandarin Chinese for easier communication, or the session time cannot be lengthened to accommodate the interpretation, but Li is not a linguistic professional, hence his translation contains contextual errors, so Chairman Chen I-hsin intervened when the argument occurred, and introduced the existing synchronized interpretation in progress as the solution same as the common conference practice in the other states; but Chiu never picked up the earphone, yet insisted his way till the session run out of time. Chen later apologized to the public for the good intention of practicing the national language law being turned into a linguistic communication tragedy, and condemned Chiu for "bullying" (鴨霸), but Chiu denied the allegation and claimed that a language is a tool of communication. The parliamentary interpretation service were temporarily suspended afterwards pending on better communication in the future - consequently Kuan, the other MPs and media editorials such as the Taipei Times commented that Language is not just a tool of communication as Chiu said, but also an identity of feelings and culture. Taipei City Councilor Miao Poya also explained that the multi-lingual working environment is essential for a healthy mind without the "Chinese Language Supremacy" (華語至上) attitude to achieve the international level in diversity, equality and mutual respect for a modern state.
