= KGI =

KGI is an acronym for:

- Keck Graduate Institute
- Kernel Graphics Interface
- Knight Global Investments
- KGI Bank

KGI may also refer to:

- Kalgoorlie-Boulder Airport, IATA airport code
