= Chen Gene-tzn =

Taiwanese lawyer and politician (born 1941)

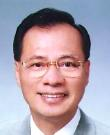
Official portrait (1993–1999)

Chen Gene-tzn or Johnson Chen (Chinese: 陳瓊讚; pinyin: Chén Qióngzàn; Pe̍h-ōe-jī: Tân Khêng-chàn; born 1 July 1941) is a Taiwanese lawyer and politician.

== Education and career ==
Chen studied law at National Taiwan University and practiced law for two decades, which encompassed tenures as a prosecutor before the district courts in Taipei and Kaohsiung. Aside from law, Chen taught at schools in Hualien was also active in Christian welfare and social services organizations. He later chaired the Taishin Investment Trust.

He served on the second convocation of the National Assembly before being elected to consecutive terms as a member of the Legislative Yuan in 1995 and 1998 on the Kuomintang proportional representation party list. While serving on the Legislative Yuan, he was also a member of the Kuomintang's standing committee and director of the party's organizational affairs department.
