= Eric Wu =

Taiwanese business executive and politician

Wu Tung-sheng
- 吳東昇
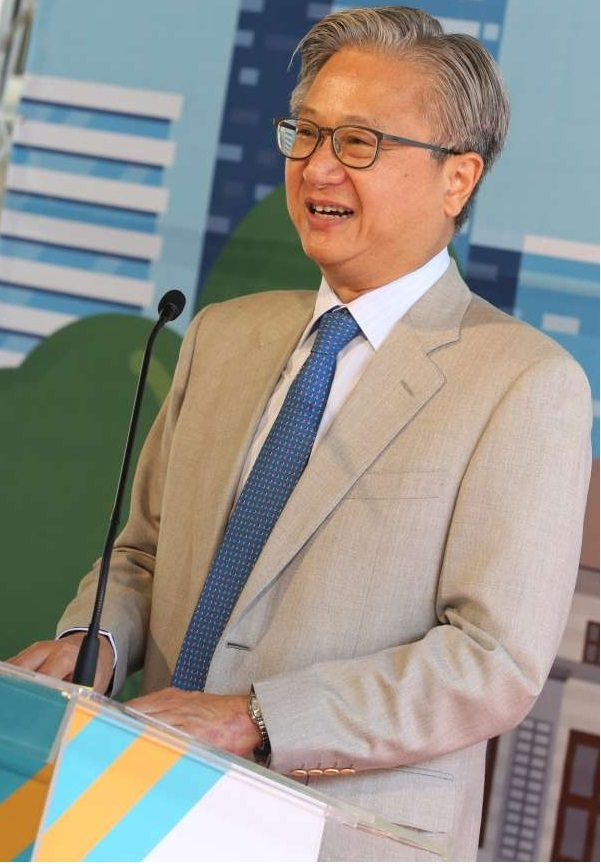
- Wu in 2018

Member of the Legislative Yuan
- In office 1 February 2002 – 31 January 2005
- Constituency: Republic of China
- In office 1 February 1993 – 31 January 1996
- Constituency: Hsinchu County

Member of the National Assembly
- In office 20 May 1996 – 19 May 2000

Personal details
- Born: 14 July 1953 (age 73) Taipei, Taiwan
- Party: Taiwan Solidarity Union (since 2001); Kuomintang (until 2001)
- Relations: Eugene Wu (brother); Thomas Wu (brother)
- Parents: Wu Ho-su (father); Wu Kuei-lan (mother)
- Education: National Taiwan University (LLB); Harvard University (LLM, MBA, JD, SJD)
- Profession: Lawyer; legal scholar

Wu Tung-sheng (Chinese: 吳東昇; pinyin: Wú dōngshēng; born 14 July 1953), also known by his English name Eric Wu, is a Taiwanese lawyer, legal scholar, business executive and politician.

== Early life and education ==
Wu was born in Taipei, Taiwan, to a prominent Hakka Chinese business family. His parents, Wu Ho-su and Liang Kuei-lan, were the founders of the Shin Kong Group. His elder brothers, Thomas and Eugene, are also businessmen. His sister Wu Ju-yueh is the eldest of his siblings.

After graduating from Taipei Municipal Chien Kuo High School, Wu attended law school at National Taiwan University and graduated with his Bachelor of Laws (LL.B.) in 1975. He then completed graduate studies in the United States at Harvard University, where he earned a Master of Business Administration (M.B.A.) from Harvard Business School in 1980, then earned a Master of Laws (LL.M.) in 1977, a Juris Doctor (J.D.), and his Doctor of Juridical Science (S.J.D.) in 1991, all from Harvard Law School.

At Harvard, Wu became law school classmates with sinologist William P. Alford, who later served as his doctoral advisor. His doctoral dissertation was titled, "The Taiwan Relations Act: Its content, ramifications and effect upon international law".

== Early career ==
Wu became a lawyer in New York before returning to Taiwan, where he taught at Soochow University and led the Taiwan Securities Company, a subsidiary of Taishin Financial Holdings, as chairman. Wu retained his business leadership positions while serving on the Legislative Yuan. In the mid-1990s, Eric Wu rented the residence of entrepreneur Chiang A-hsin, and established the Chin Kuang Fu Foundation in 1995 to maintain the property.

== Political career ==
Wu was elected to the second Legislative Yuan from Hsinchu County as a member of the Kuomintang, serving from 1993 to 1996. He subsequently sat on the third convocation of the National Assembly, between 1996 and 2000. Wu was expelled from the Kuomintang in October 2001, after accepting a legislative nomination from the Taiwan Solidarity Union earlier that year. He won election as a party list member of the Legislative Yuan in December 2001. A month into his second term as legislator, the TSU nominated Wu to join the ROC-US Parliamentary Amity Association. He participated in overseas trips to Russia and Japan to further Taiwan's bilateral foreign relations. As a legislator with extensive business experience, Wu frequently commented on trade, economics, and industry. In June 2002, Wu explained that he and the TSU were not opposed to the three links between Taiwan and China. Rather, the party simply sought the continued implementation of Chen Shui-bian's "no haste, be patient" policy. In July 2003, he warned against Chinese investment in Taiwan, stating that Cross-Strait capital should be monitored to prevent politically motivated economic manipulation. As the 2003 SARS outbreak hit Taiwan, Wu and fellow TSU members Liao Pen-yen, Lo Chih-ming, Huang Chung-yuan, and Huang Cheng-che formed a working group to confront the issue. Fredrick Chien consulted Wu, among several others, when asked to form a committee to probe the 3-19 shooting incident, which injured Chen Shui-bian and Annette Lu. In October 2004, Wu withdrew from consideration as a TSU candidate for the legislative elections planned in December, and consequently was not nominated for another term. Weeks before his second Legislative Yuan term ended, Wu considered attending the second inauguration of US President George W. Bush.

== Later business career ==
In August 2004, Thomas Wu was elected by the board of directors of Shinkong Synthetic Fibers Corporation to serve as company chairman. Their mother made it known that she preferred Eric take the position, and asked Thomas to step down. Eric and his mother contested Thomas's election, because members of the board were to be reselected prior to the vote that installed Thomas as chairman. As the chairmanship dispute unfolded, Eric and Thomas Wu were investigated by the Financial Supervisory Commission on suspicions of insider trading. In November 2004, the conflict was resolved. Thomas yielded the chairmanship of Shinkong Synthetic Fibers Corporation to Eric, and was named to the same position at Taishin Financial Holdings. In turn, Eric ceded his proxy votes on the Taishin Financial board to Thomas. The FSC ruled in December 2004 that there were no financial gains, and therefore no insider trading, but that Taiwan Securities Company had not sought final approval to trade shares in Shinkong Synthetic Fibers. As a result, Taiwan Securities Company was fined NT$2.5 million. Additionally, Taishin Financial divested from Taishin Investment Trust, the latter of which was chaired by Eric.

Eric Wu attempted to diversify his holdings in later years, exploring the potential acquisition of Taiwan Television Enterprise in December 2005, and bidding on Idee Department Store in November 2007. In September 2009, the Control Yuan voted to impeach prosecutor Lin Sheng-lin on charges of corruption. Lin had worked with Wu to establish a legal aid foundation, but was found to have extorted money, and divulged information pertinent to ongoing investigations.

Under Wu's leadership, Shinkong Synthetic Fibers pursued a 4G telecommunications license in 2013. This was followed in 2014 by an increased investment in a joint venture with Invista, as well as another investment valued at NT$3 billion, in TacBright Optronics Corp, a subsidiary of Shinkong Synthetic Fibers. In 2017, Wu planned to increase the production of engineering plastics made by Shinkong Synthetic Fibers.
