= Shin Kong Mitsukoshi =

Taiwanese department store chain owned by John Lewis Partnership

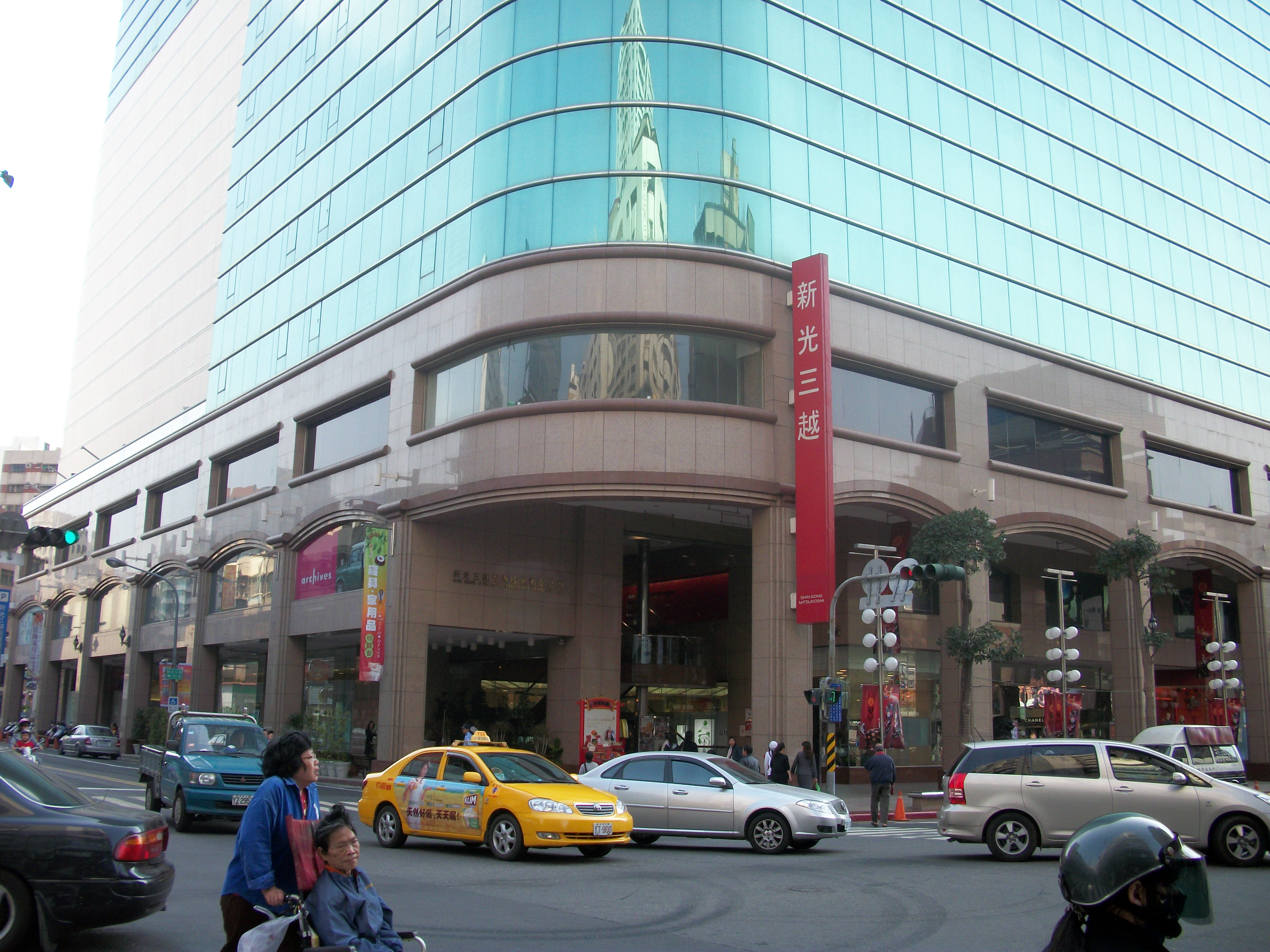
- Type: Subsidiary
- Industry: Retail
- Founded: 1972; 54 years ago
- Headquarters: Taiwan
- Number of locations: 19 stores
- Area served: Taiwan and China
- Key people: CEO: Eric Wu
- Total assets: NT$15,000,000,000
- Parent: Shin Kong Group
- Website: www.skm.com.tw

Shin Kong Mitsukoshi (SKM, Chinese: 新光三越百貨; pinyin: Xīnguāng Sānyuè Bǎihuò) is a Taiwanese brand of high-end department stores operating throughout Taiwan, with concessions also located in mainland China. The brand is a joint venture of the Taiwanese Shin Kong Group and Japanese Mitsukoshi.

Shin Kong Mitsukoshi's first store was opened in 1991 in Zhongshan District, Taipei and there are now 16 branches across Taiwan. The first Shin Kong Mitsukoshi concession in China opened in Beijing in April 2007.

== Current branches ==
=== Taiwan ===
All stores currently trade as 'Shin Kong Mitsukoshi' unless stated otherwise.

- Taipei Nanxi: 1 (opened 1991), 3 (opened 2008)
- Taipei Station (opened 1993)
- Taipei Tianmu (opened 2004)
- Taipei Xinyi Place: A4, A8, A9, A11 (opened 1997-2005)
- Diamond Towers (opened 2023)
- Taoyuan Station (opened 2008)
- Taichung Zhonggang (opened 2000)
- Chiayi Chuiyang (opened 2008)
- Tainan Zhongshan (opened 1996)
- Tainan Place: 1 (opened 2002), 2 (opened 2013)
- Kaohsiung Sanduo (opened 1993)
- Kaohsiung Zuoying 1, 2 (both opened 2010)
- SKM Park (opened 2022)

=== China ===
- Suzhou (opened 2015)
- Chongqing (opened 2017)

=== Defunct ===
- Taipei Nanxi 2 (opened 2008, closed 2018)
- Taoyuan Dayou (opened 1998, closed 2023)
- Hsinchu (opened 2000, closed 2018)
- Beijing (opened 2007, closed 2014)

== Incidents ==
On 13 February 2025, four people were killed and 30 injured at the Taichung branch of SKM after a natural gas explosion occurred on the 12th floor. Two people were killed directly by the explosion, while two tourists from Macau were killed by falling debris on the street. Taichung mayor Lu Shiow-yen ordered the branch to suspend operations pending a safety inspection. The store reopened on 27 September 2025 following renovations.
