= Thomas Wu =

Taiwanese businessman

- 吳東亮
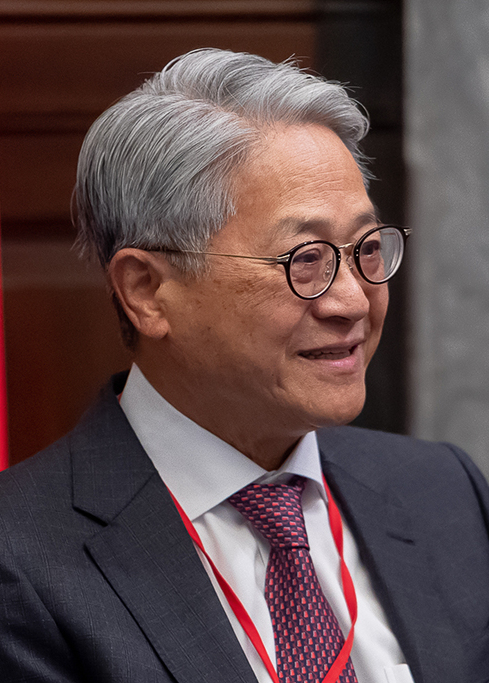
- Wu in 2021
- Born: 11 April 1950 (age 76); Taipei, Taiwan
- Education: Fu Jen Catholic University (BS); University of California, Los Angeles (MBA)
- Spouse: Sylvia Peng (彭雪芬)
- Children: 2
- Parents: Wu Ho-su (father); Wu Kuei-lan (mother)

Thomas Wu (Chinese: 吳東亮; pinyin: Wú Dōngliàng; born 11 April 1950) is a Taiwanese business executive. As of October 2025, Forbes estimated his net worth at US$2.4 billion.

== Early life and education ==
Wu was born on April 11, 1950, in Taipei. He is the fourth of six children born to entrepreneur Wu Ho-su and his wife, Wu Kuei-lan.

After attending Taipei Municipal Chien Kuo High School, Wu graduated from Fu Jen Catholic University with a bachelor's degree in chemistry in 1972. He then studied business in the United States at the University of California, Los Angeles, where he earned a Master of Business Administration (M.B.A.) from the Anderson School of Management in 1975.

== Business career ==
Wu founded Taishin International Bank via merger in 1992, divesting from his father's textiles company to do so. In February 2002, Wu's Taishin Financial Holdings began business operations. Months after its establishment, Taishin Financial announced a planned merger with Taiwan Securities Company and Taishin Bills Finance Corporation. Later that year, Taishin Financial broke ground on a new office building, the Taishin Tower. Wu also explored merging with Shin Kong Financial Holding, held by his brother Eugene. Plans for the merger were called off after days of consideration. In 2003, Taishin Bank launched the Visa Infinite card throughout Asia. The next year, Wu considered a merger with First Financial Holding. In March 2004, Wu stated that Taishin Financial had partnered with Test Rite International to securitize Time Plaza, and that the site was the first property-backed securitization project targeting pre-sold housing units.

In August 2004, Thomas Wu terminated several Taishin Financial board members close to his brother Eric. Later that month, the board of directors of Shinkong Synthetic Fibers Corporation elected Thomas to serve as company chairman. Their mother made it known that she preferred Eric take the position, and asked Thomas to step down. Eric and his mother contested Thomas's election, because members of the board were to be reselected prior to the vote that installed Thomas as chairman. As the business chairmanship dispute continued, Thomas and Eric were suspected of insider trading and investigated by the Financial Supervisory Commission. In November 2004, the conflict was resolved. Thomas yielded the chairmanship of Shinkong Synthetic Fibers Corporation to Eric, and was named to the same position at Taishin Financial Holdings. In turn, Eric ceded his proxy votes on the Taishin Financial board to Thomas, and secured Taishin Investment Trust Company's independence from Taishin Financial. The FSC ruled in December 2004 that there were no financial gains, and therefore no insider trading, but that Taiwan Securities Company had not sought final approval to trade shares in Shinkong Synthetic Fibers. As a result, Taiwan Securities Company was fined NT$2.5 million. With the leadership dispute resolved, Taishin Financial share price rose to NT$29.40 in early December 2004.

Thomas Wu expressed support for the Financial Supervisory Commission as the agency announced criteria for the merger of financial holding companies in December 2004. The next year, Wu began considering plans for merger and acquisition. Wu stated in March 2005 that Bank SinoPac had elected to considered a merger with the International Bank of Taipei instead of Taishin Financial. SinoPac chairman Richard Hong said, "The talks with Taishin did not collapse," and that a final decision would be made in May. Taishin charged two SinoPac employees with libel in May, for distributing an email to SinoPac shareholders including incorrect information regarding Taishin. After SinoPac apologized for the miscommunication, the charges were withdrawn. After the merger with SinoPac fell through, Taishin Financial bid NT$36.6 billion for a controlling stake in Chang Hwa Commercial Bank. In December 2005, Taishin Financial sought to acquire a larger share of Chang Hwa. By October 2006, the financial institutions were proposing a share swap. Taishin Financial and Aegon N.V. formed a joint venture in insurance in June 2007. The deal also included a 2.5% stake of Chang Hwa changing hands. Wu announced in July that the merger between Chang Hwa and Taishin Financial would be complete by the end of the year. However, the Executive Yuan stalled the merger, necessitating the sale of Taishin Securities Company to the Koos Group. A Taishin Financial shareholders' meeting in June 2013 saw the passage of a resolution permitting Wu to pursue legal action to merge Taishin International Bank and Chang Hwa Bank. Days later, Chang Hwa executives also formally backed the merger.

== Personal life ==
In 1990, Wu was kidnapped by Hu Gwan-bao. Wu was freed on 18 December 1990 upon payment of a NT$100 million ransom, delivered directly to Wu's captor by Wu's wife. Hu was arrested days later by Hou You-yi, and executed in 1991.

Wu is married to Sylvia Peng. Peng retired from acting in 1984, aged 24, to marry him. The couple raised two sons, Wu Hsin-wei, known as Peter, and Wu Hsin-hao. Wu Shu-jen disclosed in February 2009 that she had received a sum of money from Thomas Wu. Thomas Wu was questioned by the Supreme Prosecutors Office a year later, as part of ongoing investigation into corruption charges against Chen Shui-bian, Wu Shu-jen's husband. Wu made his first appearance on The World's Billionaires in March 2015.
