= PCF Architects =

Architectural firm based in New York City

- Industry: Architecture
- Founded: 1955, New York, NY, United States
- Founder: I. M. Pei FAIA, RIBA (1917–2019); Henry N. Cobb FAIA (1926–2020); Eason Leonard FAIA, RIBA (1920–2003)
- Headquarters: 88 Pine Street; Manhattan, NY, United States
- Area served: International
- Key people: Michael W. Bischoff AIA, LEED; José Bruguera AIA; Katherine Bojsza AIA, WELL, LEED; Christopher Jend AIA; Min Lee AIA, WELL AP, LEED AP BD+C; Hitoshi Maehara AIA; Matteo Milani PhD, AIA
- Services: Architecture, Sustainable Design, Interior Design, Urban Design, Planning
- Website

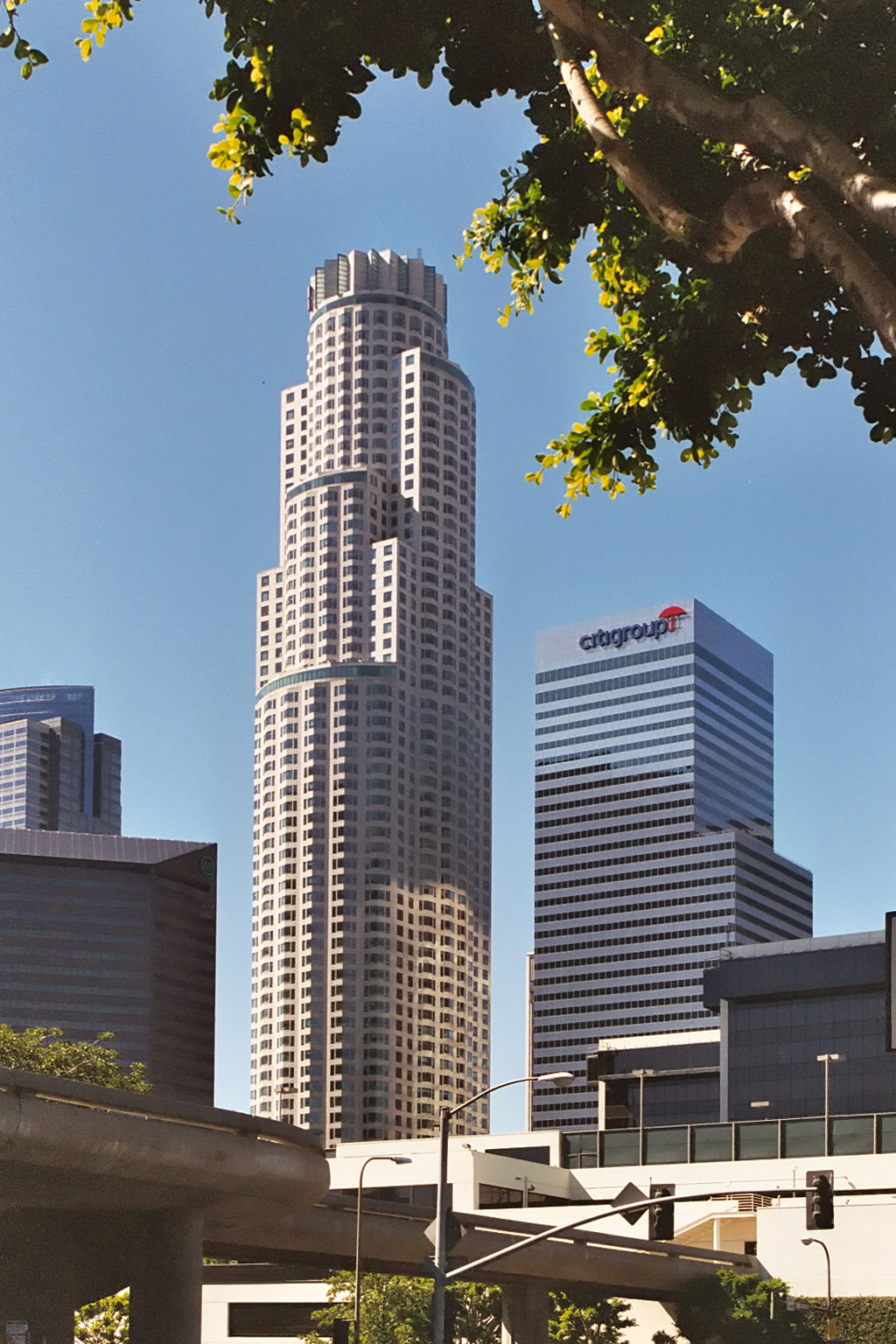
The U.S. Bank Tower, for many years the tallest building in the United States west of the Mississippi River, designed by Pei Cobb Freed & Partners

PCF Architects, formerly Pei Cobb Freed & Partners, is an American architectural firm based in New York City, founded in 1955 by I. M. Pei and other associates. The firm has received numerous awards for its work.

The firm provides architectural services, as well as planning and urban design.

The firm has changed names three times:

- 1955 – Originally I. M. Pei & Associates, founded by I. M. Pei, Eason H. Leonard, and Henry N. Cobb
- 1966 – Renamed I. M. Pei & Partners
- 1989 – Renamed Pei Cobb Freed & Partners
- 2026 – Renamed PCF Architects

== Notable Works ==
- 7 Bryant Park, an office tower in New York City
- World One and World Crest in Mumbai, luxury residential towers, and Supremus Office, a boutique office tower, all at Lodha Place in Central Mumbai, a mixed-use development based on a 2009 master plan by Pei Cobb Freed & Partners
- Tivoli Kanten | Tivoli Edge, a mixed-use project in Copenhagen
- Soyak Krystal Kule, a corporate headquarters in Istanbul
- 1000 Connecticut Avenue, an office building in Washington, D.C.
- Fiterman Hall at Borough of Manhattan Community College and Law School and Residence Hall at Fordham University's Lincoln Center Campus, both in New York City
- McGlothlin Medical Education Center at Virginia Commonwealth University
- an Expansion Campus for China Europe International Business School in Shanghai, adjacent to the original campus by Pei Cobb Freed & Partners.
- Palazzo Lombardia, the new seat of the Lombardy Regional Government, in Milan
- 200 West Street, the headquarters of Goldman Sachs in New York City
- NASCAR Hall of Fame in Charlotte, North Carolina
- Milstein Family Heart Center in New York
- First International Bank Tower in Tel Aviv
- Butler College Dormitories at Princeton University
- WaveRock, an office building in Hyderabad, India
- Federal Reserve Bank of Kansas City
- Organisation for Economic Co-operation and Development Headquarters in Paris
- Torre Espacio, an office tower on Madrid's major avenue Paseo de la Castellana.
- John F. Kennedy Library, John Hancock Tower, and John Joseph Moakley United States Courthouse and Harborpark in Boston
- J.P. Morgan Chase Tower in Houston
- Dallas City Hall, the Morton H. Meyerson Symphony Center, and Fountain Place in Dallas
- Bank of China Tower in Hong Kong
- Taishin International Bank Tower in Taipei
- U.S. Bank Tower in Los Angeles
- First Bank Place in Minneapolis
- Jacob K. Javits Convention Center in New York
- National Constitution Center on Independence Mall in Philadelphia
- Rock and Roll Hall of Fame and Museum in Cleveland
- the expansion and modernization of the Louvre museum in Paris
- San Francisco Main Public Library
- the East Building of the National Gallery of Art, the Ronald Reagan Building and International Trade Center and the United States Holocaust Memorial Museum in Washington, D.C.

== Awards ==
The firm received the Distinguished Achievement Award from the National Academy in 2017; New York State AIA Firm Award in 2009; the Lifetime Achievement Award from the New York Society of Architects in 1992; and the Chicago Architecture Award, in recognition of "significant contributions to architecture and to the design of urban environments," in 1985. The Poses Creative Arts Award, which honors a distinguished body of work and leadership in the development of an art form, was awarded to the firm in 1981, in recognition of its "architectural innovation and excellence, having enriched the American landscape with some of its most graceful and aesthetically satisfying works of architectural art." In 1968 the American Institute of Architects conferred its Architectural Firm Award, citing the "eminently successful collaboration among the partners, associates and staff ... which has resulted in years of consistently distinguished design."
