= KGI Financial Holding =

Financial Holding Corporation in Taiwan

KGI Financial Holding Co., Ltd.

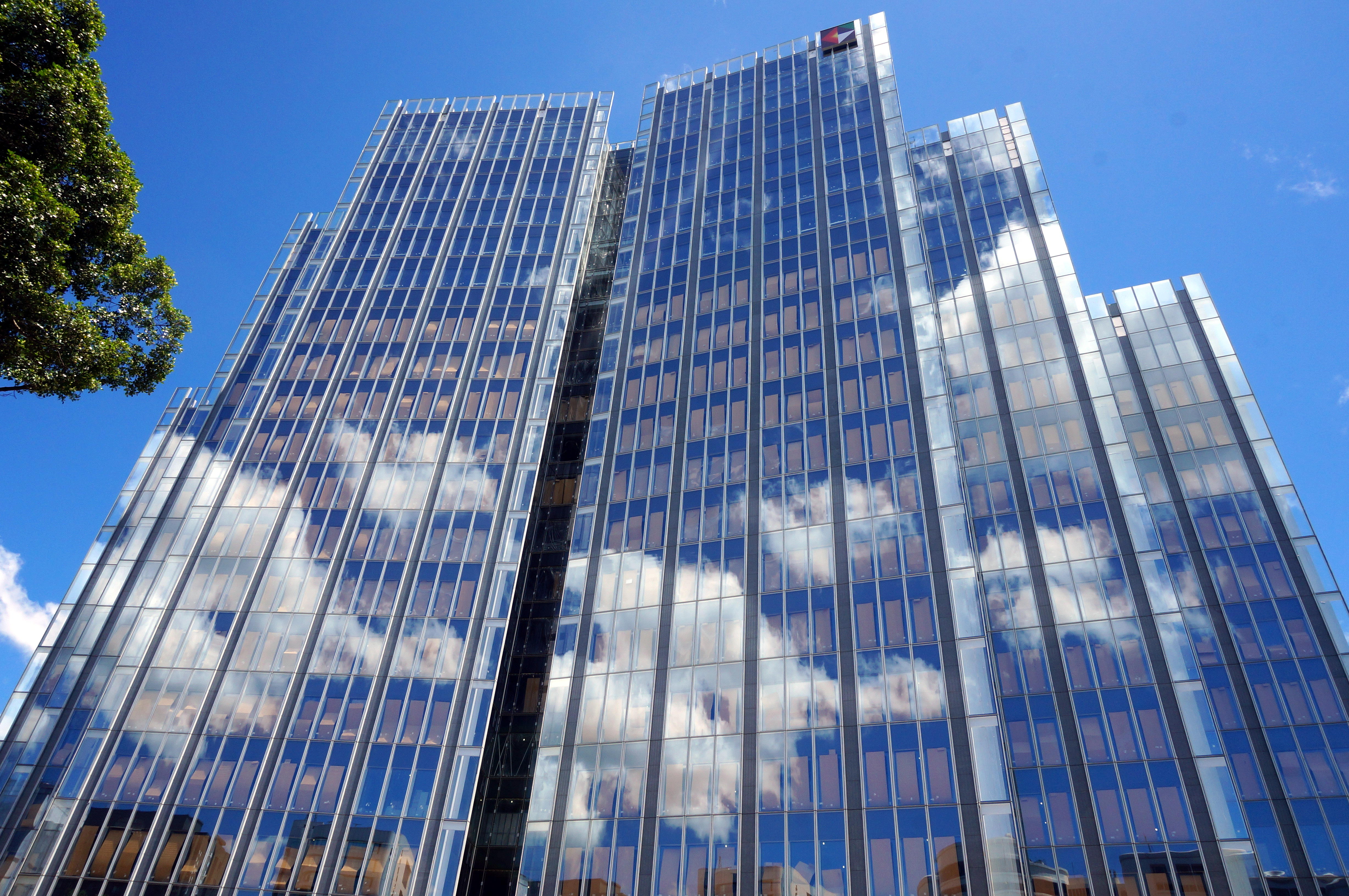
- KGI headquarters
- Company type: Financial Holding Company, Public Company
- Industry: Financial Services
- Founded: 28 December 2001
- Headquarters: Songshan District, Taipei, Taiwan
- Key people: Alan Wang (chairman); Paul Yang (president and CEO)
- Total assets: NTD$3,498,255,860
- Total equity: NTD$149,763,033,620元
- Owners: Chin Wen Investment Co., LTD; Jing Kwan Investment Co., LTD. Bank of Taiwan
- Subsidiaries: CDIB Capital Group; KGI Bank; KGI Securities; KGI Life; KGI SITE
- Website: www.kgi.com/en

KGI Financial Holding Co., Ltd. (KGI Financial; Chinese: 凱基金融控股股份有限公司; pinyin: KGI Jīnróng Kònggǔ Gǔfèn Yǒuxiàn Gōngsī), formerly China Development Financial Holding Co., Ltd. (CDF), is a Financial Holding Corporation in Taiwan founded by Jeffrey Koo Sr. and the Koo Family. It mainly does business with its key subsidiaries the CDIB Capital Group, KGI Securities, KGI Bank and KGI Life. Today, the company is chaired by Angelo Koo, the fourth-generation of the Koo Family.

== Development history ==
In 1959, China Development Corporation was established through the collective efforts of the Economic Stabilization Committee of the Executive Yuan, the World Bank, and public capital as Taiwan's financial institution focusing on direct investments.

In 1999, China Development Corporation was restructured as China Development Industrial Bank (CDIB).

In December 2001 China Development Financial Holding Co., Ltd. (CDF) was established by way of a stock swap. On November 8, 2002, the Grand Cathay Securities Corporation and Elite Securities became subsidiaries of CDF through a stock swap. On December 31, 2003, CDF merged Grand Cathay Securities and Elite Securities.

In 2005, CDF planned to acquire Jinding Securities, however CDF was not able to get Jinding Securities' original management team to agree. After four years of continuing to buy stocks, in 2009 CDF had finally held a 48% stake in Jingding Securities, but following five years of controversy CDF was ultimately unable to merge with Jingding Securities.

In 2012, CDF publicly acquired the second largest securities firm in Taiwan, KGI Securities, for NT$54.6 billion, with the largest merger in the history of Taiwan. KGI was acquired at NT$5.5 per share cash at a 1.2 to 1 exchange rate. The exchange was complete on January 18, 2013, and CDF acquired 100% of the stock rights for KGI. On June 22 of that same year, KGI Securities merged with Grand Cathay Securities Corporation with KGI being the surviving company.

In June 2013, KGI Securities merged with Grand Cathay Securities, another subsidiary within CDF. After the business integration of its two major securities companies, it has become the leader of domestic investment banks, bonds and new financial products.

In 2014, CDF acquired Cosmos Bank as a subsidiary at the cost of NT$23.09 billion, and in 2015 Cosmos Bank became known as “KGI Commercial Bank”. From this point on, CDIB's Corporate Finances and Financial Markets were ceded to KGI Commercial Bank.

In March 2017, CDIB transformed into CDIB Capital Group in March 2017. Continuing the core of Industrial Bank, CDIB Capital Group is committed to private equity investment funds and actively expand asset management business.

In September 2017, China Life (renamed KGI Life in 2024) became an integral part of the group.

In April 2021, CDF committed net zero carbon emissions by 2045

In October 2021, CDF convened an extraordinary shareholders’ meeting and approves the acquisition of all remaining China Life stock.

In October 2021, CDF completed the move to its new headquarters on the 20th anniversary of the holding company.

In August 2024, renamed to KGI Financial Holding Co., Ltd..

== See also ==
- List of companies of Taiwan
