= Prince Motors (Taiwan) =

Prince Motors Co., Ltd.
- Type: Private Company, limited Liability
- Industry: Automotive Manufacturing
- Founded: 6 July 1965; 61 years ago
- Founder: Hsu Sheng-fa
- Headquarters: No. 611, Section 5, Chongxin Rd, Sanchong District, New Taipei City, Taiwan
- Products: Automobiles

The Prince Motors Co. was a Taiwanese automobile manufacturing company established on 6 July 1965 by Hsu Sheng-fa. Initially, Prince Motors Co. imported chassis and assembles commercial vehicles and utility trucks and was the main procuration of the Japanese Komatsu and Mitsubishi Kato trucks. Starting from 1971, Prince Motors Co. also produced Nissan Homer commercial vehicles for Nissan and further introduced products labelled YLN-251, 252, 253, 255 under the sales partner of Yulon Nissan in Taiwan.

Starting from the 1970s to 1980s, the increasing demands of the Nissan Homer vans created the venues for the company to produce self branded Prince forklifts. After the contract with Nissan ended, the company started the contract with the Japanese Suzuki and Isuzu brands and the assembly line was located in Tucheng District, New Taipei City, Taiwan.

From 1990, Prince Motors Co started to produce and sell models including the Suzuki Cultus, Suzuki Escudo, Suzuki Vitara, Suzuki Grand Vitara, Suzuki Carry, and Suzuki Every. In 2001, the Suzuki Solio was also added to replace the Suzuki Cultus and became the best selling subcompact cars in Taiwan with sales of over 30 thousand annually. The Suzuki Solio was later replaced by the Suzuki Swift which also was produced by Prince Motors Co. in Taiwan.

In 2007, Hsu Sheng-fa, the founder of Prince Motors Co. went bankrupt due to the failure of investments.

In 2009, Chery Automobile Co., an emerging carmaker from mainland China, has agreed with Taiwan's Shengrong Auto, a subsidiary of Prince Motors, to make its own brand cars in Taiwan for the local and foreign markets. Products produced in Taiwan includes the Chery A3 sedan and hatchback. The deal resulted in the refusal of Suzuki supplying parts to Prince Motors, only allowing complete imported vehicles to be sold in Taiwan.

In 2011, Prince Motors went bankrupt and the demise of the Prince Motors Co. ended the 22-year contract between Suzuki and Prince Motors Co. Production and sales along with 20% share from Prince Motors Co. were returned to Suzuki Taiwan.
