= Taishin International Bank Tower =

Skyscraper office building in Da'an, Taipei, Taiwan

Taishin International Bank Tower 台新金控大樓
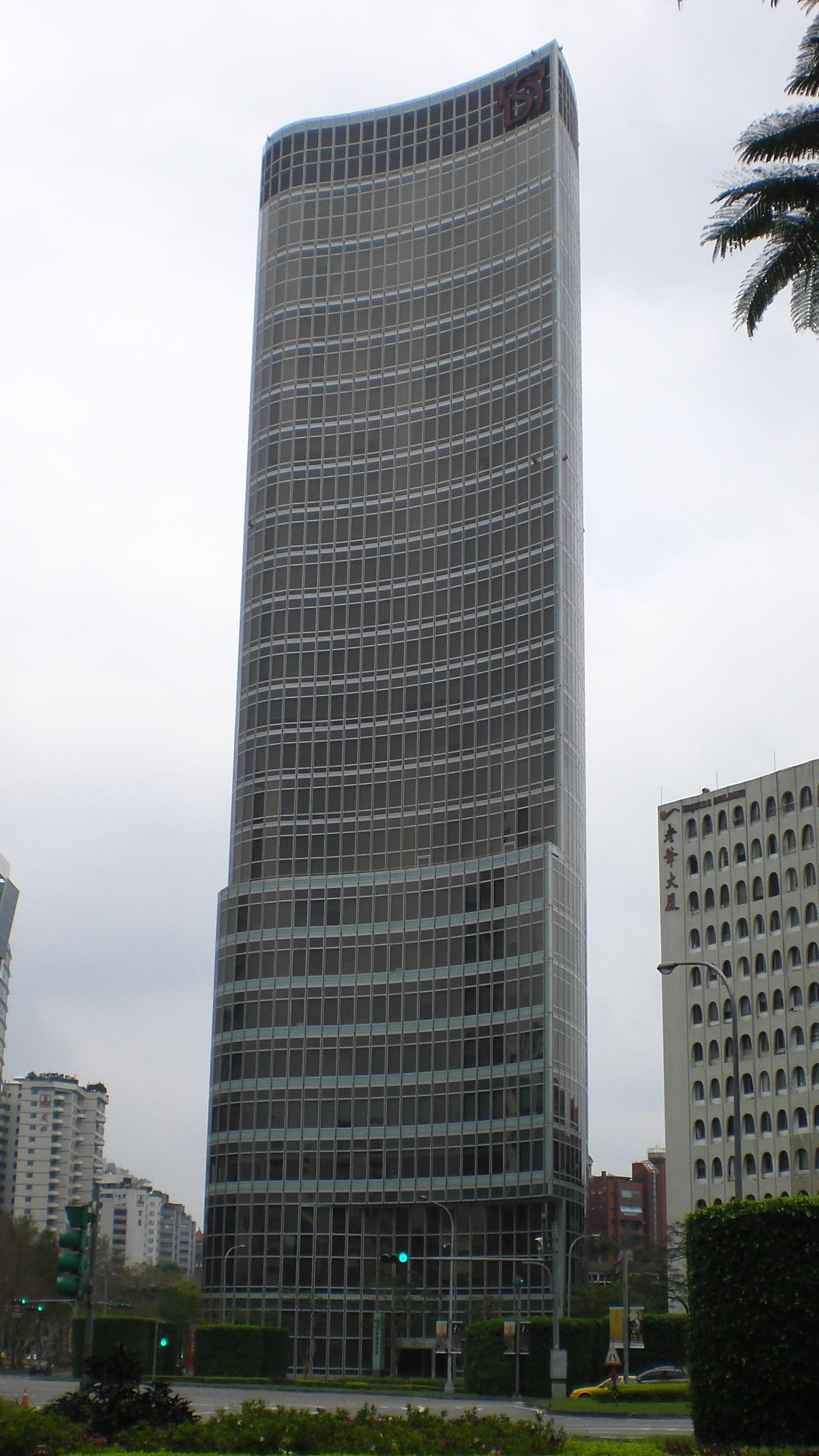
- Interactive map of the Taishin International Bank Tower 台新金控大樓 area

General information
- Type: Office
- Location: No. 118, Section 4, Renai Road, Daan District, Taipei, Taiwan
- Coordinates: 25°02′14.6″N 121°32′59.2″E
- Construction started: 2002
- Completed: 2004

Height
- Architectural: 123 m (404 ft)

Technical details
- Floor count: 25

Design and construction
- Architects: Pei Cobb Freed & Partners + Haigo Shen & Associates

The Taishin International Bank Tower (Chinese: 台新金控大樓) is a skyscraper office building in Daan District, Taipei, Taiwan. The height of building is 123 m (404 ft), and it comprises 25 floors above ground, as well as six basement levels. It is the corporate headquarters of Taishin Financial Holdings.

== Design ==
The tower was completed in 2004 and was designed by Pei Cobb Freed & Partners and Haigo Shen & Associates. Inspired by the Bank of China Tower in Hong Kong, it was primarily designed by the same architectural firm. The overall shape of the building represents a water droplet as the principle design concepts. The exterior walls of the building use low-reflective light-blue glass façade, and the selection of building materials is based on environmental protection concepts.

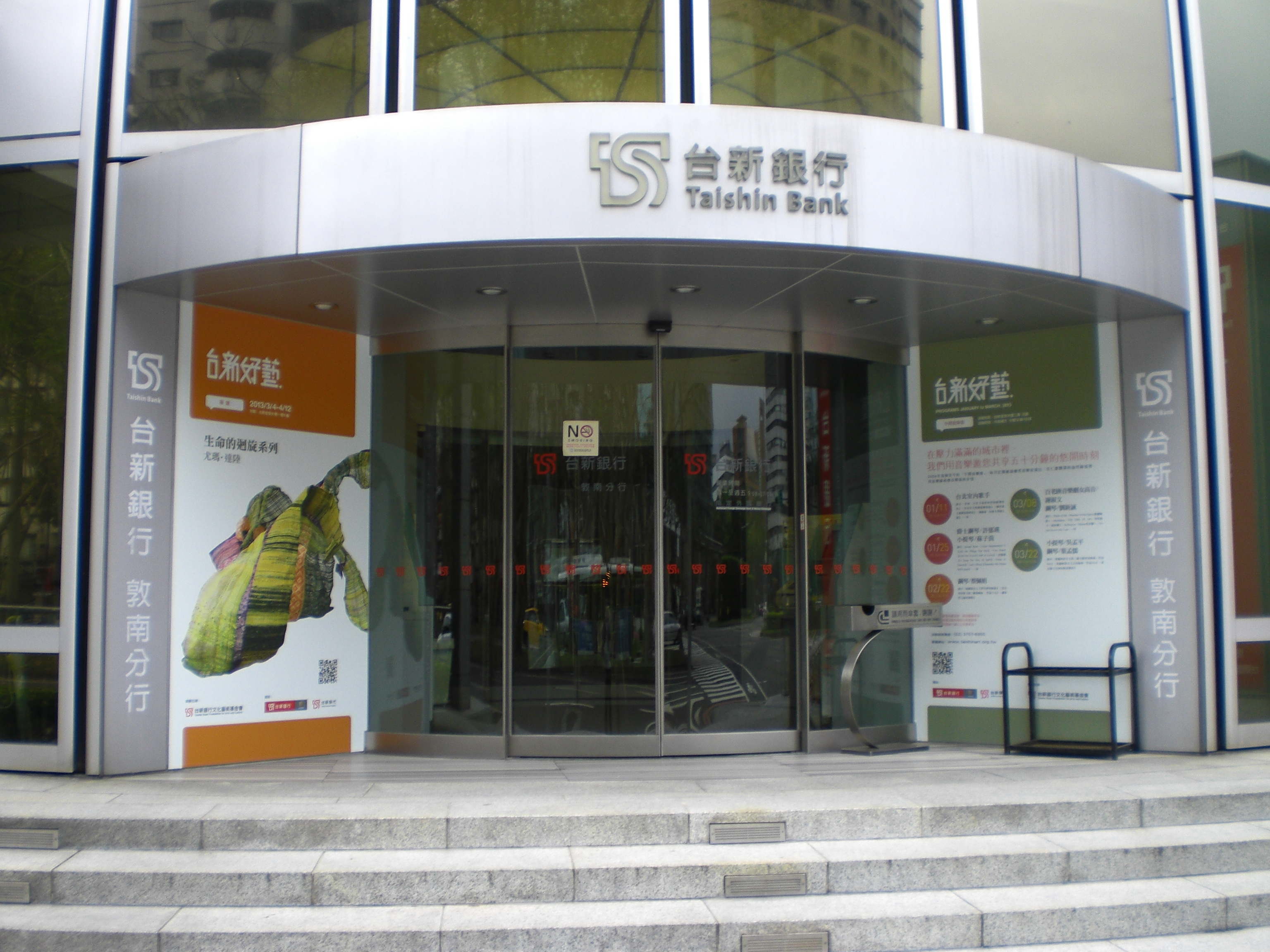
Entrance

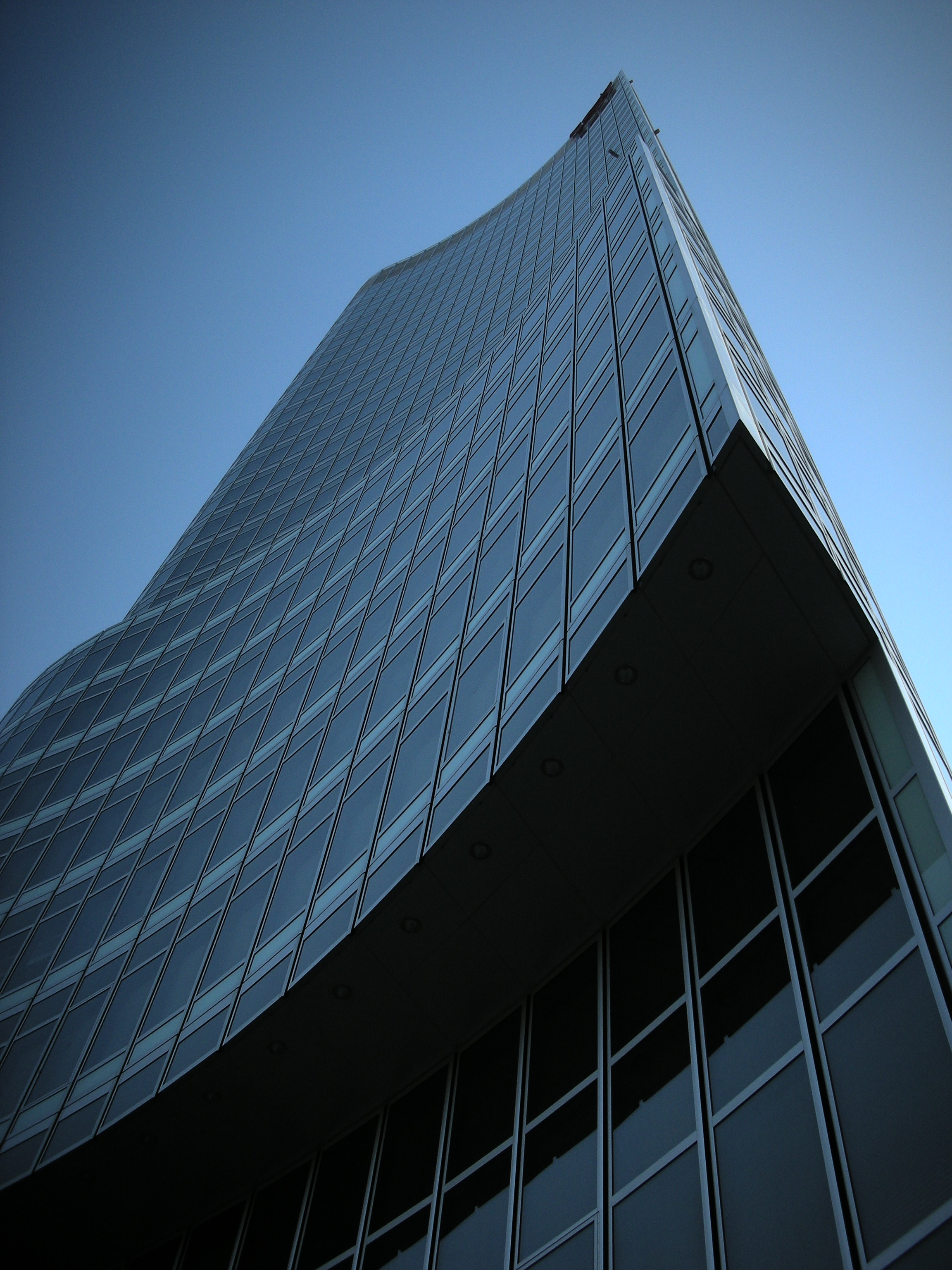

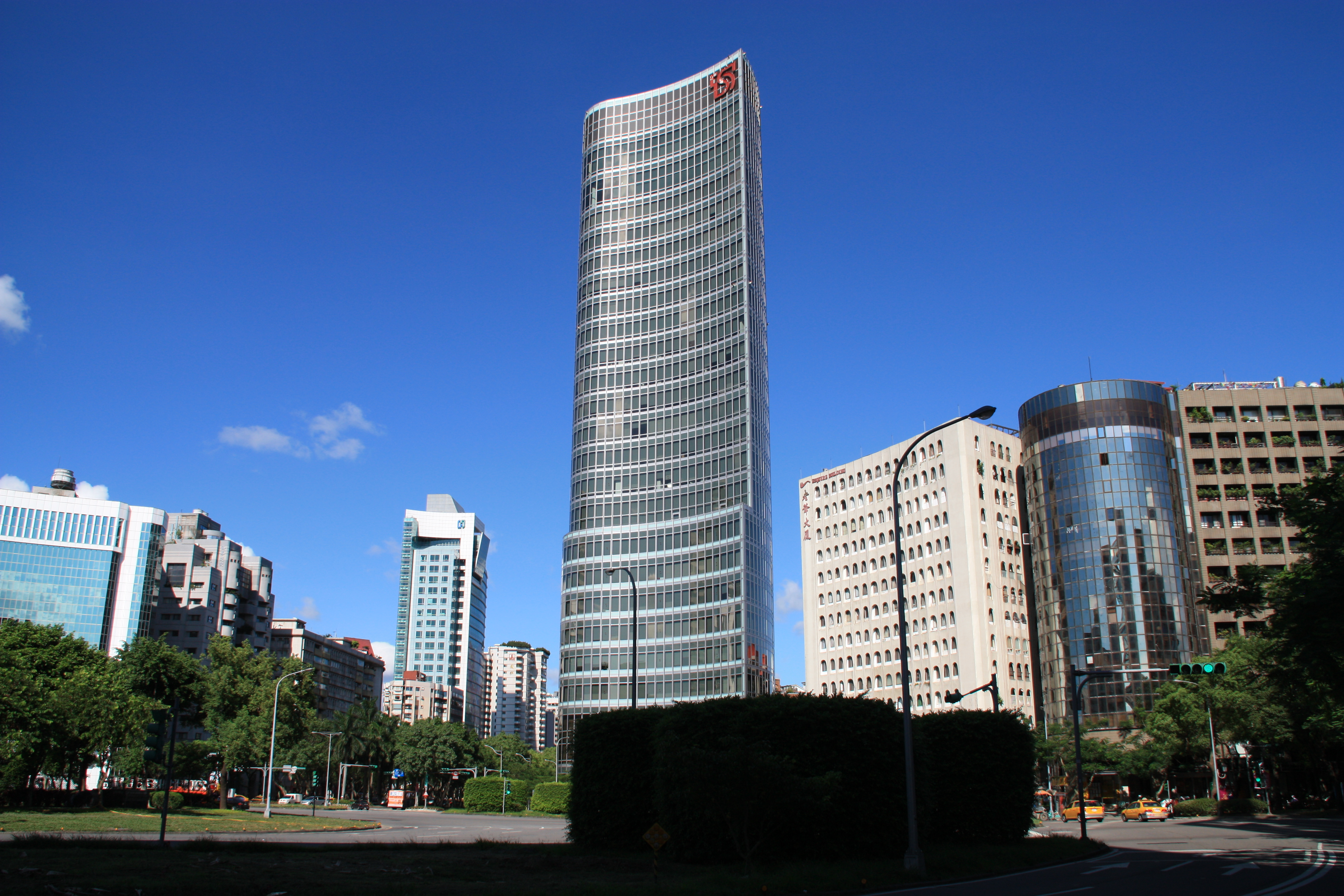

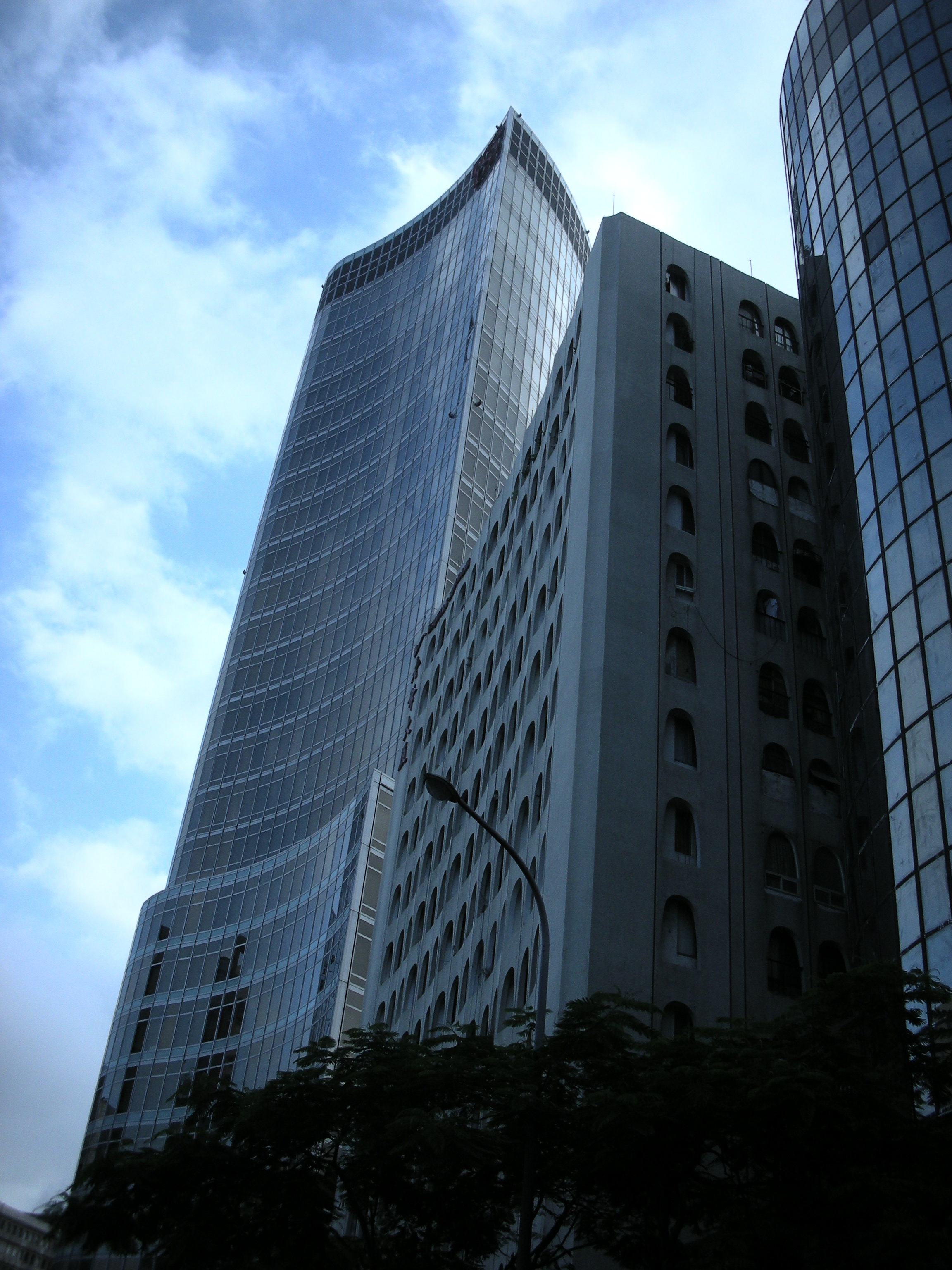

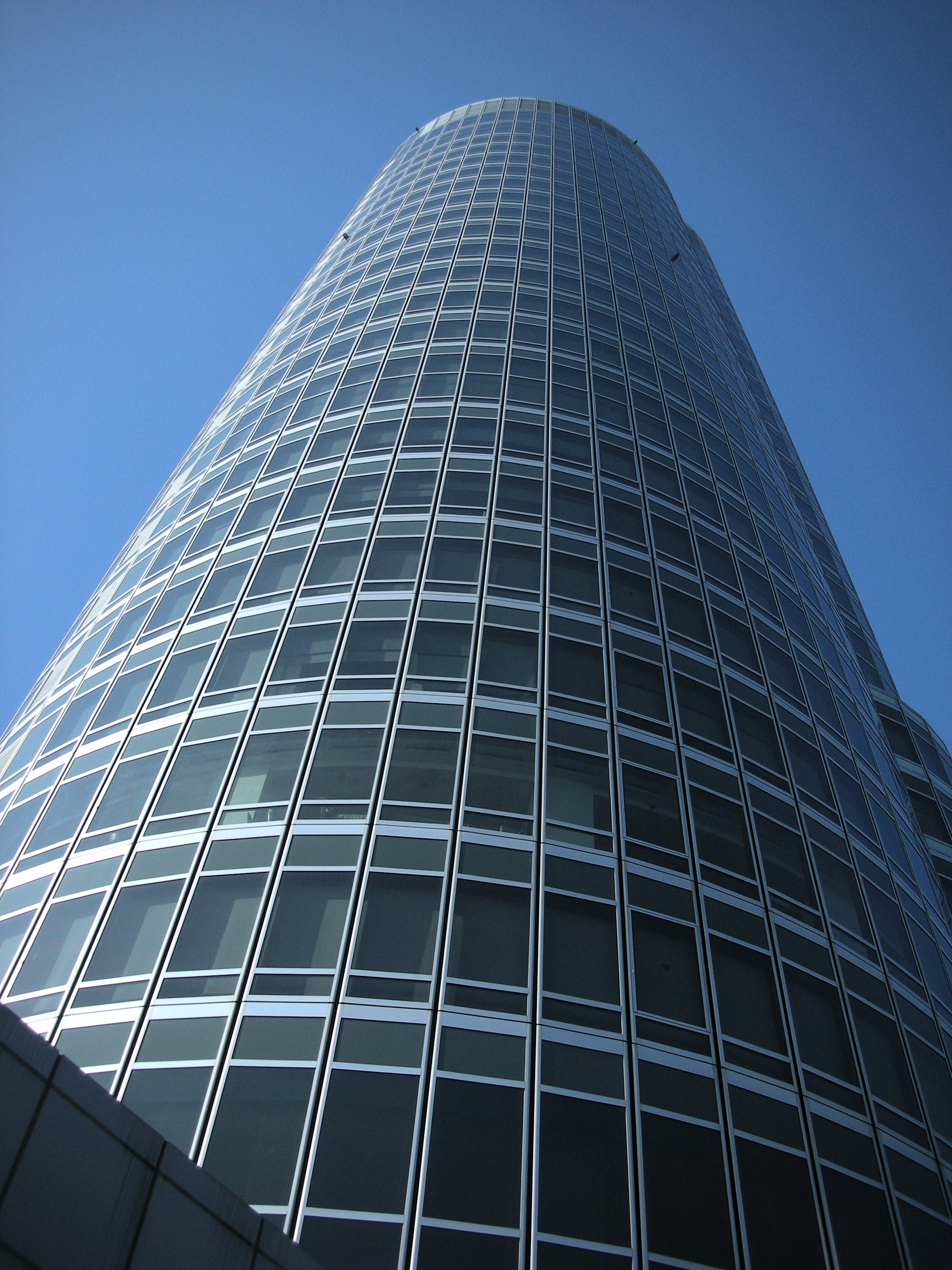

== See also ==
- List of tallest buildings in Taiwan
- List of tallest buildings in Taipei
- Taishin Financial Holdings
