= Hsu Sheng-fa =

Taiwanese entrepreneur and politician (1925–2021)

- 許勝發

Member of Legislative Yuan
- In office 1981–1990

Personal details
- Born: 24 January 1925 Japanese Taiwan
- Died: 17 April 2021 (aged 96) Taipei, Taiwan
- Party: Kuomintang
- Children: Hsu Sen-rong, Hsu Juan-juan, Hsu Hsien-hsien
- Occupation: Businessperson

Hsu Sheng-fa (Chinese: 許勝發; 24 January 1925 – 17 April 2021) was a Taiwanese businessman and politician. He served on the Legislative Yuan as a member of the Kuomintang from 1981 to 1990.

== Life and career ==
Hsu was born in 1925 in Japanese Taiwan. He founded Prince Motors in 1965. The company became a Taiwan-based sales agent of Suzuki Motors. As the company fell into debt, a layoff affecting 1,000 employees took place, which led to a protest outside company headquarters in November 2012.

Hsu founded Cosmos Bank, the predecessor to KGI Bank, in 1992. He sold eighty percent of the bank's shares in 2007, and stepped down as chairman. In 2008, Hsu was investigated and questioned by the Taipei District Prosecutors' Office regarding alleged embezzlement.

Hsu was a member of the Legislative Yuan between 1981 and 1990. He remained politically active after leaving the legislature, serving on the Central Standing Committee of the Kuomintang as well as chairing the China National Federation of Industry. He later worked for Lien Chan's 2000 presidential campaign, and served on the Straits Exchange Foundation.

Hsu has three children. His only son Hsu Sen-rong was vice chairman of Cosmos Bank. His daughters are Hsu Juan-juan and Hsu Hsien-hsien, who married Eugene Wu.

He died on 17 April 2021, aged 96. at the Shin Kong Wu Ho-Su Memorial Hospital in Taipei.
