= Hsu Yang-ming =

Taiwanese politician (born 1952)

Hsu Yang-ming (Chinese: 許陽明; born 31 December 1952) is a Taiwanese politician.

== Political career ==
Hsu won election to the National Assembly in 1991, as a representative of Taipei and the Democratic Progressive Party. Within the DPP, Hsu was active in the Chen Shui-bian-led Justice Alliance faction. In the early 2000s, Hsu served as deputy secretary-general of the DPP. In this position, Hsu commented on party actions related to allegations of corruption against James Tsai, and discussed several aspects of DPP campaigns during the 2001 local elections. He later served as deputy mayor of Tainan under Hsu Tain-tsair.

== Personal life ==
Hsu is married to Kuan Bi-ling, and has aided Kuan's political career by making art and fliers for her campaigns.
