= KGI Bank =

Commercial bank in Taiwan

KGI Bank 凱基商業銀行

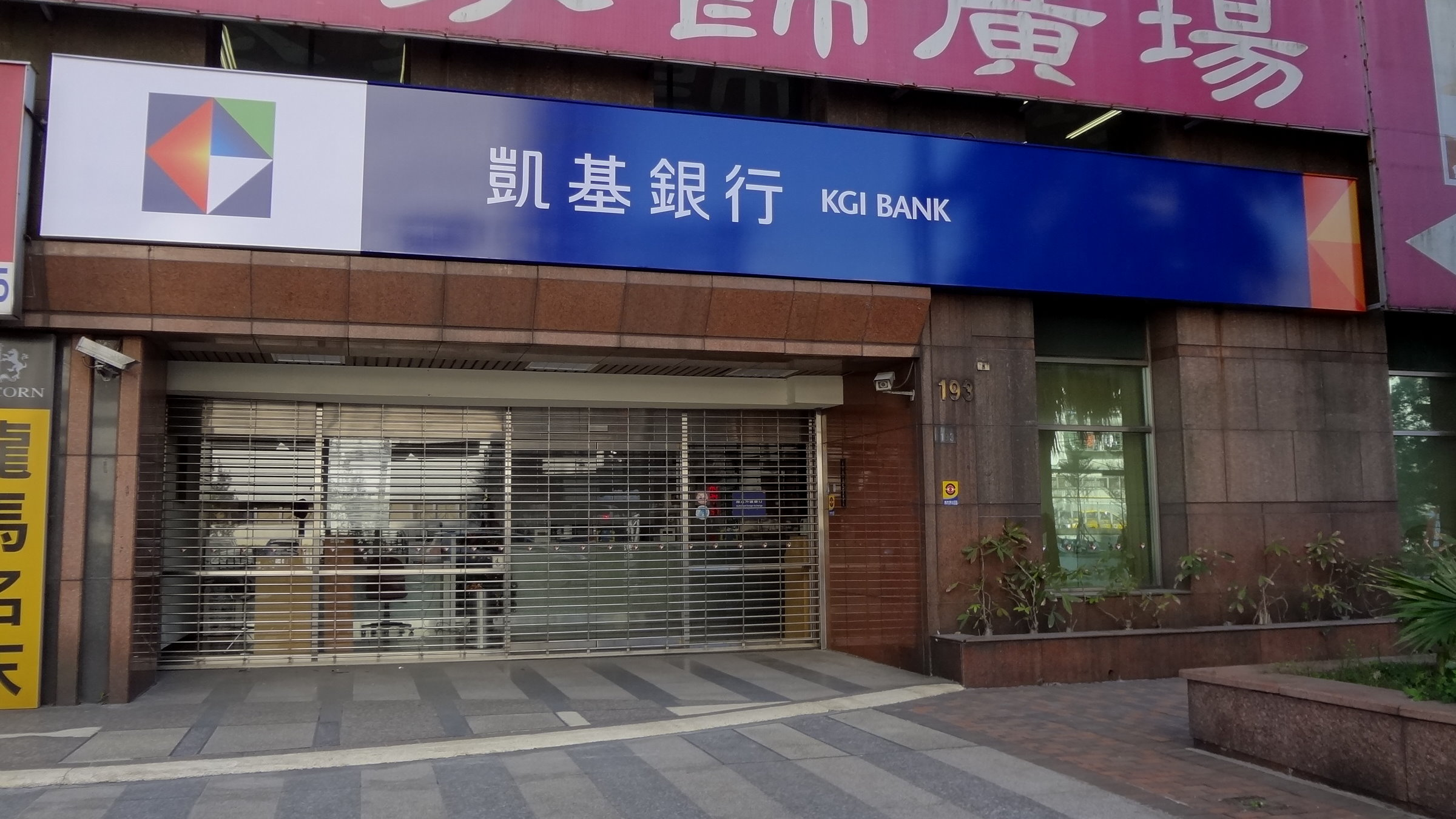
- KGI Bank Keelung Branch
- Industry: Banking
- Founded: 12 February 1992
- Founder: Hsu Sheng-fa
- Headquarters: Songshan, Taipei, Taiwan
- Key people: Angelo Koo, Chairman; Richard Chang, President
- Products: Financial services
- Total assets: NT$519,056,260,000 (30 June 2016)
- Website: Official website

KGI Bank (traditional Chinese: 凱基商業銀行; simplified Chinese: 凯基商业银行; pinyin: Kǎijī Shāngyè Yínháng; Wade–Giles: K'ai^{3}-Chi^{1} Shang^{1}-yeh^{4} Yin^{2}-hang^{2}) is a commercial bank of Taiwan. It is part of KGI Financial Holding.

== History ==
=== Early Years as Cosmos Bank (1991–2014) ===
The financial institution founded by Hsu Sheng-fa obtained its incorporation approval on 13 August 1991 as Cosmos Bank. It acquired its license on 14 January 1992 and officially began operations on 12 February 1992.

On 10 February 2014, the bank agreed on share-swap to make it a subsidiary of KGI Financial Holding Corporation (CDF) and officially became CDF subsidiary on 15 September 2014. CDF acquired Cosmos Bank at the cost of NT$23.09 billion.

=== KGI Bank (2015–Present) ===
In January 2015, Cosmos Bank was renamed as KGI Commercial Bank.

From this point on, CDIB's Corporate Banking and Financial Markets were ceded to KGI Commercial Bank.

== See also ==
- List of banks in Taiwan
- KGI Financial Holding
