= Taishin (given name) =

- Gender: Male

Origin
- Origin: Japanese
- Meaning: Different meanings depending on the kanji used

Taishin (written: 太信, 大伸 or 泰臣) is a masculine Japanese given name. Notable people with the name include:

- Taishin Kohiruimaki (小比類巻 太信; born 1977), Japanese kickboxer and karateka
- Taishin Minamide (南出 大伸; born 1996), Japanese swimmer
