= TS Financial Holdings =

Taishin Financial Holding Co., Ltd.
- Native name: 台新新光金融控股公司
- Type: Public
- Traded as: TWSE: 2887
- Industry: Banking
- Founded: December 31, 2001 (approved); February 18, 2002 (business commenced)
- Headquarters: Taipei, Taiwan
- Key people: Thomas Wu (Chairman)
- Products: Financial services
- Total assets: ▲NT$ 2,346.86 billions (2008)
- Subsidiaries: Taishin International Bank, Taishin Securities, Taishin Futures, Taishin Bills Finance, Taishin Venture Capital, Taishin Asset Management, Taishin Marketing Consultant, Taishin Life Insurance , Shin Kong Life Insurance , Shin Kong Commercial Bank , MasterLink Securities
- Website: www.tsholdings.com.tw

Taishin Financial is a financial services company headquartered in Taipei, Taiwan. Taishin Financial Holdings consists of subsidiaries in the sectors of banking, securities, bills finance, assets management, and venture capital.

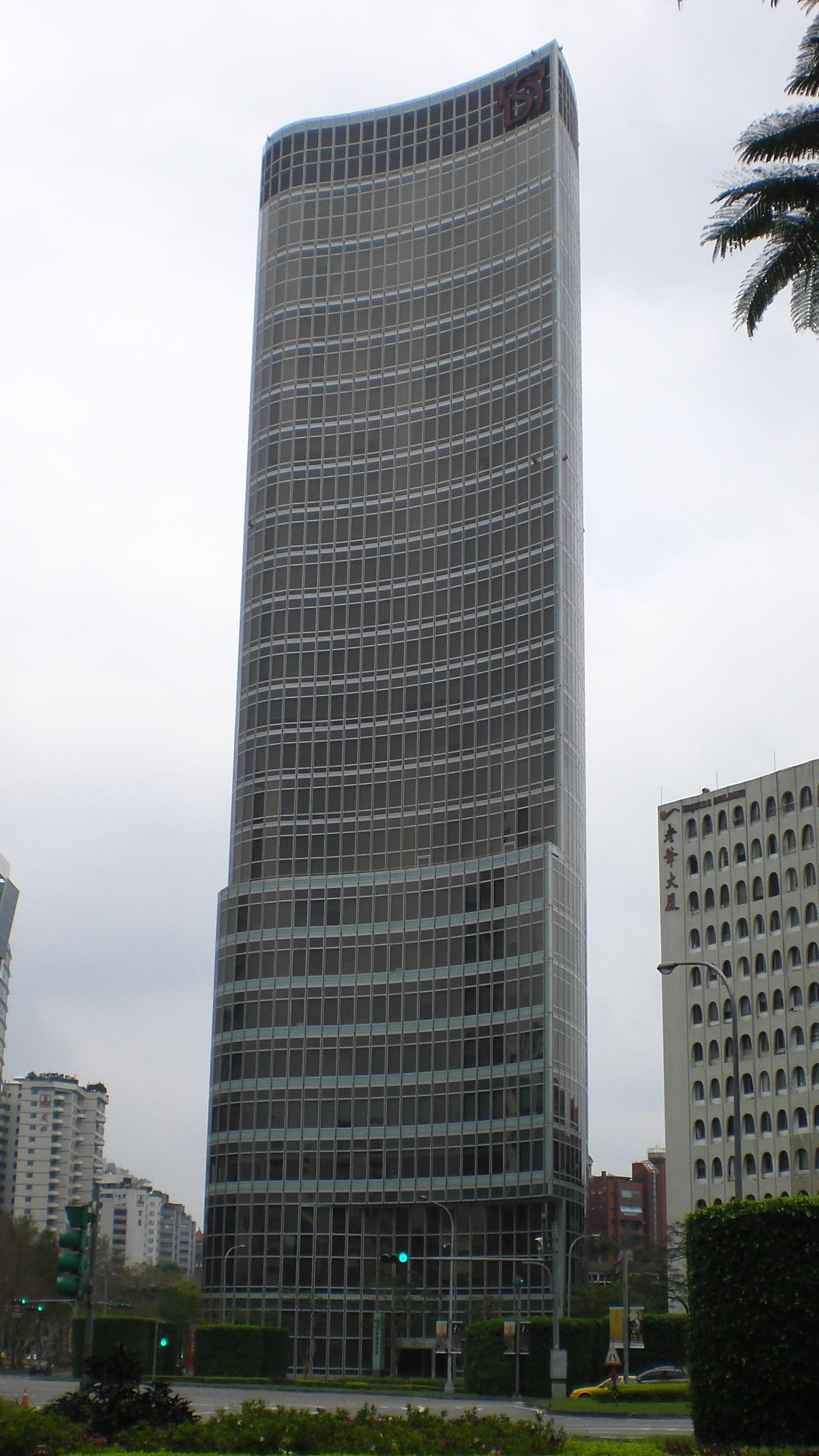
Taishin International Bank Tower (台新金控大樓) in Taipei.

The company's main subsidiary, Taishin Futures Co., Ltd., is a Taiwanese brokerage with headquarters in Taipei. It was founded in 1997 as a joint venture between Taishin Securities Co., Ltd. and Taishin International Bank, and is a member of the Taishin Financial Holdings. It involves in futures including brokerage, consultation, management and dealer business. The company is a member of Taiwan Futures Exchange.

On July 24, 2025, Companies Taishin Financial Holding and Shin Kong Financial Holding merged to form Company TS Financial Holding.

== See also ==
- List of banks in Taiwan
- Economy of Taiwan
- List of companies of Taiwan
