= Shin Kong Group =

Corporate group based in Taiwan

- Founded: 1945
- Headquarters: 66, Sec.1, Chung-Hsiao W. Rd., Taipei, Taiwan (Shin Kong Life Tower) 10018
- Key people: Eugene Wu

The Shin Kong Group (Chinese: 新光集團; pinyin: Xīnguāng jítuán; Pe̍h-ōe-jī: Sin-kong Chi̍p-thôan) is a large enterprise group in Taiwan, the group traces its origin back to the establishment of the Shin Kong Store in 1945 by group founder Wu Ho-su. The Shin Kong Store was engaged in the trading of fabrics and the import and export of sugar and tea. Wu created the name "Shin Kong" from the first Chinese character in the name Hsinchu, the city where he was born, and the first character in the given name of his business benefactor Ogawa Mitsusada (小川光定).

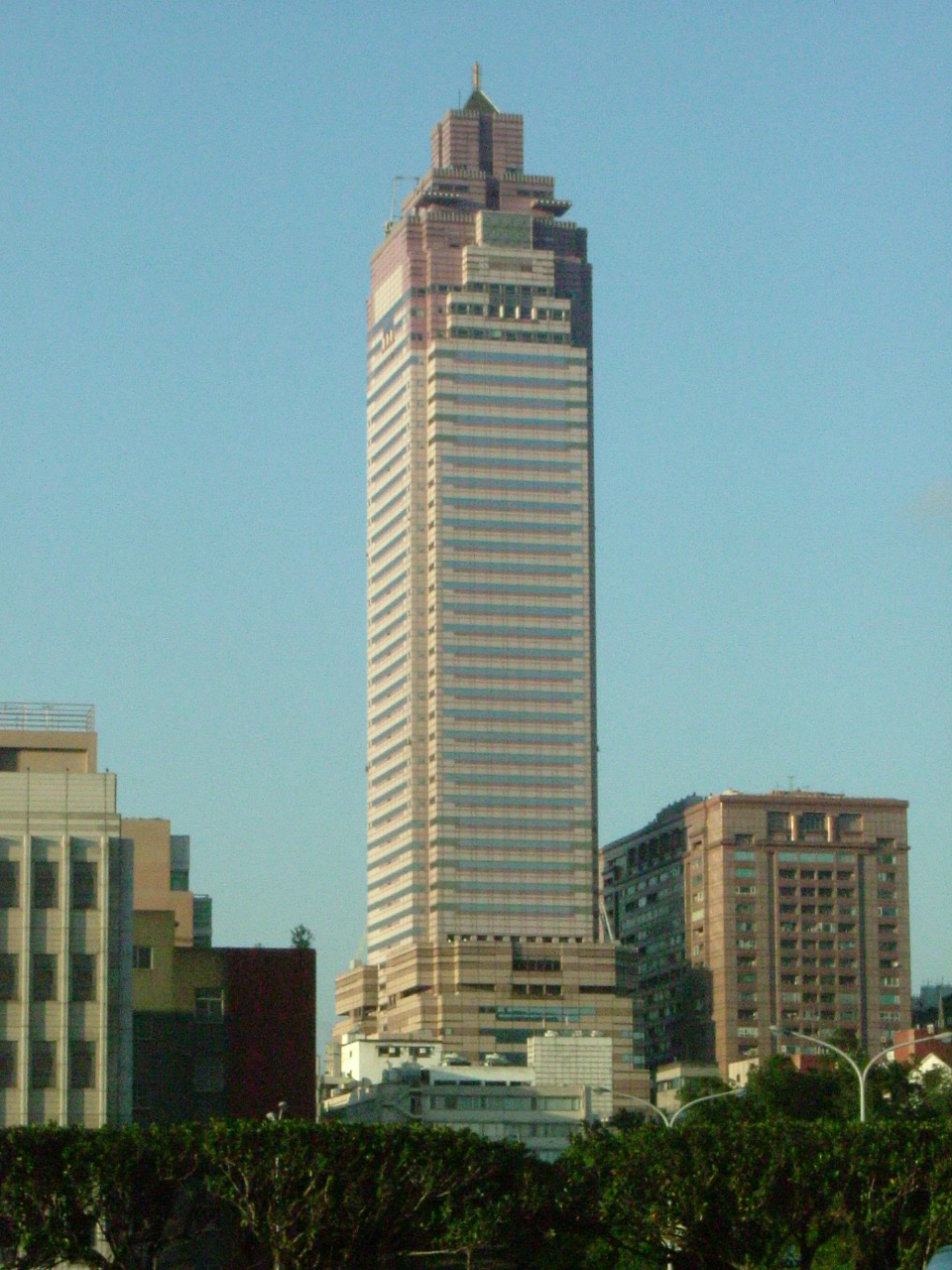
Shin Kong Life Tower

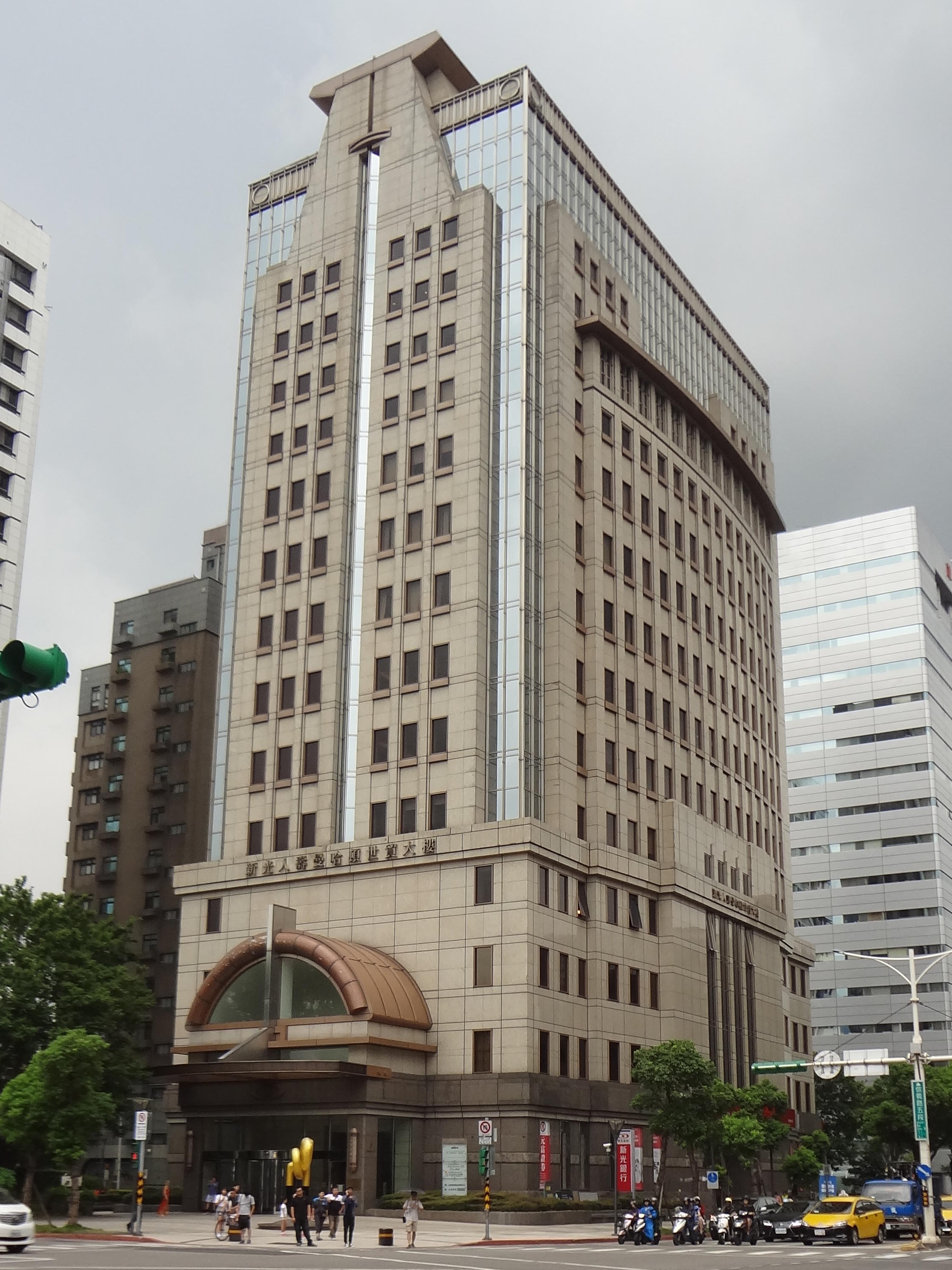
Shin Kong Manhattan Building

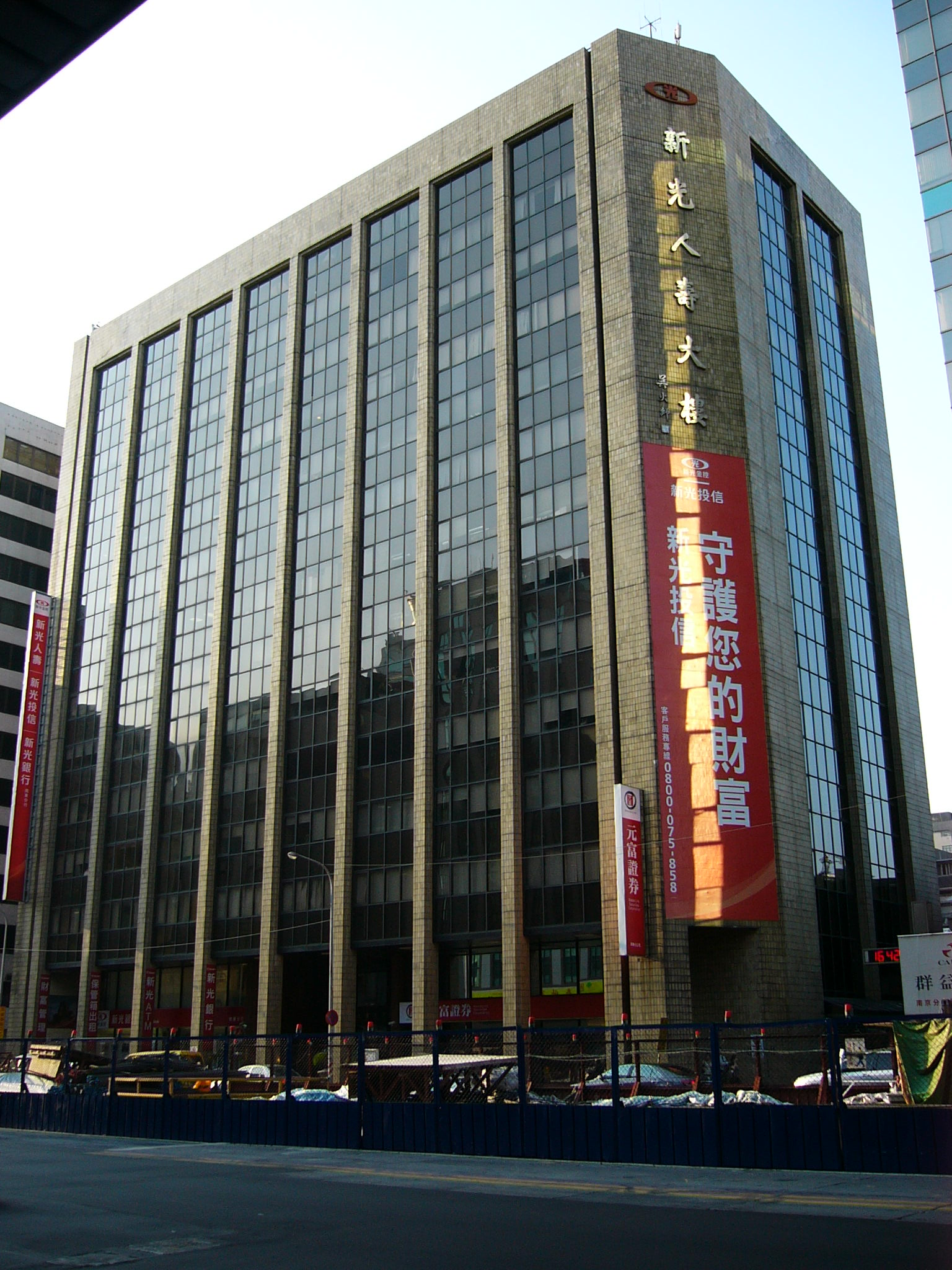
Shin Kong Life Nanking Building

== History ==
Months after end of the Second World War which saw defeat of Japanese Empire, a group of Taiwanese businessmen, namely Wu Ho-Su, Hung Wan-Chuan, and Lin Teng-Shan founded the Shin Kong Trading Company. The company initially focused in cloth trading and import and export of sugar, tea and other products.

In 1951, Wu extended Shin Kong's reach in the textile industry with the founding of Shinkong Spinning Co., Ltd. The company steadily expanded into other industries with the establishment of Shinkong Insurance and Shin Kong Life Insurance in 1963 and the Great Taipei Gas Corporation in 1964, setting a strong base for the company's future. In 1986, Eugene Wu assumed the chairmanship of the group. The group subsequently established Shin Kong Wu Ho-Su Memorial Hospital in 1992 and completed the landmark Shin Kong Life Tower in Taipei the following year. Since then, Shin Kong has steadily diversified and grown to become an integrated business with operations covering the financial, security, manufacturing, consumer, medical, and philanthropy sectors.

Shin Kong Financial Holding Co., Ltd. (SKFH) was founded as a publicly listed company in 2002. Through its subsidiaries Shin Kong Life Insurance, Shin Kong Bank, MasterLink Securities, Shin Kong Investment Trust, Shin Kong Property Insurance Agency, and Shin Kong Venture Capital, the company provides financial instruments.

== Businesses ==
Financial Services

- Shin Kong Financial Holding(TWSE: 2888)
  - Shin Kong Life Insurance
    - Shin Kong-HNA Life Insurance
  - Taiwan Shin Kong Commercial Bank
  - MasterLink Securities
  - Shin Kong Investment Trust
  - Shin Kong Property Insurance Agency
  - Shin Kong Venture Capital
  - Shinkong Insurance

Security Services

- Taiwan Shin Kong Security(TWSE: 9925)
- Shin Kong Life Real Estate Service Company

Manufacturing

- Shinkong Textile
- Shinkong Synthetic Fibers

Consumer Services

- The Great Taipei Gas
- Shin Hai Gas
- Shin Kong Chao Feng
- Shin Kong Cinemas
- Shin Kong Mitsukoshi Department Store
- Shin Kong Construction & Development

Medical, Philanthropic and Public Services

- Shin Kong Wu Ho-Su Memorial Hospital
- Shin Kong Medical Club
- Shin Kong Shien Ya International
- Shin Kong Life Insurance Scholarship Foundation
- Shin Kong Life Foundation
- Shin Kong Wu Foundation
- Shin Kong Wu Ho-Su Rescue Foundation
- Shin Kong Wu Ho-Su Culture and Education Foundation
- Shin Kong Bank Education Foundation
