= Taishin International Bank =

Bank headquartered in Taipei, Taiwan

- Native name: 台新國際商業銀行
- Industry: Banking
- Founded: 25 February 1992; 34 years ago
- Headquarters: Da'an, Taipei, Taiwan
- Website: www.taishinbank.com.tw

The Taishin International Bank (Chinese: 台新國際商業銀行; pinyin: Táixīn Guójì Shāngyè Yínháng; Pe̍h-ōe-jī: Tâi-sin-kok-chè-siong-gia̍p-gîn-hâng; often abbreviated to Taishin Bank or TSIB) is one of the largest commercial banks in Taiwan, headquartered in Taipei, Taiwan. It is currently a wholly owned subsidiary of TS Financial Holdings.

== History ==
The bank was established on 25 February 1992 and inaugurated on 23 March the same year. The bank merged Dah An Commercial Bank and established TS Financial Holdings through share swap/share exchange in February 2002.

== See also ==
- List of banks in Taiwan
- Economy of Taiwan
- List of companies of Taiwan
