= Chi-ming Hou =

American economist

- 侯繼明
- Born: 3 December 1924; Zhili (now Hebei), Republic of China
- Died: 22 August 1991 (aged 66)
- Education: Fu Jen Catholic University; University of Oregon; Columbia University
- Scientific career
- Fields: Economics
- Workplaces: Colgate University; Brookings Institution; Harvard University; Chung-Hua Institution for Economic Research

Chi-ming Hou
- Traditional Chinese: 侯繼明
- Simplified Chinese: 侯继明
Transcriptions
Standard Mandarin
- Hanyu Pinyin: Hóu Jìmíng
- Wade–Giles: Hou2 Chi4-ming2

Chi-ming Hou (Chinese: 侯繼明, 3 December 1924 – 22 August 1991) was an American economist.

== Biography ==
Hou was born on December 3, 1924, in Zhili (now Hebei), Republic of China. He obtained a bachelor's degree in law from Fu Jen Catholic University in 1945, a Master of Arts degree from the University of Oregon in 1949, a Ph.D. from Columbia University in 1954.

Since 1956, he has successively served a faculty, Charles A. Dana Professor, Head of Economics Department, Director of Division Social Superior at Colgate University, Hamilton, New York. He is also a research professor at Brookings Institution (1965–1966) and a Research fellow in Chinese economics studies at Harvard University (1959–1962).

He was a Fulbright Lecturer in Taiwan in 1970–1971. Since 1981 he became a Visiting Senior Research Fellow of Chung-Hua Institution for Economic Research.

== Contributions and recognition ==
Hou's representative work is Foreign Investment Economic Development in China 1840-1937, he has been listed as a noteworthy Economics educator by Marquis Who's Who. In addition, he worked with Sho-Chieh Tsiang and Tzong-Shian Yu to study Taiwan's industrial upgrading, and has also cooperated with Lin Chuan and others to study the feasibility of establishing public and railway transportation funds in Taiwan.

- Member, American Economics Association (AEA).
- Member, Association for Asian Studies (AAS).

== See also ==
- Sho-Chieh Tsiang
- Lin Chuan
