= Lee Jih-chu =

Taiwanese economist and politician

- 李紀珠
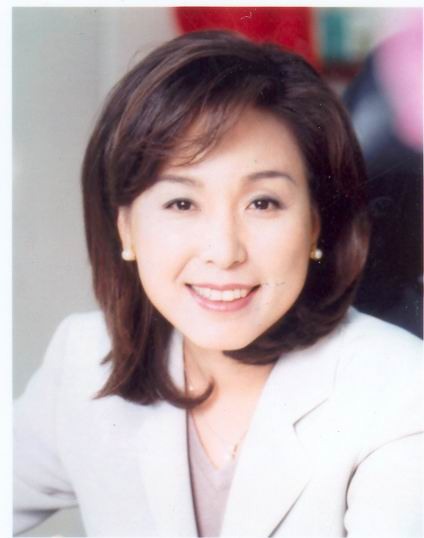

Vice Chairperson of the Financial Supervisory Commission
- In office 1 July 2008 – 17 February 2013
- Chairperson: Gordon Chen; Sean Chen; Chen Yuh-chang
- Preceded by: Lu Tung-ying
- Succeeded by: Wang Li-ling

Member of the Legislative Yuan
- In office 1 February 2005 – 30 June 2008
- Succeeded by: Chen Shu-hui
- Constituency: Republic of China

Chairperson of the National Youth Commission
- In office 10 February 1998 – 19 May 2000
- Preceded by: Huang Teh-fu
- Succeeded by: Lin Fang-mei

Personal details
- Born: 22 April 1960 (age 66) Yilan County, Taiwan
- Party: Kuomintang
- Education: National Chengchi University (BA); National Taiwan University (MA, PhD)

Lee Jih-chu (Chinese: 李紀珠; pinyin: Lǐ Jìzhū; born 22 April 1960), also known by her English name Catherine Lee, is a Taiwanese economist and politician. She chaired the National Youth Commission from 1998 to 2000. After stepping down, Lee taught at National Chengchi University. Between 2005 and 2008, she was a member of the Legislative Yuan. Later that year, Lee became vice chairwoman of the Financial Supervisory Commission, where she served until 2013. Since leaving the central government, Lee has led the Bank of Taiwan and its parent company Taiwan Financial Holdings Group. In 2016, Lee was named vice chairwoman of Shin Kong Financial Holding Co., Ltd., a division of the Shin Kong Group.

== Early life and education ==
Lee was born on April 22, 1960, in Yilan County to Catholic parents. She graduated from National Chengchi University in 1982 with a bachelor's degree in economics. She then earned a master's degree in economics from National Taiwan University and her Ph.D. in economics from the university in 1986. Her doctoral dissertation, completed under economists Chen Zhaonan and Yu Tzong-shian, was titled, "A Study of Optimal Currency Basket Weights" (Chinese: 最適通貨籃權數之硏究).

== Academic career ==
After earning her doctorate at age 26, Lee became an associate professor of economics at National Chengchi University, where she was eventually promoted to a full professorship in 1993. In 1989 and 1997, she won a Fulbright Fellowship and an Eisenhower Fellowship to study economics in the United States as a visiting scholar at Harvard University and Stanford University, respectively. She also was a visiting professor of international finance at Johns Hopkins University, and also held visiting professorships at Peking University and Tsinghua University.

== Political career ==
Lee led the National Youth Commission from 1998 to 2000. Upon stepping down, she joined the faculty of National Chengchi University, where she taught finance and economics. Lee placed third on the Kuomintang party list and was elected as an at-large legislator via proportional representation in December 2004. In August 2005, she was elected to the KMT Central Committee. Lee contested a second central committee election in 2006, and won. Lee received early support from a coalition of civic groups and retained her legislative seat in 2008, again via proportional representation. Later that year, Lee left the Legislative Yuan and was appointed vice chairperson of the Financial Supervisory Commission. In May 2010, it was reported that Lee would be reassigned to a state-owned enterprise, but she remained at the FSC and was reappointed to another term as vice chair in June 2012. Lee left the FSC in February 2013, assuming the leadership of the Chunghwa Post. Six months later, the Ministry of Finance named Lee chairperson of Taiwan Financial Holdings Group. By 2014, Lee was concurrently serving as leader of the Bankers’ Association of the Republic of China. In August 2016, Lee was named president of Shin Kong Financial Holding Co., Ltd., and won election to its board of directors in June 2017.
