= Huang Teh-fu =

Taiwanese political scientist and politician

- 黃德福

Member of the Legislative Yuan
- In office 1 February 2002 – 31 January 2008
- Constituency: Republic of China

Chairperson of the National Youth Commission
- In office 10 March 1997 – 9 February 1998
- Preceded by: Wu Huan-lan
- Succeeded by: Lee Jih-chu

Personal details
- Born: 3 August 1954 (age 71) Taipei, Taiwan
- Party: Kuomintang
- Education: National Chengchi University (BA, MA); Northwestern University (PhD)

Huang Teh-fu (Chinese: 黃德福; pinyin: Huáng Défú; born 3 August 1954) is a Taiwanese political scientist and politician who served in the Legislative Yuan from 2002 to 2008.

== Education and early career ==
Huang graduated from National Chengchi University with a bachelor's degree and a master's degree in political science. He then completed doctoral studies in the United States, where he earned his Ph.D. in political science from Northwestern University in 1987 under professor Kenneth Janda. His doctoral dissertation was titled, "Party Ideologies, Interest Representation, and National Development: Covariance Structure and Regression Analyses of Cross-national Data".

Upon returning to Taiwan, Huang joined the faculty of NCCU. In 2000, Huang proposed that several party positions be directly elected. The implementation of Huang's reforms resulted in the first direct election for Kuomintang chairman held in March 2001.

== Political career ==
Huang led the National Youth Commission from March 1997 to February 1998. In 2001, he was elected to the Legislative Yuan for the first time. During his first term as a legislator, Huang supported the passage of sunshine laws, and backed the renaming of Chiang Kai-shek Memorial Hall to Presidents' Memorial Hall. He was a strong proponent for the use of absentee ballots. By mid-2004, Huang was the deputy whip for the Kuomintang legislative caucus, and was promoted at the start of the legislative session that began in July.

After the Central Election Commission announced that the 2004 general elections were scheduled for 11 December, Huang led criticism of the CEC, stating that the commission's decision favored the Democratic Progressive Party because the chosen election date was near the 25th anniversary of the 1979 Kaohsiung Incident. The Kuomintang announced that Huang ranked eighth on its party list in September 2004. Shortly after his reelection, Huang stepped down as caucus whip. Upon the conclusion of Huang's second term in the legislature, he was named executive director of the Foundation for Democracy, despite opposition from the leadership of the group, some of whom subsequently resigned from the organization.
