= National Youth Commission =

National Youth Commission can refer to:

- National Youth Commission (Philippines)
- Youth Development Administration in Taiwan, the National Youth Commission until 2013.
