= Compassion International Ghana =

Christian Non-Profit Organization

- Language: Multilingual
- Official website: https://www.compassion.com/about/where/ghana-facts.htm

Compassion International Ghana is a Christian non-governmental organisation (NGO) that seeks to transform the lives of children living in extreme poverty.

Compassion International Ghana is a Chapter of Compassion International (CI) a para-church organization.

== Background ==
Compassion International Ghana is part of a global network under Compassion International, headquartered in Colorado Springs, USA. The organization operates in 29 countries worldwide, including 10 across Africa.

Currently, CIGH operates through initiatives in Health (Survival and Early Childhood, Adolescent Reproductive Health, WaSH), Disaster Relief, Livelihood Empowerment (Agriculture, Savings Group Intervention, Unconditional Cash Transfers UCTs, Income Generated Activities, Relief distribution), Youth Development (Entrepreneurship, Mentorship, Agency & Leadership), Child Protection & Safeguarding, Education & Faith (Literacy intervention, Educational support, spiritual formation & discipleship), and Environmental Stewardship.
