= Sho-Chieh Tsiang =

Chinese-American economist

Tsiang Sho-Chieh
- 蔣碩傑
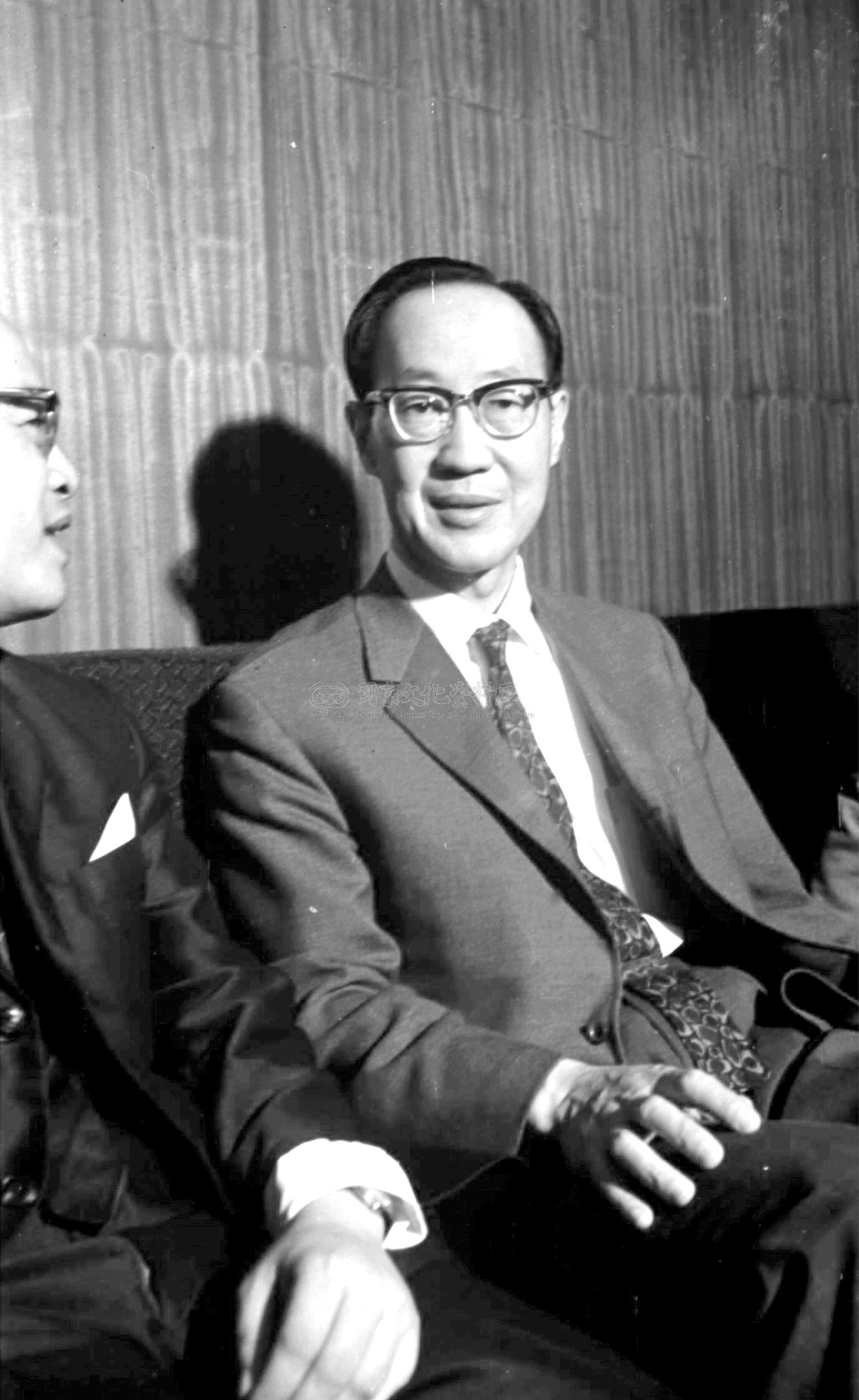
- Born: August 25, 1918; Shanghai, Republic of China
- Died: October 21, 1993 (aged 75); Chicago, United States
- Citizenship: United States
- Education: London School of Economics (BSc, PhD)
- Scientific career
- Fields: Economics
- Institutions: Peking University (1946–1948); National Taiwan University (1948–1949); IMF; University of Rochester (1960–1969); Cornell University (1969–1976); TIER (1976–1980); CIER (1980–1993)

Sho-Chieh Tsiang (traditional Chinese: 蔣碩傑; simplified Chinese: 蒋硕杰; pinyin: Jiǎng Shuòjié; August 25, 1918 – October 21, 1993) was a Chinese-American economist. He was born in China but resided primarily in the United States from 1949 until his death. He also resided in Taiwan in 1948 and in the 1980s.

He was the father-in-law of Lars Peter Hansen (2013 Nobel Prize in Economics laureate).

== Life and career ==
He studied at Keio University and the London School of Economics (B.Sc. Economics 1941, Ph.D. Economics 1945) under Friedrich Hayek and received the Hutchinson Silver Medal 1944–45. He served as Professor of Economics at National Peking University, 1946–48, staff economist at the International Monetary Fund, member of Academia Sinica, and Professor of Economics at University of Rochester and Cornell University. He was founding director of the Chung-Hwa Institute for Economic Research, serving from 1981 until his resignation in 1993 due to illness.

Tsiang's academic contributions include work on the demand for money, monetary theoretic foundations of the monetary approach to the balance of payments, an early statement of the relation between spot and forward exchange rates, and the role of money in trade balance stability. However, together with his lifelong friend and colleague Ta-Chung Liu, also a professor at Cornell University, gave practical advice to the Republic of China on economic policy. Together they advocated against central planning and for creating an environment that encouraged private enterprises to compete on world markets. They were able to convince members of the government, such as Economic Minister, Kwoh-Ting Li of the soundness of their views. Their advice was implemented, beginning with foreign exchange reform in beginning in 1958. Tsiang advocated the unification of multiple exchange rates and the devaluation of the New Taiwan dollar from artificially overvalued levels. Understanding that Taiwan at that time had cheap labor relative to the world market, he advocated for a liberalization of interest rate and exchange controls to promote savings and produce funds for investment for small enterprises, and proposed low tariffs to encourage exports. In this way, Taiwan could exploit its comparative advantage in labor-intensive goods on the world market. This was counter to prevailing policy recommendations by economists of the day, for whom "import substitution" was a common policy prescription where subsidization of domestic heavy industry was seen as a fast track to modernization. He also wrote for the public audience in Taiwan, engaging in lively public debates while director of the Taiwan Institute for Economic Research and later, the Chung-Hua Institution for Economic Research.

== Selected writings ==
- Tsiang, S.C. 1947. The Variations of Real Wages and Profit Margins in Relation to the Trade Cycle. Pitman.
- Tsiang, S.C. "The 1951 improvement in the Danish balance of payments." IMF Staff Papers, vol. 3, 1953, pp. 155–170
- Tsiang, S.C. "Liquidity preference and loanable funds theories, multiplier and velocity analysises: a synthesis," American Economic Review, vol. 46, 1956, pp. 539–64.
- Tsiang, S.C. "The Theory of Forward Exchange and Effects of Government Intervention on the Forward Exchange Market", 1959, IMF Staff Papers.
- Tsiang, S.C. "The Role of Money in Trade-Balance Stability: Synthesis of the Elasticity and Absorption Approaches", 1961, American Economic Review, vol. 51, 1961, pp. 912–936.
- Tsiang, S.C. "A Model of Economic Growth in Rostovian Stages", Econometrica, vol. 32, 1964, pp. 619–648.
- Tsiang, S.C. "Walras' Law, Say's Law and Liquidity Preference in General Equilibrium Analysis", International Economic Review, vol. 7, 1966, pp. 329–345.
- Tsiang, S.C. "The Precautionary Demand for Money: an Inventory Theoretical Approach", Journal of Political Economy, vol. 76, 1968.
- Feldstein, M.S. and Tsiang, S.C. "The Interest Rate, Taxation, and the Personal Savings Incentive", Quarterly Journal of Economics vol. 82, 1968, pp. 419–434.
- Tsiang, S.C. "A Critical Note on the Optimum Supply of Money", Journal of Money, Credit and Banking, vol. 1, 1969, pp. 266–280.
- Tsiang, S.C. "The Rationale of the Mean-Standard Deviation Analysis, Skewness Preference, and the Demand for Money", American Economic Review, vol. 62, 1972, pp. 354–371.
- Tsiang, S.C. "Risk, Return, and Portfolio Analysis: Comment", Journal of Political Economy, vol. 81, 1973, pp. 748–752.
- Tsiang, S.C. "The Dynamics of International Capital Flows and Internal and External Balance", Quarterly Journal of Economics, vol. 89, 1975, pp. 195–214.
- Tsiang, S.C. "The Monetary Theoretic Foundation of the Modern Monetary Approach to the Balance of Payments", Oxford Economic Papers, vol. 29, 1977, pp. 319–338.
- Tsiang, S.C. "Fashions and Misconceptions in Monetary Theory and Their Influences on Financial and Banking Policies", Zeitschrift furGesamte Staatswissenschaft, vol. 135, 1979, pp. 594–604.
- Tsiang, S.C. "Keynes's 'Finance' Demand for Liquidity, Robertson's Loanable Funds Theory, and Friedman's Monetarism", Quarterly Journal of Economics, vol. 94, 1980, pp. 467–491.
- Tsiang, S.C. "Taiwan's economic miracle: lessons in economic development," in A.C. Harberger, editor, "World Economic Growth; Case Studies of Developed and Developing Countries," Institute for Contemporary Studies, San Francisco, CA, 1984.
