= Sam Radwan =

Sam H. Radwan
- Born: Sam Radwan; Cairo, Egypt
- Occupations: Partner and co-founder of ENHANCE International LLC
- Website: http://www.enhance-international.com/

Sam Radwan is a partner and co-founder of ENHANCE International LLC, a management consultancy. He advises financial services CEOs in the Greater China region on growth strategies and Cross-Strait expansion and has published and been quoted in articles on this topic in Bloomberg Businessweek , The Wall Street Journal , The Economist, Financial Times and A. M. Best's Best Review. He has interviewed financial services regulators including Sean Chen (politician), the Premier of Taiwan, when he was the Chairman of the Financial Supervisory Commission (Republic of China) of Taiwan and negotiating the financial Memorandum of Understanding with China.
