= Thomas Huang (disambiguation) =

Thomas Huang (1936–2020) was a Chinese-born American electrical engineer and computer scientist. The name may also refer to:

- Huang Ta-chou (born 1936), Taiwanese politician, mayor of Taipei from 1990 to 1994
- Huang Tien-mu, Taiwanese politician, chair of the Financial Supervisory Commission in 2016 and since 2020
