= Chen Yuh-chang =

- 陳裕璋
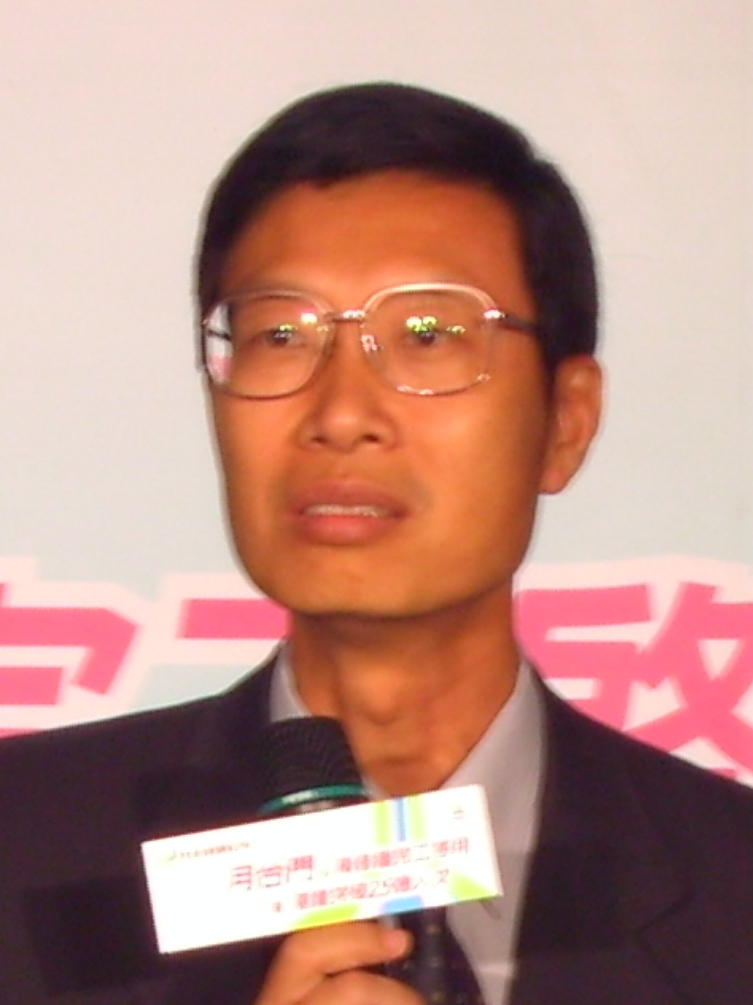

Chairperson of the Financial Supervisory Commission of the Republic of China
- In office 17 May 2010 – 29 July 2013
- Vice: Lee Jih-chu; Wang Li-ling; Wu Tang-chieh
- Preceded by: Sean Chen
- Succeeded by: Tseng Ming-chung

Deputy Mayor of Taipei
- In office 2006–2006
- Mayor: Ma Ying-jeou

Personal details
- Born: 18 September 1955 (age 70) Taiwan
- Party: Kuomintang
- Education: National Taiwan University (BA, MBA)

Chen Yuh-chang (Chinese: 陳裕璋; pinyin: Chén Yùzhāng; born 18 September 1955) is a Taiwanese politician and businessman. He was the Chairperson of the Financial Supervisory Commission (FSC) of the Executive Yuan from 2010 to 2013.

== Education ==
Chen graduated from National Taiwan University with a bachelor's degree in commerce and later earned a Master of Business Administration (M.B.A.) degree from the university.

== Financial Supervisory Commission Chairmanship ==
=== Day trader requirements ===
At the end of May 2013, Chen said that the FSC planned to establish regulations to impose margin requirements for day or pattern traders to ensure a form of safeguard against risk associated with day trading, as, he claimed, had been done by most of the developed countries around the world.

== Publications ==
- A Study of the Computerization of the Security and Stock Market
- A Study of the Clearance Systems of the Security and Stock Market
