= Jennifer Wang =

Jennifer Wang may refer to the following people:

- Wang Ju-hsuan, Taiwanese politician, Minister of Labor from 2008 to 2012, and 2016 vice presidential candidate
- Wang Li-ling, Taiwanese politician, chair of the Financial Supervisory Commission in 2016
