= President Chen =

President Chen may refer to:

- Chen Cheng (1898–1965), 5th President of Executive Yuan of the Republic of China
- Chen Chien-jen (born 1951), 31st President of the Executive Yuan of the Republic of China
- Chen Shui-bian (born 1950), 5th President of the Republic of China
- Sean Chen (politician) (born 1949), 24th President of Executive Yuan of the Republic of China

== See also ==
- Chen (surname)
- Trần Văn Hương (陳文香, pinyin: Chén Wénxiāng, 1902–1982), 3rd President of South Vietnam
