= Mai Chao-cheng =

Taiwanese economist (died 2019)

- 麥朝成
- Died: 6 March 2019 (aged 77–78)
- Education: National Taiwan University (BA, MA); University of Rochester (MA); Texas A&M University (PhD)
- Occupation: Economist
- Scientific career
- Fields: Economics
- Thesis: Aspects of plant location theory under conditions of uncertainty (1976)

Mai Chao-cheng (Chinese: 麥朝成; 1941/1942 – 6 March 2019) was a Taiwanese economist. He was a distinguished professor of Tamkang University and served as an advisor to President Chen Shui-bian. He was elected an academician of Academia Sinica in 1994.

== Biography ==
Mai studied at National Taiwan University, where he earned his B.A. in 1966 and his M.A. in 1970. He continued his studies in the United States, earning another M.A. from the University of Rochester in 1973 and his Ph.D. in economics from Texas A&M University in 1976. His doctoral dissertation was titled, "Aspects of plant location theory under conditions of uncertainty".

After returning to Taiwan, he taught at National Chengchi University from 1976–80, and was a joint appointment professor at National Taiwan University from 1979 to 1999. He was a visiting scholar at Harvard–Yenching Institute from 1981-82. Mai served as Director of Sun Yat-sen Institute for Social Sciences of Academia Sinica from 1987–93, and as President of Chung-Hua Institution for Economic Research from 1996 to 2002. He was also Distinguished Chair Professor in the Department of Industrial Economics of Tamkang University. He was elected an academician of Academia Sinica in 1994.

During the 1997 Asian financial crisis, Mai analyzed the financial situation of Taiwan and proposed policy measures to minimize economic impact of the crisis. In 2000, he was appointed a policy advisor to Chen Shui-bian, President of the Republic of China.

Mai died on 6 March 2019, aged 77.
