= Ta-Chung Liu =

Chinese-American economist (1914–1975)

- 劉大中
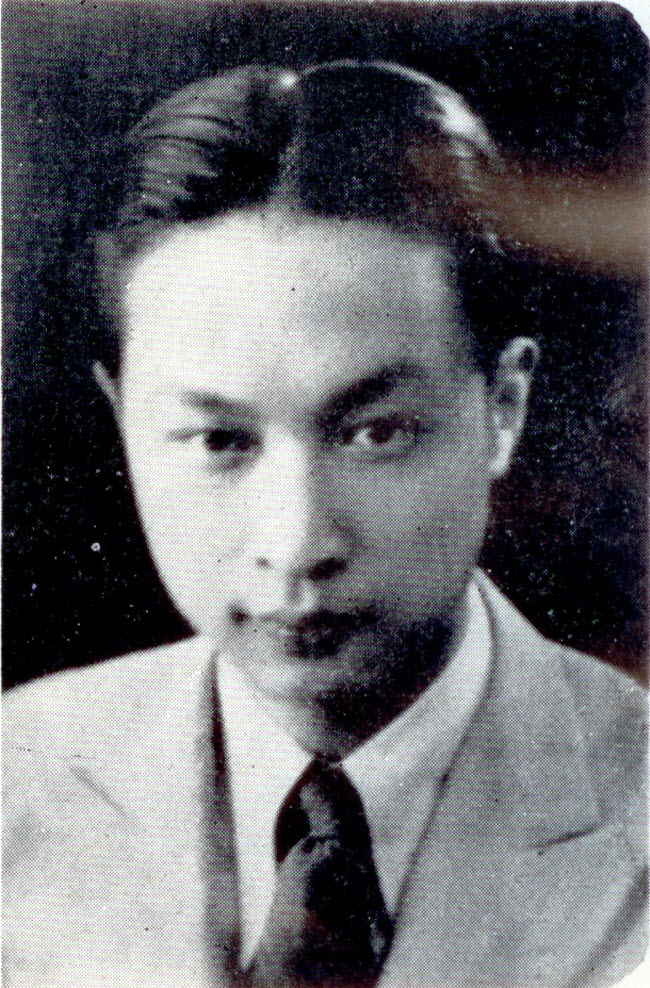
- Born: October 27, 1914; Peking, China
- Died: August 14, 1975 (aged 60); Ithaca, New York, U.S.
- Education: Cornell University (PhD)
- Scientific career
- Fields: Econometrics
- Workplaces: Johns Hopkins University; Cornell University
- Doctoral advisor: Donald English
- Doctoral students: Robert F. Engle

Ta-Chung Liu (Chinese: 劉大中; October 27, 1914 – August 14, 1975) was a Chinese American economist and econometrician. He was a professor of economics at Johns Hopkins University and Cornell University. During his time at Cornell, he mentored Robert F. Engle, an econometrician who later won the Nobel Prize in Economics.

He was also an influential advisor to the Taiwanese government on economic policy. He was awarded the Order of Brilliant Star, second rank, for his contributions to the country's development.

== Biography ==
Born in Peking on October 27, 1914, he earned a degree in civil engineering from the Chiao Tung University in 1936. He initially went to Cornell University to study railway engineering. Influenced by Fritz Machlup, he switched to economics. Liu earned a PhD degree in 1940 under Donald English. His dissertation was titled A Study in the Theory of Planning by the Individual Firm under Dynamic Conditions.

In 1947 he went back to Peking to work as professor of economics at National Tsing Hua University. He left China again in 1948 to avoid the communist revolution and Chinese Civil war.

He was a lecturer at Johns Hopkins University until 1958.

In the 1950s and 60s, Liu criticized the "Cowles Commission method" of structural equation modelling and advocated reduced form estimation instead, foreshadowing Christopher Sims' VAR method of 1980.

Both Liu and his wife committed suicide in 1975. He died at the Tompkins County Hospital in Ithaca, New York on August 14, 1975. A book, Quantitative Economics and Development: Essays in Memory of Ta-Chung Liu, was published in his honor by his colleagues.

== Taiwanese economics ==
Liu had a close working relationship with the government of Taiwan, and high ranking members of politics consulted him on economic policy. He served for several years as President Chiang Kai-shek's chief economic adviser in the 1960s. Together with his colleague at Cornell Sho-Chieh Tsiang, he advocated against central planning and for creating an environment that encouraged private enterprises to compete on world markets.

Liu took a leave from Cornell University in the 1969 academic year to serve as chairman of the Commission for Tax Reform for the Taiwanese Government.

He also helped establish the first PhD program in Economics at National Taiwan University.

== Works ==
=== Books ===
- Analysis of stresses in railway track, 1937
- Manufacturing Production Functions in the United States (with George H. Hildebrand), 1957
- The Economy of the Chinese Mainland (with Kung Chia Yeh)
- Economic Trends in Communist China
