= Consumer Protection Committee =

Agency of the Executive Yuan of Taiwan

- 行政院消費者保護會

Agency overview
- Formed: 1 July 1994 (as Consumer Protection Commission); 1 January 2012 (as Consumer Protection Committee)
- Jurisdiction: Republic of China
- Headquarters: Zhongzheng, Taipei
- Agency executive: Liu Chin-fang, chairman
- Parent agency: Executive Yuan
- Website: www.cpc.ey.gov.tw

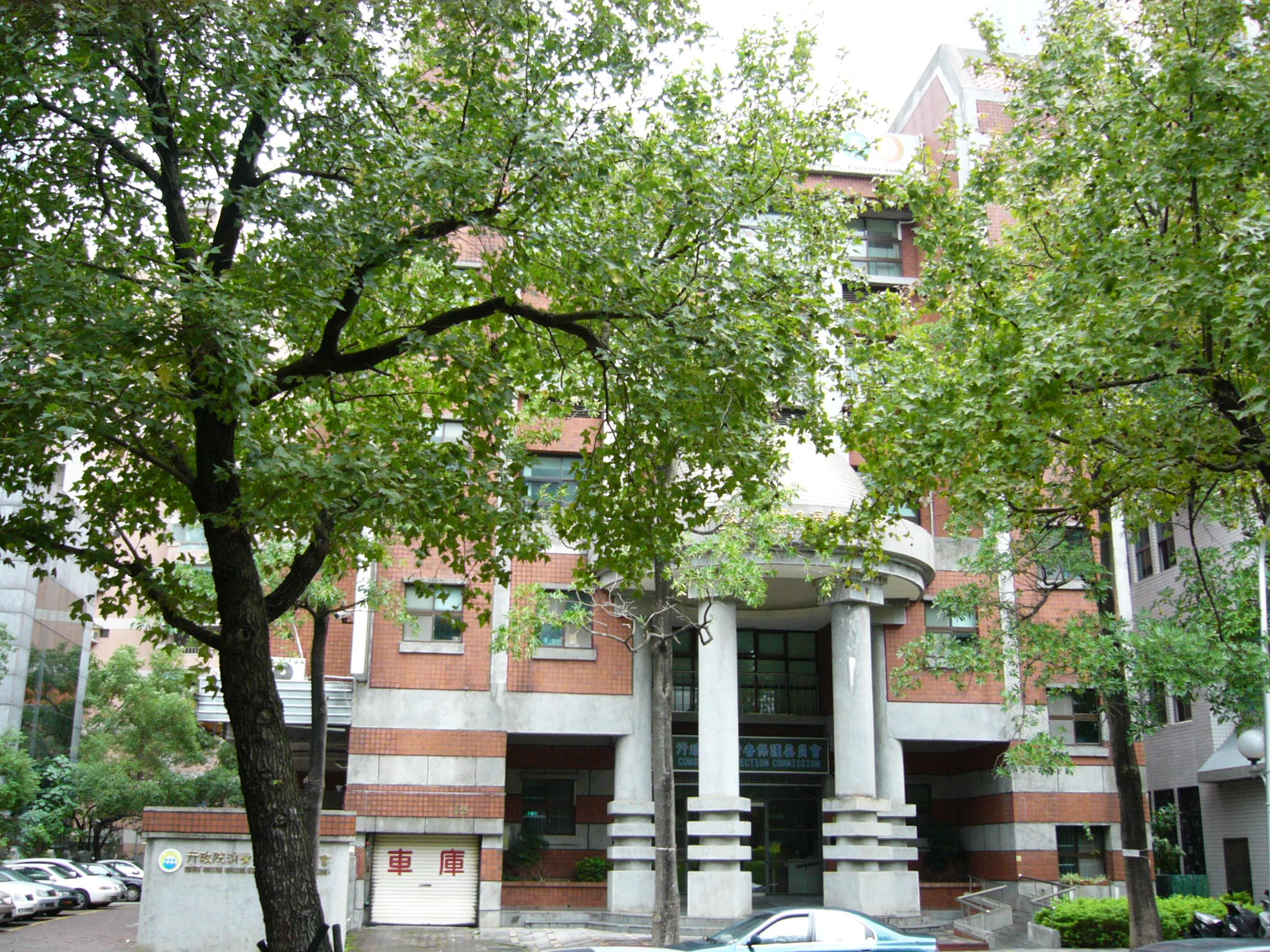
The Consumer Protection Committee

The Consumer Protection Committee (CPC; Chinese: 行政院消費者保護會; pinyin: Xíngzhèngyuàn Xiāofèizhě Bǎohùhuì) is the agency of the Executive Yuan of Taiwan (ROC) which is responsible for consultation, discussion, and review of important consumer protection policies, laws and regulations, mechanisms, and enforcement outcomes, as well as cross-agency coordination in Taiwan.

== History ==
The CPC was originally created on 1 July 1994 as the Consumer Protection Commission. On 1 January 2012, it was restructured as the Consumer Protection Committee.

== Organization ==
The CPC composition is made up of 17 to 27 members with terms of 2 years. The Vice President of the Executive Yuan chairs the CPC, and the members include officials of relevant government agencies, representatives of national consumer protection groups, representatives of nationwide business associations, experts and scholars. The committee meets once each month, but the chairperson has the right to convene unscheduled meetings when necessary.

Its operative unit is the Department of Consumer Protection.

== List of Chairpersons ==
Chairpersons of the Consumer Protection Commission

- Hsu Li-teh (27 February 1993 – 1 September 1997)
- Chiang Hsiao-yen (1 September 1997 – 11 December 1997)
- Liu Chao-shiuan (11 December 1997 – 20 May 2000)
- Yu Shyi-kun (20 May 2000 – 27 July 2000)
- Chang Chun-hsiung (27 July 2000 – 6 October 2000)
- Lai In-jaw (6 October 2000 – 1 February 2002)
- Lin Hsin-i (1 February 2002 – 20 May 2004)
- Yeh Chu-lan (20 May 2004 – 1 February 2005)
- Wu Rong-i (1 February 2005 – 25 January 2006)
- Tsai Ing-wen (25 January 2006 – 21 May 2007)
- Chiou I-jen (21 May 2007 – 6 May 2008)
- Chang Chun-hsiung (6 May 2008 – 20 May 2008; acting)
- Paul Chiu (20 May 2008 – 10 September 2009)
- Eric Chu (10 September 2009 – 17 May 2010)
- Sean Chen (17 May 2010 – 31 December 2011)

Chairpersons of the Consumer Protection Committee

- Liu Chin-fang (since 1 January 2012)

== See also ==
- Consumer Protection
- Executive Yuan
