= Ding Kung-wha =

Taiwanese politician

- 丁克華
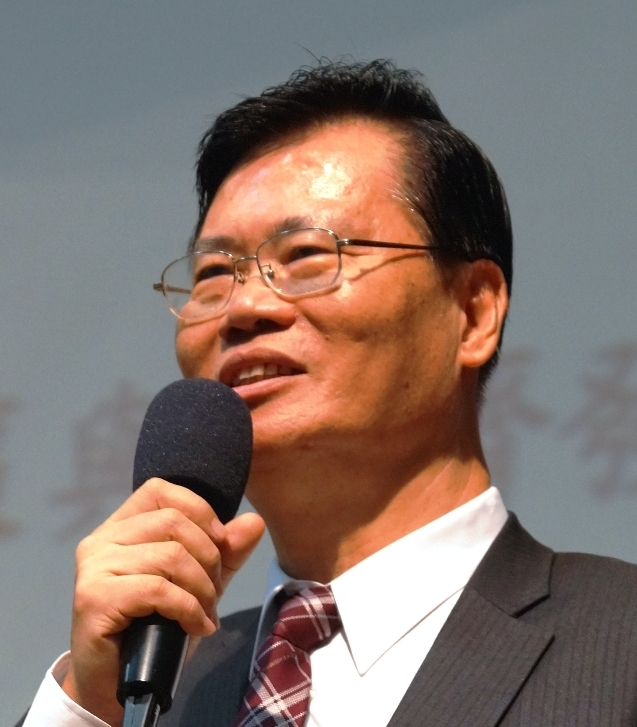

Chairperson of Financial Supervisory Commission
- In office 20 May 2016 – 3 October 2016
- Vice: Huang Tien-mu, Kuei Hsien-nung
- Preceded by: Wang Li-ling
- Succeeded by: Huang Tien-mu (acting); Lee Ruey-tsang

Personal details
- Born: 25 October 1953 (age 71) Taipei, Taiwan
- Political party: Independent
- Education: National Chung Hsing University (BA); National Chengchi University (MA)

Ding Kung-wha (Chinese: 丁克華; pinyin: Dīngkè huá; born 25 October 1953) is a Taiwanese politician who served as the Chairperson of Financial Supervisory Commission in 2016.

== Education ==
Ding obtained his bachelor's degree in public finance and taxation from National Chung Hsing University in 1976 and master's degree in public finance from National Chengchi University in 1978.

== Financial Supervisory Commission chairmanship ==
Ding assumed the Financial Supervisory Commission chairmanship on 20 May 2016, with the Tsai Ing-wen-appointed Lin Chuan cabinet. He resigned on 3 October, to take responsibility for a scandal involving Mega International Commercial Bank and Bai Chi Gan Tou Digital Entertainment Company's unsuccessful bid to merge with XPEC Entertainment.
