= Sean Chen (politician) =

Taiwanese politician

- 陳冲
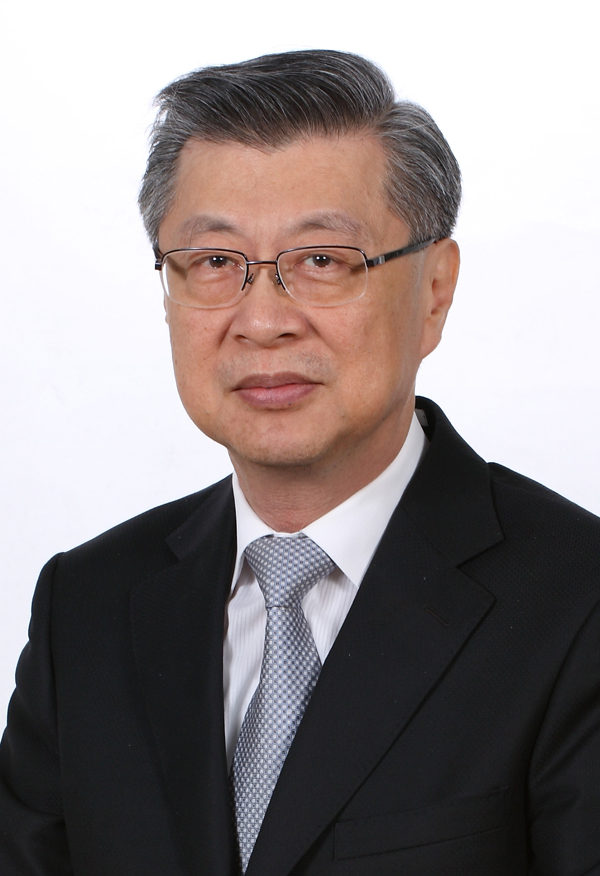

Premier of the Republic of China
- In office 6 February 2012 – 1 February 2013
- President: Ma Ying-jeou
- Vice Premier: Jiang Yi-huah
- Preceded by: Wu Den-yih
- Succeeded by: Jiang Yi-huah

Vice Premier of the Republic of China
- In office 17 May 2010 – 6 February 2012
- Premier: Wu Den-yih
- Preceded by: Eric Chu
- Succeeded by: Jiang Yi-huah

Minister of Consumer Protection Commission
- In office 17 May 2010 – 31 December 2011
- Premier: Wu Den-yih
- Preceded by: Eric Chu
- Succeeded by: Liu Chin-fang

Chairman of Financial Supervisory Commission
- In office 1 December 2008 – 17 May 2010
- Deputy: Catherine Lee
- Preceded by: Gordon Chen
- Succeeded by: Chen Yuh-chang

Deputy Minister of Finance
- In office 1998–2002
- Minister: Paul Chiu; Shea Jia-dong; Yen Ching-chang; Lee Yung-san

Personal details
- Born: 13 October 1949 (age 76) Taipei, Taiwan
- Party: Kuomintang
- Education: National Taiwan University (LLB, LLM); Goethe University Frankfurt

Chen Chun (Chinese: 陳冲; pinyin: Chén Chōng; born 13 October 1949), also known as Sean Chen in English, is a Taiwanese politician and lawyer who served as the premier of the Republic of China from 2012 to 2013.

== Early life and education ==
Chen was born in Taipei to a family of doctors. His father was a mechanical engineer.

After graduating from the Affiliated Senior High School of National Taiwan Normal University, Chen earned a Bachelor of Laws (LL.B.) in 1971 and a Master of Laws (LL.M.) in 1973 from National Taiwan University. He also studied law in Germany at Goethe University Frankfurt on a DAAD Fellowship from 1977 to 1978.

== Politics ==
=== FSC Chairmanship ===
Sean Chen's popularity grew in Taiwan when he was the chairman of the Financial Supervisory Commission who signed three memoranda of understanding with his mainland Chinese counter parties in January 2010 in the field of banking, insurance and investments. This was viewed as a major milestone in furthering economic ties with the Chinese, allowing Taiwanese financial institutions access to the mainland's vast and fast-growing markets. In a discussion with Sam Radwan that appeared in an article in Bloomberg Businessweek he showed confidence that he would be able to achieve preferential treatment for Taiwan in what is considered by many foreign financial services institutions to be a market where Chinese regulators have not provided a level playing field.

=== ROC Premiership ===
On 6 February 2012, Chen was appointed Premier of the Republic of China in succession to Wu Den-yih. After one year of economic challenges and considerable public criticism, he stepped down from his office on health grounds on 1 February 2013, to be replaced by the Vice Premier Jiang Yi-huah.

== Cross-strait relations ==
In March 2012, Chen gave his view on cross-strait relations at the Legislative Yuan. He agrees to the One-China policy, and that China is the Republic of China. Mainland China belongs to the same country as Taiwan area, but just not under the effective control of the ROC government.

== See also ==
- Premier of the Republic of China

Political offices
Preceded by Eric Chu	Vice Premier of the Republic of China; 2008–2012	Succeeded by Jiang Yi-huah
Preceded by Wu Den-yih	Premier of the Republic of China; 2012–2013	Succeeded by Jiang Yi-huah
