= Institute of Economics, Academia Sinica =

Taiwanese economic research organization

- 中央研究院經濟研究所
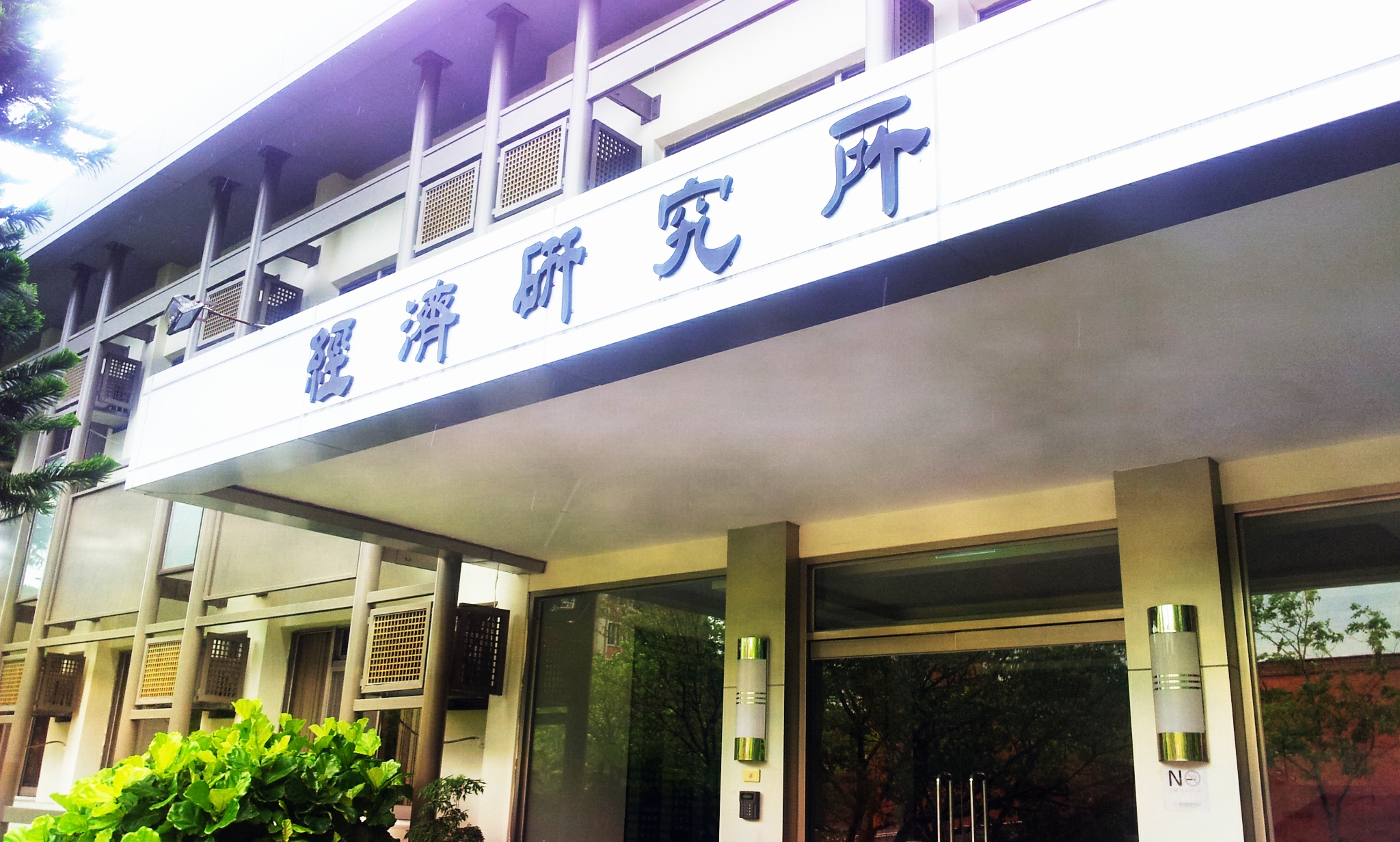

Agency overview
- Formed: October 1962
- Headquarters: Nangang, Taipei, Taiwan
- Agency executive: Kamhon Kan, Director
- Website: www.econ.sinica.edu.tw

Institute of Economics, Academia Sinica (IEAS; Chinese: 中央研究院經濟研究所; pinyin: Zhōngyāng Yánjiùyuàn Jīngjì Yánjiùsuǒ) is an economic research organization in Taiwan. Early in its history, it focused on local issues, and later expanded to explore more theoretical issues.

The institute offers a Ph.D. program in economics, which is designed to provide students with a strong foundation in economic theory, econometrics, and quantitative methods, and to prepare them for careers in academia, government, and the private sector.

== History ==
The organization was established in October 1962. In 1970, the organization began publishing Taiwan's first economic forecasting journal.

== Organizational structures ==
- Research Staff
- Recruiting Committee
- Editorial Board of Academia Economic Papers
- Editorial Board of Taiwan Economic Forecasts and Policy
- Committee on Academic Seminar Plans
- Library Committee
- Computer Committee
- Recreation Committee
- Administrative Staff

== Journals published by IEAS ==
- Taiwan Economic Forecasts and Policy - Founded in 1970
- Academia Economic Papers - Founded in 1973

== Directors ==
- Hsing Mu-huan
- Yu Tzong-shian
- Paul Liu
- Lee Yung-san
- Shea Jia-dong
- Hu Sheng-cheng
- Kuan Chung-ming
- Peng Shin-kun
- Kamhon Kan

== See also ==
- Academia Sinica
- Economy of Taiwan
- Taiwan Institute of Economic Research
- Chung-Hua Institution for Economic Research
