= Peng Jin-lung =

Taiwanese academic

- 彭金隆
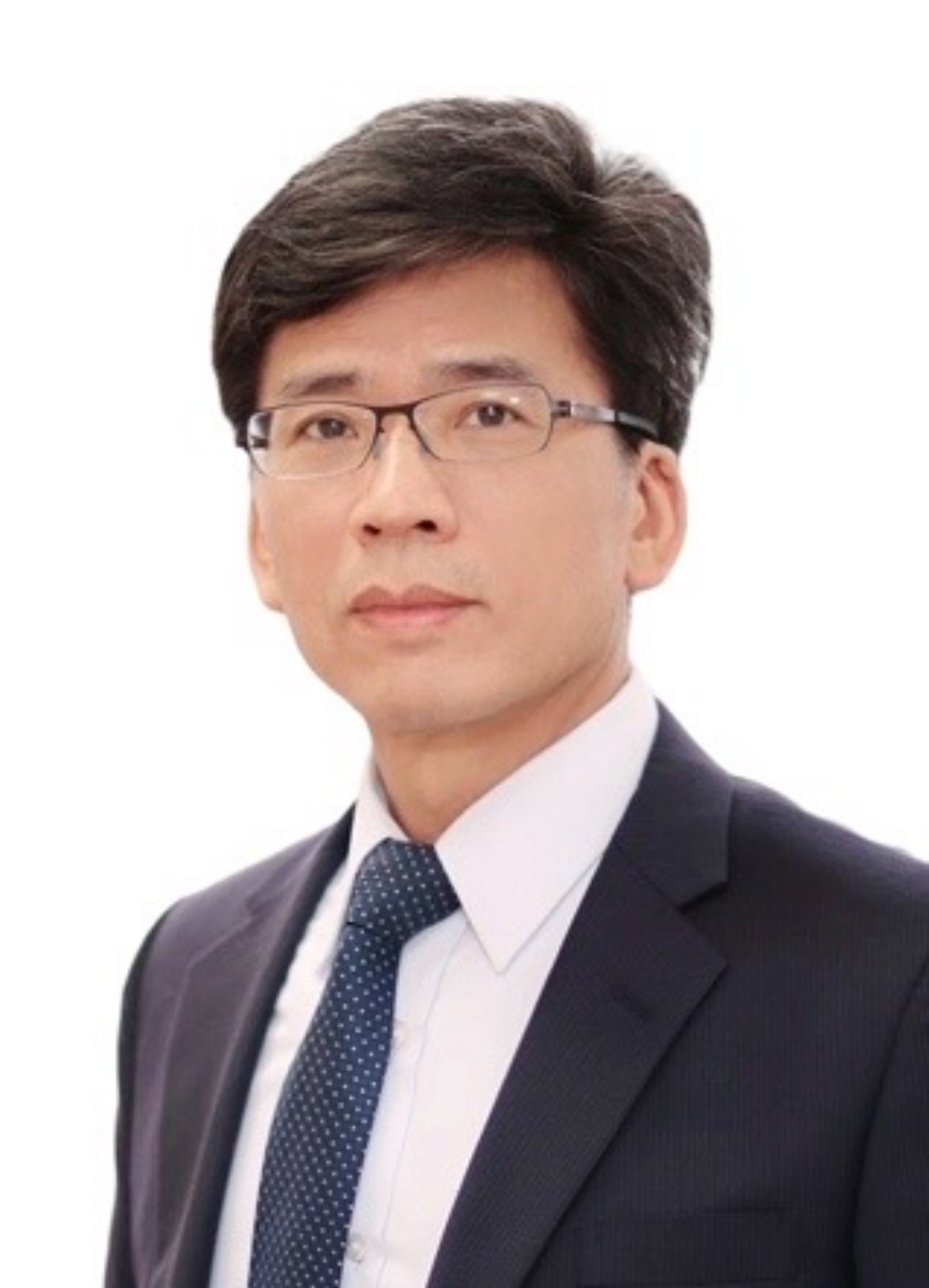

13th Chairman of the Financial Supervisory Commission
- Incumbent
- Assumed office 20 May 2024
- Prime Minister: Cho Jung-tai
- Preceded by: Huang Tien-mu

Personal details
- Born: 1 March 1965 (age 61) Zhudong, Hsinchu County, Taiwan
- Party: Independent
- Education: National Chengchi University (BA, MA, PhD)

Peng Jin-lung (Chinese: 彭金隆; pinyin: Péng Jīnlóng) is a Taiwanese financial analyst who has been chairman of the Financial Supervisory Commission since 2024.

Peng graduated from National Chengchi University with a bachelor's degree in accounting, a master's degree in risk management, and a Ph.D. in business administration. In the 2000s, Peng was a professor and chair of the risk management and insurance department at Shih Chien University. By 2011, he had joined the faculty of National Chengchi University. He remained a professor through 2019, and became chair of the NCCU Department of Risk Management and Insurance by 2020.

At the time of his appointment as chair of the Financial Supervisory Commission on 16 April 2024, Peng was associate dean of NCCU's College of Commerce.
