= Banking Bureau =

Government agency in Taiwan

- 銀行局

Agency overview
- Jurisdiction: Taiwan
- Headquarters: Banqiao, New Taipei; 25°00′51.6″N 121°27′50.0″E
- Agency executives: Chuang Hsou-yuan, Director-General; Lin Chih-chi, Tong Chen-chang, Deputy Director-Generals
- Parent agency: Financial Supervisory Commission
- Website: Official website

The Banking Bureau (traditional Chinese: 銀行局; simplified Chinese: 银行局; pinyin: Yínháng Jú) is a bureau of the Financial Supervisory Commission of Taiwan.

== Organizational structures ==
- Legal Affairs
- Domestic Banks
- Credit Cooperatives
- Trust and Bills Finance Co.
- Foreign Banks
- Financial Holdings Co.
- IT Office
- Accounting Office
- Secretary Office
- Statistics Office
- Personnel Office
- Ethics Office

== See also ==
- List of banks in Taiwan
