= Securities and Futures Bureau =

Government agency in Taiwan

- 金融監督管理委員會證券期貨局
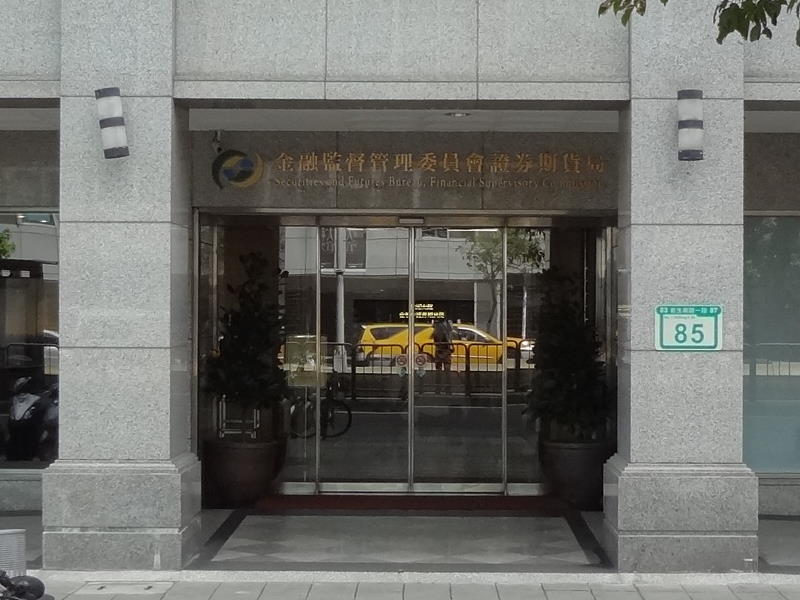

Agency overview
- Jurisdiction: Taiwan
- Headquarters: Da'an, Taipei, Taiwan; 25°02′30.4″N 121°31′59.2″E
- Agency executive: Chang Chen-shan, Director-General
- Website: Official website

The Securities and Futures Bureau (SFB; traditional Chinese: 金融監督管理委員會證券期貨局; simplified Chinese: 金融监督管理委员会证券期货局; pinyin: Jīnróng Jiāndū Guǎnlǐ Wěiyuánhuì Zhèngquàn Qīhuò Jú) is the agency of Financial Supervisory Commission of the Taiwan (ROC) that administers and supervises the securities issuance, securities trading and futures trading, facilitates national economic development, protects investors' interests and develops the futures market and maintains futures trading orders in Taiwan.

== Organizational structure ==
- Corporate Finance Division
- Securities Firms Division
- Securities Trading Division
- Securities Investment Trust and Consulting Division
- Accounting and Auditing Supervision Division
- Futures Trading Division
- Information Systems Office
- Personnel Office
- Accounting Office
- Civil Service Ethics Office

== Director-generals ==
- Lee Chi-hsien
- Huang Tien-mu
- Wu Yui-chun
- Wang Yung-hsin
- Chang Chen-shan

== Transportation ==
SFB is accessible within walking distance south of Zhongxiao Xinsheng Station of Taipei Metro.

== See also ==
- Financial Supervisory Commission (Taiwan)
- Economy of Taiwan
