= Shea Jia-dong =

Taiwanese economist

- 許嘉棟
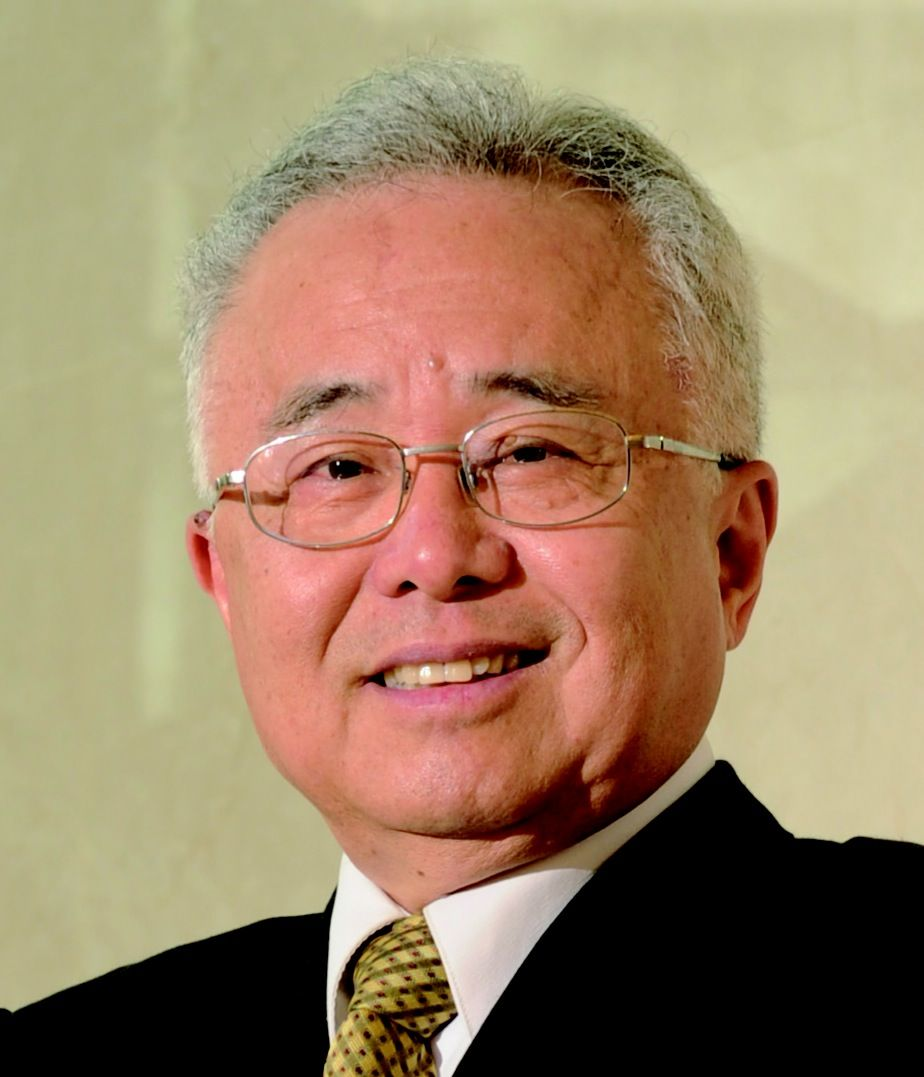

Minister of Finance of the Republic of China
- In office 20 May 2000 – 6 October 2000
- Preceded by: Paul Chiu
- Succeeded by: Yen Ching-chang

Personal details
- Born: 9 October 1948 (age 77) Tainan County, Taiwan
- Political party: Kuomintang
- Education: National Taiwan University (BA, MA); Stanford University (PhD)

Shea Jia-dong (Chinese: 許嘉棟; pinyin: Xǔ Jiādòng; born 9 October 1948) is a Taiwanese economist.

== Early life and education ==
Shea was born in Tainan County in 1948. After graduating from National Tainan First Senior High School, he enrolled in National Taiwan University and graduated with his bachelor's degree in economics in 1960 and his master's degree in economics in 1974. He then completed doctoral studies in the United States at Stanford University, where he earned his Ph.D. in economics in 1978. He initially studied international trade but switched to economics. His doctoral dissertation was titled, "The policy implications of the government budget constraint in an optimal accumulation model".

== Career ==
After finishing his doctoral degree, Shea went back to Taiwan to work for the Institute of Economics, where he was an associate research fellow from 1978 to 1982 and a research fellow from 1982 to 2000. Between 1996 and 2000, Shea served as deputy governor of the Central Bank of the Republic of China (Taiwan). Shea was named finance minister in April 2000, and stepped down in October.
