= Taiwan Institute of Economic Research =

Taiwanese research institute

Coordinates: 25°03′59″N 121°31′30″E

- 台灣經濟研究院
- Abbreviation: TIER
- Formation: 1 September 1976
- Founder: Koo Chen-fu
- Type: Research institute
- Headquarters: Zhongshan, Taipei, Taiwan
- President: Chang Chien-yi
- Website: tier.org.tw

Taiwan Institute of Economic Research (TIER, Chinese: 台灣經濟研究院; pinyin: Táiwān Jīngjì Yánjiùyuàn) is an incorporated non-profit research institute in Zhongshan District, Taipei, Taiwan.

== History ==
Established on 1 September 1976, it was the first independent academic research institute in Taiwan. Similar to the Chung-Hua Institution for Economic Research, its mission is to provide research into the domestic and foreign economies and industries and to provide the results to the government and industry for consideration, encouraging the development of Taiwan's economy. It is a major provider of economic information about Taiwan, greater China, and Asia, and also acts as one of two major economic policy think tanks in Taiwan. Funding is provided through an endowment, donations, as well as income generated from research publications.

TIER is a major participant in the Pacific Basin Economic Council (PBEC), Pacific Economic Cooperation Council (PECC), Asia-Pacific Economic Cooperation (APEC), and the Pacific Trade and Development Conference (PAFTAD).

== Organizational structure ==
- Board of Directors
- President, Vice President, Chief Operating Officer
  - Office of the President
    - Secretariat of Industrial Development Advisory Council
    - Macroeconomic Forecasting Center
    - Chinese Industrial and Economic Research Center
    - Climate Change and Policy Response Research Center
    - Intellectual Property Valuation Service Center
    - Economic Development Strategic Planning Center
  - Research Division I
  - Research Division II
  - Research Division III
  - Research Division IV
  - Research Division V
  - Research Division VI
  - Research Division VII
  - Tokyo Office
  - Department of International Affairs
  - Department of Industrial Development
  - Taiwan Industry Economics Services
  - Survey and Statistics Center
  - Biotechnology Industry Study Center
  - Regional Development Research Center
  - Department of Administration
  - Department of Information Technology
  - Information Service Center
- Auditing Committee
- Advisory Committee

== Transportation ==
The institute is accessible within walking distance North from Zhongshan Elementary School Station of the Taipei Metro.

== See also ==
- Economy of Taiwan
- Chung-Hua Institution for Economic Research
- Institute of Economics, Academia Sinica
