= Huang Tien-mu =

Taiwanese politician

- 黃天牧
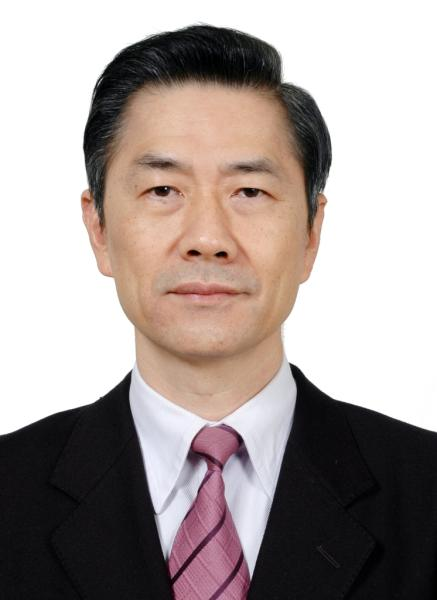
- Official portrait, 2016

12th Chairman of the Financial Supervisory Commission
- In office 20 May 2020 – May 20, 2024
- Prime Minister: Su Tseng-chang; Chen Chien-jen
- Preceded by: Wellington Koo
- Acting; 3 October 2016 – 19 October 2016
- Preceded by: Ding Kung-wha
- Succeeded by: Lee Ruey-tsang

Vice Chairman of the Financial Supervisory Commission
- In office 2 September 2013 – 19 May 2020
- Chairperson: See list: Tseng Ming-chung Wang Li-ling Ding Kung-wha Himself (acting) Lee Ruey-tsang Wellington Koo
- Preceded by: Wu Tang-chieh

Personal details
- Born: 5 August 1958 (age 67) Shilin, Yangmingshan Administrative Bureau, Taipei, Taiwan
- Party: Independent
- Parent: Huang Chao-li (father)
- Education: National Chengchi University (BA); National Sun Yat-sen University (MA); University of Southern California (PhD)

Huang Tien-mu (Chinese: 黃天牧; pinyin: Huáng Tiānmù; born 5 August 1958), also known by his English name Thomas Huang, is a Taiwanese financier. He was appointed chairman of the Financial Supervisory Commission in May 2020. He previously served as chairman of the agency in an acting capacity in 2016.

== Early life and education ==
Huang Tien-mu is also known as Thomas Huang. He earned a bachelor's degree in banking and finance from National Chengchi University in 1980, a master's degree from National Sun Yat-sen University (NSYSU) in 1984, and his Ph.D. in public administration from the University of Southern California in the United States in 1993. His doctoral dissertation was titled, "Privatizing public enterprises in developing countries: The case of Taiwan's government-owned banks".

== Political career ==
Huang began his public service career within the Ministry of Finance. He was director of the Bureau of Monetary Affairs fourth division, and later secretary-general, director, and deputy director of the Bureau of Monetary Affairs. He was subsequently named to a range of leadership roles within the Financial Supervisory Commission, serving the FSC Financial Examination Bureau as interim deputy director-general, the FSC itself as secretary-general, and the FSC's Insurance Bureau as director general.

In 2012, Huang was named director-general of the FSC's Bureau of Securities and Futures. He remained in that position through September 2013, when he was appointed to the FSC deputy chairmanship. He assumed the FSC chairmanship in an acting capacity in October 2016. Huang returned to the vice chairmanship when Lee Ruey-tsang was named head of the FSC. He also served under Lee's successor Wellington Koo. When Koo was appointed to the National Security Council in May 2020, Huang was promoted to lead the Financial Supervisory Commission.
