= Executive Yuan =

Executive branch of the government of the Republic of China

- 行政院
- Central government

Overview
- Established: 10 March 1950; 76 years ago
- Main organ: Executive Yuan Council
- Ministries: 14 ministries 9 councils
- Annual budget: $2.925 trillion NTD (2025)

Executive Yuan
- Chinese: 行政院
- Literal meaning: Executive Court
Transcriptions
Standard Mandarin
- Hanyu Pinyin: Xíngzhèng Yuàn
- Bopomofo: ㄒㄧㄥˊ ㄓㄥˋ ㄩㄢˋ
- Gwoyeu Romatzyh: Shynjenq Yuann
- Wade–Giles: Hsing^{2}-cheng^{4} Yüan^{4}
- Tongyong Pinyin: Síngjhèng Yuàn
- MPS2: Shíngjèng Yuàn
Hakka
- Romanization: Hàng-chṳn Yen
Southern Min
- Hokkien POJ: Hêng-chèng Īⁿ
- Tâi-lô: Hîng-tsìng Īnn

The Executive Yuan (Note: Chinese: 行政院; pinyin: Xíngzhèng Yuàn) (Note: Also referred to as the executive body by Mainland Chinese state-run media and government, as well as the Cabinet of Taiwan by local Taiwanese citizens and international media) is the executive branch of the government of the Republic of China, known commonly as Taiwan, which formerly ruled mainland China until 1949.

The Executive Yuan was founded in 1928. Under the amended constitution, the head of the Executive Yuan is the premier, who is positioned as the head of government and has the power to appoint members to serve in the cabinet, while the ROC president is the head of state under the semi-presidential system, who can appoint the premier and nominate the members of the cabinet. The premier may be removed by a vote of no-confidence by a majority of the Legislative Yuan, after which the president may either remove the premier or dissolve the Legislative Yuan and initiate a new election for legislators.

== Organization and structure ==
The Executive Yuan is headed by the premier and includes its vice premier, fourteen cabinet ministers, various chairpersons of commissions, and five to nine ministers without portfolio. The vice premier, ministers, and chairpersons are appointed by the President of the Republic of China on the recommendation of the premier.

Its formation, as one of five branches ("yuans") of the government, stemmed from the Three Principles of the People, the constitutional theory of Sun Yat-sen, but was adjusted constitutionally over the years to adapt to the situation in the ROC by changes in the laws and the Constitution of the Republic of China.

== Members ==
=== Leaders ===
| Name | | Leader |
| English name | Chinese | Leader |
|---|---|---|
| Premier | 院長 | Cho Jung-tai |
| Vice Premier | 副院長 | Cheng Li-chun |
| Secretary-General | 秘書長 | Chang Tun-han |

=== Ministries ===
| Name | | Minister |
| English name | Chinese | Minister |
|---|---|---|
| Interior | 內政部 | Liu Shyh-fang |
| Foreign Affairs | 外交部 | Lin Chia-lung |
| National Defense | 國防部 | Wellington Koo |
| Finance | 財政部 | Chuang Tsui-yun |
| Education | 教育部 | Cheng Ying-yao |
| Justice | 法務部 | Cheng Ming-chien |
| Economic Affairs | 經濟部 | J.W. Kuo |
| Transportation and Communications | 交通部 | Chen Shih-kai |
| Labor | 勞動部 | Hung Sun-han |
| Health and Welfare | 衛生福利部 | Chiu Tai-yuan |
| Culture | 文化部 | Li Yuan |
| Digital Affairs | 數位發展部 | Huang Yen-nun |
| Agriculture | 農業部 | Chen Junne-jih |
| Environment | 環境部 | Peng Chi-ming |
| Sports | 運動部 | Lee Yang |

=== Agencies ===
| Name | | Minister |
| English name | Chinese | Minister |
|---|---|---|
| National Development Council | 國家發展委員會 | Liu Jin-ching |
| National Science and Technology Council | 國家科學及技術委員會 | Wu Cheng-wen |
| Mainland Affairs Council | 大陸委員會 | Chiu Chui-cheng |
| Financial Supervisory Commission | 金融監督管理委員會 | Peng Jin-lung |
| Ocean Affairs Council | 海洋委員會 | Kuan Bi-ling |
| Overseas Community Affairs Council | 僑務委員會 | Hsu Chia-ching |
| Veterans Affairs Council | 國軍退除役官兵輔導委員會 | Yen Teh-fa |
| Council of Indigenous Peoples | 原住民族委員會 | Tseng Chih-yung |
| Hakka Affairs Council | 客家委員會 | Ku Hsiu-Fei |
| Public Construction Commission | 公共工程委員會 | Dereck Chen |
| National Palace Museum | 國立故宮博物院 | Hsiao Tsung-huang |
| Directorate-General of Budget, Accounting and Statistics | 主計總處 | Chen Shu-Tzu |
| Directorate-General of Personnel Administration | 人事行政總處 | Su Chun-jung |

==== Independent organs ====
The heads of these independent institutions under the Executive Yuan Council would not be affected by any change of the premier.

| Name | | Chair |
| English name | Chinese | Chair |
|---|---|---|
| Central Election Commission | 中央選舉委員會 | Lee Chin-yung |
| Fair Trade Commission | 公平交易委員會 | Lee Mei |
| National Communications Commission | 國家通訊傳播委員會 | Chen Yaw-shyang |
| Central Bank | 中央銀行 | Yang Chin-long |

=== Other roles ===
| Name | | Leader |
| English name | Chinese | Leader |
|---|---|---|
| Minister without Portfolio | 政務委員 | Chen Shih-chung |
| Minister without Portfolio | 政務委員 | Shih Che |
| Minister without Portfolio | 政務委員 | Derek Chen |
| Minister without Portfolio | 政務委員 | Yang Jen-ni |
| Minister without Portfolio | 政務委員 | Lin Min-hsin |
| Minister without Portfolio | 政務委員 | Chi Lien-cheng |
| Minister without Portfolio | 政務委員 | Liu Jin-ching |
| Minister without Portfolio | 政務委員 | Wu Cheng-wen |
| Spokesperson | 發言人 | Michelle Lee |

== Organizations no longer under Executive Yuan ==
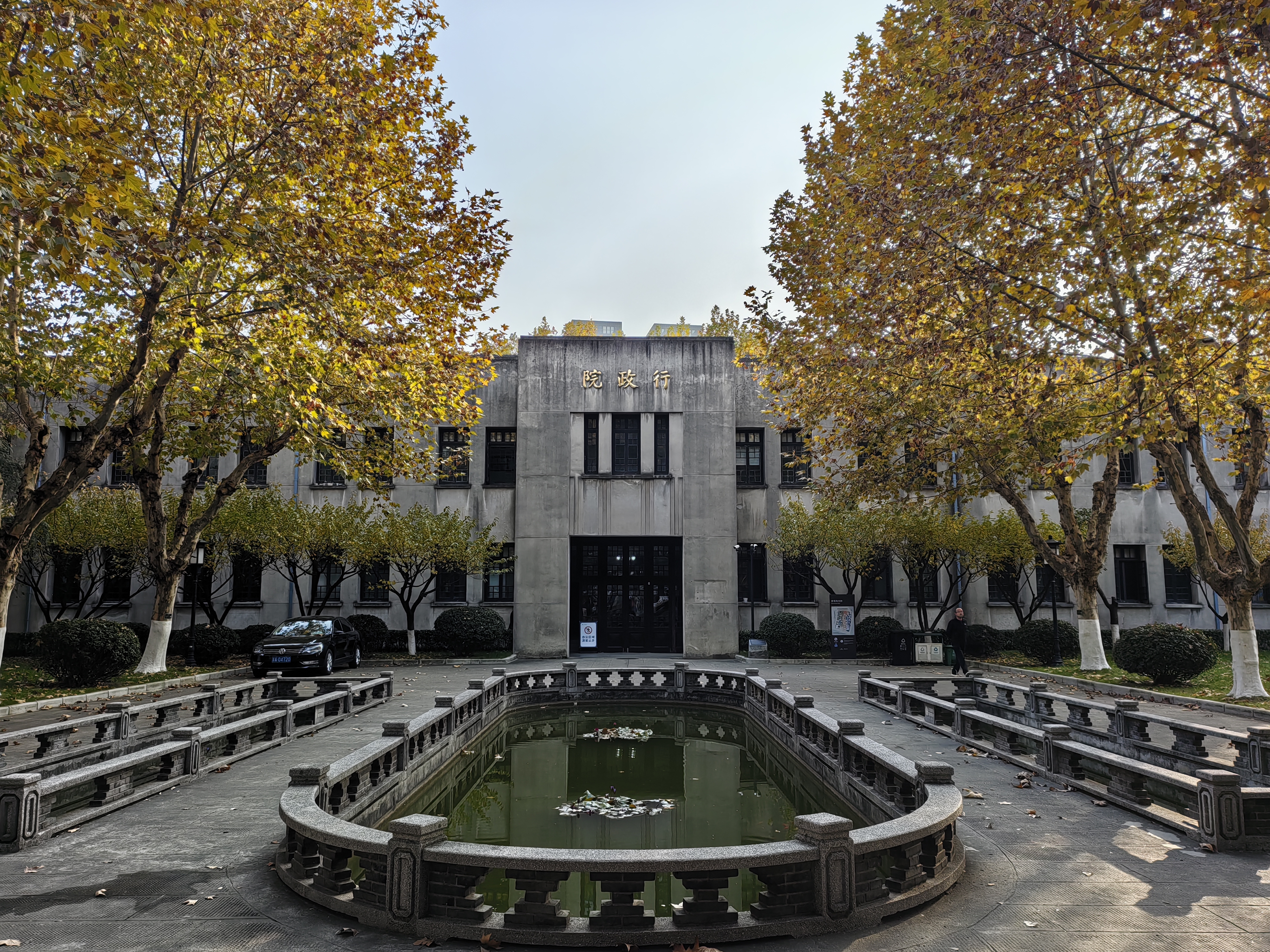
Former site of Executive Yuan in Presidential Palace Complex (1928–1937)

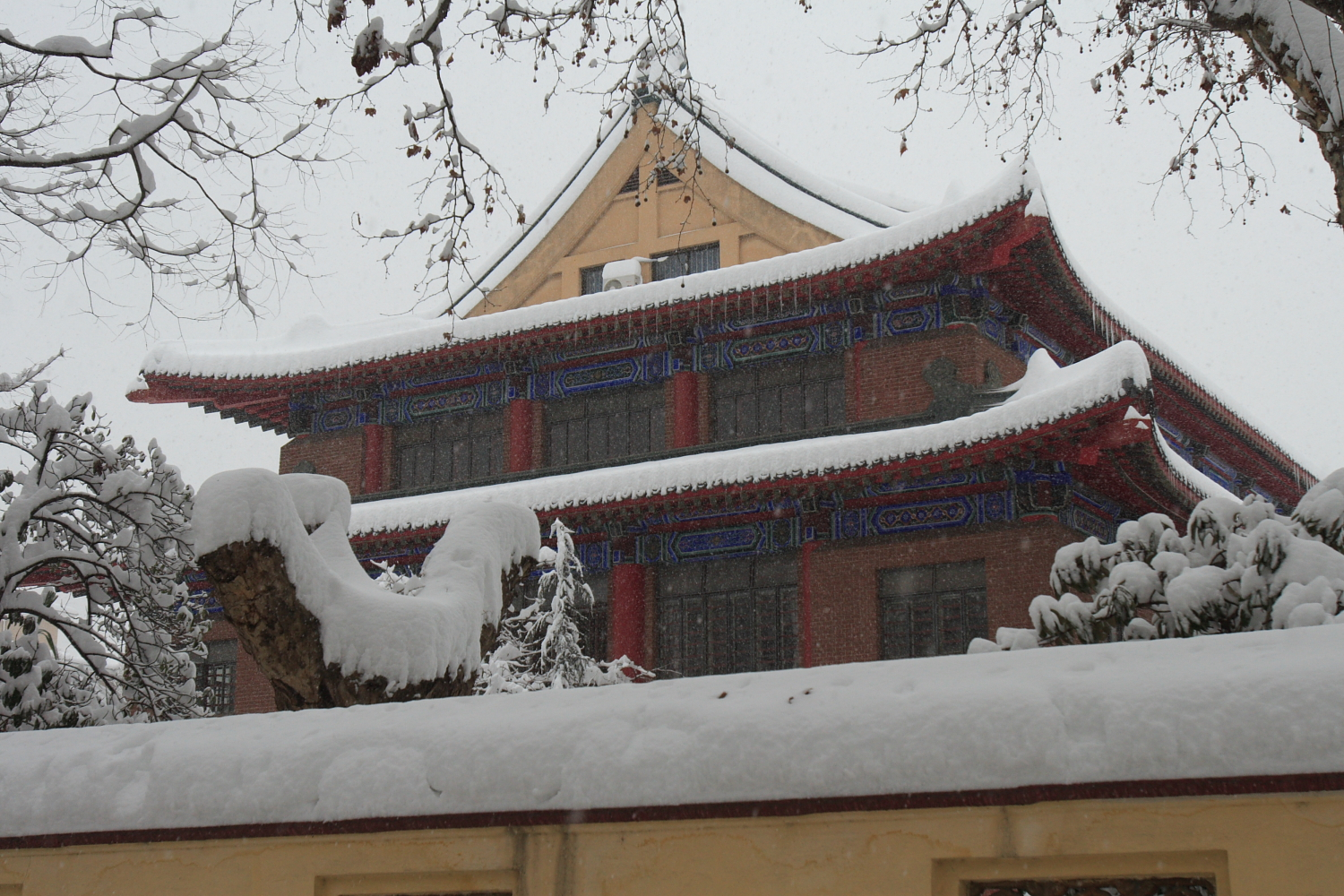
Former site of Executive Yuan in Gulou District, Nanjing (1946–1949)

Duencies may be dissolved or merged with other agencies. Based on Executive Yuan website, the following bodies are no longer agencies under the Executive Yuan:

- Consumer Protection Commission, restructured as the Consumer Protection Committee on 1 January 2012
- Aviation Safety Council, became an independent agency on 20 May 2012, later renamed Taiwan Transportation Safety Board
- National Disaster Prevention and Protection Commission: a task-force-grouped committee authorized by the law of Disaster Prevention and Protection. It was restructured as an implementation unit on 1 February 2010, and renamed to Office of Disaster Management.
- National Youth Commission, put under Ministry of Education as Youth Development Administration on 1 January 2013.
- Sports Affairs Council, put under Ministry of Education as Sports Administration on 1 January 2013.
- Coast Guard Administration, put under Ocean Affairs Council on 28 April 2018.
- Atomic Energy Council, restructured as the Nuclear Safety Commission on 27 September 2023.

=== Dissolved or ceased to function ===
- Government Information Office on 20 May 2012
- Council for Economic Planning and Development on 21 January 2014
- Research, Development and Evaluation Commission on 21 January 2014
- Mongolian and Tibetan Affairs Commission on 15 September 2017

== Executive Yuan Council ==
The Executive Yuan Council, commonly referred to as "The Cabinet" (內閣), is the chief policymaking organ of the ROC government. It consists of the premier, who presides over its meetings, the vice premier, ministers without portfolio, the heads of the ministries, and the heads of the Mongolian and Tibetan Affairs Commission and the Overseas Chinese Affairs Commission. The secretary-general and the deputy secretary-general of the Executive Yuan also attend, as well as heads of other Executive Yuan organizations by invitation, but they have no vote. Article 58 of the Constitution empowers the Executive Yuan Council to evaluate statutory and budgetary bills concerning martial law, amnesty, declarations of war, conclusion of peace or treaties, and other important affairs before submission to the Legislative Yuan.

== Relationship with the Legislative Yuan ==
The Executive Yuan Council must present the Legislators with an annual policy statement and an administrative report. The Legislative Committee may also summon members of the Executive Yuan Council for questioning.

Whenever there is disagreement between the Legislative Council and Executive Yuan Council, the Legislative Committee may pass a resolution asking the Executive Yuan Council to alter the policy proposal in question. The Executive Yuan may, in turn, ask the Legislators to reconsider. Afterwards, if the Legislative Council upholds the original resolution, the premier must abide by the resolution or resign. The Executive Yuan Council may also present an alternative budgetary bill if the one passed by the Legislative Committee is deemed difficult to execute.

== Executive Yuan Building ==
The Executive Yuan Building was built in 1940 as the new city hall for Taipei, on the site of Huashan Elementary School. After Taiwan was handed over to the Republic of China in 1945, Taipei's city hall was relocated to the former campus of Jian Cheng Elementary School. The old city hall building was turned over to house the provincial government for Taiwan. It became the Executive Yuan building in 1957.

The Executive Yuan building has been open to the public since 2003. It is accessible within walking distance east of Taipei Main Station or west of Shandao Temple Station of Taipei Metro.

== See also ==
- Department of State Affairs in the Three Departments and Six Ministries system
- Ming dynasty: Central Secretariat → Grand Secretariat
- Qing dynasty: Grand Secretariat → Grand Council → Cabinet
- Republic of China: State Council (1912–28); Politics of the Republic of China; Government of the Republic of China
- People's Republic of China: Government Administration Council of the Central People's Government (1949–54) → State Council of the People's Republic of China (1954–present); Ministries of the PRC
- Government-General of Taiwan (1895–1945)
