= Yu Tzong-shian =

Taiwanese economist (1930–2019)

Yu Tzong-shian (Chinese: 于宗先; 10 September 1930 – 3 August 2019) was a Taiwanese economist.

Yu earned a Bachelor of Arts in economics from the National Taiwan University in 1956, then completed a Master of Arts in Journalism from National Chengchi University (1959) continuing his studies in economics at Indiana University, where he earned a second Master of Arts in 1962 and a Ph.D. in 1966, respectively. After completing his doctoral studies, Yu joined the Academia Sinica's Institute of Economics as an associate research fellow. He was successively promoted to full research fellow in 1970, became deputy director of the institute in 1971, and elevated to the directorship from 1976 to 1982. Yu was the founding vice president of the Chung-Hua Institute for Economic Research from 1981 to 1990, and held the presidency until 1996. His later career was spent with the Chinese Institute of Economics and Business.

Yu was elected an academician of Academia Sinica in 1988 and died in Taipei on 3 August 2019.
