= Financial Supervisory Commission (Taiwan) =

Government agency in Taiwan

- 金融監督管理委員會; Jīnróng Jiāndū Guǎnlǐ Wěiyuánhuì (Mandarin); Kîm-yùng Kam-tuk Kón-lî Vî-yèn-fi (Hakka)
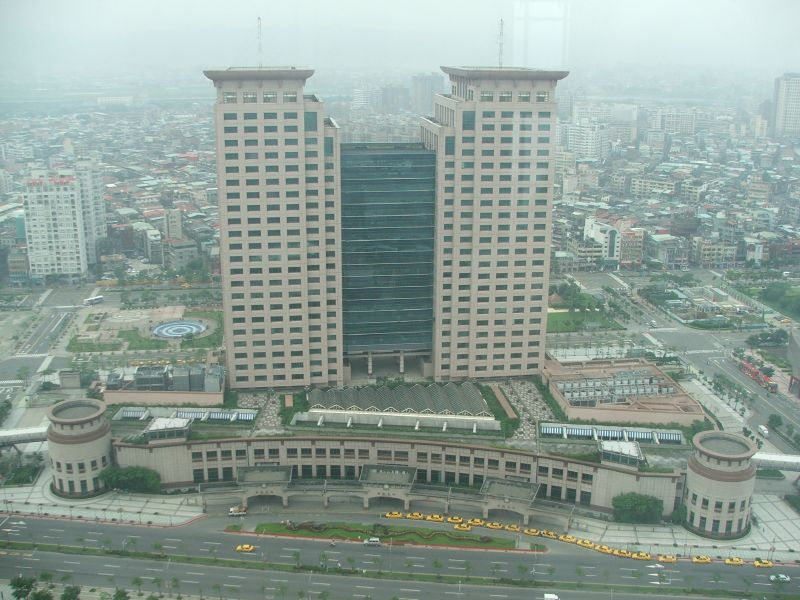
- FSC office is located inside the Banqiao station building

Agency overview
- Formed: 1 July 2004
- Jurisdiction: Taiwan (Republic of China)
- Headquarters: Banqiao, New Taipei
- Agency executive: Peng Jin-lung, Chairperson; Vice Chairpersons
- Website: www.fsc.gov.tw

The Financial Supervisory Commission (FSC; Chinese: 金融監督管理委員會; pinyin: Jīnróng Jiāndū Guǎnlǐ Wěiyuánhuì; Pe̍h-ōe-jī: Kim-iông Kàm-tok Kóan-lí Úi-oân-hōe, abbreviated to 金管會) is an independent government agency subordinate to the Executive Yuan of the Republic of China (Taiwan). It is responsible for regulating securities markets (including the Taiwan Stock Exchange and the Taiwan Futures Exchange), banking, and the insurance sector.

Its main office is located in Banqiao District, New Taipei.

== History ==
It was created on 1 July 2004 to unify several previously separate regulatory authorities which separately supervised different sectors of the finance industry. Prior to the actual creation of the commission, several alternative structures for regulatory agency reform had been proposed, including a purely non-governmental commission, as well as the establishment of both a governmental regulatory agency and non-governmental supervisory commission; the choice of a purely governmental commission was finalized in 2003 by the Legislative Yuan.

The reasons for the creation of the FSC as an umbrella independent financial regulator was due to:

1. Financial convergence and cross-market business - market has evolved and became more complex to manage
2. Single financial regulator - one stop shop for regulating all securities and investments.
3. Independent Authority at Cabinet Level - experts in their field without political interference
4. Stronger Law Enforcement - cross referencing cases and building stronger case for misconduct

The commission has faced frequent changes in leadership in its short history, due to scandals and crises which began when its first chairperson was removed from his position due to corruption.

== Structure ==
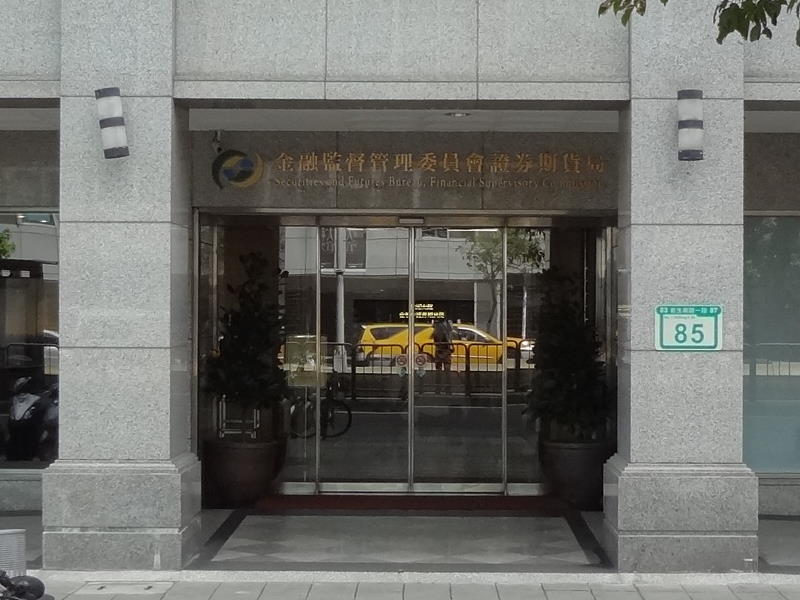
Securities and Futures Bureau

=== Bureaus ===
- Banking Bureau
- Financial Examination Bureau
- Insurance Bureau
- Securities and Futures Bureau

=== Departments ===
- Department of Planning
- Department of International Affairs
- Department of Legal Affairs
- Department of Information Management
- Other support units

== List of chairpersons ==
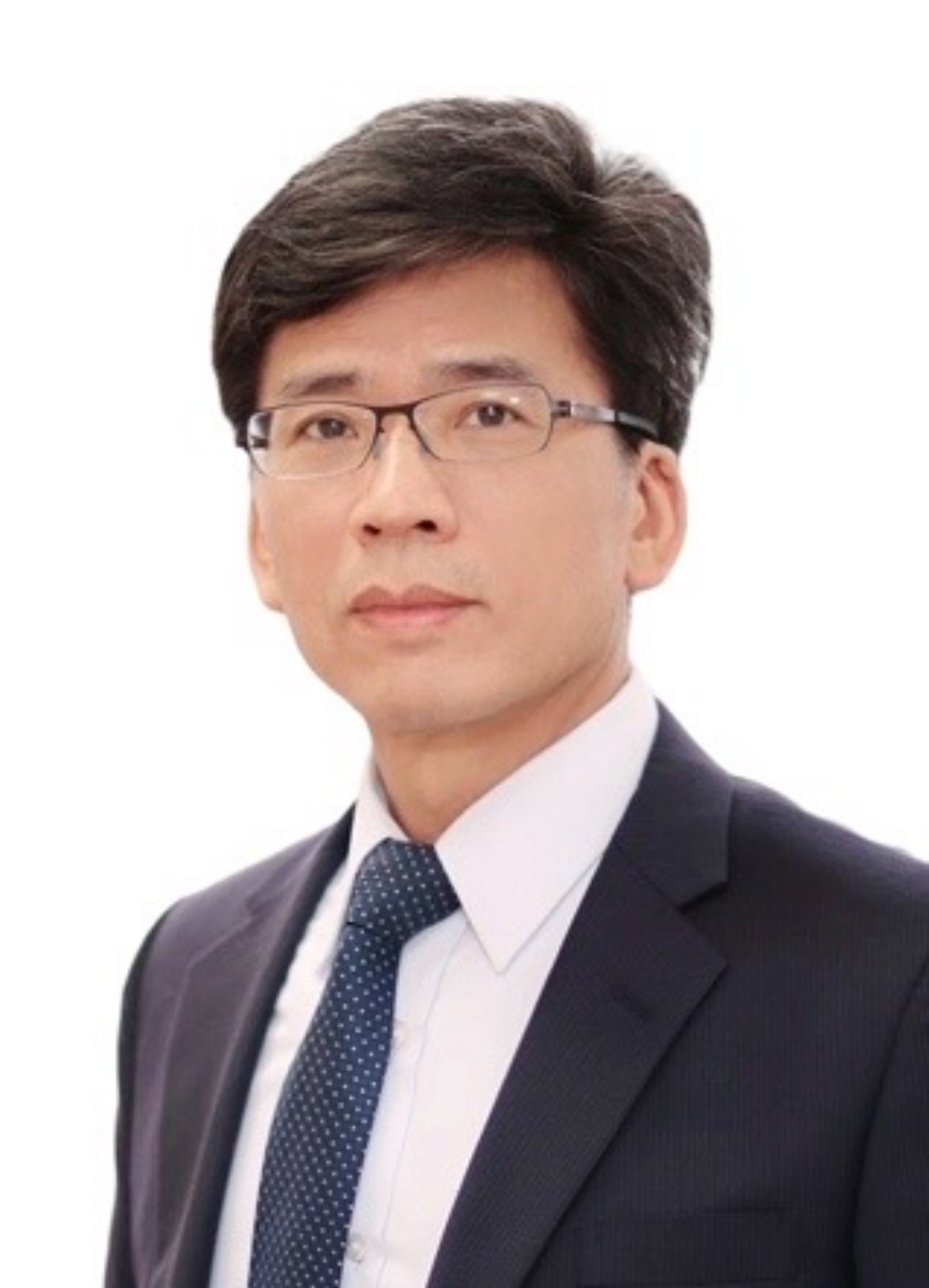
Peng Jin-lung, the incumbent Chairperson of Financial Supervisory Commission

Political Party: Democratic Progressive Party Kuomintang Non-partisan/ unknown

№	Name	Term of Office		Days	Political Party	Premier
1	Kong Jaw-sheng (龔照勝)	1 July 2004	12 May 2006 (Note: Removed from his position on charges of corruption.)	680		Yu Shyi-kun; Frank Hsieh; Su Tseng-chang I
—	Lu Daung-yen (呂東英)	12 May 2006	4 August 2006	84		Su Tseng-chang I
2	Shih Jun-ji (施俊吉)	4 August 2006	12 January 2007 (Note: Resigned due to a run on Rebar Chinese Bank)	161	Independent	Su Tseng-chang I
—	Susan Chang (張秀蓮)	12 January 2007	25 January 2007	13		Su Tseng-chang I
3	Hu Sheng-cheng (胡勝正)	25 January 2007	1 July 2008	523	Democratic Progressive Party	Su Tseng-chang I Chang Chun-hsiung II; Liu Chao-shiuan
4	Gordon Chen (陳樹)	1 July 2008	1 December 2008	153	Kuomintang	Liu Chao-shiuan
5	Sean Chen (陳冲)	1 December 2008	17 May 2010	532	Kuomintang	Liu Chao-shiuan; Wu Den-yih
6	Chen Yuh-chang (陳裕璋)	17 May 2010	29 July 2013	1169	Kuomintang	Wu Den-yih; Sean Chen; Jiang Yi-huah
7	Tseng Ming-chung (曾銘宗)	29 July 2013	31 January 2016 (Note: Left office to take office as a Member of the Legislative Yuan.)	916	Kuomintang	Jiang Yi-huah; Mao Chi-kuo
8	Wang Li-ling (王儷玲)	1 February 2016	20 May 2016	109		Chang San-cheng
9	Ding Kung-wha (丁克華)	20 May 2016	3 October 2016 (Note: Resigned due to scandal of Mega International Commercial Bank issues.)	136		Lin Chuan
—	Huang Tien-mu (黃天牧)	3 October 2016	19 October 2016	16		Lin Chuan
10	Lee Ruey-tsang (李瑞倉)	19 October 2016	8 September 2017	324		Lin Chuan
11	Wellington Koo (顧立雄)	8 September 2017	20 May 2020	985	Democratic Progressive Party	William Lai; Su Tseng-chang II
12	Huang Tien-mu (黃天牧)	20 May 2020	20 May 2024	1461		Su Tseng-chang II; Chen Chien-jen
13	Peng Jin-lung (彭金隆)	20 May 2024	Incumbent	810		Cho Jung-tai

== Overseas representative offices ==
- United Kingdom - London
- United States - New York City

== See also ==
- Economy of Taiwan
- Regulatory agency
- Securities Commission
- Statutory authority
- List of financial supervisory authorities by country
