= Chung-Hua Institution for Economic Research =

Research center in Da'an, Taipei, Taiwan

Chung-Hua Institution for Economic Research 中華經濟研究院
- Founded: 1 July 1981
- Location: Da'an, Taipei, Taiwan
- Website: www.cier.edu.tw

The Chung-Hua Institution for Economic Research (CIER; Chinese: 中華經濟研究院; pinyin: Zhōnghuá Jīngjì Yánjiùyuàn) is a Taiwan-based international policy think tank for economic and industry-related research. It conducts both public research and fee-supported research.

== History ==
After the ending of diplomatic relations between the Republic of China and the United States in 1979, the Government of the Republic of China drew up a very crucial measures for financial and economic reform. Among them was the proposal to establish an independent research institution with government funding and financial support from the industrial and business sectors. The legal entity was to undertake the task of studying the local and international economic situation and to offer policy recommendations to the government.

After the project was approved, the Executive Yuan entrusted the Council for Economic Planning and Development to guide and plan the institution's establishment. On 1 February 1980, the council formed the preparatory body and it was named the Preparatory Commission for Chung-Hua Institution for Economic Research. CIER was finally established on 1 July 1981.

== Organizational structure ==
The current Chairman of the Board is Professor Tien-Wang Tsaur (Chinese: 曹添旺) from the Soochow University School of Business, and the president is Professor Hsien-Ming Lien (Chinese: 连贤明) of the Department of Finance at the National Chengchi University. The CIER currently includes:

- The First Research Division
- The Second Research Division
- The Third Research Division
- The Center for Economic Forecasting
- Taiwan WTO and RTA Center
- The Center for Financial and Economic Strategies
- The Regional Development Study Center
- The Center for Energy and Environmental Research
- The Center for Science and Technology Policy Evaluation and Research
- The Taiwan ASEAN Studies Center
- The Center for Small and Medium Enterprise Research
- The Japan Center Sub-Committee
- The Center for Green Economy
- Secretarial Section
- Library
- Data Processing Office
- Publication Office

== See also ==
- Economy of Taiwan
- Taiwan Institute of Economic Research
- Institute of Economics, Academia Sinica
- Mai Chao-cheng, president of the institution from 1986 to 1992
- KAIST College of Business' School of Business and Technology Management.
