= Wang Li-ling =

Taiwanese accountant

- 王儷玲

Chairperson of Financial Supervisory Commission
- In office 1 February 2016 – 20 May 2016
- Preceded by: Tseng Ming-chung
- Succeeded by: Ding Kung-wha

Vice Chairperson of Financial Supervisory Commission
- In office 2013 – 31 January 2016
- Chairperson: Chen Yuh-chang
- Preceded by: Catherine Lee

Personal details
- Education: Fu Jen Catholic University (BA); University of Hartford (MA); Temple University (PhD)

Wang Li-ling (Chinese: 王儷玲; pinyin: Wáng Lìlíng) also known as Jennifer Wang, is a Taiwanese accountant. She was the Vice Chairperson of the Financial Supervisory Commission (FSC) from 2013 to 2016, when she was appointed chair.

== Education ==
Wang graduated from Fu Jen Catholic University with a bachelor's degree in Chinese literature. She then pursued graduate studies in the United States, where she earned a master's degree in accounting from the University of Hartford and earned her Ph.D. in risk management and insurance from Temple University in 1998. Her doctoral dissertation, completed under professor Jack Vanderhei, was titled, "An analysis of pension trends in the provision of retirement income: From defined benefit to defined contribution plans".

== Non-political career ==
Wang was appointed the Chairperson of the Department of Risk Management and Insurance of National Chengchi University in 2008–2011. She was the Director of First Financial Holding Co., Ltd. in 2009–2012. She was the Chairperson of Pension Fund Association in 2011–2013.

== Political career ==
Wang was appointed as the Vice Chairperson of FSC in 2013. On 1 February 2016, she was appointed as the chairperson of the commission after small cabinet reshuffle.
