= Youth Development Administration =

Taiwanese governmental body

- 教育部青年發展署

Agency overview
- Formed: 8 January 1966
- Jurisdiction: Taiwan
- Headquarters: Taipei City; 25°02′32″N 121°31′10″E
- Agency executive: Lo Ching-Shui, Director-General
- Parent agency: Ministry of Education
- Website: www.yda.gov.tw

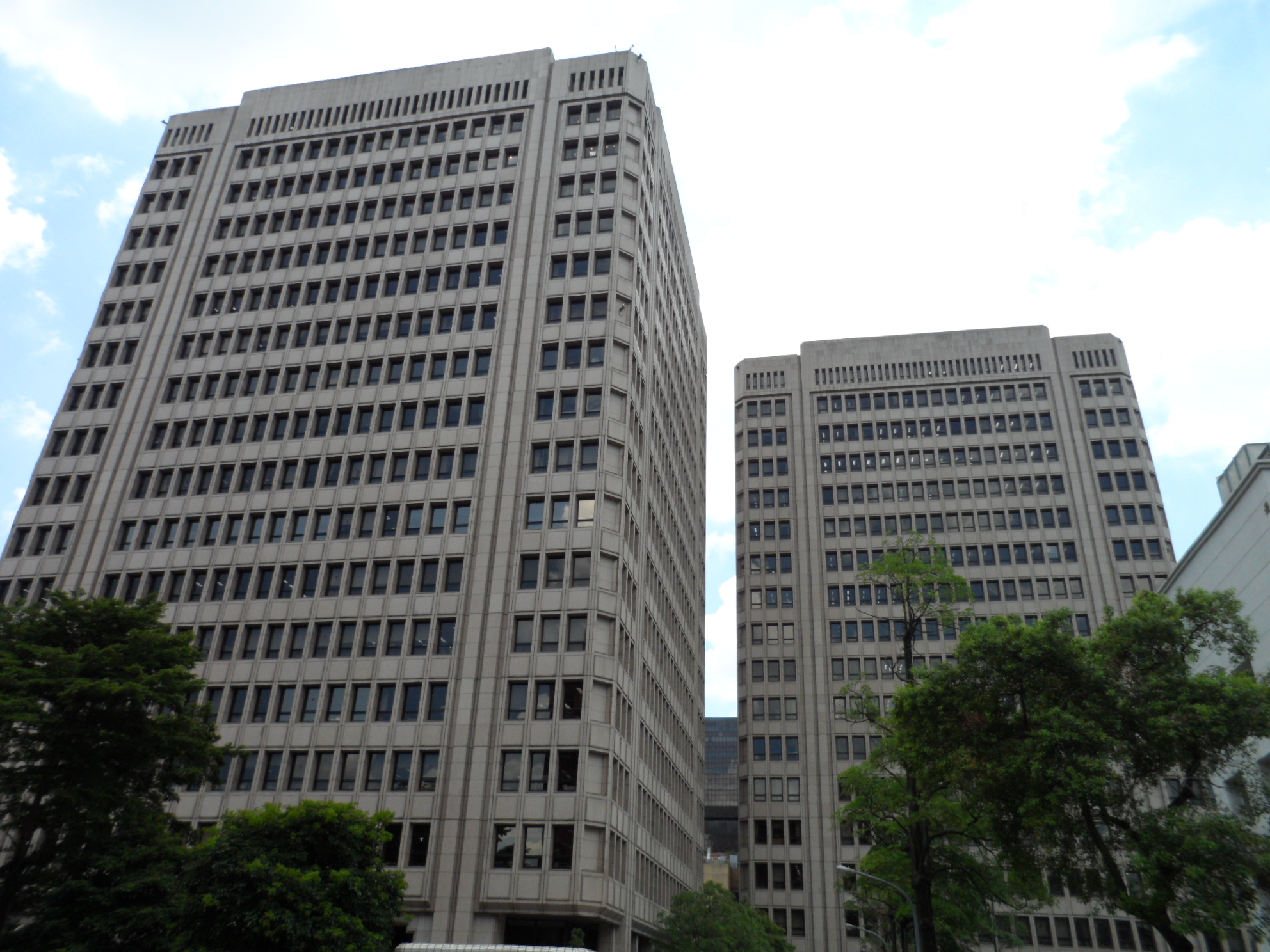
Youth Development Administration

The Youth Development Administration (YDA; Chinese: 青年發展署;Bopomofo :ㄋㄧㄢˊ ㄈㄚ ㄓㄢˇ ㄕㄨˇ) is a branch of the Ministry of Education of Taiwan with a responsibility for youth affairs.

== History ==
It was established on 28 January 1966 as the National Youth Commission (NYC; Chinese: 青輔會; pinyin: Qīngfǔ Huì) under the Executive Yuan until 1 January 2013 when it was put under the administration of the Ministry of Education as a result of the reorganization of the Executive Yuan and renamed to Youth Development Administration.

== Organizational structure ==
- Planning and Career Consultant Division
- Public Participation Division
- International and Experiential Learning Division
- Secretariat
- Personnel Office
- Civil Service Ethics Office
- Accounting Office

== Transportation ==
The YDA office building is accessible within walking distance North East from NTU Hospital Station of the Taipei Metro.

== See also ==
- Ministry of Education (Taiwan)
