= Ministry of Civil Service (Taiwan) =

Government agency of Taiwan

- 銓敘部; Quánxùbù (Mandarin); Chhiòn-si Phu (Hakka)
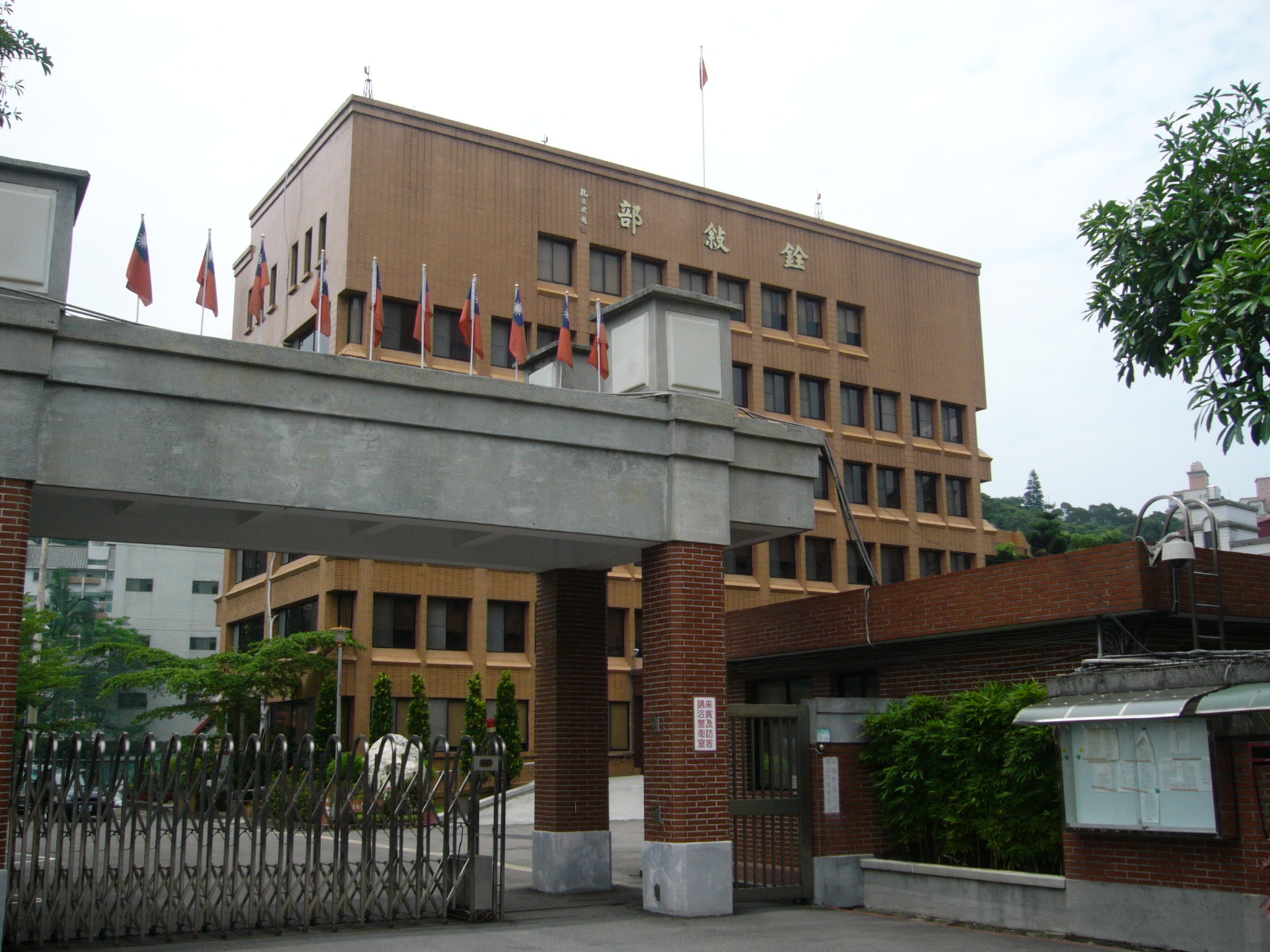

Agency overview
- Jurisdiction: Taiwan (Republic of China)
- Headquarters: Wenshan, Taipei
- Ministers responsible: Chou Chih-hung, Minister; Lin Wen-tsan, Tsai Hsiu-chuan, Deputy Ministers
- Parent agency: Examination Yuan
- Website: www.mocs.gov.tw

The Ministry of Civil Service (MOCS; Chinese: 銓敘部; pinyin: Quánxùbù; Pe̍h-ōe-jī: Chhoan-sū Pō͘) is a second level policy-making body, governed under the Examination Yuan of the Republic of China (Taiwan) and is the fundamental Examination Yuan agency responsible for overseeing pay and entitlements, performance evaluation, insurance, retirement and pension programs, and relief for civil servants throughout Taiwan.

== Core functions ==
The ministry exercises authority over the employment and discharge, performance evaluation, pay grading, promotion and transfer, insurance, retirement, and compensation for civil servants. The ministry is also responsible for the management of the Public Service Pension Funds as well as the supervision of the Directorate-General of Personnel Administration regarding personnel policy and the oversight of central and local personnel agencies.

== Ministry structure ==
The Ministry is currently organized as follows:

- Department of Personnel Planning and Regulations
- Department of General Quantification Screening
- Department of Special Quantification Screening
- Department of Retirement and Survivor
- Department of Personnel Management
- Special Operations Units
- Public Service Pension Fund Management Board
- Public Servant and Teacher Insurance Supervisory Committee

== Ministers ==
Kuomintang (Nationalist) People First Party Non-partisan/ unknown Democratic Progressive Party

№	Name	Term of Office		Days	Political Party	Yuan President
1	Chang Nan-hsien (張難先)	November 1929	December 1930		Kuomintang	Tai Chi-tao
2	Niou Yung-chien (鈕永建)	December 1930	March 1933		Kuomintang	Tai Chi-tao
3	Lin Hsiang (林翔)	March 1933	August 1935		Kuomintang	Tai Chi-tao
4	Shih Ying (石瑛)	August 1935	December 1937		Kuomintang	Tai Chi-tao
(2)	Niou Yung-chien (鈕永建)	December 1937	June 1939		Kuomintang	Tai Chi-tao
5	Li Peiji (李培基)	June 1939	January 1942		Kuomintang	Tai Chi-tao
6	Chia Ching-teh (賈景德)	January 1942	13 July 1948		Kuomintang	Tai Chi-ta; Chang Po-ling
7	Shen Hung-lieh (沈鴻烈)	13 July 1948	25 November 1949	500	Kuomintang	Chang Po-ling
8	Pi Tsuo-chiung (皮作瓊)	25 November 1949	23 May 1952	910	Kuomintang	Niou Yung-chien; Chia Ching-teh
9	Lei Fa-chang (雷法章)	23 May 1952	1 July 1963	4056	Kuomintang	Chia Ching-teh; Mo Teh-hui
10	Shih Chueh (石覺)	1 July 1963	1 November 1975	4506	Kuomintang	Mo Teh-hui; Sun Fo; Yang Liang-kung
11	Han Chung-mo (韓忠謨)	1 November 1975	14 April 1977	530	Kuomintang	Yang Liang-kung
12	Jack C. K. Teng (鄧傳楷)	14 April 1977	1 September 1984	2697	Kuomintang	Yang Liang-kung; Liu Chi-hung
13	Chen Kuei-hua (陳桂華)	1 September 1984	1 September 1994	3652	Kuomintang	Kung Teh-cheng; Chiu Chuang-huan
14	John Kuan (關中)	1 September 1994	1 September 1996	731	Kuomintang	Chiu Chuang-huan
—	Lee Jo-i (李若一)	1 September 1996	20 September 1996	19	Kuomintang	Hsu Shui-teh
15	Chiu Chin-yi (邱進益)	20 September 1996	20 May 2000	1338	Kuomintang	Hsu Shui-teh
16	Wu Rong-ming (吳容明)	20 May 2000	16 June 2004	1488	People First Party	Hsu Shui-teh; Yao Chia-wen
17	Chu Wu-hsien (朱武獻)	16 June 2004	20 May 2008	1434		Yao Chia-wen
—	Wu Tsung-cheng (吳聰成)	20 May 2008	1 September 2008	104		Yao Chia-wen
18	Chang Che-chen (張哲琛)	1 September 2008	20 May 2016	2818	Kuomintang	Wu Jin-lin; John Kuan; Wu Jin-lin
19	Chou Hung-hsien (周弘憲)	20 May 2016	1 September 2020	1565	Democratic Progressive Party	Wu Jin-lin
20	Chou Chih-hung (周志宏)	1 September 2020	20 May 2024	1357		Huang Jong-tsun
21	Jay N. Shih (施能傑)	20 May 2024	Incumbent	810		Huang Jong-tsun

== See also ==
- Government of the Republic of China
  - Executive Yuan
    - Directorate-General of Personnel Administration
      - Civil Service Development Institute
      - Regional Civil Service Development Institute
  - Examination Yuan
    - Ministry of Examination
    - Civil Service Protection and Training Commission
