= Ministry of Examination =

Government agency of Taiwan

- 考選部; Kǎoxuǎnbù (Mandarin); Kháu-sién Phu (Hakka)

Agency overview
- Jurisdiction: Taiwan (Republic of China)
- Headquarters: Wenshan, Taipei
- Ministers responsible: Tsai Tzung-jen, Minister; Hsu Shu-hsiang, Tseng Hui-min, Deputy Ministers
- Parent agency: Examination Yuan
- Website: www.moex.gov.tw

The Ministry of Examination (MOEX; Chinese: 考選部; pinyin: Kǎoxuǎnbù; Pe̍h-ōe-jī: Khó-sóan Pō͘) is a second level policy-making body, governed under the Examination Yuan of the Republic of China (Taiwan) and is the fundamental Examination Yuan agency responsible for the administration of national examinations and the supervision of contract examinations throughout Taiwan.

== History ==
The recruitment of civil servants is one key element in government personnel management and the recruitment through selective examinations has been a long-standing system in Chinese history. After the foundation of the Republic of China, the Examination Council was established in 1929 to oversee examination administration affairs. Following the promulgation of the Constitution, the Ministry was formally established on 21 July 1948.

== Ministry structure ==
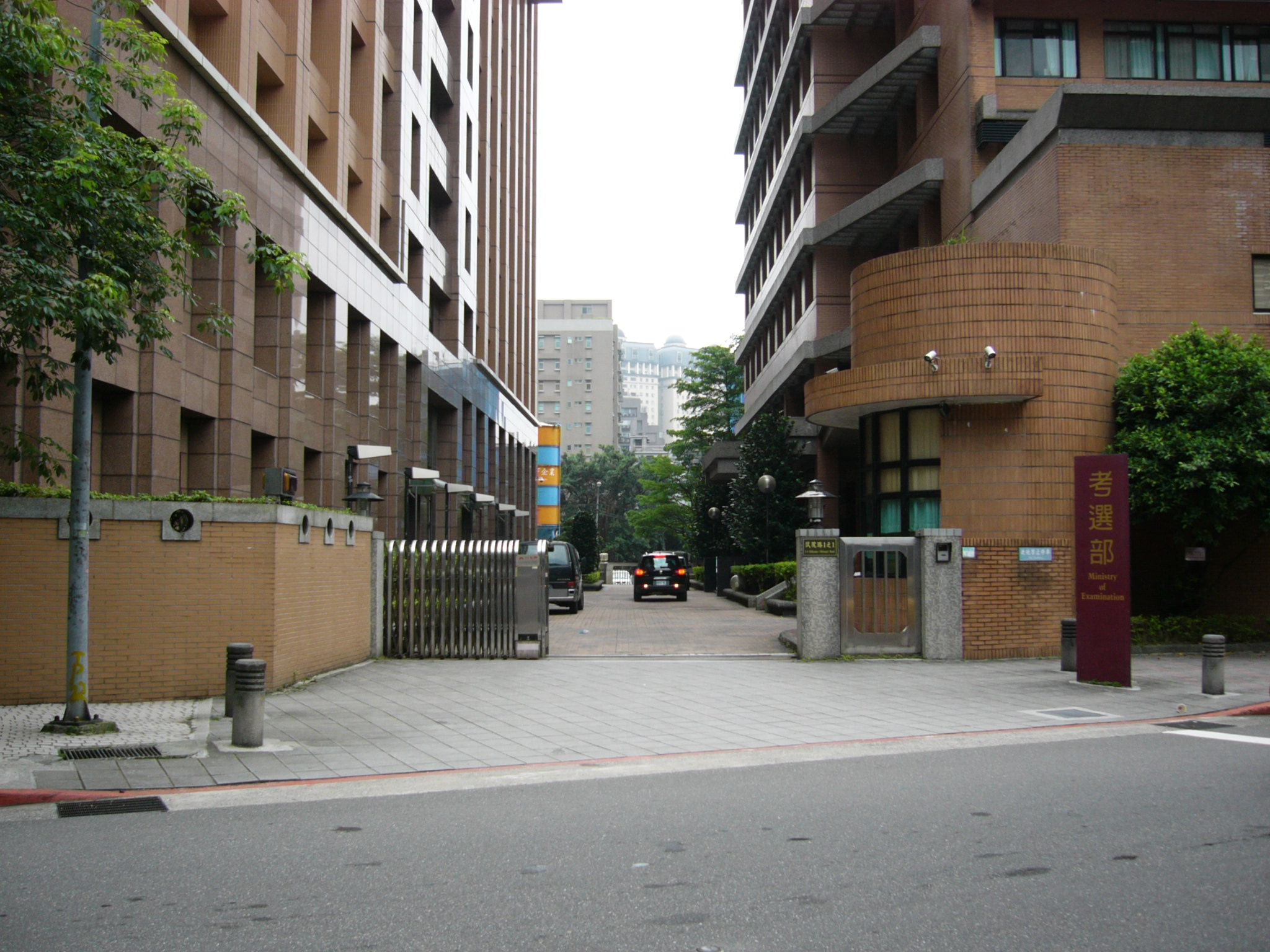
Ministry of Examination of the Republic of China

The Ministry is currently organized as follows:

- Department of Examination Planning
- Department of Junior & Senior Examinations
- Department of Special Examinations
- Department of Professional & Technical Examinations
- Department of Question Bank Management
- Department of Information Management
- Department of General Affairs
- Secretariat
- Human Resources Office
- Accounting Office
- Statistics Office
- Ethics Office

== Ministers ==
Kuomintang (Nationalist) Non-partisan/ unknown Democratic Progressive Party

№	Name	Term of Office		Days	Political Party	Yuan President
1	Tien Chung-chin (田炯錦)	13 July 1948	15 May 1950	671	Kuomintang	Chang Po-ling; Niou Yung-chien
—	Ma Kuo-lin (馬國琳)	15 May 1950	23 May 1952	739	Kuomintang	Niou Yung-chien; Chia Ching-teh
2	Shih Shang-kuan (史尚寬)	June 1952	16 August 1957		Kuomintang	Chia Ching-teh; Mo Teh-hui
3	Chen Hsueh-ping (陳雪屏)	16 August 1957	14 July 1958	332	Kuomintang	Mo Teh-hui
4	Huang Chi-lu (黃季陸)	22 July 1958	28 February 1961	952	Kuomintang	Mo Teh-hui
5	Lee Shou-yung (李壽雍)	28 February 1961	22 July 1971	3795		Mo Teh-hui; Sun Fo
6	Chung Chiao-kuang (鍾皎光)	21 July 1971	20 December 1978	2708	Kuomintang	Sun Fo; Yang Liang-kung; Liu Chi-hung
7	Tang Chen-chu (唐振楚)	20 December 1978	29 August 1984	2079	Kuomintang	Liu Chi-hung
8	Chu Shao-hua (瞿韶華)	29 August 1984	6 September 1990	2199	Kuomintang	Kung Teh-cheng
9	Wang Tso-jung (王作榮)	6 September 1990	4 September 1996	2190	Kuomintang	Kung Teh-cheng; Chiu Chuang-huan
10	Chen Chin-jang (陳金讓)	4 September 1996	20 January 1999	868	Kuomintang	Hsu Shui-teh
11	Wu Wan-lan (吳挽瀾)	27 January 1999	20 May 2000	479	Kuomintang	Hsu Shui-teh
12	Liu Chu-chih (劉初枝)	20 May 2000	20 May 2004	1461		Hsu Shui-teh; Yao Chia-wen
13	Lin Chia-cheng (林嘉誠)	20 May 2004	20 May 2008	1461	Democratic Progressive Party	Yao Chia-wen
—	Hwang Yea-baang (黃雅榜)	20 May 2008	1 September 2008	104		Yao Chia-wen
14	Yang Chao-hsiang (楊朝祥)	1 September 2008	29 July 2010	696	Kuomintang	Wu Jin-lin; John Kuan
15	Lai Feng-wei (賴峰偉)	29 July 2010	10 February 2012	561	Kuomintang	John Kuan
16	Tung Pao-cheng (董保城)	10 February 2012	August 2015		Independent	John Kuan; Wu Jin-lin
17	Chiu Hua-chun (邱華君)	August 2015	20 May 2016		Independent	Wu Jin-lin
18	Tsai Tzung-jen (蔡宗珍)	20 May 2016	30 September 2019	1228	Independent	Wu Jin-lin; Huang Jong-tsun
19	Hsu Shu-hsiang (許舒翔)	1 October 2019	20 May 2024	1693	Independent	Huang Jong-tsun
20	Lio Mon-chi (劉孟奇)	20 May 2024	Incumbent	810	Independent	Huang Jong-tsun

== See also ==
- Government of the Republic of China
  - Executive Yuan
    - Directorate-General of Personnel Administration
      - Civil Service Development Institute
      - Regional Civil Service Development Institute
  - Examination Yuan
    - Ministry of Civil Service (Taiwan)
    - Civil Service Protection and Training Commission
