= Civil Service Protection and Training Commission =

Government agency of Taiwan

- 公務人員保障暨培訓委員會; Gōngwù Rényuán Bǎozhàng jì Péixùn Wěiyuanhuì
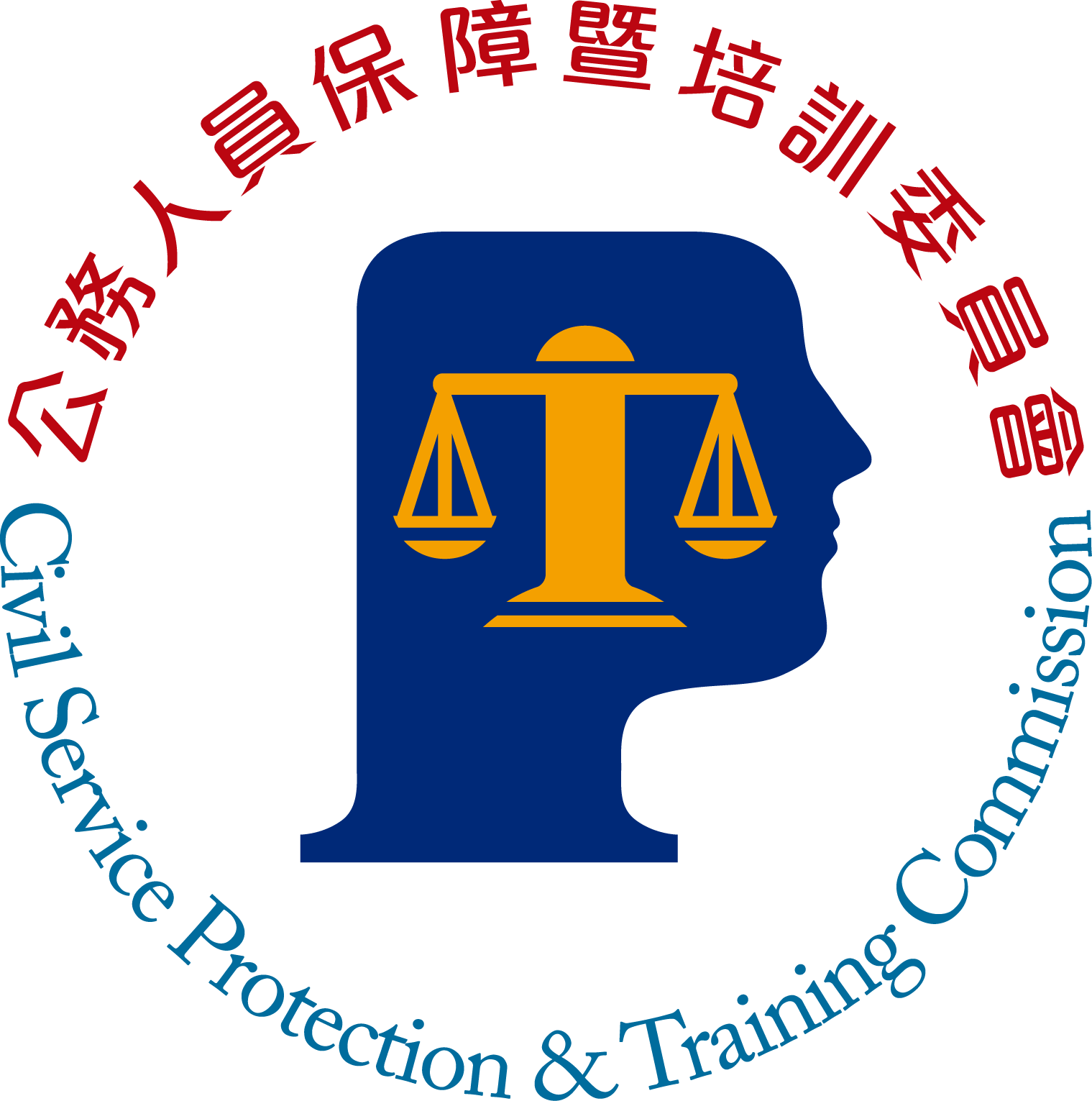
- Logo of CSPTC

Agency overview
- Formed: 1 June 1996
- Jurisdiction: Republic of China
- Headquarters: Wenshan, Taipei
- Ministers responsible: Tsai Hsiu-chuan, Minister; Chen Chia-hui, Political Deputy Minister; Hsu Shiow-cheun, Administrative Deputy Minister
- Parent agency: Examination Yuan
- Website: www.csptc.gov.tw/en/

The Civil Service Protection and Training Commission (CSPTC; Chinese: 公務人員保障暨培訓委員會; pinyin: Gōngwù Rényuán Bǎozhàng jì Péixùn Wěiyuanhuì) is a ministry-level policy-making body, governed under the Examination Yuan of the Republic of China and is the fundamental Examination Yuan agency responsible for training and safeguarding the rights and interests of civil servants.

== Current Operations ==
=== Safeguard for Civil Servants ===
The CSPTC reviews petitions for deliberation (against administrative actions taken by the employer or relevant personnel agency of the civil servant) and re-appeal cases (against decisions, deemed unacceptable by the civil servant, made by the employer regarding an appeal to its management measures or working conditions) that are filed to the commission. The commission's decisions are binding and will be followed up.

=== Civil Servant Training Programs ===
The CSPTC provides the following training programs: training for personnel who passed the civil service examinations; promotion training; training for medium- to long-term development of senior civil servants; and training on administrative neutrality.

== Administrative structure ==
The Commission is currently organized as follows:

- Commissioners
- Department of Civil Service Protection
- Department of Local Civil Service Protection
- Department of Special Examinations
- Department of Training Development
- Department of Training Assessment
- Secretariat
- Personnel Office
- Accounting Office
- Counselors Office
- Ethics Office

=== Subordinate Agencies ===
- National Academy of Civil Service

== Ministers ==
Kuomintang (Nationalist) Non-partisan/ unknown Democratic Progressive Party

№	Name	Term of Office		Days	Political Party	Yuan President
1	Lin Chi-yuan (林基源)	1 June 1996	20 May 2000	1449	Kuomintang	Chiu Chuang-huan; Hsu Shui-teh
2	Chou Hung-hsien (周弘憲)	20 May 2000	January 2006		Democratic Progressive Party	Hsu Shui-teh; Yao Chia-wen
3	Liu Shou-cheng (劉守成)	January 2006	20 May 2008		Democratic Progressive Party	Yao Chia-wen
4	Chang Ming-jue (張明珠)	1 September 2008	October 2010			Wu Jin-lin; John Kuan
5	Tsai Bih-hwang (蔡璧煌)	October 2010	20 May 2016		Kuomintang	John Kuan; Wu Jin-lin
6	Lee I-yang (李逸洋)	20 May 2016	1 March 2017	285	Democratic Progressive Party	Wu Jin-lin
7	Kuo Fang-yu (郭芳煜)	1 March 2017	1 September 2020	1280		Wu Jin-lin
8	Hao Pei-chih (郝培芝)	1 September 2020	12 August 2024	1441		Huang Jong-tsun
9	Tsai Hsiu-chuan (蔡秀涓)	1 September 2024	Incumbent	706		Huang Jong-tsun

== See also ==
- Government of the Republic of China
  - Executive Yuan
    - Directorate-General of Personnel Administration
      - Civil Service Development Institute
      - Regional Civil Service Development Institute
  - Examination Yuan
    - Ministry of Examination
    - Ministry of Civil Service (Taiwan)
