= Lin Chia-cheng =

Taiwanese politician (1952–2025)

- 林嘉誠

Minister of Examination
- In office 20 May 2004 – 20 May 2008
- Preceded by: Liu Chu-chih
- Succeeded by: Hwang Yea-baang (acting); Yang Chao-hsiang

Minister of the Research, Development and Evaluation Commission
- In office May 2000 – May 2004
- Preceded by: Wea Chi-lin
- Succeeded by: Yeh Jiunn-rong

Personal details
- Born: 1952
- Died: August 2025 (aged 73)
- Education: National Taiwan University (BA, PhD)

Lin Chia-cheng (Chinese: 林嘉誠; 1952 – August 2025) was a Taiwanese political scientist, sociologist and politician.

== Life and career ==
Lin earned his Bachelor of Arts in political science and his Ph.D. in political science from National Taiwan University. He then became a professor of sociology at Soochow University. While Lin taught at Soochow University, he was invited to a number of panel discussions hosted by the Free China Review. During these discussions in 1988, Lin described the relationship between lifting martial law in Taiwan and its effect on democratization, explicitly cautioned the Democratic Progressive Party against focusing on Taiwan independence, opining that independence was not achievable at that point in time, but continually advocating for it would increase political tension and division. In another panel discussion hosted by the Review in 1990, Lin considered political developments in Taiwan through five main viewpoints, naming constitutional reform, the Civic Organizations Law's influence on nascent party politics, the power of public opinion, the legal protection of human rights, and changes in parliamentary structure, primarily the supplementary elections to the Legislative Yuan, as key to democratization in Taiwan. Lin regarded public and special interest groups as part of a politically pluralistic society, as long as such organizations respected norms.

Lin was appointed head of Taipei City Government's Research, Development and Evaluation Commission, then subsequently served as deputy mayor of the city between 1997 and 1998. At the age of 47, he was selected to lead the Executive Yuan's Research, Development and Evaluation Commission in 2000, as a member of the Chen Shui-bian presidential administration. As head of the RDEC, Lin supported the building of casinos on Kinmen and Matsu. He also claimed that the Chen administration's proposed budget for fiscal year 2001 would save NT$70 billion when compared to the previous government's budget, but Kuomintang lawmaker Yen Ching-piao countered that the Chen government's budget proposal had added NT$95 billion in expenditures compared to the fiscal year 2000 budget. In May 2002, Lin inaugurated an online learning platform for public sector employees, as part of a six-year program that sought to make Taiwan a "digitalized state." After Chen Shui-bian won a second presidential term in 2004, Lin was formally sworn in as Minister of Examination on 8 June 2004.

While serving in the Executive Yuan, Lin continued his advocacy for human rights, among them the movement of natural persons. Opinion pieces written by Lin appeared in the Taipei Times before and after his retirement from public service. In these editorials, Lin disclosed steps taken at the RDEC to gather evidence on the 228 incident, Kaohsiung incident, and other government actions during the martial law era, opinions on aspects of governance missing and needed during the 2014 Kaohsiung gas explosions, views on the economy of Taiwan, and expressed support for the consolidation of the Examination Yuan.

On 18 August 2025, Soochow University announced that Lin had died at the age of 73.
