= Lee I-yang =

Taiwanese politician

- 李逸洋
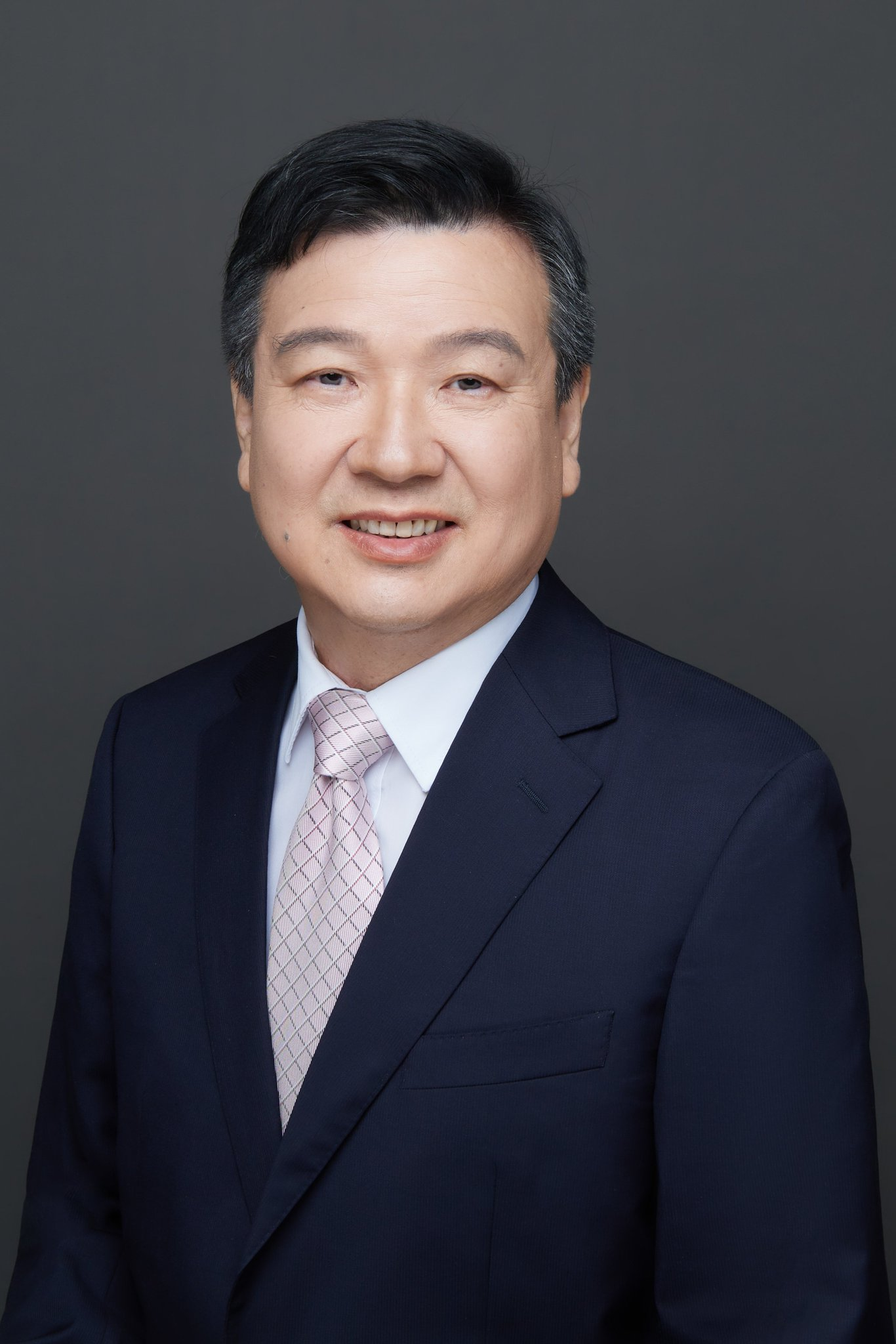
- Official portrait, 2024

13th Representative of Taiwan to Japan
- Incumbent
- Assumed office 9 September 2024
- President: Lai Ching-te
- Preceded by: Frank Hsieh

15th Vice President of the Examination Yuan
- In office 1 March 2017 – 1 September 2020
- Appointed by: Tsai Ing-wen
- President: Wu Jin-lin
- Preceded by: Kao Yuang-kuang
- Succeeded by: Chou Hung-hsien
Additional positions
6th Minister of the Civil Service Protection and Training Commission
In office 20 May 2016 – 1 March 2017
Appointed by	Tsai Ing-wen
President	Wu Jin-lin
Preceded by	Tsai Bih-hwang
Succeeded by	Kuo Fang-yu
26th Minister of the Interior
In office 25 January 2006 – 20 May 2008
Prime Minister	Su Tseng-chang; Chang Chun-hsiung
Deputy	Lin Mei-chu
Preceded by	Su Chia-chyuan
Succeeded by	Liao Liou-yi
10th Secretary-General of the Democratic Progressive Party
In office 1 February 2005 – 25 January 2006
Chairman	Chen Shui-bian
Preceded by	Chang Chun-hsiung
Succeeded by	Lin Chia-lung
8th Minister of Personnel Administration
In office 1 February 2002 – 1 February 2005
Prime Minister	Yu Shyi-kun
Preceded by	Chu Wu-hsien
Succeeded by	Chang Chun-yen
Deputy Minister of the Interior
In office 20 May 2000 – 1 February 2002
Minister	Chang Po-ya

Personal details
- Born: 28 June 1955 (age 70) Keelung City, Taiwan
- Party: Democratic Progressive Party
- Education: National Taiwan University (BA, MA)

Lee I-yang (Chinese: 李逸洋; pinyin: Lǐ Yìyáng; born 28 June 1955) is a Taiwanese politician and former journalist. A member of the Democratic Progressive Party (DPP), he is Taiwan's Representative to Japan (equivalent of an ambassador). He previously served as the Vice President of the Examination Yuan from 2017 to 2020.

== Education ==
Lee graduated from National Taiwan University with a bachelor's degree in political science in 1978 and a master's degree in political science in 1980. His master's degree dissertation was titled, "Global oil companies and international politics" (Chinese: 石油多國公司與國際政治).

== Journalist career ==
Lee was a reporter at the China Times from 1982 to 1983.

== Political career ==
Lee first served as assistant to the legislator Wu Shu-chen, and then he served as the Director of Publicity of the Democratic Progressive Party (DPP) from 1987 to 1988. He was then elected to the Taipei City Council since 1989 until his resignation to serve as the Director of Civil Affairs in the Taipei City Government under Mayor Chen Shui-bian's administration.

Later, Chen was elected president of Taiwan, ushering in the first time the DPP came into power. Lee first served as the Deputy Minister of the Interior and Minister of the Directorate-General of Personnel Administration for the first five years of Chen administration.

Lee served as the Secretary-General of the Democratic Progressive Party from 2005 to 2006 and returned to the central government in 2006 serving as the Minister of the Interior until the end of Chen administration in 2008.

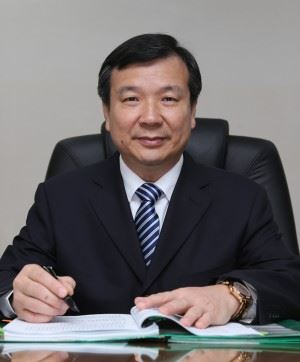
Official portrait, as Vice President of the Examination Yuan, 2017.

In 2016, the DPP came into power the second time, Lee was appointed by President Tsai Ing-wen to the Examination Yuan serving as the Minister of the Civil Service Protection and Training Commission and Vice President of the Examination Yuan.

In 2024, the DPP remained in power, Lee was presumptive to be appointed by President Lai Ching-te as the Representative of Taiwan to Japan, succeeding Frank Hsieh.
