= Yuan Tze-yu =

Politician of Taiwan

- 袁自玉

Deputy Secretary-General of Examination Yuan
- President: John Kuan
- Secretary-General: Hwang Yea-baang

Personal details
- Education: Fu Jen Catholic University (BA); University of Texas at Austin (MA)

Yuan Tze-yu (Chinese: 袁自玉; pinyin: Yuán Zìyù) is a Taiwanese politician. She currently serves as the Deputy Secretary-General of the Examination Yuan.

== Education ==
Yuan obtained her bachelor's degree from the Department of Mass Communication of Fu Jen Catholic University and her master's degree from the Department of Advertising of University of Texas at Austin in the United States.

== Political career ==
She served as a specialist at the Government Information Office, deputy director of the Department of Foreign Affairs of the Taiwan Provincial Government and counselor and director of the third division of the Research and Development Committee of the Examination Yuan, before stepping into her current position as Deputy Secretary-General of the Examination Yuan.

== See also ==
- Examination Yuan
