= Tsai Bih-hwang =

Taiwanese academic and politician (born 1945)

Tsai Bih-hwang MLY
- 蔡璧煌

Chairperson of the Civil Service Protection and Training Commission
- In office October 2010 – 20 May 2016
- Preceded by: Chang Ming-jue
- Succeeded by: Lee I-yang

Member of the Legislative Yuan
- In office 1 February 1996 – 31 January 1999
- Constituency: Republic of China
- In office 1 February 1990 – 31 January 1993
- Constituency: Education

Leader of the Institute of Revolutionary Practice
- In office 1997–2002
- Preceded by: Chuang Huai-yi (1994)
- Succeeded by: John Kuan

Personal details
- Born: 1945 (age 80–81)
- Party: Kuomintang
- Education: National Taiwan Normal University (BA, MA); Stanford University (PhD)
- Profession: Educator

Tsai Bih-hwang (Chinese: 蔡璧煌; born 1945) is a Taiwanese academic and politician. He was elected to two nonconsecutive terms on the Legislative Yuan, serving from 1990 to 1993, and 1996 to 1999. Tsai was subsequently appointed to the Examination Yuan in 2002, and led the Examination Yuan's Civil Service Protection and Training Commission between 2010 and 2016.

== Education and early career ==
Tsai graduated from National Taiwan Normal University with a bachelor's degree and a master's degree in education. He then pursued doctoral studies in the United States, earning his Ph.D. in education from Stanford University in 1985. His doctoral dissertation, completed under sociologist Sanford Dornbusch, was titled, "The relationship between the university environment and creative attitudes among Chinese graduate students in Taiwan and in the United States (cross-cultural, comparative education, student subculture)".

He has published research articles in the Journal of National Taiwan Normal University, and editorials in the Taipei Times. Tsai taught at the primary and high school levels, was a professor at National Taiwan Normal University, and served as a member or executive or executive on several organizations, including the Wenshan Rotary Club, the Republic of China Recreation Association, Ke-Tsai Family Association in Taipei, the Cerebral Palsy Association of the Republic of China, the National Education Association of the Republic of China, and the Consumer Foundation.

== Political career ==
Tsai was a member of the Legislative Yuan from 1990 to 1993. He did not win reelection in December 1992, but stood for election in December 1995 as a member of the Kuomintang proportional representation party list, and returned to the legislature. In the midst of the Third Taiwan Strait Crisis, Tsai was interviewed by The Independent about the status of Cross-Strait relations. Tsai, a member of the Kuomintang, served the party as leader of the Institute of Revolutionary Practice and headed the Culture Working Group of the Central Committee.

In 2002, Tsai was named a minister without portfolio and member of the Examination Yuan. In his Examination Yuan role, Tsai announced the passage of a new pension program for civil servants in November 2005. He was renominated for a second term in 2008. During his reconfirmation hearing, legislator Kuan Bi-ling noted that Tsai and several other nominees held a Permanent Resident Card issued by the United States. The Ma Ying-jeou presidential administration confirmed that Tsai had relinquished his residency in the United States, and he was reappointed to the Examination Yuan as a minister without portfolio. After the National Academy of Civil Service replaced the National Civil Service Institute on 26 March 2010, Tsai led the NACS as president. In October 2010, Tsai was appointed chairperson of the Civil Service Protection and Training Commission. He was renominated to lead the commission for a second term, which began on 1 September 2014. Tsai resigned from the commission in May 2016.
