= Lin Chin-sheng =

Taiwanese politician (1916–2001)

- 林金生
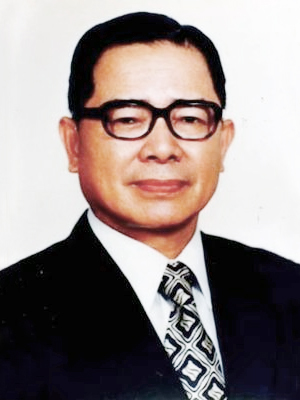
- Official portrait, 1972

9th Vice President of the Examination Yuan
- In office 1984–1993
- President: Liu Chi-hung; Kung Te-cheng; Chiu Chuang-huan
- Preceded by: Chang Tsung-liang
- Succeeded by: Mao Gao-wen

Minister without portfolio
- In office 1981–1984

Minister of Transportation and Communications of the Republic of China
- In office 11 June 1976 – 1 December 1981
- Preceded by: Henry Kao
- Succeeded by: Lien Chan

Minister of the Interior
- In office 1 June 1972 – 11 June 1976
- Preceded by: Hsu Ching-chung
- Succeeded by: Chang Feng-hsu

Yunlin County Magistrate
- In office 2 June 1954 – 2 June 1957
- Preceded by: Wu Ching-hui
- Succeeded by: Liao Chen-hsiang

Chiayi County Magistrate
- In office 1 June 1951 – 2 June 1954
- Preceded by: Position established
- Succeeded by: Lee Mao-sung

Personal details
- Born: 4 August 1916 Kagi, Tainan Prefecture, Taiwan, Empire of Japan (today Xingang, Chiayi, Taiwan)
- Died: 2001 (aged 84–85)
- Party: Kuomintang
- Children: Lin Hwai-min
- Education: Tokyo Imperial University (LLB)

Lin Chin-sheng (Chinese: 林金生; 1916–2001) was a Taiwanese politician.

== Education and career ==
Born in 1916, Lin earned a law degree from Tokyo Imperial University. Lin began his political career in his native Chiayi County, where he founded the Lin political faction and allied himself with the Kuomintang. Lin served as Chiayi County Magistrate from 1951 to 1954, when he was elected Yunlin County Magistrate, where he served another three-year term. In 1972, Lin was appointed interior minister, serving until 1976, when he was named Minister of Transportation and Communications. As transportation minister, Lin oversaw the construction of Taiwan Taoyuan International Airport. He opposed the airport's original name, Taoyuan International Airport, suggesting that it be named for Chiang Kai-shek instead. Lin stepped down as transport minister in 1981 and became a minister without portfolio. From 1984, he was the Vice President of the Examination Yuan. In 1987, Lin and his faction supported the Democratic Progressive Party's candidate for Chiayi County Magistrate, Tsai Chi-fang. He served the Examination Yuan until 1993, when he was named adviser to President Lee Teng-hui.

His son is choreographer Lin Hwai-min.
