= Chou Hung-hsien =

Taiwanese politician

- 周弘憲
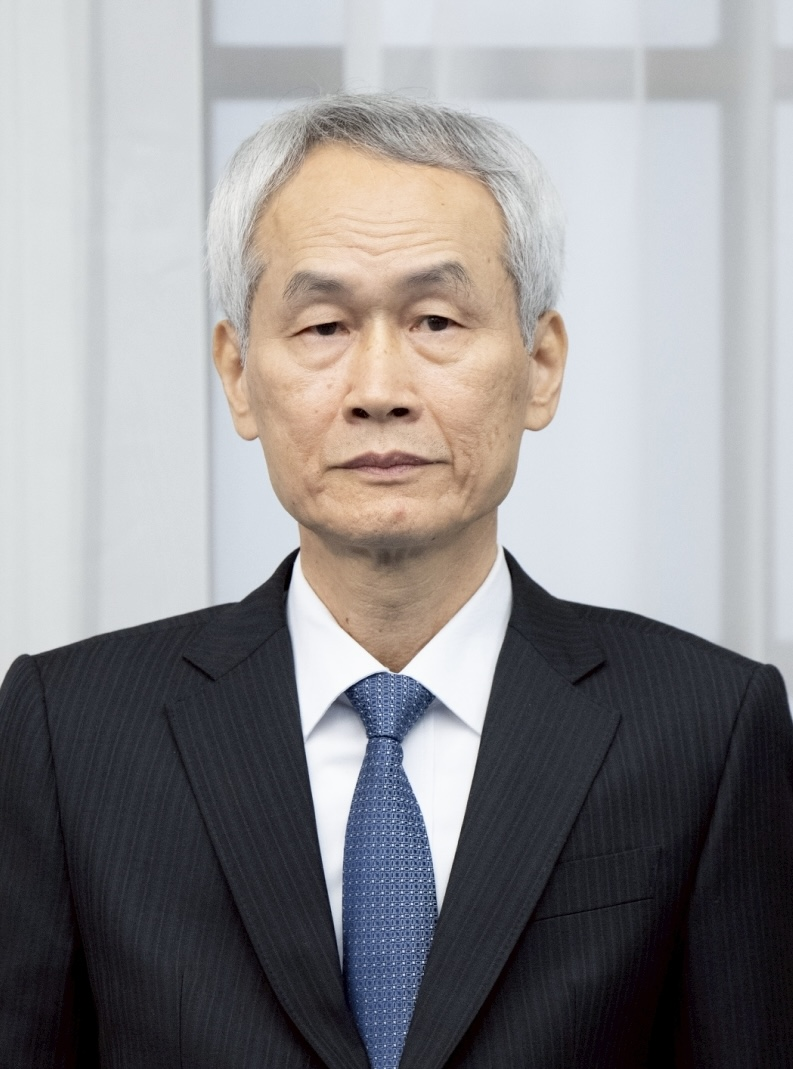
- Chou in 2026

14th President of the Examination Yuan
- Incumbent
- Assumed office 20 December 2024
- Appointed by: Lai Ching-te
- Vice President: Hsu Shu-hsiang
- Preceded by: Huang Jong-tsun
Additional positions
16th Vice President of the Examination Yuan
In office 1 September 2020 – 31 August 2024
Appointed by	Tsai Ing-wen
President	Huang Jong-tsun
Preceded by	Lee I-yang
Succeeded by	Hsu Shu-hsiang
19th Minister of Civil Service
In office 20 May 2016 – 31 August 2020
President	Wu Jin-lin
Preceded by	Chang Che-chen
Succeeded by	Chou Chih-hung
10th Minister of the Central Personnel Administration
In office 25 January 2006 – 19 May 2008
Premier	Su Tseng-chang; Chang Chun-hsiung
Preceded by	Chang Chun-yen
Succeeded by	Chen Ching-hsiu
2nd Minister of Civil Service Protection and Training Commission
In office 20 May 2000 – 24 January 2006
President	Yao Chia-wen
Preceded by	Lin Chi-yuan
Succeeded by	Liu Shou-cheng

Personal details
- Born: 23 November 1958 (age 67) Dalin, Chiayi, Taiwan
- Party: Democratic Progressive Party
- Education: National Taiwan University (LLB)
- Profession: Lawyer

Chou Hung-hsien (Chinese: 周弘憲; born 23 November 1953) is a Taiwanese lawyer and politician who has been the 14th president of the Examination Yuan since 2024.

== Education ==
After graduating from National Chiayi Senior High School in 1972, Chou studied law at National Taiwan University, where he earned his Bachelor of Laws (LL.B.) in 1976.

== Political career ==
Chou led the Civil Service Protection and Training Commission from 2000 to 2006, then moved to the Central Personnel Administration. Between 2016 and 2020, Chou led the Ministry of Civil Service.

In May 2020, Tsai Ing-wen nominated Chou to serve as vice president of the Examination Yuan. The nomination was approved in a Legislative Yuan vote two months later, despite criticism from the New Power Party that Examination Yuan nominees had not responded to the party's inquiries. Before taking office, Chou opined that the Examination Yuan should respect the legislature and public opinion.

In May 2024, Lai Ching-te promoted Chou to president of the Examination Yuan. While undergoing legislative questioning on his presidential nomination, Chou vowed to focus on anti-bullying initiatives, and advised the Legislative Yuan to consider amendments proposed by the Examination Yuan to the Civil Servant Association Act, which would expand union rights. The legislature voted to approve Chou's elevation to president of the Examination Yuan in December 2024.
