= Hsu Wen-tsu =

Taiwanese politician

- 許文志
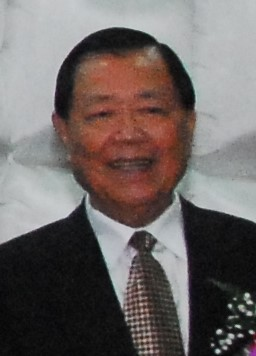

Yunlin County Magistrate
- In office 20 December 1981 – 20 December 1989
- Preceded by: Lin Heng-sheng
- Succeeded by: Liao Chuan-yu

Personal details
- Born: 30 September 1936 (age 89)
- Party: Kuomintang

Hsu Wen-tsu (Chinese: 許文志; born 30 September 1936) is a Taiwanese politician.

Hsu Wen-tsu led the Kuomintang-affiliated Hsu family faction in Yunlin County. He served two terms as Yunlin County Magistrate from 1981 to 1989, before accepting an appointment to lead the Taiwan Provincial Government's Department of Reconstruction in 1990. Hsu was named secretary-general of the provincial government in 1994. He retired from politics in 2000, ending his career as one of President Lee Teng-hui's national policy advisers. Within the Kuomintang, Hsu had served as director of the Department of Organization.

One of Hsu's sons, Hsu Shu-po, served on the Legislative Yuan. Another son, Hsu Shu-hsiang, was president of TransWorld University.
