= Chou Ching-yu =

Taiwanese politician

Chou Ching-yu MLY
- 周清玉
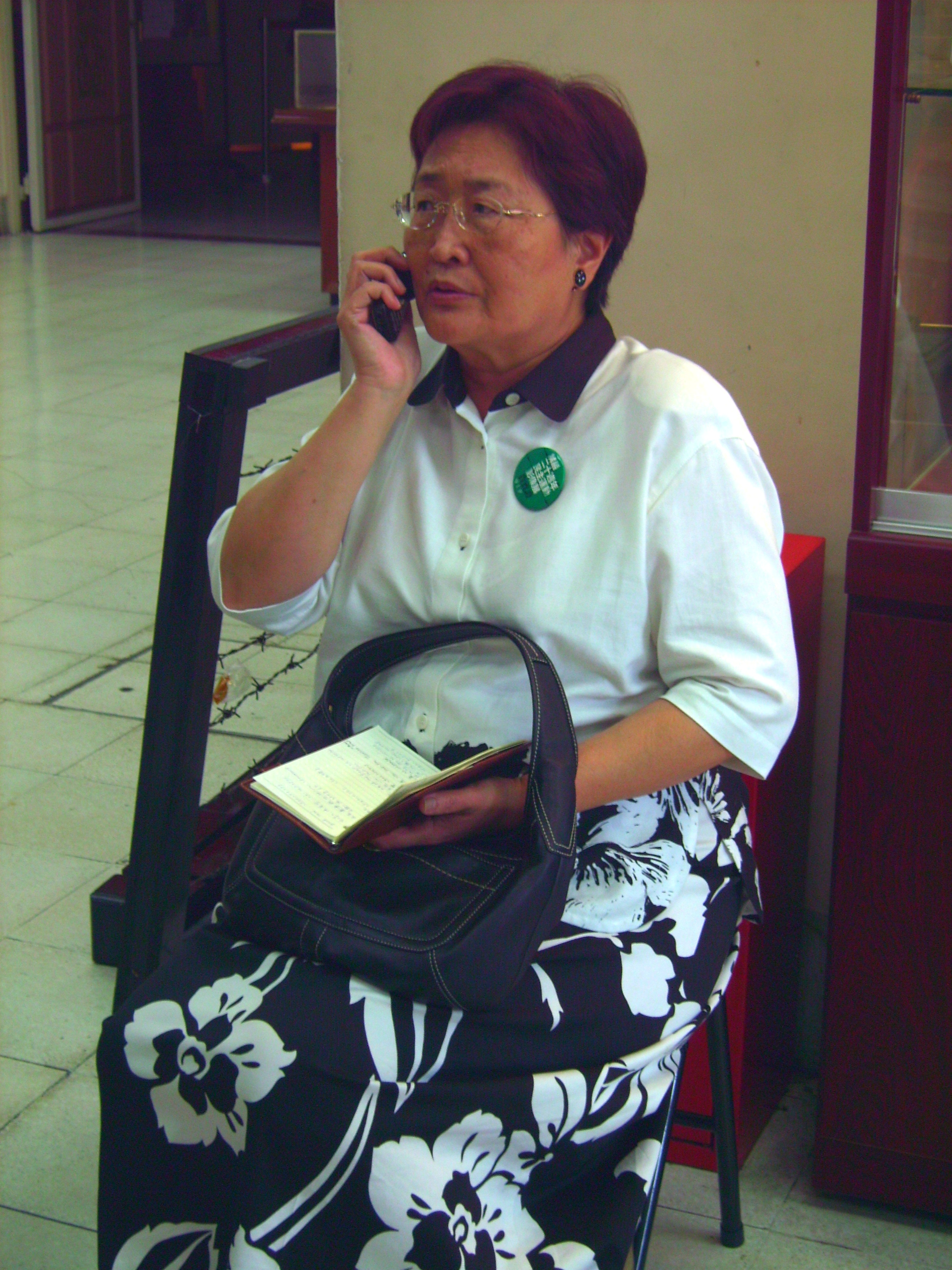
- Chou in July 2007

Member of the Legislative Yuan
- In office 1 February 2002 – 31 January 2005
- Constituency: Changhua County
- In office 1 February 1999 – 31 January 2002
- Constituency: Taiwan (Republic of China)

Member of the Taiwan Provincial Consultative Council
- In office 1994–1998

Changhua County Magistrate
- In office 20 December 1989 – 20 December 1993
- Preceded by: George Huang
- Succeeded by: Juan Kang-meng

Member of the National Assembly
- In office 1 February 1981 – 31 January 1992

Personal details
- Born: 12 June 1944 (age 82) Tainan Prefecture, Taiwan, Empire of Japan
- Party: Democratic Progressive Party (since 1986)
- Spouse: Yao Chia-wen
- Occupation: Politician

Chou Ching-yu (Chinese: 周清玉; pinyin: Zhōu Qīngyù; born 12 June 1944) is a Taiwanese politician.

== Political career ==
Chou served in the National Assembly from 1981 to 1992. In her first electoral win, she earned the highest number of total votes. She achieved a similar milestone in her 1986 reelection campaign, claiming 125,283 votes, most in the district of Taipei. In May, Chou and Hsu Jung-shu were invited to the United States and addressed the US Congressional Committee for Democracy on Taiwan.

Chou served as magistrate of Changhua County from 1989 to 1993 and was a member of the Taiwan Provincial Consultative Council between 1994 and 1998. She was elected to the Legislative Yuan via party list proportional representation later that year, but won reelection by running for a district seat in 2001. As a lawmaker, she supported environmentalism and women's rights. In 2004, Chou proposed a bill to offer a more stringent legal definition of unwelcome sexual contact. The next year, she backed a bill that mandated the use of tracking technology on paroled sex offenders. Chou also proposed initiatives to lessen employment discrimination against people with mental health problems. Shortly before stepping down from the Legislative Yuan at the end of her term in 2005, Chou announced that she was running for the party leadership, a position that eventually went to Su Tseng-chang. Subsequently, Chou was named to the Presidium of the fourth National Assembly, representing the Democratic Progressive Party. She also served on the DPP's Central Standing Committee. By 2008, Chou had become president of the Taiwan Coalition Against Violence. From this position, she advocated for awareness of domestic violence against women, and supported a wage increase for social workers. By 2014, Chou was the director-general of the Taiwanese Mother Language League.

== Personal life ==
Chou is married to Yao Chia-wen.
