= Tung Pao-cheng =

Taiwanese politician (born 1951)

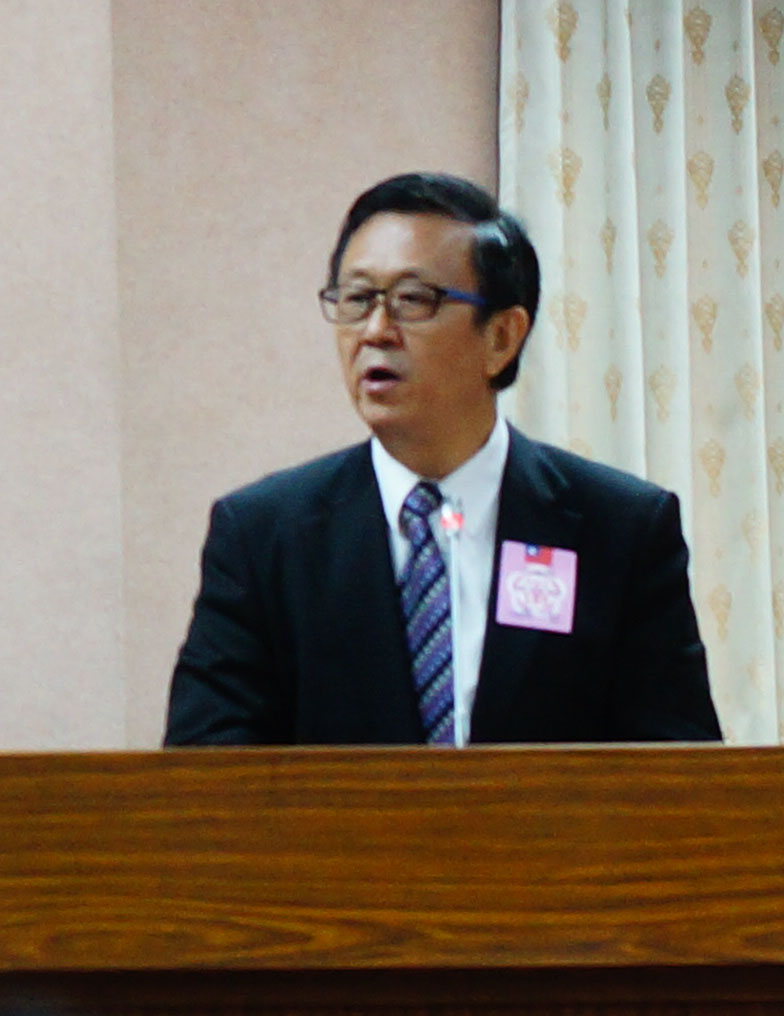
Tung Pao-cheng

Tung Pao-cheng or Dung Bau-tscheng (Chinese: 董保城; pinyin: Dǒng Bǎochéng; Wade–Giles: Tung^{3} Pao^{3}-cheng^{2}; born 1951) is a Taiwanese legal scholar and politician who was the Taiwanese minister of Examination from 2012 to 2015.

== Career ==
Tung Pao-cheng graduated from the Department of Law at Soochow University. Subsequently, he pursued postgraduate study in the subject at the University of Bonn in Germany, culminating in a Doctor of Laws degree, after which Tung returned to Taiwan and began teaching at Soochow. He then became a professor of law at National Chengchi University. Beginning in September 2008, Tung served as a vice minister of examination. He succeeded Lai Feng-wei as Minister of Examination in March 2012, following Lai's resignation the previous month. While in office, Tung commented favorably on the passage rate of older and better educated examinees, stating that having such test takers in the talent pool would improve the quality of public sector workers. In July 2013, Yeh Kou became the first passing examinee to file a lawsuit against the Ministry of Examination, then under Tung's leadership. In July 2014, Tung drew attention to qualified but unemployed lawyers in Taiwan, attributing the situation to the increase in legal studies programs, and the lowering of standards by the Ministry of Education. Tung resigned as minister of examination in July 2015, yielding the office to Chiou Hwa-jiun. Tung later joined the faculty of Chinese Cultural University as a history professor. He then became chair professor of law and vice president of Soochow University.

== Awards and honors ==
In April 2018, the German Institute Taipei awarded Tung the German-Taiwanese Friendship Medal.
