= Dai Jitao =

Chinese politician (1891–1949)

- 戴季陶
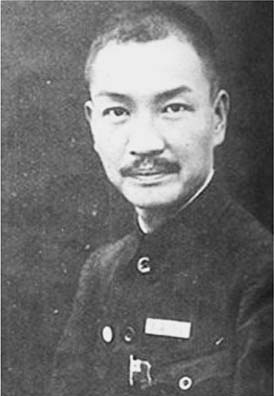

President of the Examination Yuan
- In office 25 October 1928 – 30 June 1948
- Preceded by: Position established
- Succeeded by: Zhang Boling

Personal details
- Born: Dai Liangbi; 6 January 1891 Guanghan, Sichuan, Qing Empire
- Died: 21 February 1949 (aged 58) Guangzhou, China
- Party: Kuomintang
- Spouses: Niu Youheng; Zhao Wenshu
- Domestic partners: Zhao Lingyi; Michiko Tsubuchi; Shigematsu Kaneko
- Children: Dai Jiachang; Tai An-kuo; Chiang Wei-kuo
- Education: Nihon University (LLB)

Dai Jitao or Tai Chi-t'ao (Chinese: 戴季陶; pinyin: Dài Jìtáo; January 6, 1891 – February 21, 1949) was a Chinese journalist, an early Kuomintang member and far-right politician, and the first head of the Examination Yuan of the Republic of China. He is often referred to as Dai Chuanxian (Chinese: 戴傳賢; Wade–Giles: Tai Ch'uan-hsien) or by his other courtesy name, Dai Xuantang (Chinese: 戴選堂; Wade–Giles: Tai Hsüan-t'ang).

== Early life and education ==
Dai was born Dai Liangbi (Chinese: 戴良弼; Wade–Giles: Tai Liang-pi) in Guanghan, Sichuan to a family of potters. He went to Japan in 1905 to study in a normal school and entered Nihon University's law program in 1907. He graduated and returned to China in 1909.

== Writings ==
Dai started to write for the Shanghaiese China Foreign Daily (中外日報) and Tianduo Newspaper (天鐸報) at 19. At this time, his sobriquet for himself was Dai Tianchou (天仇), or Heaven-Revenge Dai, to signify his dissatisfaction for the Qing Empire. The Qing officials threatened him with imprisonment for his writings, so in 1911 he fled to Japan, and then to Penang, where he joined Tongmenghui and wrote for its Guanghua Newspaper (光華報). Later that year, he returned to Shanghai after the Wuchang Uprising and founded the Democracy Newspaper (民權報).

== Political career ==
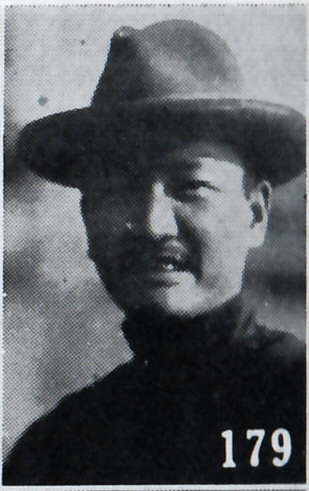
Dai Jitao as pictured in The Most Recent Biographies of Chinese Dignitaries

Dai's fluency in Japanese, unusual for a Chinese young man, attracted the attention of Sun Yat-sen. He became Sun's translator and then his confidential secretary. After the Kuomintang failed to overthrow Yuan Shikai, he went to Tokyo to join the Chinese Revolutionary Party in 1914.

He attended the first national congress of the Chinese Kuomintang in 1924, where he was elected a member of the Central Executive Committee, then later a member of the Standing Committee, and the Minister of Propaganda. Soon after Sun's death in 1925, he published a controversial book that reinterpreted Sun's legacy. He claimed Sun derived his ideology chiefly from Confucianism instead of Western philosophies and that Sun was a traditionalist. This was praised by the KMT's right-wing but condemned by leftists and communists. After the right's triumph, Dai's interpretation became the dominant one within the KMT. In 1926, he served as principal of the Sun Yat-sen University, and the chief of politics at Whampoa Academy, with Zhou Enlai as his deputy. From 1928 until 1948, he served as head of the Examination Yuan.

From October 1928 to June 1948, his official positions consisted of:

- State Councillor (國民政府國府委員)
- Director-General of Sun Yat-sen University (中山大學委員長)
- Member of Kuomintang Central Executive Committee (中央執行委員會委員): 1924
  - Member of Standing Committee (常務委員): 1924
- Minister of Information (宣傳部長): 1924
- President of the Academia Historica (國史館館長): unable to attend due to illness

Dai was one of the lyricists of "National Anthem of the Republic of China". He also wrote:

- The Fundamentals of the Principles of Sun Yat-sen (孫文主義之哲學基礎)
- The People's Revolution and Kuomintang (國民革命與中國國民黨)
- The Complete Book of Sun Yat-sen (孫中山全書)
- National Flag Anthem of the Republic of China (中華民國國旗歌)

== Later years and death ==
After Sun Yat-sen's death in 1925, Dai changed his name to Chuanxian, Continuing-Virtue. He jumped into a river and was rescued by a fisherman. After this suicide experience, he converted to Buddhism and was accused by many of being superstitious. His works about Buddhism are published in The Collection of Mr. Dai Jitao's Discussions on Buddhism (戴季陶先生佛學論集). He was widely known to be the birth father of Chiang Wei-kuo, the adoptive second son of Chiang Kai-shek. According to popular speculation, Dai believed knowledge of his extramarital affairs with the Japanese woman Shigematsu Kaneko would destroy his marriage and his career, so he entrusted Wei-kuo to Chiang Kai-shek, after the Japanese Yamada Juntaro (山田純太郎) brought the infant to Shanghai. Yao Yecheng (姚冶誠), Chiang's wife at the time, raised Wei-kuo as her own. The boy called Dai his "Dear Uncle" (親伯). Dai had also fathered a son, An-kuo (安國), whom Dai later sent to Germany, to be educated at the Technische Hochschule in Charlottenburg (now Technische Universität Berlin). An-kuo (Ango) and Chiang Wei-kuo (Wego) were half brothers.

In 1949, with the Kuomintang losing the Chinese Civil War to the Chinese Communist Party, Dai committed suicide by swallowing over 70 sleeping pills in Guangzhou.

== See also ==
- Dai Jitao Thought
- Western Hills Group
