= Hwang Yea-baang =

Politician from Taiwan

- 黃雅榜

Secretary-General of Examination Yuan
- In office 1 April 2010 – August 2014
- President: John Kuan
- Deputy: Yuan Tze-yu
- Preceded by: Lin Shui-ji
- Succeeded by: Lee Jih-shyuan

Hwang Yea-baang (Chinese: 黃雅榜; pinyin: Huáng Yǎbǎng) is a Taiwanese politician. He was the Secretary-General of the Examination Yuan.

== Political careers ==
Hwang was promoted to be the secretary-general of Examination Yuan on 1 April 2010, succeeding Lin Shui-ji who resigned from the position for health reasons. He was succeeded by Lee Jih-shyuan in August 2014.
