= Regional Civil Service Development Institute =

Government agency of Taiwan

Coordinates: 23.937528°N 120.703523°E

- 行政院人事行政總處地方行政研習中心

Agency overview
- Formed: July 1956 (as Taiwan Province Training Corps); July 1999 (as Regional Civil Service Development Institute)
- Jurisdiction: Taiwan (ROC)
- Headquarters: Nantou City, Nantou County
- Parent agency: Directorate-General of Personnel Administration
- Website: Official website

The Regional Civil Service Development Institute (traditional Chinese: 行政院人事行政總處地方行政研習中心; simplified Chinese: 行政院人事行政总处地方行政研习中心; pinyin: Xíngzhèngyuàn Rénshì Xíngzhèng Zǒngchǔ Dìfāng Xíngzhèng Yánxí Zhōngxīn) is the agency of the Directorate-General of Personnel Administration of the Executive Yuan of the Taiwan (ROC) responsible for the training of local public servants.

== History ==
The institute was originally established in July 1956 as Taiwan Province Training Corps in Taipei. In May 1997, it was renamed to Department of Civil Human Resources, Training and Development and moved to Zhongxing New Village, Nantou City, Nantou County. In July 1999, it was finally renamed as Regional Civil Service Development Institute (Chinese: 行政院人事行政總處地方行政研習中心).

== Organizational structure ==
- Education and Development Division
- Counseling and Extension Division
- eLearning Division
- Secretariat Office
- Personnel Office
- Accounting Office

== See also ==
- Government of the Republic of China
  - Executive Yuan
    - Directorate-General of Personnel Administration
      - Civil Service Development Institute
  - Examination Yuan
    - Ministry of Examination
    - Ministry of Civil Service (Taiwan)
    - Civil Service Protection and Training Commission
