= Civil Service Development Institute =

Government agency of the Republic of China

Coordinates: 25.023532°N 121.534276°E

- 行政院人事行政總處公務人力發展中心
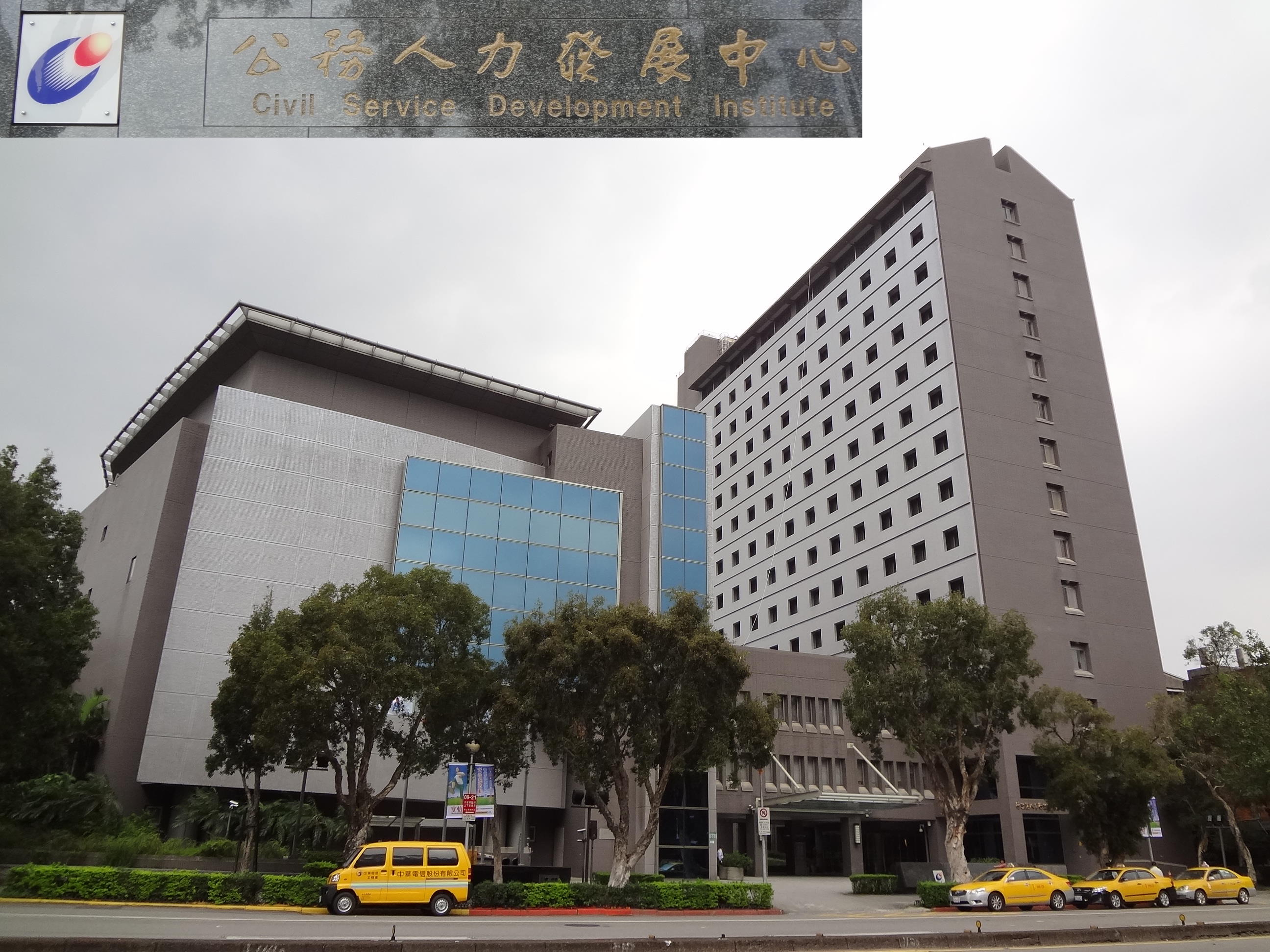

Agency overview
- Formed: 1968 (as Training Center for Government Officials); 7 July 2017 (as CSDI)
- Headquarters: Da'an, Taipei, Taiwan
- Employees: 53
- Parent agency: Directorate-General of Personnel Administration
- Website: Official website

The Civil Service Development Institute (CSDI; Chinese: 行政院人事行政總處公務人力發展中心; pinyin: Xíngzhèngyuàn Rénshì Xíngzhèng Zǒngchù Gōngwù Rénlì Fāzhǎn Zhōngxīn) is the agency of the Directorate-General of Personnel Administration of the Executive Yuan of the Taiwan (ROC) responsible to provide continuing learning for civil servants in Taiwan.

== History ==
CSDI was originally established in 1968 as Training Center for Government Officials. On 19 April 2017, the Organization Act of Civil Service Development Institute was promulgated. On 31 March 2017, it was passed in the Legislative Yuan and it went into enforcement on 7 July 2017. On 19 June 2017, the Executive Yuan approved the Civil Service Development Institute and it was formally established on 7 July 2017.

== Organizational structure ==
- Educational Affairs Division
- Counseling Division
- Research Division
- Secretariat
- Personnel Office
- Accounting Office

== See also ==
- Government of the Republic of China
  - Executive Yuan
    - Directorate-General of Personnel Administration
      - Regional Civil Service Development Institute
  - Examination Yuan
    - Ministry of Examination
    - Ministry of Civil Service (Taiwan)
    - Civil Service Protection and Training Commission
