= Hsu Shu-hsiang =

Taiwanese politician (born 1961)

- 許舒翔
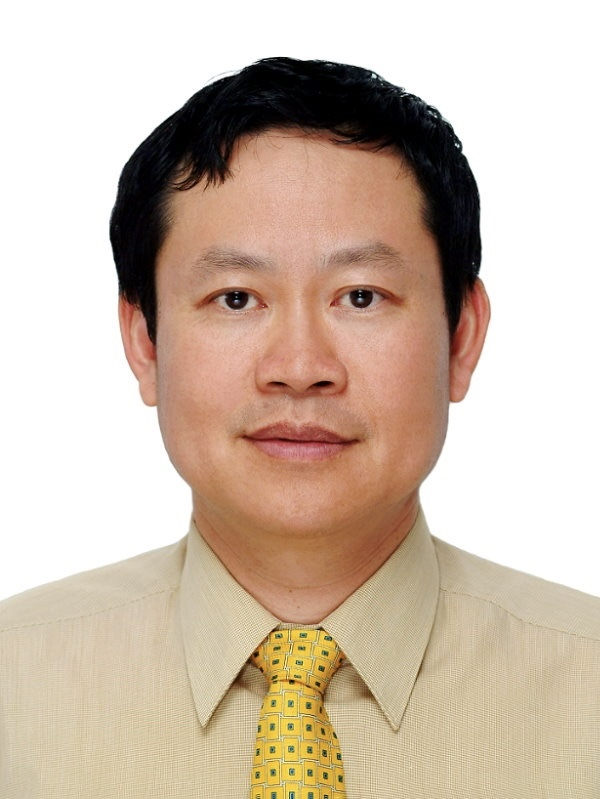
- Official portrait, 2021

17th Vice President of the Examination Yuan
- Incumbent
- Assumed office 20 December 2024
- Appointed by: Lai Ching-te
- President: Chou Hung-hsien
- Preceded by: Chou Hung-hsien

19th Minister of Examination
- In office 1 October 2019 – 20 May 2024
- President: Wu Jin-lin; Huang Jong-tsun
- Preceded by: Tsai Tzung-jen
- Succeeded by: Lio Mon-chi

Personal details
- Born: 22 April 1961 (age 65) Taixi, Yunlin, Taiwan
- Party: Independent
- Other political affiliations: People First Party (2015); Kuomintang (until 2000)
- Parent: Hsu Wen-tsu (father)
- Education: Soochow University (BA); Ohio University (MA); Colorado State University (PhD)

Hsu Shu-hsiang (Chinese: 許舒翔; born 22 April 1961) is a Taiwanese political scientist and politician. In December 2024, he became the incumbent Vice President of the Examination Yuan.

== Early life and education ==
Hsu was born in Taixi, Yunlin. He is the eldest son of politician Hsu Wen-tsu. His younger brother, Hsu Shu-po, was a member of the Legislative Yuan from 1996 to 2012.

Hsu graduated from Soochow University with a Bachelor of Arts in political science in 1989. He then pursued graduate studies in the United States, earning a Master of Arts from Ohio University in 1989 and then his Ph.D. in political science from Colorado State University in 1994. His doctoral dissertation was titled, "Water resources protection in Taiwan: A case study of the Taipei Water Management Commission".

== Academic career ==
After receiving his doctorate, Hsu was a visiting associate professor of political science at Colorado State University from 2002 to 2004. He headed the educational institution TransWorld University twice, and had overseen it through three name changes.

== Political career ==
Hsu Shu-hsiang was named parliamentary secretary of the Ministry of Examination in 2016, and took office as Minister of Examination on 1 October 2019. While serving in this role, Hsu commented on the ages of examinees assessed by the examination ministry.

In May 2024, president Lai Ching-te nominated Hsu to serve as Vice President of the Examination Yuan. The Legislative Yuan approved Hsu's nomination in December.
