= Directorate-General of Personnel Administration =

Republic of China government agency

- 人事行政總處; Rénshì Xíngzhèng Zǒngchù (Mandarin); Ngìn-sṳ Hàng-chṳn Chúng-chhú (Hakka)
- Logo of the DGPA

Agency overview
- Formed: 16 September 1967
- Jurisdiction: Republic of China (Taiwan)
- Headquarters: Zhongzheng, Taipei
- Ministers responsible: Su Chun-jung, Minister; Hwai Hsu, Lee Ping-chou, Deputy Ministers
- Parent agency: Executive Yuan
- Website: www.dgpa.gov.tw

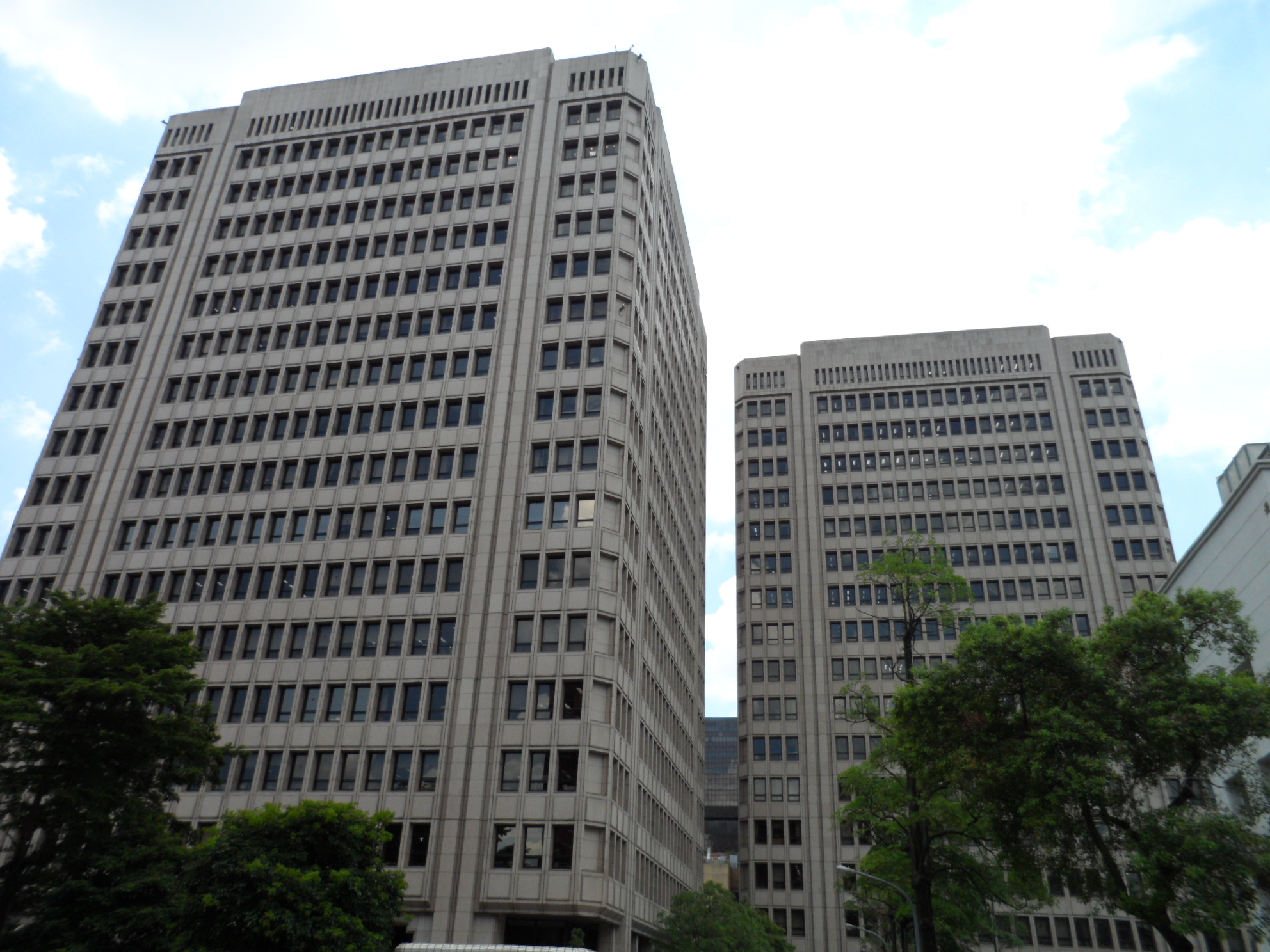
Directorate-General of Personnel Administration

The Directorate-General of Personnel Administration of the Executive Yuan (DGPA; Chinese: 行政院人事行政總處; pinyin: Xíngzhèngyuàn Rénshì Xíngzhèng Zǒngchù; Pe̍h-ōe-jī: Hêng-chèng-īⁿ Jîn-sū Hêng-chèng Chóng-chhù) of the Republic of China (Taiwan) is a government body responsible for the overall personnel administration of all ministries and agencies under the Executive Yuan.

== History ==
The agency was established on 16 September 1967 as the Central Personnel Administration (Chinese: 行政院人事行政局) in a ceremony presided by Premier Yen Chia-kan. It adopts its current name on 6 February 2012.

== Organizational structure ==
- Department of Planning
- Department of Organization and Manpower
- Department of Training and Employment
- Department of Remuneration and Welfare
- Department of Information Management
- Secretariat
- Personnel Office
- Accounting Office
- Civil Service Ethics Office

== Agencies ==
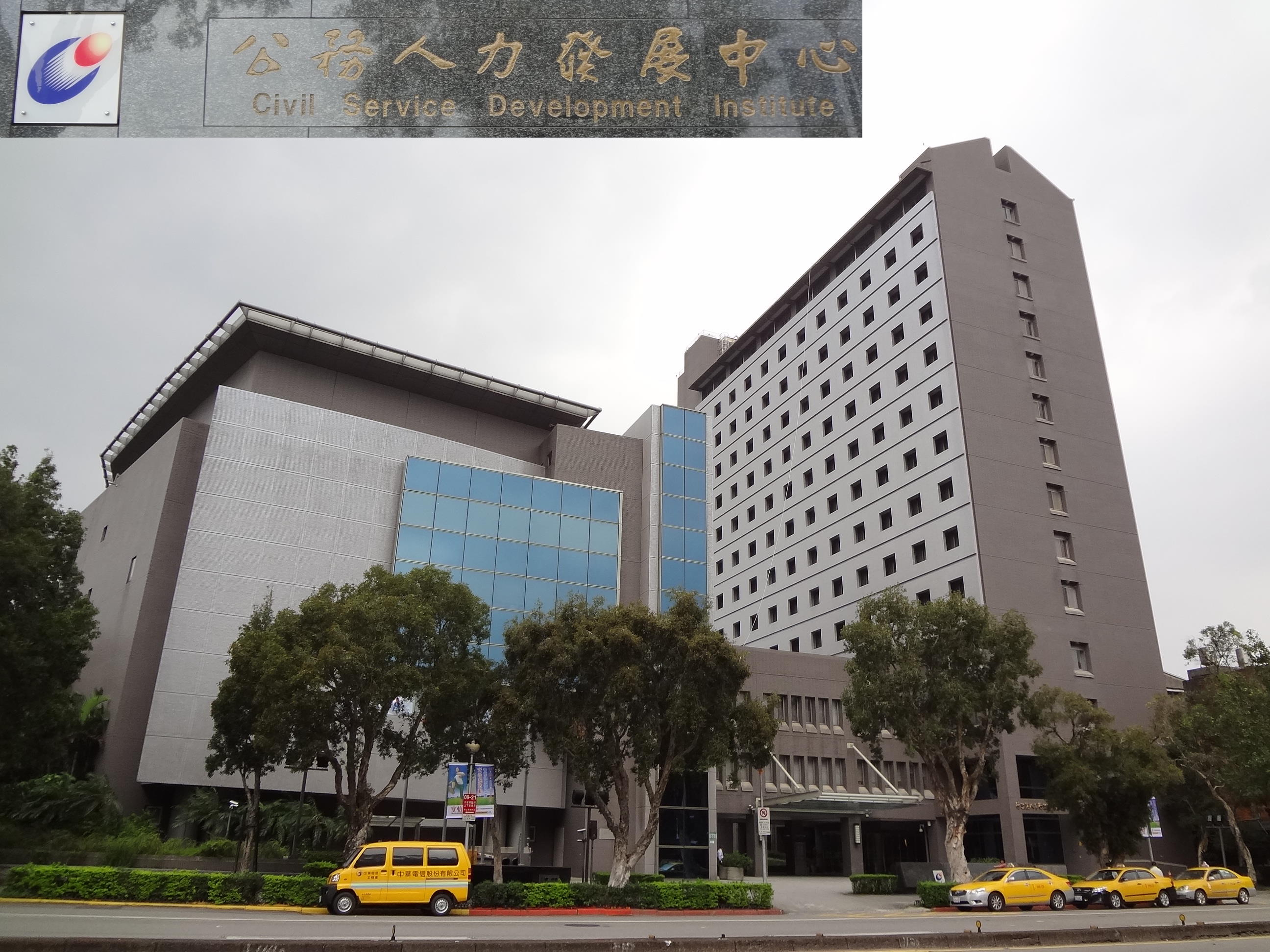
Civil Service Development Institute

- Civil Service Development Institute
- Regional Civil Service Development Institute

== Ministers ==
Political parties: Kuomintang Democratic Progressive Party Non-partisan/ unknown

No.	Name	Term of Office		Days	Party	Cabinet
Minister of the Central Personnel Administration
1	Wang Cheng-yi (王正誼)	16 September 1967	31 May 1972	1720	Kuomintang	Yen Chia-kan
2	Chen Kuei-hua (陳桂華)	1 June 1972	19 September 1984	4494	Kuomintang	Chiang Ching-kuo; Sun Yun-suan; Yu Kuo-hua
3	Pu Ta-hai (卜達海)	20 September 1984	26 February 1993	3082	Kuomintang	Yu Kuo-hua; Lee Huan; Hau Pei-tsun
4	Chen Kang-chin (陳庚金)	27 February 1993	31 August 1997	1647	Kuomintang	Lien Chan
5	Wea Chi-lin (魏啟林)	1 September 1997	14 June 1999	651		Vincent Siew
6	Chang Che-chen (張哲琛)	15 June 1999	19 May 2000	341	Kuomintang	Vincent Siew
7	Chu Wu-hsien (朱武獻)	20 May 2000	31 January 2002	622	Democratic Progressive Party	Tang Fei; Chang Chun-hsiung I
8	Lee I-yang (李逸洋)	1 February 2002	31 January 2005	1096	Democratic Progressive Party	Yu Shyi-kun
9	Chang Chun-yen (張俊彥)	1 February 2005	24 January 2006	358		Frank Hsieh
10	Chou Hung-hsien (周弘憲)	25 January 2006	19 May 2008	846	Democratic Progressive Party	Su Tseng-chang I Chang Chun-hsiung II
11	Chen Ching-hsiu (陳清秀)	20 May 2008	9 September 2009	478		Liu Chao-shiuan
Minister of the Directorate-General of Personnel Administration (since 6 February 2012)
1	Wu Tai-cheng (吳泰成)	10 September 2009	27 March 2012	930		Wu Den-yih; Sean Chen
2	Huang Fu-yuan (黃富源)	28 March 2012	19 May 2016	1514		Sean Chen; Jiang Yi-huah; Mao Chi-kuo; Chang San-cheng
3	Jay N. Shih (施能傑)	20 May 2016	10 February 2022	2092	Independent	Lin Chuan; William Lai; Su Tseng-chang II
3	Su Chun-jung (蘇俊榮)	10 February 2022	Incumbent	1640	Independent	Su Tseng-chang II; Chen Chien-jen

== Transportation ==
The building is accessible within walking distance South West from Shandao Temple Station of the Taipei Metro.

== See also ==
- Government of the Republic of China
  - Examination Yuan
    - Ministry of Examination
    - Ministry of Civil Service (Taiwan)
    - Civil Service Protection and Training Commission
