= Shui Zi =

Chinese politician (1884–1973)

Shui Zi (June 28, 1884 – February 4, 1973), courtesy name Chu Qin, native of Lanzhou, Gansu, was educator and politician during the Republic of China. He participated with the Tongmenghui during the Xinhai Revolution. Afterwards he joined the Kuomintang and served in a variety of political posts in local and national government.

In 1947, he was elected as a National Assembly member for in Yuzhong County, Gansu Province, and went to Nanjing to attend the first National Assembly, proposed and won various examinations by the provincial quotas bill. The following year, during a meeting in Nanjing, Deng Baoshan advised him to distance himself from the KMT. Afterwards Shui Zi rejected Zhang Boling's request for him to serve as an examination committee member of the Examination Yuan.
