= Cha Liang-chao =

- 查良釗
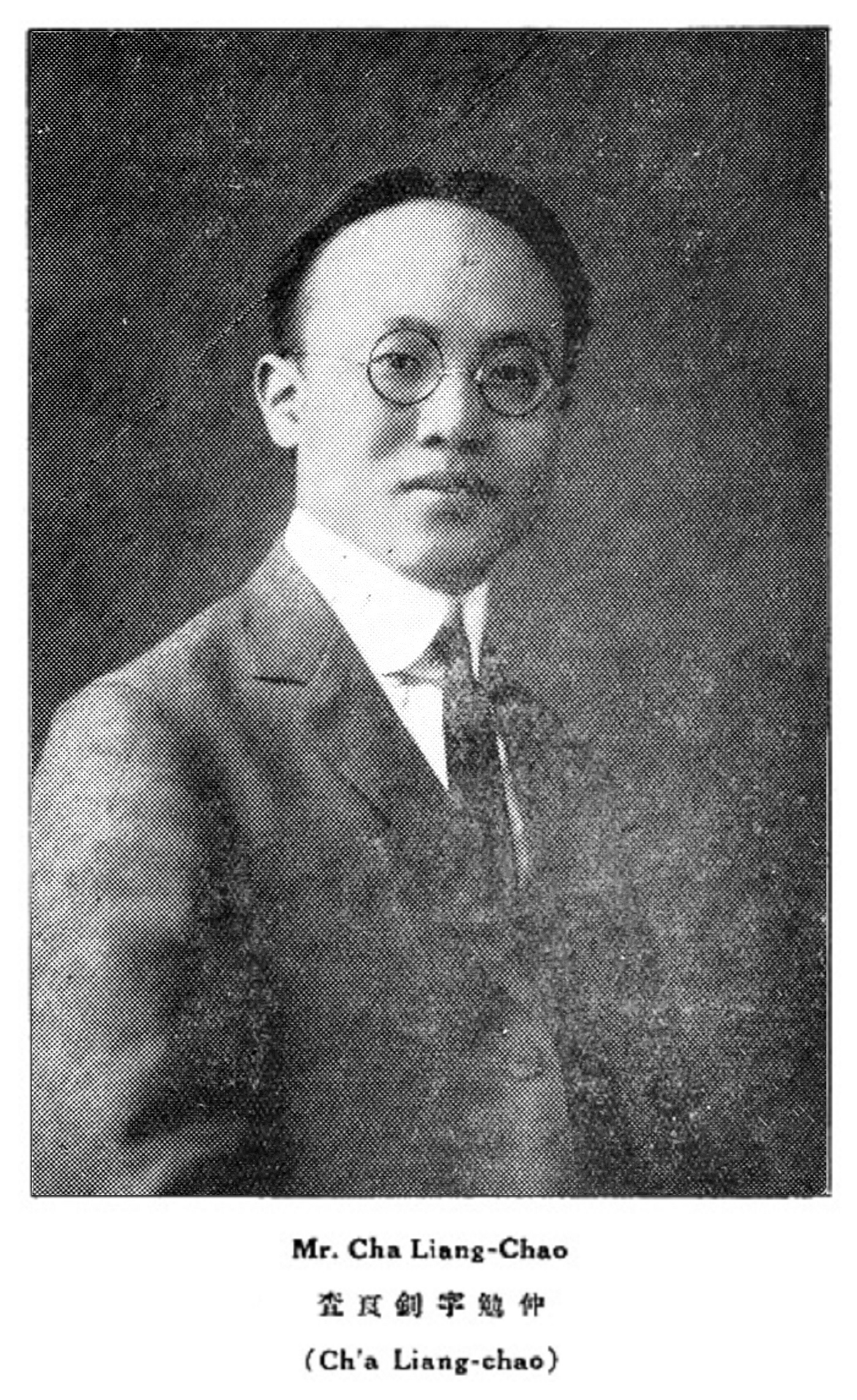
- Born: 1897; Tianjin, China
- Died: 12 December 1982 (aged 84–85)
- Education: Tsinghua College

Cha Liang-chao (Chinese: 查良釗; pinyin: Zhā Liángzhāo; Wade–Giles: Cha Liang-chao; 1897 – 12 December 1982) was a Taiwanese educator and philanthropist.

== Life ==
Cha was born in 1897 in Tianjin but his family roots were from Haining, Zhejiang. He was a paternal cousin of the wuxia novelist Louis Cha, who is better known as Jin Yong.

Cha graduated from Nankai Middle School in 1913 and from Tsinghua College in 1917. He taught at Tsinghua Middle School from 1917 to 1918.

Cha went to the United States in August 1918 and attended Grinnell College and the University of Chicago. He lectured for the Chautauqua Association, Swarthmore, Pa. on Chinese subjects in the summer of 1920. He attended Teachers' College, Columbia University from 1920 to 1922, and received a Master of Arts from Columbia University in June 1921 after doing research work in the Department of Educational Administration.

Cha was also the chairman of the executive committee of the Chinese Students' Committee on the Washington Conference.

Cha returned to China in July 1922 and became a Professor of Education in Peking Teachers College (now Beijing Normal University) in August 1922. He was elected by the Faculty Council as the Acting Dean of Studies in May 1923; Lecturer in the Summer School of Nankai University in 1923; and Director of the Institute for the Application of Scientific Measurement on Education, under the auspices of the National Association for the Advancement of Education in August 1923.

In January 1924, Cha was appointed by President Fan Yuan-Lien as Professor of Education and Dean of Studies. He authored the "Survey Educational Tests" published by the Commercial Press in 1928.
