= TransWorld University =

University in Douliu, Yunlin, Taiwan

- 環球科技大學
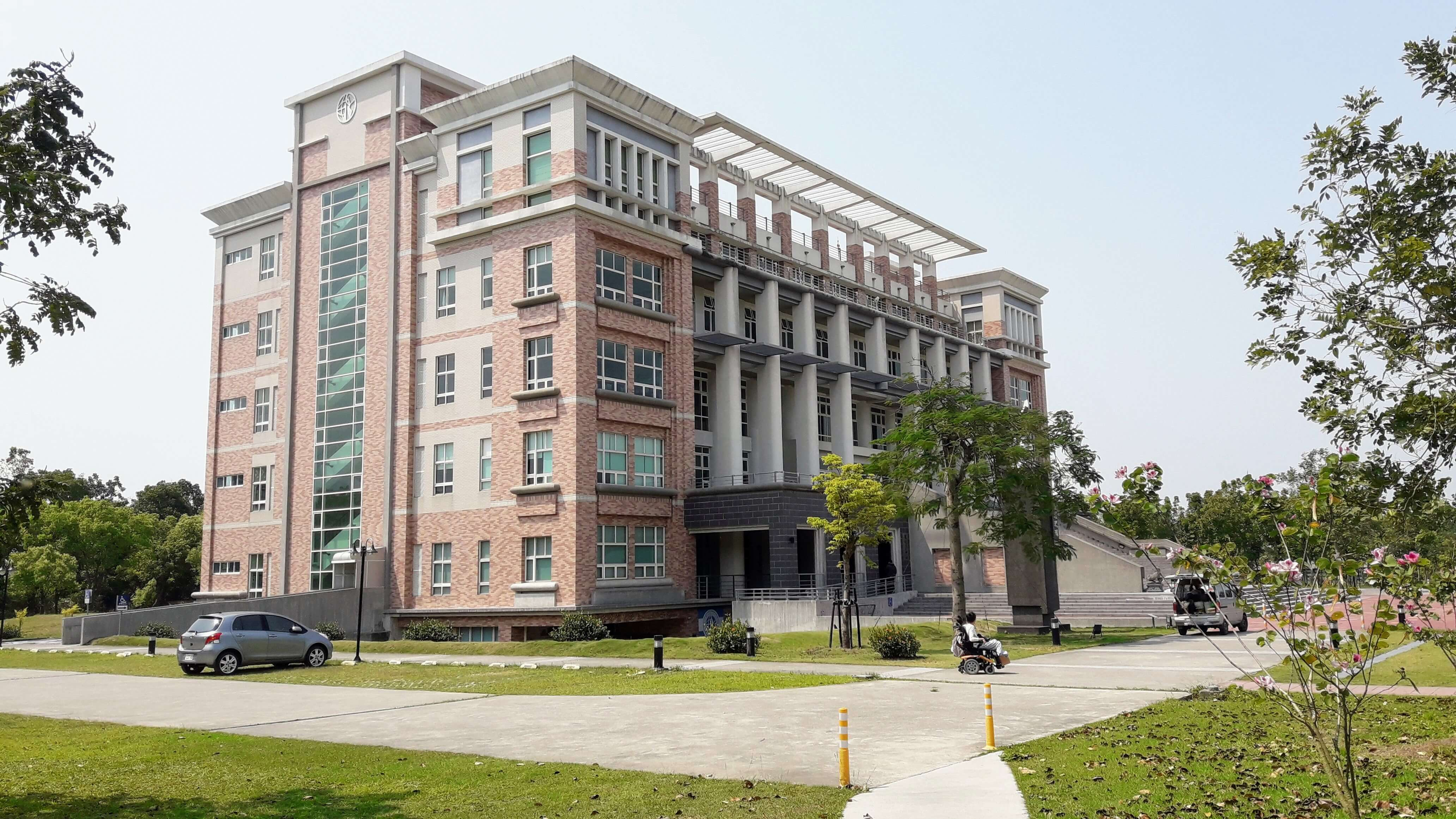
- Former names: Transworld Junior College of Commerce; Transworld Institute of Technology
- Motto in English: Cherish Honesty, Practice Integrity
- Type: Private university
- Active: 1992 (as Transworld Junior College of Commerce); 1 August 2010 (as TWU)–31 July 2024
- President: Chen I-hsing
- Students: 6,000
- Location: Douliu, Yunlin, Taiwan; 23.6809°N 120.5536°E
- Website: Official website

TransWorld University
- Traditional Chinese: 環球科技大學
- Simplified Chinese: 环球科技大学
Transcriptions
Standard Mandarin
- Hanyu Pinyin: Huánqiú Kējì Dàxué
Southern Min
- Hokkien POJ: Khoân-kiû Kho-ki Tāi-ha̍k

TransWorld University (TWU; Chinese: 環球科技大學; Pe̍h-ōe-jī: Khoân-kiû Kho-ki Tāi-ha̍k) was a private university in Douliu City, Yunlin County, Taiwan.

TWU offered undergraduate, graduate, and doctoral programs in a variety of fields, including business, design, humanities, and technology. The university also offered international programs in which students can study abroad in countries such as the United States, Canada, Australia, and Japan.

== History ==
TWU was founded in 1992 as Transworld Junior College of Commerce. In 2000, it was upgraded to Transworld Institute of Technology. Finally on 1 August 2010, the institute was approved to be the TransWorld University. On 17 March 2015, TWU signed a Memorandum of Understanding (MOU) with VTAR Institute (VTAR), Malaysia to allow VTAR graduates from Beauty Therapy or Hairdressing further studies. In 2020, the university had an enrollment rate of less than 60%. It was scheduled to shut down on July 31, 2024, and the university stopped all operations that day.

== Faculties ==
- College of Design
- College of Health Science
- College of Management
- College of Hospitality and Tourism

== Campus ==
The university campus building is constructed on land that belongs to the Taiwan Sugar Corporation.

== Presidents ==
- Chen Xin-zhang (1992–1994)
- Zeng Ruo-ying (1994–1995)
- Lai Shin-sheng (1995–1996)
- Hsu Shu-hsiang (1996–2002)
- Peng Tso-kwei (2002–2004)
- Lin Ming-fung (2004–2006)
- Hsu Shu-hsiang (2006–2016)
- Chen I-hsing (2016–2024)

== Transportation ==
The university is accessible within walking distance South of Douliu Station of Taiwan Railway.

== See also ==
- List of universities in Taiwan
