= List of presidents of the Examination Yuan =

President of the Examination Yuan
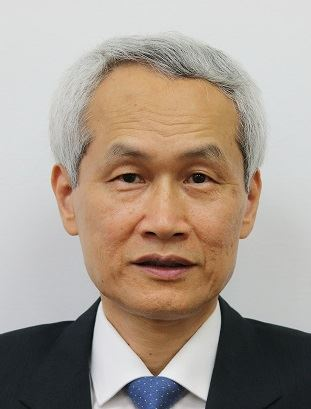
- Incumbent; Chou Hung-hsien since 20 December 2024
- Nominator: President
- Appointer: Legislative Yuan
- Term length: 4 years
- Inaugural holder: Dai Jitao
- Formation: 1948; 78 years ago
- Website: http://intro.exam.gov.tw/enggtm/gtm-index.htm

The president of the Examination Yuan is the head of the Examination Yuan, a constitutional branch of the Republic of China.

== List ==
Non-partisan Kuomintang (Nationalist) Democratic Progressive Party

=== Pre-1947 Constitution ===
Name	Office	Political party
Dai Jitao	25 October 1928 – 1932	Kuomintang
Niou Yung-chien (鈕永建)	1932–1935 as acting	Kuomintang
Dai Jitao	1935 – 10 July 1948	Kuomintang

=== Post-1947 Constitution ===
№	Portrait	Name (Birth–Death)	Took office	Left office	Term	Political party	President
1		Chang Po-ling 張伯苓; Zhāng Bólíng (1876–1951)	10 Jul 1948	25 Nov 1949	1	Kuomintang	Chiang Kai-shek (KMT)
–		Niou Yung-chien 鈕永建; Niǔ Yǒngjiàn (1870–1965)	25 Nov 1949	21 Apr 1952	1	Kuomintang	Chiang Kai-shek (KMT)
2		Chia Ching-teh 賈景德; Jiǎ Jǐngdé (1880–1960)	21 Apr 1952	1 Sep 1954	1	Kuomintang	Chiang Kai-shek (KMT)
3		Mo Teh-hui 莫德惠; Mò Déhuì (1883–1968)	1 Sep 1954	1 Sep 1959	2	Non-partisan	Chiang Kai-shek (KMT)
3		Mo Teh-hui 莫德惠; Mò Déhuì (1883–1968)	1 Sep 1959	1 Sep 1966	3	Non-partisan	Chiang Kai-shek (KMT)
4		Sun Fo 孫科; Sūn Kē (1891–1973)	1 Sep 1966	1 Sep 1972	4	Kuomintang	Chiang Kai-shek (KMT)
4		Sun Fo 孫科; Sūn Kē (1891–1973)	1 Sep 1972	13 Sep 1973	5	Kuomintang	Chiang Kai-shek (KMT)
–		Yang Liang-kung 楊亮功; Yáng Liànggōng (1895–1992)	14 Sep 1973	20 Oct 1973	5	Kuomintang	Chiang Kai-shek (KMT)
5		Yang Liang-kung 楊亮功; Yáng Liànggōng (1895–1992)	20 Oct 1973	1 Sep 1978	5	Kuomintang	Chiang Kai-shek (KMT)
5		Yang Liang-kung 楊亮功; Yáng Liànggōng (1895–1992)	20 Oct 1973	1 Sep 1978	5	Kuomintang	Yen Chia-kan (KMT)
5		Yang Liang-kung 楊亮功; Yáng Liànggōng (1895–1992)	20 Oct 1973	1 Sep 1978	5	Kuomintang	Chiang Ching-kuo (KMT)
6		Liu Chi-hung 劉季洪; Liú Jìhóng (1904–1989)	1 Sep 1978	1 September 1984	6	Kuomintang	Chiang Ching-kuo (KMT)
7		Kung Teh-cheng 孔德成; Kǒng Déchéng (1920–2008)	1 Sep 1984	1 Sep 1990	7	Non-partisan	Chiang Ching-kuo (KMT)
7		Kung Teh-cheng 孔德成; Kǒng Déchéng (1920–2008)	1 Sep 1984	1 Sep 1990	7	Non-partisan	Lee Teng-hui (KMT)
7		Kung Teh-cheng 孔德成; Kǒng Déchéng (1920–2008)	1 Sep 1990	24 Apr 1993	8	Non-partisan	Lee Teng-hui (KMT)
8		Chiu Chuang-huan 邱創煥; Qiū Chuànghuàn (1925–2020)	24 Apr 1993	1 Sep 1996	8	Kuomintang	Lee Teng-hui (KMT)
9		Hsu Shui-teh 許水德; Xǚ Shuǐdé (1931–2021)	1 Sep 1996	1 Sep 2002	9	Kuomintang	Lee Teng-hui (KMT)
9		Hsu Shui-teh 許水德; Xǚ Shuǐdé (1931–2021)	1 Sep 1996	1 Sep 2002	9	Kuomintang	Chen Shui-bian (DPP)
10		Yao Chia-wen 姚嘉文; Yáo Jiāwén (1938- )	1 Sep 2002	1 Sep 2008	10	Democratic Progressive Party	Chen Shui-bian (DPP)
10		Yao Chia-wen 姚嘉文; Yáo Jiāwén (1938- )	1 Sep 2002	1 Sep 2008	10	Democratic Progressive Party	Ma Ying-jeou (KMT)
-		Wu Jin-lin 伍錦霖; Wǔ Jǐnlín (1947- )	1 Sep 2008	1 Dec 2008	11	Kuomintang	Ma Ying-jeou (KMT)
11		John Kuan 關中; Guān Zhōng (1940- )	1 Dec 2008	1 Sep 2014	11	Kuomintang	Ma Ying-jeou (KMT)
12		Wu Jin-lin 伍錦霖; Wǔ Jǐnlín (1947- )	1 Sep 2014	1 Sep 2020	12	Kuomintang	Ma Ying-jeou (KMT)
12		Wu Jin-lin 伍錦霖; Wǔ Jǐnlín (1947- )	1 Sep 2014	1 Sep 2020	12	Kuomintang	Tsai Ing-wen (DPP)
13		Huang Jong-tsun 黃榮村; Huáng Róngcūn (1947- )	1 Sep 2020	1 Sep 2024	13	Non-partisan	Tsai Ing-wen (DPP)
13		Huang Jong-tsun 黃榮村; Huáng Róngcūn (1947- )	1 Sep 2020	1 Sep 2024	13	Non-partisan	Lai Ching-te (DPP)
14		Chou Hung-hsien 周弘憲; Zhōu Hóngxiàn (1953- )	20 Dec 2024	Incumbent	14	Democratic Progressive Party	Lai Ching-te (DPP)

== See also ==
- List of vice presidents of the Examination Yuan
- Constitution of the Republic of China
- List of political office-holders of the Republic of China by age
