= Yang Chao-hsiang =

Taiwanese politician and educator

President of Fo Guang University
- Incumbent
- Assumed office 2 August 2010
- Preceded by: Weng Zhengyi

Minister of Examination
- In office 1 September 2008 – 2 August 2010
- Preceded by: Huang Yabang (acting)
- Succeeded by: Lai Feng-wei

Minister of Education
- In office 16 June 1999 – 20 May 2000
- Preceded by: Lin Ching-chiang
- Succeeded by: Ovid Tzeng

Director of Examination
- In office September 1997 – July 1999
- Preceded by: Huang Ta-chou
- Succeeded by: Wei Qilin

Personal details
- Born: November 5, 1947 (age 78) Xizhi, Taipei County, Taiwan
- Party: Kuomintang
- Education: National Taiwan Normal University (BEd); Minnesota State University (MA); Pennsylvania State University (PhD)

Yang Chao-hsiang (Chinese: 楊朝祥; pinyin: Yáng Cháoxiáng; born 5 November 1947) is a Taiwanese educator who has been the president of Fo Guang University since 2010. He was previously Minister of Examination from 2008 to 2010, Minister of Education from 1999 to 2000, and Director of Examination from 1997 to 1999.

== Early life and education ==
Yang was born on November 5, 1947, in Xizhi Township, Taipei County, Taiwan. He graduated from the Affiliated Senior High School of National Taiwan Normal University.

After high school, Yang earned a B.Ed. from National Taiwan Normal University in 1970. He then completed graduate studies in the United States, earning a master's degree in vocational education from Minnesota State University in 1975 and his Ph.D. in education from Pennsylvania State University in 1978.

== Career ==
After receiving his doctorate, Yang was an assistant professor of vocational education at the University of Arkansas from 1978 to 1980. He then returned to Taiwan and was an associate professor of industrial education from 1980 to 1982 at National Taiwan Normal University, where he later became a full professor and served as the department head of its industrial arts education department from 1982 to 1986.

In 1986, Yang entered politics at the Ministry of Education. In 1997 he was promoted to become Minister of the Research, Development and Evaluation Commission, a position he held until 1999, when he was appointed Minister of Education. After leaving office, he became a member of the Standing Committee of the Kuomintang.

In September 2008 he was appointed Minister of Examination, and served until August 2010.

On August 2, 2010, he was hired by Hsing Yun as President of Fo Guang University.

On January 1, 2010, he was offered a post of President's Council of Advisors.

Government offices
Previous: Huang Ta-chou	Director of Examination; 1997-1999	Next: Wei Qilin
Previous: Lin Ching-chiang	Minister of Education; 1999-2000	Next: Ovid Tzeng
Previous: Huang Yabang (acting)	Minister of Examination; 2008-2010	Next: Lai Fengwei
Educational offices
Previous: Weng Zhengyi	President of Fo Guang University; 2010	Incumbent
