= Chia Ching-teh =

Chinese politician

- 賈景德
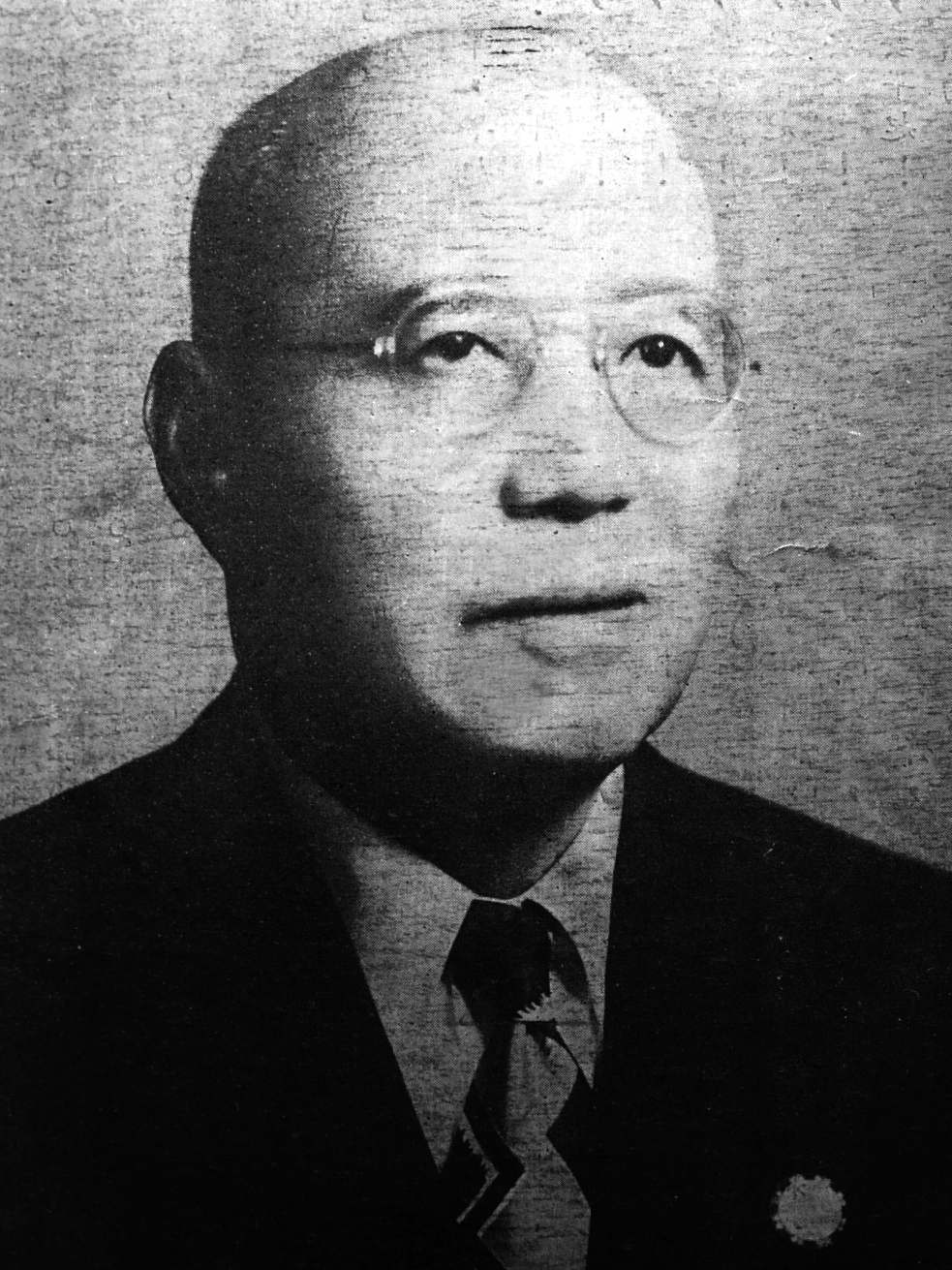

President of the Examination Yuan
- In office 21 April 1952 – 1 September 1954
- Preceded by: Niou Yung-chien
- Succeeded by: Mo Teh-hui

Vice Premier of China
- In office 21 March 1949 – 12 June 1949
- Premier: He Yingqin; Yan Xishan
- Preceded by: Wu Tiecheng
- Succeeded by: Zhu Jiahua

Personal details
- Born: 28 August 1880 Qinshui County, Shanxi, Qing China
- Died: 21 October 1960 (aged 80) Taipei, Taiwan
- Party: Kuomintang
- Education: Hubei Military Academy

Chia Ching-teh (28 August 1880 - 21 October 1960; traditional Chinese: 賈景德; simplified Chinese: 贾景德; pinyin: Jiǎ Jǐngdé) was a politician of the Republic of China. He was the Vice Premier in 1949.

== Background ==
Chia was born in Qinshui County, Shanxi on 28 August 1880. He was educated at Hubei Military Academy. Chinese government records indicated that he was a member of the Examination Yuan, serving as minister at the Ministry of Personnel. On 11 June 1949, he was appointed Secretary General of the Executive Yuan by Yan Xishan.

Diplomatic papers at the U.S. State Department revealed that he was appointed by the acting President Li Zhongren in March 1949 along with a number of new Cabinet personnel. The list was published by Chung Yang Jih Pao.

Chia died in Taipei on 21 October 1960 at the age of 80.
