= List of vice presidents of the Examination Yuan =

Vice President of the Examination Yuan
- Flag of Taiwan

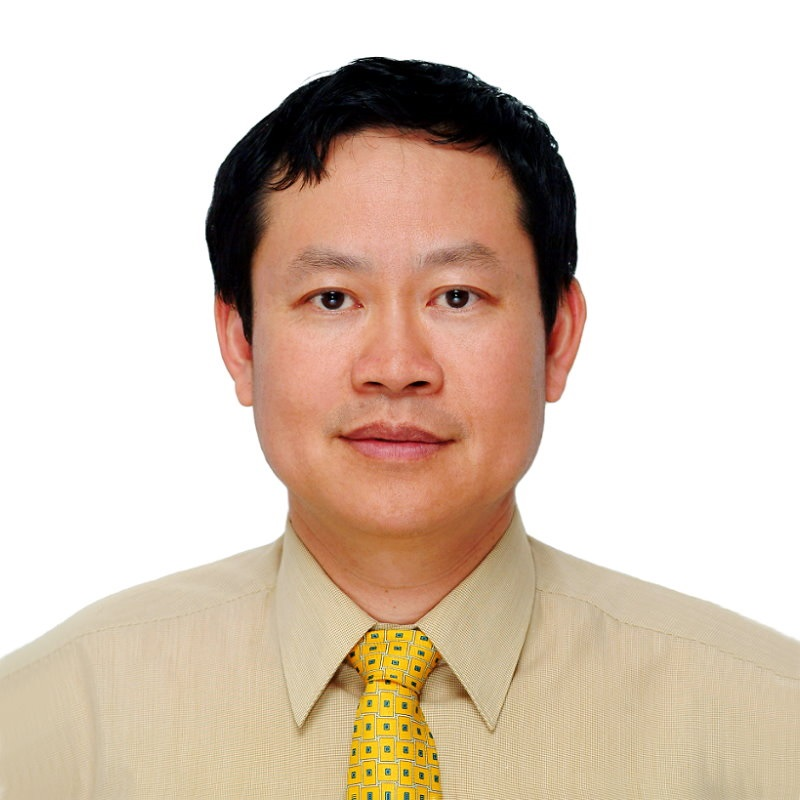
- Incumbent; Hsu Shu-hsiang since 20 December 2024
- Appointer: Presidential nomination with Legislative Yuan confirmation
- Term length: 4 years
- Formation: 1948
- Website: http://intro.exam.gov.tw/enggtm/gtm-index.htm

This is a list of vice presidents of the Examination Yuan, deputy of a constitutional branch in Taiwan:

== List ==
Non-partisan Kuomintang (Nationalist) People First Party Democratic Progressive Party

№	Portrait	Name (Birth–Death)	Took office	Left office	Term	Political party	President
1		Chia Ching-teh 賈景德; Jiǎ Jǐngdé (1880–1960)	24 Jun 1948	21 Mar 1949	1	Kuomintang	Chiang Kai-shek (KMT)
2		Niou Yung-chien 鈕永建; Niǔ Yǒngjiàn (1870–1965)	26 Mar 1949	21 Apr 1952	1	Kuomintang	Chiang Kai-shek (KMT)
3		Luo Jialun 羅家倫; Luó Jiālún (1897–1969)	21 Apr 1952	17 Aug 1954	1	Kuomintang	Chiang Kai-shek (KMT)
4		Wang Yun-wu 王雲五; Wáng Yúnwǔ (1888–1979)	1 Sep 1954	14 Jul 1958	2	Independent	Chiang Kai-shek (KMT)
5		Cheng Tien-fong 程天放; Chéng Tiānfàng (1899–1967)	12 Sep 1958	1 Sep 1959	2	Kuomintang	Chiang Kai-shek (KMT)
5		Cheng Tien-fong 程天放; Chéng Tiānfàng (1899–1967)	1 Sep 1959	1 Sep 1966	3	Kuomintang	Chiang Kai-shek (KMT)
5		Cheng Tien-fong 程天放; Chéng Tiānfàng (1899–1967)	1 Sep 1966	29 Nov 1967	4	Kuomintang	Chiang Kai-shek (KMT)
6		Yang Liang-kung 楊亮功; Yáng Liànggōng (1895–1992)	12 Jan 1968	1 Sep 1972	4	Kuomintang	Chiang Kai-shek (KMT)
6		Yang Liang-kung 楊亮功; Yáng Liànggōng (1895–1992)	1 Sep 1972	11 Oct 1973	5	Kuomintang	Chiang Kai-shek (KMT)
7		Liu Chi-hung 劉季洪; Liú Jìhóng (1904–1989)	20 Oct 1973	1 Sep 1978	5	Kuomintang	Chiang Kai-shek (KMT)
7		Liu Chi-hung 劉季洪; Liú Jìhóng (1904–1989)	20 Oct 1973	1 Sep 1978	5	Kuomintang	Yen Chia-kan (KMT)
7		Liu Chi-hung 劉季洪; Liú Jìhóng (1904–1989)	20 Oct 1973	1 Sep 1978	5	Kuomintang	Chiang Ching-kuo (KMT)
8		Chang Tsung-liang 張宗良; Zhāng Zōngliáng (1905–1986)	1 Sep 1978	1 September 1984	6	Kuomintang	Chiang Ching-kuo (KMT)
9		Lin Chin-sheng 林金生; Lín Jīnshēng (1916–2001)	1 Sep 1984	1 Sep 1990	7	Kuomintang	Chiang Ching-kuo (KMT)
9		Lin Chin-sheng 林金生; Lín Jīnshēng (1916–2001)	1 Sep 1984	1 Sep 1990	7	Kuomintang	Lee Teng-hui (KMT)
9		Lin Chin-sheng 林金生; Lín Jīnshēng (1916–2001)	1 Sep 1990	24 Apr 1993	8	Kuomintang	Lee Teng-hui (KMT)
10		Mao Kao-wen 毛高文; Máo Gāowén (1936-2019)	24 Apr 1993	1 Sep 1996	8	Kuomintang	Lee Teng-hui (KMT)
11		John Kuan 關中; Guān Zhōng (1940- )	1 Sep 1996	20 May 2000	9	Kuomintang	Lee Teng-hui (KMT)
Post vacant							Chen Shui-bian (DPP)
—		Chang Po-ya 張博雅; Zhāng Bóyǎ (1942– )	Confirmation rejected by LY		10	Independent	Chen Shui-bian (DPP)
Post vacant							Chen Shui-bian (DPP)
12		Wu Rong-ming 吳容明; Wú Róngmíng (1943- )	8 Jun 2004	1 Sep 2008	10	People First Party	Chen Shui-bian (DPP)
12		Wu Rong-ming 吳容明; Wú Róngmíng (1943- )	8 Jun 2004	1 Sep 2008	10	People First Party	Ma Ying-jeou (KMT)
13		Wu Jin-lin 伍錦霖; Wǔ Jǐnlín (1947- )	1 Sep 2008	30 Jan 2011	11	Kuomintang	Ma Ying-jeou (KMT)
Post vacant							Ma Ying-jeou (KMT)
13		Wu Jin-lin 伍錦霖; Wǔ Jǐnlín (1947- )	13 Apr 2012	1 Sep 2014	11	Kuomintang	Ma Ying-jeou (KMT)
14		Kao Yaung-kuang 高永光; Gāo Yǒngguāng (1954- )	1 Sep 2014	31 Dec 2016	12	Kuomintang	Ma Ying-jeou (KMT)
14		Kao Yaung-kuang 高永光; Gāo Yǒngguāng (1954- )	1 Sep 2014	31 Dec 2016	12	Kuomintang	Tsai Ing-wen (DPP)
15		Lee I-yang 李逸洋; Lǐ Yìyáng (1955- )	1 Mar 2017	1 Sep 2020	12	Democratic Progressive Party	Tsai Ing-wen (DPP)
16		Chou Hung-hsien 周弘憲; Zhōu Hóngxiàn (1953- )	1 Sep 2020	1 Sep 2024	13	Democratic Progressive Party	Tsai Ing-wen (DPP)
16		Chou Hung-hsien 周弘憲; Zhōu Hóngxiàn (1953- )	1 Sep 2020	1 Sep 2024	13	Democratic Progressive Party	Lai Ching-te (DPP)
17		Hsu Shu-hsiang 許舒翔; Xǔ Shūxiáng (1961- )	20 Dec 2024	Incumbent	14	Independent	Lai Ching-te (DPP)

== See also ==
- Constitution of the Republic of China
- List of presidents of the Examination Yuan
