= Huang Jong-tsun =

Taiwanese psychologist and politician

- 黃榮村
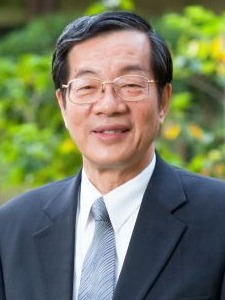
- Official portrait, 2010

13th President of the Examination Yuan
- In office 1 September 2020 – 1 September 2024
- Appointed by: Tsai Ing-wen
- Vice President: Chou Hung-hsien
- Preceded by: Wu Jin-lin
- Succeeded by: Liu Chien-sin (acting); Chou Hung-hsien

16th President of the China Medical University
- In office 1 August 2005 – 12 February 2014
- Preceded by: Ye Chun-fu
- Succeeded by: Wen-Hwa Lee

21st Minister of Education
- In office 1 February 2002 – 20 May 2004
- Prime Minister: Yu Shyi-kun
- Preceded by: Ovid Tzeng
- Succeeded by: Tu Cheng-sheng

Personal details
- Born: March 30, 1947 (age 79) Tienchung, Changhua County, Taiwan Province, China
- Party: Independent
- Education: National Taiwan University (BA, MA, PhD)

Chinese name
- Traditional Chinese: 黃榮村
- Simplified Chinese: 黄荣村
Transcriptions
Standard Mandarin
- Hanyu Pinyin: Huáng Róngcūn

Huang Jong-tsun (Chinese: 黃榮村; pinyin: Huáng Róngcūn; born 30 March 1947) is a Taiwanese psychologist and politician who serves as the current President of the Examination Yuan. Prior to assuming his current role, Huang had served as President of China Medical University from 2005 to 2014 and Minister of Education from 2002 and 2004. He is the first President of the Examination Yuan not affiliated with any political party.

== Early life and education ==
Huang was born in Tianzhong, Changhua County, on 30 March 1947. He attended Jingxiu National School and graduated from Yuanlin High School in 1965. Afterwards, he studied history at National Taiwan University, but later switched to psychology and graduated with a B.A. in psychology in 1969. He earned an M.A. in psychology in 1972 and his Ph.D. in psychology from the university in 1976.

== Career ==
After receiving his doctorate, Huang became a professor.

Huang entered politics in 1996, the year when he was appointed director for the Ministry of Science and Technology. He was then promoted in February 2002 to Minister of Education, a position he held until 20 May 2004.

Huang was appointed president of China Medical University in August 2005, having served until 12 February 2014. He resigned following a row during a Legislative Yuan session with Chen Ting-fei, a Democratic Progressive Party lawmaker representing Tainan, over his alleged conflict of interest for assuming chancellorship of the China Medical University months after resigning as Minister of Education. About 500 academics and students from the China Medical University signed a petition pleading Huang to reconsider his decision after he tendered resignation, which the board of directors of the university initially rejected.

Huang was invited and nominated by President Tsai Ing-wen to serve as President of the Examination Yuan on 29 May 2020. His nomination was confirmed by the Legislative Yuan on 10 July 2020 in a 65-3 vote. Legislators from both the Kuomintang and the Taiwan People's Party boycotted the vote, whereas the New Power Party caucus voted against the nominations. Huang was sworn into office on 1 September 2020.

Government offices
Preceded by Ovid Tzeng	Minister of Education; 2002-2004	Succeeded by Tu Cheng-sheng
Preceded by Wu Jin-lin	President of the Examination Yuan; 2020–present	Incumbent
Educational offices
Preceded by Ye Chun-fu	President of China Medical University; 2005-2014	Succeeded by Li Wen-hua
