= Examination Yuan =

Government branch of the Republic of China

- 考試院; Kǎoshì Yuàn (Mandarin); Khó-chhì Īⁿ (Taiwanese); Kháu-sṳ Yen (Hakka)

Agency overview
- Formed: January 1930
- Jurisdiction: Republic of China (Taiwan)
- Headquarters: Wenshan, Taipei
- Agency executives: Chou Hung-hsien, President; Hsu Shu-hsiang, Vice President; Liu Chien-sin, Secretary-General; Yuan Tze-yu, Deputy Secretary-General
- Website: www.exam.gov.tw

Examination Yuan
- Chinese: 考試院
- Literal meaning: Court of Examinations
Transcriptions
Standard Mandarin
- Hanyu Pinyin: Kǎoshì Yuàn
- Bopomofo: ㄎㄠˇ ㄕˋ ㄩㄢˋ
- Gwoyeu Romatzyh: Kaoshyh Yuann
- Wade–Giles: K'ao^{3}-shih^{4} Yüan^{4}
- Tongyong Pinyin: Kǎoshìh Yuàn
- MPS2: Kǎushr̀ Yuàn
Hakka
- Romanization: Kháu-sṳ Yen
Southern Min
- Hokkien POJ: Khó-chhì Īⁿ
- Tâi-lô: Khó-tshì Īnn

The Examination Yuan is the civil service commission branch in charge of validating the qualification of civil servants of the government of the Republic of China (Taiwan). It has a president, a vice president, and seven to nine members, all of whom are nominated by the president of the republic and confirmed by the Legislative Yuan for four-year terms according to Republic of China laws.

== Organizational structure ==
=== Members composition ===
The Examination Yuan consists of a council with a president, a vice president, and seven to nine members. The leaders and members are nominated by the president of the republic and approved by Legislative Yuan for four-year terms. The most recent 14th Examination Yuan was nominated by President Lai Ching-te on May 31, 2024, and all nominations except one were later confirmed by Legislative Yuan on December 17, 2024. Members of the 14th Yuan were inaugurated on December 20, 2024, and their terms will expire on August 31, 2028.

President	Vice President
Chou Hung-hsien	Hsu Shu-hsiang
Members
Six members (seven member were nominated but one member was rejected by the Legislative Yuan)

=== Agencies ===
The Examination Yuan has four main agencies:

- The Ministry of Examination (考選部), which administers examinations for civil servants and contract personnel.
- Ministry of Civil Service (銓敘部), which oversees the pay, promotion, and retirement of civil servants.
- Civil Service Protection and Training Commission (公務人員保障暨培訓委員會), which is responsible for training and protecting the rights of civil servants.
- Public Service Pension Fund Supervisory Board (公務人員退休撫卹基金監理委員會)

=== Offices and committees ===
The Examination Yuan also includes twelve offices and three committees:

- Counselors
- Secretariat
- First Division
- Second Division
- Third Division
- Editing and Compilation Office
- Information Management Office
- Secretary Office
- Personnel Office
- Accounting Office
- Statistics Office
- Civil Service Ethics Office
- Petition and Appeals Committee
- Legal Affairs Committee
- Research and Development Committee

== History ==
=== Constitutional theory ===
The concept of Examination Yuan is a part of the Three Principles of the People formulated by Sun Yat-sen, which was enlightened by the old Imperial examination system used in Imperial China. It is one of the five government branches ("yuans") of the Government of the Republic of China. Practically, it operates like a ministry of the Executive Yuan, though its members may not be removed by the president or premier.

=== Establishment and relocation to Taiwan ===
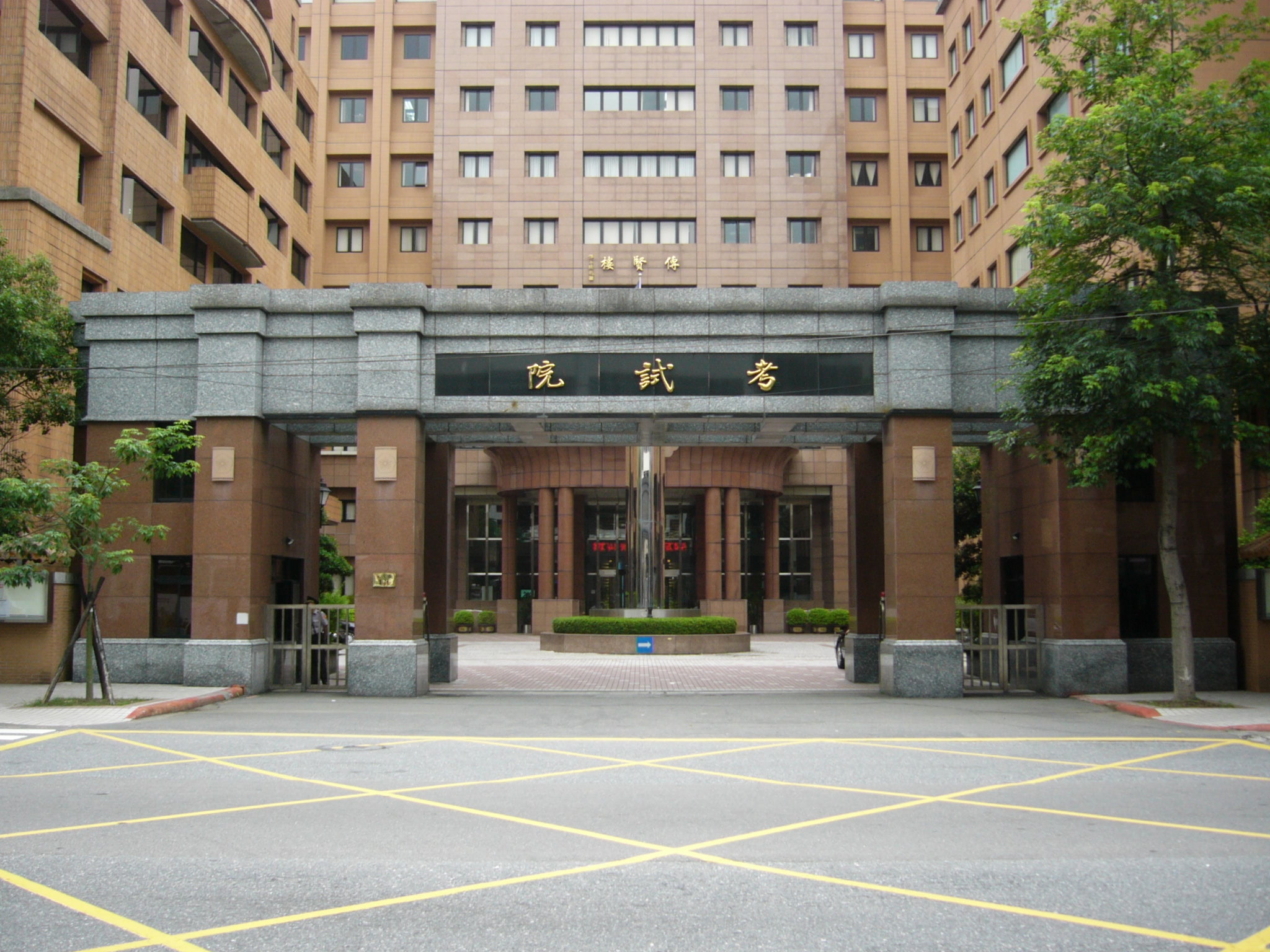
Examination Yuan building in Wenshan, Taipei.

After the end of Northern Expedition in 1928, the Nationalist government set up the preparatory office of the Examination Yuan in October 1928 in which the organic law was promulgated. In May 1929, the headquarters of the Examination Yuan was inaugurated at Guan Gong and Yue Fei Temple in Nanjing. In January 1930, the Examination Yuan and its subordinates Examination Committee and Ministry of Civil Service were formally established. In December 1937, the headquarters was temporarily relocated to Chongqing during the Second Sino-Japanese War. After the end of World War II in 1945, the headquarters was moved back to Nanjing.

In January 1950, as a result of the Kuomintang's defeat in the Chinese Civil War, the headquarters were relocated temporarily to Taipei Confucius Temple in Taiwan, which was retroceded by the ROC from Japan after its half-century colonial rule following the end of World War II in 1945. In December 1951, the headquarters were moved to Muzha District, Taipei. In March 1990, the Yuheng Building of the Yuan was inaugurated.

=== Democratization ===
During the second revision of the Additional Articles of the Constitution in 1992, confirmation powers of its members were transferred from the Control Yuan to the Legislative Yuan, and articles related to its role as a governing body of mainland China were abolished. In 2019, the Examination Yuan was reduced from 19 members to between 7 and 9, and terms were reduced from 6 years to 4 to coincide with presidential and legislative elections.

There have been calls to abolish the Examination Yuan (and the Control Yuan) by the Democratic Progressive Party (DPP), the Taiwan People's Party (TPP) and New Power Party (NPP). TPP caucus whip Lai Hsiang-ling stated that members of the Examination Yuan hold "fat-cat patronage appointments", whereby they earn outside income on top of their usual salary, including by teaching at universities in mainland China. Additionally, the functions of the Examination Yuan are seen as overlapping with those of the Executive Yuan, and an online poll showed about half of respondents supported its abolishment. President Tsai Ing-wen called for the two Yuans to be abolished at the DPP national congress in 2020; the Kuomintang responded by saying that it was an effort to distract from the DPP's poor leadership, but did not provide their stance on the matter. A constitutional amendment committee was formed in September of 2020 to draft proposals for the abolition of the Examination Yuan.

== Terms ==
Appointments of the leaders and members of the Examination Yuan were carried out with presidential nomination and parliamentary confirmation. The first through eighth Examination Yuans were all confirmed by the first Control Yuan, whose members first convened in 1948 and had their terms extended indefinitely. During the democratization of Taiwan in the 1990s, a series of constitutional amendments known as the Additional Articles of the Constitution were promulgated to reorganize the government. These amendments changed the Control Yuan from a parliament chamber to a commission-type agency. Confirmation of the Examination Yuan officials was then moved to other parliament chambers to maintain the separation of powers.

Term	Length	Actual length	Appointment	Seats
1st	6 years	Sep 8, 1948—Aug 31, 1954	Presidential nomination with Control Yuan confirmation	19
2nd	6 years	Sep 1, 1954—Aug 31, 1960	Presidential nomination with Control Yuan confirmation	19
3rd	6 years	Sep 1, 1960—Aug 31, 1966	Presidential nomination with Control Yuan confirmation	19
4th	6 years	Sep 1, 1966—Aug 31, 1972	Presidential nomination with Control Yuan confirmation	19
5th	6 years	Sep 1, 1972—Aug 31, 1978	Presidential nomination with Control Yuan confirmation	19
6th	6 years	Sep 1, 1978—Aug 31, 1984	Presidential nomination with Control Yuan confirmation	19
7th	6 years	Sep 1, 1984—Aug 31, 1990	Presidential nomination with Control Yuan confirmation	19
8th	6 years	Sep 1, 1990—Aug 31, 1996	Presidential nomination with Control Yuan confirmation	19
9th	6 years	Sep 1, 1996—Aug 31, 2002	Presidential nomination with National Assembly confirmation	19
10th	6 years	Sep 1, 2002—Aug 31, 2008	Presidential nomination with Legislative Yuan confirmation	19
11th	6 years	Sep 1, 2008—Aug 31, 2014	Presidential nomination with Legislative Yuan confirmation	19
12th	6 years	Sep 1, 2014—Aug 31, 2020	Presidential nomination with Legislative Yuan confirmation	19
13th	4 years	Sep 1, 2020—Aug 31, 2024	Presidential nomination with Legislative Yuan confirmation	9
14th	4 years	Dec 20, 2024—present	Presidential nomination with Legislative Yuan confirmation	7

Currently, according to the Additional Articles of the Constitution, the Examination Yuan is confirmed by the now-unicameral parliament — the Legislative Yuan.

== Notable members ==
- Zhang Mojun: 1st Examination Yuan
- Gao Yihan: 1st Examination Yuan
- Shui Zi: 1st Examination Yuan
- Chang Ch'i-yun: 1st Examination Yuan
- Liu Yizheng: 1st Examination Yuan
- Cha Liang-chao: 2nd, 3rd and 4th Examination Yuan
- Zhang Mojun: 2nd and 3rd Examination Yuan
- Robert C. T. Lee: 7th Examination Yuan
- Wang Tso-jung: 7th Examination Yuan
- Lee Ching-hsiung: 10th Examination Yuan
- Hsu Cheng-kuang: 10th Examination Yuan
- Tsai Bih-hwang: 10th and 11th Examination Yuan
- Huang Jun-ying: 11th Examination Yuan
- Chester Chou: 12th Examination Yuan
- Yao Leeh-ter: 13th Examination Yuan
- Iwan Nawi: 13th and 14th Examination Yuan
- Chiau Wen-yan: 14th Examination Yuan
- Teng Chia-chi: 14th Examination Yuan

== See also ==
- Government of the Republic of China
  - Executive Yuan
    - Directorate-General of Personnel Administration
      - Civil Service Development Institute
      - Regional Civil Service Development Institute
- Politics of the Republic of China
- Civil service commission
