= Chiu Chuang-huan =

Taiwanese politician (1925–2020)

- 邱創煥
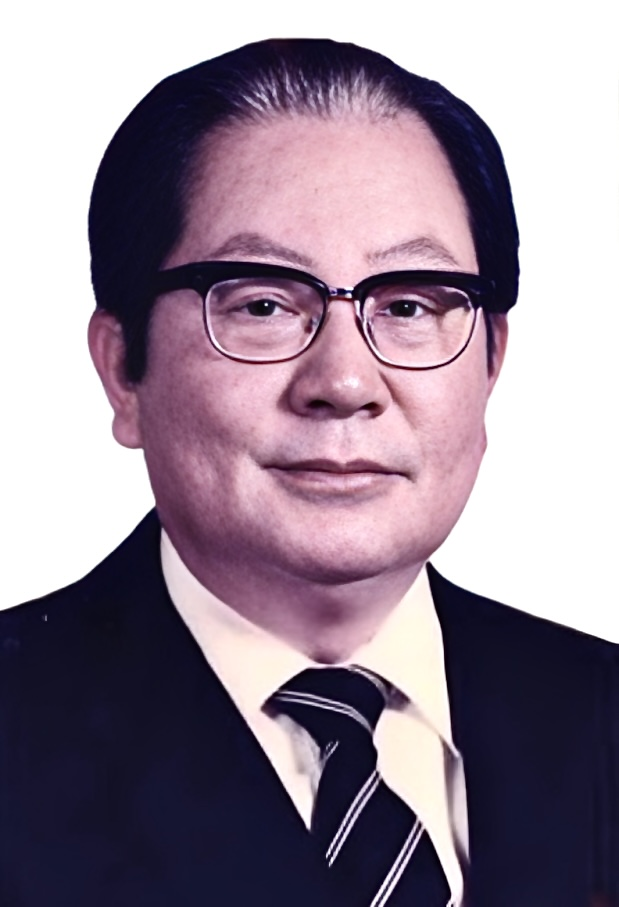
- Official portrait, 1978

8th President of the Examination Yuan
- In office 24 April 1993 – 1 September 1996
- Appointed by: Lee Teng-hui
- Vice President: Mao Kao-wen
- Preceded by: Kung Teh-cheng
- Succeeded by: Hsu Shui-teh

Acting Premier of the Republic of China
- In office 24 February 1984 – 1 June 1984
- President: Chiang Ching-kuo
- Preceded by: Sun Yun-suan
- Succeeded by: Yu Kuo-hwa

13th Vice Premier of the Republic of China
- In office 1 December 1981 – 1 June 1984
- Prime Minister: Sun Yun-suan; Himself (acting); Yu Kuo-hwa
- Preceded by: Hsu Ching-chung
- Succeeded by: Lin Yang-kang

12th Chairman of the Taiwan Provincial Government
- In office 9 June 1984 – 16 June 1990
- Prime Minister: Yu Kuo-hwa; Lee Huan
- Preceded by: Lee Teng-hui; Liu Chao-tien (acting)
- Succeeded by: Lien Chan

14th Minister of the Interior
- In office 29 May 1978 – 25 November 1981
- Prime Minister: Sun Yun-suan
- Preceded by: Chang Feng-hsu
- Succeeded by: Lin Yang-kang

Personal details
- Born: 25 July 1925 Tianwei, Taichū, Taiwan, Empire of Japan
- Died: 2 July 2020 (aged 94) Taipei, Taiwan
- Party: Kuomintang
- Education: National Taichung University of Education (BA); National Chengchi University (MA)

Chiu Chuang-huan (Chinese: 邱創煥; pinyin: Qiū Chuànghuàn; 25 July 1925 – 2 July 2020) was a Taiwanese politician. He was the Vice Premier from 1981 to 1984.

Born in Changhua, Chiu was of Hakka ancestry from Raoping, Chaozhou, Guangdong, China.

Chiu died on 2 July 2020, aged 94.

== See also ==
- List of vice premiers of the Republic of China
