= Yao Chia-wen =

Taiwanese politician and lawyer

- 姚嘉文
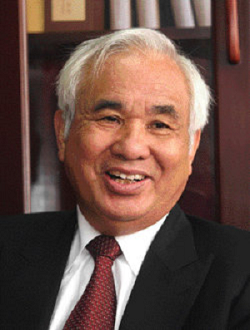
- Official portrait, 2016

Senior Advisor to the President
- Incumbent
- Assumed office 9 November 2016
- President: Tsai Ing-wen
- In office 20 May 2000 – 31 August 2002
- President: Chen Shui-bian

14th President of the Examination Yuan
- In office 21 June 2002 – 1 September 2008
- Appointed by: Chen Shui-bian
- Vice President: Wu Rong-ming
- Preceded by: Hsu Shui-teh
- Succeeded by: Wu Jin-lin (acting)

Member of the Legislative Yuan
- In office February 1, 1993 – January 31, 1996
- Constituency: Changhua County

2nd Chairman of the Democratic Progressive Party
- In office 20 December 1987 – 30 October 1988
- Secretary General: Huang Erh-hsuan
- Preceded by: Chiang Peng-chien
- Succeeded by: Huang Hsin-chieh

Personal details
- Born: June 15, 1938 (age 88) Wabi Town, Shōka District, Taichū Prefecture, Japanese Taiwan (modern-day Hemei, Changhua, Taiwan)
- Party: Democratic Progressive Party
- Spouse: Chou Ching-yu
- Education: National Taiwan University (LLB, LLM); University of California, Berkeley (MSL)
- Profession: Lawyer

Yao Chia-wen (Chinese: 姚嘉文; pinyin: Yáo Jiāwén; Pe̍h-ōe-jī: Iâu Ka-bûn; born 15 June 1938) is a Taiwanese politician and lawyer who is an important figure in Taiwan's democratization movement. He was the second chairperson of the Democratic Progressive Party (DPP), serving from 1987 to 1988. He was a member of the Legislative Yuan from 1993 to 1996, and president of the Examination Yuan between 2002 and 2008.

Yao was also a practicing lawyer. In 1979, he was imprisoned due to his involvement in the Formosa Incident and authored his representative work Taiwan Story of Seven Colors (臺灣七色記) while incarcerated. After his release, Yao held various positions, including chairman of the Democratic Progressive Party (DPP), DPP Central Committee member, publisher of the Formosa Magazine (美麗島), and legislator.

== Early life and education ==
Born in Wabi Town, Shōka District, Taichū Prefecture, Japanese Taiwan (modern-day Hemei, Changhua, Taiwan), Yao has eleven younger siblings. In 1957, he started working as a clerk in the Bureau of Telecommunications, which is now the Chunghwa Telecom.

Yao studied law at the National Taiwan University in Taipei and graduated with his Bachelor of Laws (LL.B.) in 1966. He passed the bar exam after graduating and earned his Master of Laws (LL.M.) from the university in 1968. He then went to the United States to pursue further graduate studies at the University of California, Berkeley, as a student at Boalt Hall in 1972. He co-founded the "Legal Advice Center for Citizens" (平民法律服務中心) in 1972 after attending UC Berkeley. In 1975, he and Lin Yi-hsiung served as defense lawyers for Kuo Yu-hsin. Four years later, Yao represented Yu Teng-fa.

Yao is married to Chou Ching-yu, who is a former magistrate of Changhua County. Yao later received an honorary doctorate in law from Hankyong National University in South Korea

== Political career ==
Yau Jia-wen's main area of research is "legal aid." He founded the "Legal Advice Center for Citizens" and served as the general secretary of the "Association of Comparative Law", contributing to judicial reforms and advocating for the rule of law. In 1975, together with Lin Yi-hsiung (林義雄), he defended Kuo Yu-hsin (郭雨新) in a lawsuit, earning the title "Guardian of Justice Outside the Party". In 1978, he published Maintaining and Amending the Law (護法與變法), advocating for a comprehensive election of the parliament. He also participated in the National Assembly election, which was suspended due to the termination of diplomatic relations between Taiwan and the United States. During his tenure as the chairman of the DPP in the second term, Yau passed the "Taiwan Sovereignty Independence Case" and proposed the framework for a new constitution for Taiwan in 1989.

Yao called for the abolition of the National Assembly in his book Maintaining and Amending the Law (護法與變法) published in 1978. In 1979, Yao was arrested and sentenced to 12 years in prison for his involvement in the Kaohsiung Incident. He remained in prison for seven years and became the chairperson of the Democratic Progressive Party after he was released. Under his chairmanship, the party adopted the "Program for the Sovereign Independence of Taiwan" (臺灣主權獨立案). In 1992, Yao joined the Welfare State Alliance (福利國連線) faction of the DPP founded by Frank Hsieh. He was elected a member of the Legislative Yuan the same year, but was not re-elected in 1995.

In 1997, Yao started teaching at National Tsing Hua University as an associate professor. He worked as a lawyer again in 1999, as he ran unsuccessfully for legislator again in 1998. President Chen Shui-bian appointed Yao as one of his Senior Advisors in 2000. Two years later, he was appointed as the President of the Examination Yuan. After a contentious but successful confirmation, media coverage focused heavily on alleged extramarital affairs.

Yao was replaced by the Ma Ying-jeou government in 2008 after Chen Shui-bian's administration left office. Yao was named a senior adviser to Tsai Ing-wen in October 2016.

== Literature activities ==
Yau Jia-wen's literary works primarily consist of novels, with his magnum opus Taiwan Story of Seven Colors (臺灣七色記) of three million characters being an extensive historical novel spanning seven books and fourteen volumes, along with an additional volume titled Prequel (前記). The narrative covers the years 383 AD to 1984, using the migration of Taiwanese people across the Taiwan Strait as a backdrop, telling the story of resistance against oppression and the pursuit of democracy and independence.

He has also authored more than twenty works in the fields of law, politics, history, and literature, including historical novels such as Jenchihkuan of Wushe (霧社人止關) and Mission No. 9: A Female Agent of the Formosa Era (九號任務：美麗島時代女特務), as well as works like Spring and Autumn of the Ten Nations of the South China Sea (南海十國春秋) presenting concrete views on the South China Sea and Taiwan Strait situations.

== Political ideology ==
Yao supports the Taiwan independence movement. He was an editor of the Formosa Magazine, which is associated with the Tangwai movement. In 2006, he wrote a book that examines treaties that have strongly influenced the Taiwanese history with a goal to "set the facts straight" as the history of Taiwan is controversial.
