= John Kuan =

Taiwanese politician

Kuan Chung
- 關中
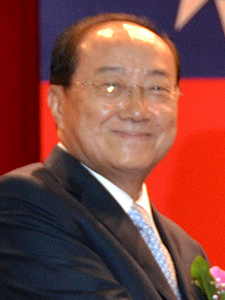

11th President of the Examination Yuan
- In office 1 December 2008 – 31 August 2014
- Vice: Wu Jin-lin
- Preceded by: Yao Chia-wen; Wu Jin-lin (acting)
- Succeeded by: Wu Jin-lin

11th Vice President of the Examination Yuan
- In office 1 September 1996 – 30 May 2000
- President: Hsu Shui-teh
- Preceded by: Mao Gao-wen
- Succeeded by: Wu Rong-ming

Minister of the Civil Service
- In office 1 September 1994 – 31 August 1996
- Preceded by: Chen Kuei-hua
- Succeeded by: Chiu Chin-yi

Member of the Legislative Yuan
- In office 1 February 1993 – 1 September 1994
- Constituency: Taipei 1

Personal details
- Born: 9 June 1940 (age 86) Tientsin, China
- Party: Kuomintang
- Spouse: Chang Hui-chun
- Children: Wendy Kuan
- Education: National Chengchi University (BA); Tufts University (MA, MA, PhD)

Kuan Chung (Chinese: 關中; pinyin: Guān Zhōng; born 9 June 1940), also known by his English name John Kuan, is a Taiwanese diplomat and politician who was president of the Examination Yuan of the Republic of China from 2008 to 2014.

== Early life and education ==
Kuan was born in Tianjin, China, in 1940. He is of Manchu descent, belonging to the Plain White Banner. His father, Kuan Da-chung, was a KMT politician.

After high school, Kuan graduated from National Chengchi University with a bachelor's degree in diplomacy in 1967 and briefly enrolled in National Taiwan University to study political science before withdrawing. He completed graduate studies in the United States at Tufts University, where he earned a Master of Arts (M.A.) in diplomacy, a second master's degree, and his Ph.D. in international relations from the Fletcher School of Law and Diplomacy in 1969 and 1973, respectively.

Kuan's doctoral dissertation was titled, "The Kuomintang-Communist Party Negotiations, 1944–1946: The Failure of Efforts to Avoid Civil War". He later was awarded an honorary Doctor of Laws by the University of Indianapolis.

== Personal life ==
Kuan's surname Kuan is the sinicized form of his clan (hala) name Gūwalgiya (Manchu: ᡤᡡᠸᠠᠯᡤᡳᠶᠠ Chinese: 瓜爾佳氏).

Kuan's daughter, Wendy Kuan (關雲娣), died in May 2011 after she fell from the kitchen window of her 27th floor apartment in Shanghai. It was rumored that she committed suicide because her husband, Zero Lin (林哲樂), was having an affair. Kuan has avoided meeting Lin ever since his daughter's death, refusing to attend any family events where his son-in-law would be present.

== See also ==
- Manchu people in Taiwan
