= Chang Si-liang =

Taiwanese police officer (1941–2024)

- 張四良
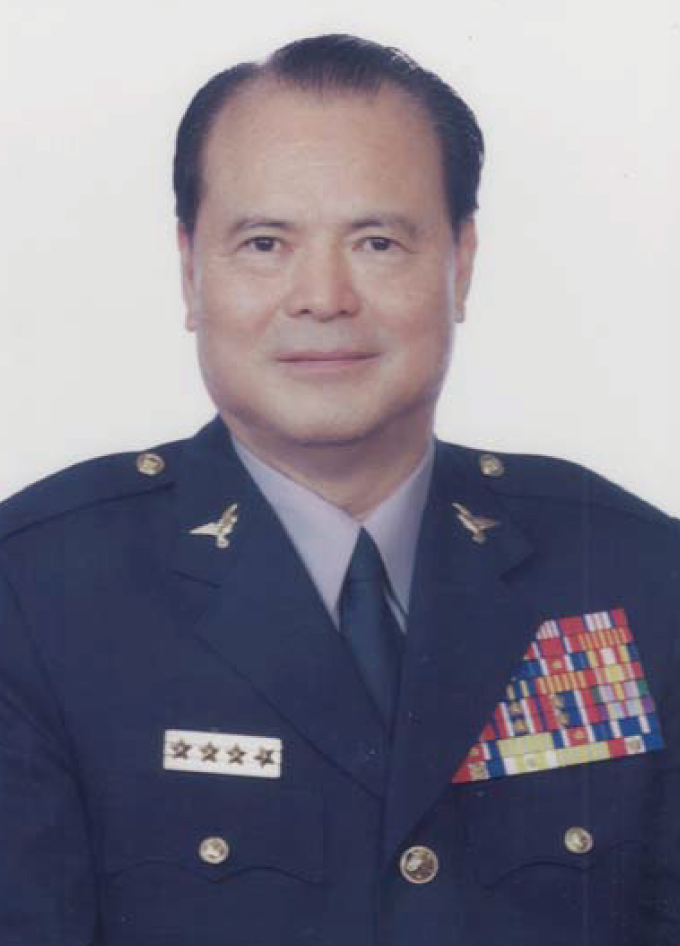

Director-General of the National Police Agency of the Republic of China
- In office 1 July 2003 – April 2004
- Preceded by: Wang Ginn-wang
- Succeeded by: Hsieh Ing-dan

Personal details
- Born: 1941 Hsinchu, Taiwan, Japan
- Died: 19 November 2024 (aged 83)
- Education: Central Police University (BA)

Chang Si-liang (Chinese: 張四良; pinyin: Zhāng Sìliáng; 1941 – 19 November 2024) was a Taiwanese police officer.

== Early life and law enforcement career ==
Chang was born in Hsinchu and raised in Taipei. He specialized in criminal investigation while attending Central Police University, from which he graduated in 1965. Chang began his law enforcement career as a detective within the National Police Agency's Criminal Investigation Bureau. He subsequently led precincts within Taipei City Police Department, served as TCPD's deputy commissioner, led Hualien Police Department, and served as Third Peace Preservation Police chief. In 1999, Chang became head of the Aviation Police Bureau, which he had served previously as second-in-command. As police bureau chief at Chiang Kai-shek International Airport, Chang worked to stop drug smuggling and took part in the care of political asylum seekers. In October 2002, Chang and the National Immigration Agency's Tseng Wen-chang were questioned by Control Yuan members Lee Shen-yi and Lin Shih-chi regarding the defection of Republic of China Army Lieutenant Wang Yi-hung.

== National Police Agency ==
On 1 July 2003, Chang succeeded Wang Ginn-wang as director-general of the National Police Agency. That same month, Chang participated in a drug raid of the largest nightclub in Taiwan, alongside interior minister Yu Cheng-hsien and Criminal Investigation Bureau commissioner Hou You-yi. A few days after the raid, Chang and over 400 police officers were transferred to Hualien County to form an investigative force targeting electoral fraud during a by-election for county magistrate. Less than a week after the investigations began, Chang stated that 119 cases of possible vote buying had been reported. As head of the National Police Agency, Chang commented on police efforts to track Chu An-hsiung, a member of the Kaohsiung City Council who stood accused of vote buying dating to December 2002. In December 2003, Chang was invited to serve on a task force focusing on electoral fraud.

Days before the Police Duties Enforcement Act came into effect on 1 December 2003, Chang spoke highly of the bill, stating, "This new law will protect both human rights and the police themselves." That month, Chang announced that the National Police Agency would house Chinese illegal immigrants in detention centers on Kinmen and Matsu as part of the government's Hunting Snake task force against illegal immigration.

The 2004 Taiwanese referendum and presidential election were beset by several issues, including misplaced ballots. On 19 March 2004, Chang convened a meeting to discuss law enforcement during the 2004 presidential election, to be held the next day. On the day of the meeting, Chen Shui-bian and Annette Lu of the Democratic Progressive Party ticket were shot in Tainan. Following a Pan-Blue Coalition challenge of the electoral results, Chang stated that the National Police Agency would be available to provide security. Mayor of Taipei Ma Ying-jeou criticized the interference of Chang and the National Police Agency, stating "I think it was illegal, unfeasible and unnecessary for the NPA to intervene in the dispersion" of demonstrators protesting the presidential election results along Ketagalan Boulevard. Chang resigned as director-general of the National Police Agency on 5 April 2004, to take responsibility for the attack on Chen and Lu. The resignation of interior minister Yu Cheng-hsien for the same reason was approved prior to Chang's, leaving Yu's successor Su Jia-chyuan to decide Chang's status. Upon leaving his position in April 2004, Chang became the NPA head with the shortest tenure.

== Death and legacy ==
Chang died on 19 November 2024, at the age of 83. His funeral was held on 7 December 2024, in Taipei. The Lai Ching-te presidential administration issued a commendation of Chang's life and career.
