= Tsai Chia-fu =

Taiwanese politician (born 1956)

- 蔡家福
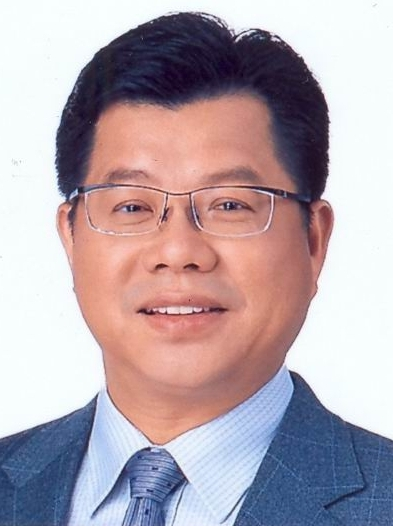

President of the Chinese Taipei Olympic Committee
- Incumbent
- Assumed office 1 January 2026
- Preceded by: Lin Hung-dow

Deputy Magistrate of Taipei County
- In office 24 August 2009 – 25 December 2010 Serving with Lee Hong-yuan and Lee Shu-chuan
- Magistrate: Chou Hsi-wei

Member of the Legislative Yuan
- In office 1 February 1999 – 31 January 2008
- Preceded by: Multi-member district
- Succeeded by: Lin Shu-fen
- Constituency: Taipei County 2

Mayor of Xinzhuang
- In office 1 March 1990 – 1 March 1998
- Preceded by: Hsu Liu-lang
- Succeeded by: Huang Lin Ling-ling

Member of the Xinzhuang Township Council
- In office 1 August 1982 – 1 March 1990

Personal details
- Born: 4 May 1956 (age 69) Xinzhuang, Taipei County, Taiwan
- Party: Kuomintang

Tsai Chia-fu (Chinese: 蔡家福; born 4 May 1956) is a Taiwanese politician. He served two terms each on the local council of and as mayor of Xinzhuang. From 1999 to 2008, Tsai was a member of the Legislative Yuan. In 2025, he was elected president of the Chinese Taipei Olympic Committee.

== Early life ==
Tsai Chia-fu's mother Lee Tsui-yun raised him and four siblings as a single parent in Xinzhuang, then in Taipei County. As a child, Tsai sold savory rice pudding and youtiao to help his family earn income. After graduating from a commerce-track high school, Tsai began working as a custodian for the Xinzhuang Township Office. After completing his compulsory military service, Tsai married Tai Pi-yun, whom he had first met while working at the township office. Building from his work experience as a small business owner, bookkeeper, and land registration agent, Tsai pursued coursework in land administration and business management at Chinese Culture University and the University of Hawaiʻi.

== Political career ==
Prior to Tsai's election to the Legislative Yuan, he served in local government, first as spokesperson of Xinzhuang. He was then elected to Xinzhuang's local council as its youngest member in 1982 and served two terms, followed by eight years as mayor. He held Taipei County's second district from 1999 to 2008. Tsai led the Taipei County Sports Association for eight years, and, in 1998, chaired the national-level federation of local sporting associations. In 2001, Tsai entered the Kuomintang party primary for Taipei County Magistrate. The Pan-Blue Coalition chose a unified ticket represented by New Party member Wang Chien-shien, who lost to incumbent Su Tseng-chang.

During his legislative tenure, Tsai commented on the May 2001 fire that damaged the Eastern Science Park in his district. In 2002, he led a protest advocating for increased resource allocation to local governments, and was named the deputy chair of the newly established Taiwan-Britain Inter-Parliamentary Amity Association. The following year, Tsai took part in a ceremony marking the first time Taiwan's partially state-owned flag carrier, China Airlines, had operated a direct flight to mainland China. Tsai supported the Taipei Metro's plans to construct a depot at the site of the Losheng Sanatorium, a topic of debate throughout 2007. That year, Tsai also expressed support for Taipei County Magistrate Chou Hsi-wei's decision to promote 140 police officers. After leaving the legislature, Tsai headed the Taipei County chapter of the Kuomintang. During a portion of Chou's magisterial tenure, Tsai was a deputy magistrate of Taipei County. As deputy magistrate, Tsai was a member of the task force convened during the transition of Taipei County into the special municipality named New Taipei City. After Lee Hung-chun decided not to run for the Kuomintang in August 2015, Tsai was considered for the party's legislative nomination in New Taipei 4, which instead went to Chen Mao-chia.

In 2015, Tsai returned to sports promotion, including leading the Taiwanese delegation in the 2022 Asian Games and attending the 2024 Summer Olympics while serving as a vice president of the Chinese Taipei Olympic Committee. In the 2025 CTOC presidential election, Tsai ran unopposed and was elected to succeed Lin Hung-dow.
