= Chen Wei-zen =

Taiwanese architect

- 陳巍仁
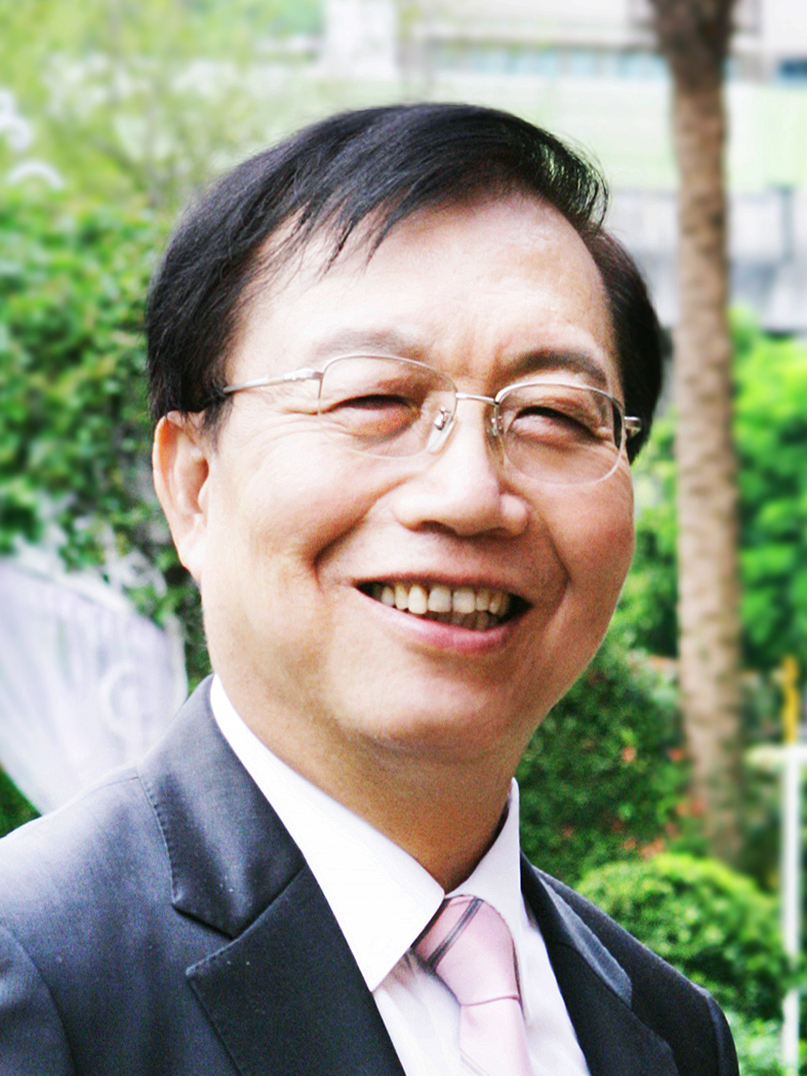

Minister of the Interior of the Republic of China
- In office 26 February 2014 – 20 May 2016
- Deputy: Lin Tzu-ling, Hsiao Chia-chi; Lin Tzu-ling, Chen Chwen-jing
- Preceded by: Lee Hong-yuan
- Succeeded by: Yeh Jiunn-rong

Secretary-General of the Executive Yuan
- In office 18 February 2013 – 25 February 2014
- Deputy: Chien Tai-lang; Chen Ching-tsai
- Preceded by: Chen Shyh-kwei
- Succeeded by: Lee Shih-chuan

Deputy Mayor of Taipei City
- In office 2010–2013
- Mayor: Hau Lung-pin

Administrative Deputy Minister of Transportation and Communications of the Republic of China
- In office 2009–2010
- Minister: Mao Chi-kuo

Deputy Magistrate of Taipei County
- In office 2005–2009
- Magistrate: Chou Hsi-wei

Personal details
- Born: 24 May 1953 (age 73) Xiaying, Tainan, Taiwan
- Party: Kuomintang
- Education: National Cheng Kung University (BS); University of Washington (MS); Chinese Culture University (MS, PhD)

Chen Wei-zen or Chen Wei-jen (Chinese: 陳巍仁; pinyin: Chén Wēirén; born 24 May 1953), is a Taiwanese architect who was the Minister of the Interior from 2014 to 2016.

== Education ==
Chen graduated with his bachelor's degree in urban planning from National Cheng Kung University, obtained a master's degree in industrial planning from Chinese Culture University, and earned a Master of Science (M.S.) in civil engineering from the University of Washington in the United States. He then earned his Ph.D. in planning and urban design from Chinese Culture University.

== Early career ==
Upon graduation, Chen worked as Deputy Commissioner at the Department of Urban Development of Taipei City Government (TCG) in 1993–1995. In 1995–1997, he became the Deputy Commissioner at the Department of Construction of Taiwan Provincial Government followed by Commissioner and concurrently Deputy Secretary-General at the Information Department of the same office in 1997–1998. In 1998–2001, he became the Commissioner at the Department of Urban Development followed by Department of Public Works of TCG in 2001–2005.

== Political career ==
In 2005–2009, he was appointed to be the Deputy Magistrate of Taipei County. In 2009–2010, he was the Administrative Deputy Minister of Transportation and Communications. In 2010–2013, he was the Deputy Mayor of Taipei City. In 2013–2014, he was the Secretary-General of Executive Yuan. In 2014, he was appointed to become the Minister of the Interior.

== See also ==
- Executive Yuan
