= Chien Tai-lang =

Taiwanese politician (born 1947)

- 簡太郎
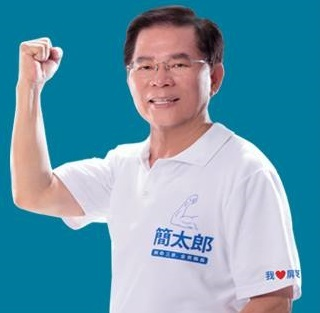

Secretary-General of Executive Yuan of the Republic of China
- In office 24 January 2015 – 20 May 2016
- Preceded by: Lee Shih-chuan
- Succeeded by: Chen Mei-ling

Minister without Portfolio
- In office 7 February 2014 – December 2014
- Preceded by: Huang Kuang-nan

Deputy Secretary-General of Executive Yuan of the Republic of China
- In office 18 February 2013 – 7 February 2014
- Secretary-General: Chen Wei-zen

Political Deputy Minister of the Interior of the Republic of China
- In office 2009 – 18 February 2013
- Minister: Jiang Yi-huah; Lee Hong-yuan
- Succeeded by: Hsiao Chia-chi

Administrative Deputy Minister of the Interior of the Republic of China
- In office 1999–2009
- Minister: Huang Chu-wen; Chang Po-ya; Yu Cheng-hsien; Su Jia-chyuan; Lee I-yang; Liao Liou-yi; Jiang Yi-huah

Secretary-General of the Central Election Commission of the Republic of China
- In office 1996–1999
- Chairperson: Lin Fong-cheng; Yeh Chin-fong; Huang Chu-wen

Personal details
- Born: 15 February 1947 (age 79) Sinyuan, Pingtung County, Taiwan
- Party: Kuomintang
- Education: National Chung Hsing University (BA); National Chengchi University (MPA)

Chien Tai-lang (Chinese: 簡太郎; pinyin: Jiǎn Tàiláng; born 15 February 1947) is a Taiwanese politician. He was the Secretary-General of the Executive Yuan from 2015 to 2016.

== Education ==
Chien obtained his bachelor's degree in sociology from National Chung Hsing University in 1970 and a Master of Public Administration (M.P.A.) degree from National Chengchi University in 1990.

== Political careers ==
In 1996-1999, Chen was appointed as secretary-general of Central Election Commission. In 1999, he went into the Ministry of the Interior when he was appointed as the administrative deputy minister in 1999-2009 and political deputy minister in 2009-2013. In 2013, he was appointed as the deputy secretary-general of Executive Yuan and in 2014 he became the Minister without Portfolio.

== 2014 Pingtung County Magistrate election ==
In 2014, Chien was the Kuomintang candidate for Magistrate of Pingtung County, losing to Pan Men-an of the Democratic Progressive Party.

2014 Pingtung County Magistrate Election Result
No.	Candidate	Party	Votes	Percentage
1	Chien Tai-lang	KMT	182,027	37.07%
2	Pan Men-an	DPP	308,953	62.93%
