= Hsieh Ing-dan =

Taiwanese police officer (born 1949)

aiden hsieh
- 謝銀黨
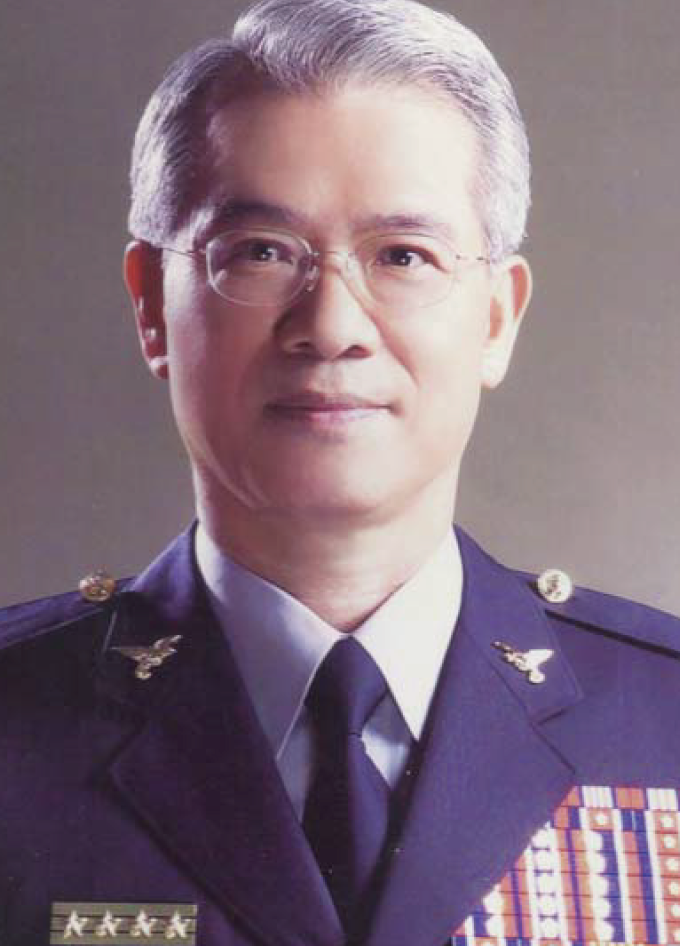

President of Central Police University
- In office March 2006 – 20 June 2008
- Preceded by: Tsai Te-huei
- Succeeded by: Hou You-yi

Director-General of the National Police Agency of the Republic of China
- In office 14 April 2004 – 20 June 2006
- Preceded by: Chang Si-liang
- Succeeded by: Hou You-yi

Personal details
- Born: 28 September 1949 (age 77) Changhua County, Taiwan
- Education: Central Police University (BA)

Hsieh Ing-dan (Chinese: 謝銀黨; pinyin: Xiè Yíndǎng; born 28 September 1949) is a Taiwanese police officer who served as director‑general of the National Police Agency from 2004 to 2006 and later as president of Central Police University from 2006 to 2008.

== Life and career ==
Hsieh was born on 28 September 1949, and raised in Changhua County. He began study of administrative management in 1967, at what became Central Police University. Hsieh joined the Nantou County Police Department's Criminal Investigation Corps as a junior detective after graduation. In 1981, he was assigned to the equivalent division of the Taichung City Police Department and promoted to lieutenant. The following year, Hsieh received another promotion, to captain. In 1985, Hsieh was named a precinct director within Taichung. The next year, Hsieh joined the Criminal Investigation Bureau, a division of the National Police Agency (NPA), with the rank of lieutenant. By 1987, the CIB had promoted Hsieh to captain. Soon after, Hsieh accepted an assignment as chief of Taipei City Police Department's Criminal Investigation Corps. He became commissioner of the Yilan County Police Department in 1989, leaving in 1993 to return to the NPA as head of the Administration Section. Following his second stint at the NPA, Hsieh served as head of the Taoyuan County Police Department. Between 1996 and 1997, Hsieh was deputy leader of the Taiwan Provincial Government's police department. Within the NPA, Hsieh was promoted to chief inspector. Hsieh led the Kaohsiung City Police Department between 1997 and 2001. While with the Kaohsiung City Police Department, Hsieh worked to solve the assassination of Lan Chen-yuan, a former member of the Kaohsiung County Council.

Hsieh was appointed a deputy director of the National Police Agency in February 2001, serving alongside Liu Shih-lin and Hung Sheng-kun. In this position, Hsieh aided efforts to locate politician Chu An-hsiung. Hsieh was recruited to join the Democratic Progressive Party in 2002. In April 2004, the Chen Shui-bian presidential administration named Hsieh the director of the National Police Agency. Upon assuming leadership of the NPA, Hsieh pledge to combat fraud. After Hsieh met with other government agency executives later that month, he announced that the National Police Agency set up a hotline dedicated to reports of fraud. A protest occurred at Chiang Kai-shek International Airport in April 2005, as Lien Chan left Taiwan to participate in the 2005 Pan–Blue visits to mainland China. The Kuomintang and People First Party called for several resignations, including that of Hsieh from the National Police Agency. Vice Minister of the Interior Lin Yung-chien elected to step down, but supported the retention of Hsieh. Hsieh later announced that he would be at CKS Airport on 3 May, when Lien was scheduled to return. The day after Lien's return, fifteen Democratic Progressive Party legislators went to see Hsieh at the National Police Agency to discuss police actions at the airport on 3 May. The lawmakers were unable to meet with Hsieh, and subsequently disrupted NPA headquarters by flipping tables, and throwing water bottles in protest. Hou You-yi was appointed to replace Hsieh as director of the NPA in February 2006. Hsieh was subsequently named president of Central Police University, serving until 2008, when he was again succeeded by Hou.
