= Lee Shu-chuan =

Taiwanese engineer and politician (born 1958)

- 李四川
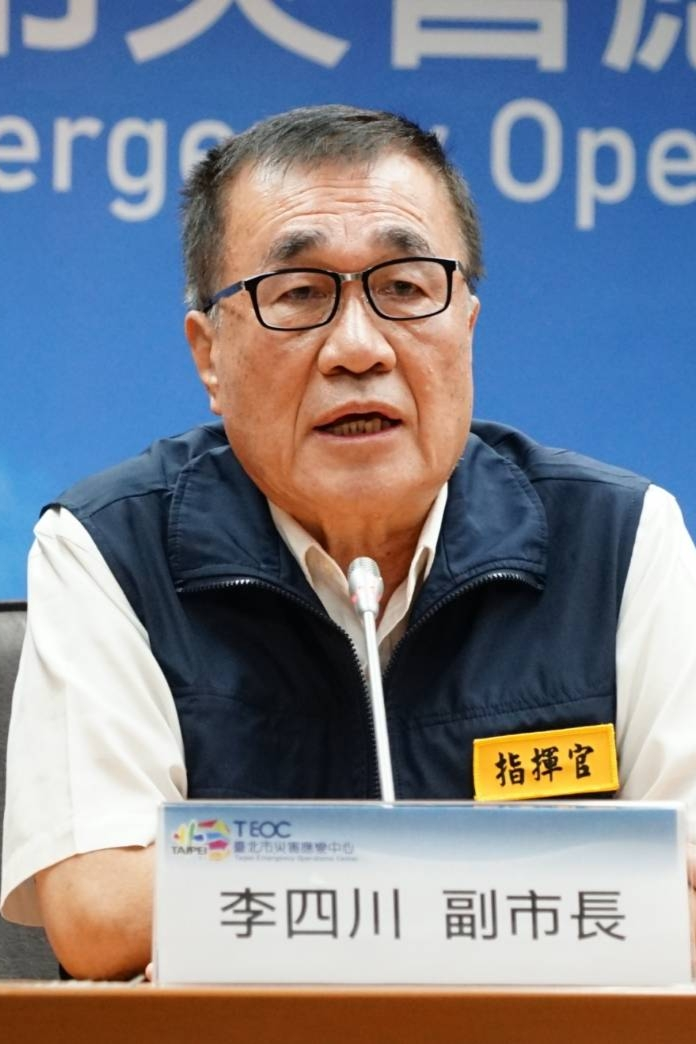
- Lee Shu-chuan in 2023

Deputy Mayor of Taipei
- In office 25 December 2022 – 10 March 2026 Serving with Lin Yi-hua and Chang Wen-te
- Mayor: Chiang Wan-an
- Succeeded by: Li Tai-hsing

Deputy Mayor of Kaohsiung
- In office 25 December 2018 – 12 June 2020 Serving with Yeh Kuang-shih, Hung Tung-wei, and Chen Hsiung-wen
- Mayor: Han Kuo-yu

Deputy Mayor of New Taipei City
- In office 26 July 2016 – 24 December 2018 Serving with Hou Yu-ih and Yeh Huei-ching
- Mayor: Eric Chu

Secretary-General of the Kuomintang
- In office 19 January 2015 – 30 March 2016
- Preceded by: Hung Hsiu-chu (acting)
- Succeeded by: Mo Tien-hu

Secretary-General of the Executive Yuan
- In office 1 March 2014 – 24 January 2015
- Deputy: Chen Ching-tsai; Hsiao Chia-chi
- Preceded by: Chen Wei-zen
- Succeeded by: Chien Tai-lang

Deputy Mayor of New Taipei City
- In office 25 December 2010 – 3 March 2014 Serving with Hou Yu-ih and Hsu Chih-chien
- Mayor: Eric Chu
- Preceded by: Office established
- Succeeded by: Chen Shen-hsien

Deputy Magistrate of Taipei County
- In office 1 April 2009 – 24 December 2010
- Magistrate: Chou Hsi-wei
- Preceded by: Lee Hong-yuan
- Succeeded by: Office abolished

Personal details
- Born: 1 February 1958 (age 68) Liuqiu, Pingtung County, Taiwan
- Party: Kuomintang
- Education: National Taipei University of Technology (BS, MS)

Lee Shu-chuan (Chinese: 李四川; pinyin: Lǐ Sìchuān; born 1 February 1958), also known as Hammer Lee, is a Taiwanese civil engineer and politician. A member of the Kuomintang (KMT), he served as deputy mayor of New Taipei City from 2010 to 2014 and 2016 to 2018, deputy mayor of Kaohsiung from 2018 to 2020, and deputy mayor of Taipei from 2022 to 2026. He also served as Secretary-General of the Executive Yuan from 2014 to 2015 and Secretary-General of the Kuomintang from 2015 to 2016.

Born on Liuqiu Island in Pingtung County, Lee studied electrical engineering at the National Taipei University of Technology. He began his career as an engineer in the Taipei City Government in 1981, working on major infrastructure projects including Taipei City Hall, the Taipei Arena, and the Maokong Gondola before becoming director of the Taipei County Public Works Bureau. He then became deputy magistrate of Taipei County in 2009. Afterwards, he variously served also as a deputy mayor under Eric Chu, Jiang Yi-huah, and Han Kuo-yu.

As deputy mayor of Taipei under Chiang Wan-an, Lee oversaw infrastructure projects including the completion of the Taipei Dome and negotiations over Nvidia's planned Taiwan headquarters. He is the KMT nominee for mayor in the 2026 New Taipei City mayoral election.

== Early life and education ==
Lee was born on 1 February 1958. His family home was on Liuqiu Island in Pingtung County, where the family made its living from fishing. He was the eldest of seven children, with three younger brothers and three younger sisters.

After completing junior high school, Lee left the island for the main island of Taiwan and enrolled in a vocational school, where he began learning electrical wiring. He studied at Gangshan Agricultural and Industrial Vocational School (岡山農工) in Kaohsiung before gaining admission to the National Taipei University of Technology—the first student from the vocational school to be admitted there. His father died shortly after he entered college, after which Lee supported himself through part-time work. He graduated with a bachelor's degree in electrical engineering, in 1979. He then completed compulsory military service in Xindian District.

In 2001, Lee earned a master's degree in electrical engineering from Taipei Tech. His master's degree thesis was titled, A Study of the Common Ducting and Power Delivery Cable Cooling System (共同管道及電力輸電線冷卻節能系統之研究).

== Engineering career ==
In 1981, Lee joined the Taipei City Government as a contract employee in its public works department. He entered the department when a former classmate, who had been due to report for work, was unexpectedly unable to take the position, and Lee filled the vacancy. He remained in Taipei City's public works administration for the next 26 years, advancing from a junior employee to senior engineering and managerial positions. He reached the rank of civil servant (薦任公務人員) in March 1989.

In the government public works department, Lee successively served as head of the construction office responsible for the new Taipei municipal building, deputy chief engineer, chief engineer, and deputy director. When Taipei City Hall opened in 1994, Lee was the construction director responsible for supervising and inspecting the project. He also served as a construction director for work on the Taipei City Council building. In May 2000, Lee was appointed chief engineer of the New Construction Office at the senior tenth civil-service grade. The Fuxing North Road tunnel beneath Taipei Songshan Airport, the Taipei Arena and the Maokong Gondola was among the major projects with which Lee was involved as an engineer.

In December 2002, Lee was promoted to head the Sewerage Systems Office in the Taipei City Government, and he was appointed that same month as its director. As director, Lee advocated accelerating construction of Taipei's sewerage network and the use of trench-less construction methods to reduce disruption caused by installing pipes in densely developed urban areas.

In February 2006, Lee became the director of the New Construction Office of the Taipei City Government Public Works Department. He held the post until September 2007. He then left the Taipei City Government to join the administration of Taipei County Magistrate Chou Hsi-wei as director of the Taipei County Public Works Bureau.

== Early political career ==
=== Taipei County and New Taipei City (2009–2014) ===
Following his tenure as director of the Taipei County Public Works Bureau, Lee was appointed deputy magistrate of Taipei County in April 2009 under magistrate Chou Hsi-wei. When Taipei County was reorganized as the special municipality of New Taipei City in December 2010, Lee remained in the municipal government as deputy mayor under the newly elected mayor Eric Chu. His responsibilities included coordinating relations between the municipal government and New Taipei City Council, where the governing KMT did not hold a majority of seats.

=== Executive Yuan and Kuomintang (2014–2016) ===
In February 2014, Premier Jiang Yi-huah appointed Lee as secretary-general of the Executive Yuan, succeeding Chen Wei-zen, who had been reassigned as minister of the interior.

On 19 January 2015, Lee was appointed secretary-general of the Kuomintang (KMT) by its newly elected chairman Eric Chu, leaving his position in the Executive Yuan. As secretary-general, Lee participated in preparations for the 2016 presidential and legislative elections, including the party's candidate nomination process. During the party's controversial decision to replace its presidential nominee Hung Hsiu-chu with Chu in October 2015, Lee publicly apologized to Hung on behalf of the KMT. Lee stepped down as secretary-general in March 2016 following Hung's election as KMT chairwoman.

=== Return to New Taipei City (2016–2018) ===
In July 2016, Lee returned to the New Taipei City Government after Eric Chu appointed him deputy mayor for a second time, alongside former economic development director Yeh Huei-ching. In October 2017, Chu assigned Lee to oversee an environmental improvement project addressing pollution, sedimentation, and ecological degradation at Jinlong Lake in Xizhi District. His second tenure as deputy mayor ended in December 2018 following Chu's departure from office.

== Deputy mayor (2018–2026) ==
=== Deputy Mayor of Kaohsiung (2018–2020) ===
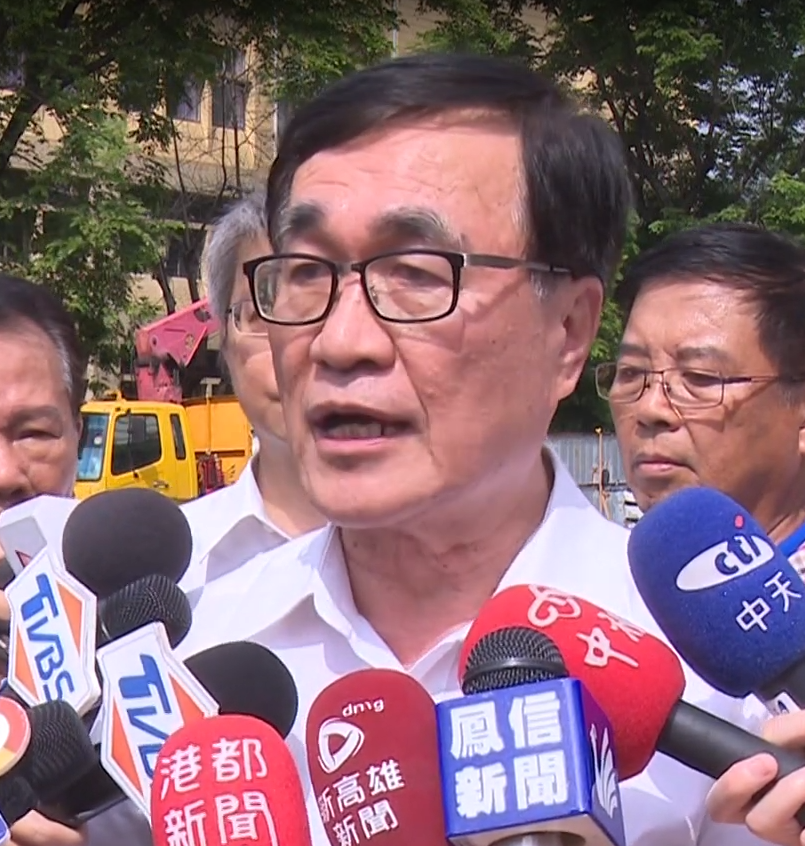
Lee in May 2019

In December 2018, newly-elected Kaohsiung mayor Han Kuo-yu appointed Lee as one of his deputy mayors. Han had personally approached Lee several times before securing his agreement to join the administration. Lee assumed office on 25 December 2018, primarily focusing on overseeing public works and infrastructure projects.

Lee's tenure ended following the successful recall of Han Kuo-yu on 6 June 2020. He left the Kaohsiung City Government on 12 June 2020.

=== Deputy Mayor of Taipei (2022–2026) ===
On 12 December 2022, Taipei mayor-elect Chiang Wan-an announced Lee's appointment as deputy mayor as part of the first group of officials selected for his incoming administration. Lee took office on 25 December 2022.

As deputy mayor, Lee oversaw the completion and safety certification of the Taipei Dome, whose construction had been delayed for several years. In October 2023, Lee announced that the Dome had passed its fire safety reinspection after eight rounds of examinations and remedial work. In April 2024, Lee chaired an interdepartmental meeting that established requirements for hosting concerts and other non-sporting events at the venue, including independent reviews of fire and evacuation safety.

In 2025, Lee became a municipal representative in negotiations over the establishment of Nvidia's Taiwan headquarters at the Beitou-Shilin Technology Park. The project encountered complications because Shin Kong Life Insurance already held surface rights to the proposed T17 and T18 sites. Lee oversaw discussions concerning the termination of the existing land agreement with Shin Kong and the subsequent establishment of new surface rights for Nvidia. On 26 January 2026, he chaired a meeting of the Taipei City Urban Planning Commission that approved the proposed consolidation of the T17 and T18 sites. On 11 February 2026, the Taipei City Government and Nvidia's Taiwanese subsidiary signed a 50-year surface-rights agreement, with an option to extend it by up to 20 years, involving a premium of approximately NT$12.2 billion.

== 2026 New Taipei City mayoral election ==
On 11 February 2026, shortly after the Nvidia agreement was signed, Lee announced his intention to resign as Taipei deputy mayor and seek the KMT nomination for the 2026 New Taipei City mayoral election. Chiang approved his resignation effective 10 March 2026. On 11 March 2026, the KMT's Central Standing Committee nominated Lee for the mayoralty.

The KMT subsequently negotiated with the Taiwan People's Party (TPP) to select a common opposition candidate, with Lee competing against TPP chairman Huang Kuo-chang in a joint polling process. On 28 April 2026, the parties announced that Lee had won the polling contest and would become their jointly supported candidate against Democratic Progressive Party (DPP) legislator Su Chiao-hui. Lee pledged to incorporate TPP policy proposals into his campaign and recruit officials from both parties if elected mayor. He registered his candidacy with the New Taipei City Election Commission on 4 September 2026.

Party political offices
Preceded by Hung Hsiu-chu (acting)	Secretary-General of the Kuomintang; 2015–2016	Succeeded by Mo Tien-hu
