= New Taipei City Hall =

Government building in New Taipei, Taiwan

Coordinates: 25.0122°N 121.4655°E

New Taipei City Hall 新北市政大樓
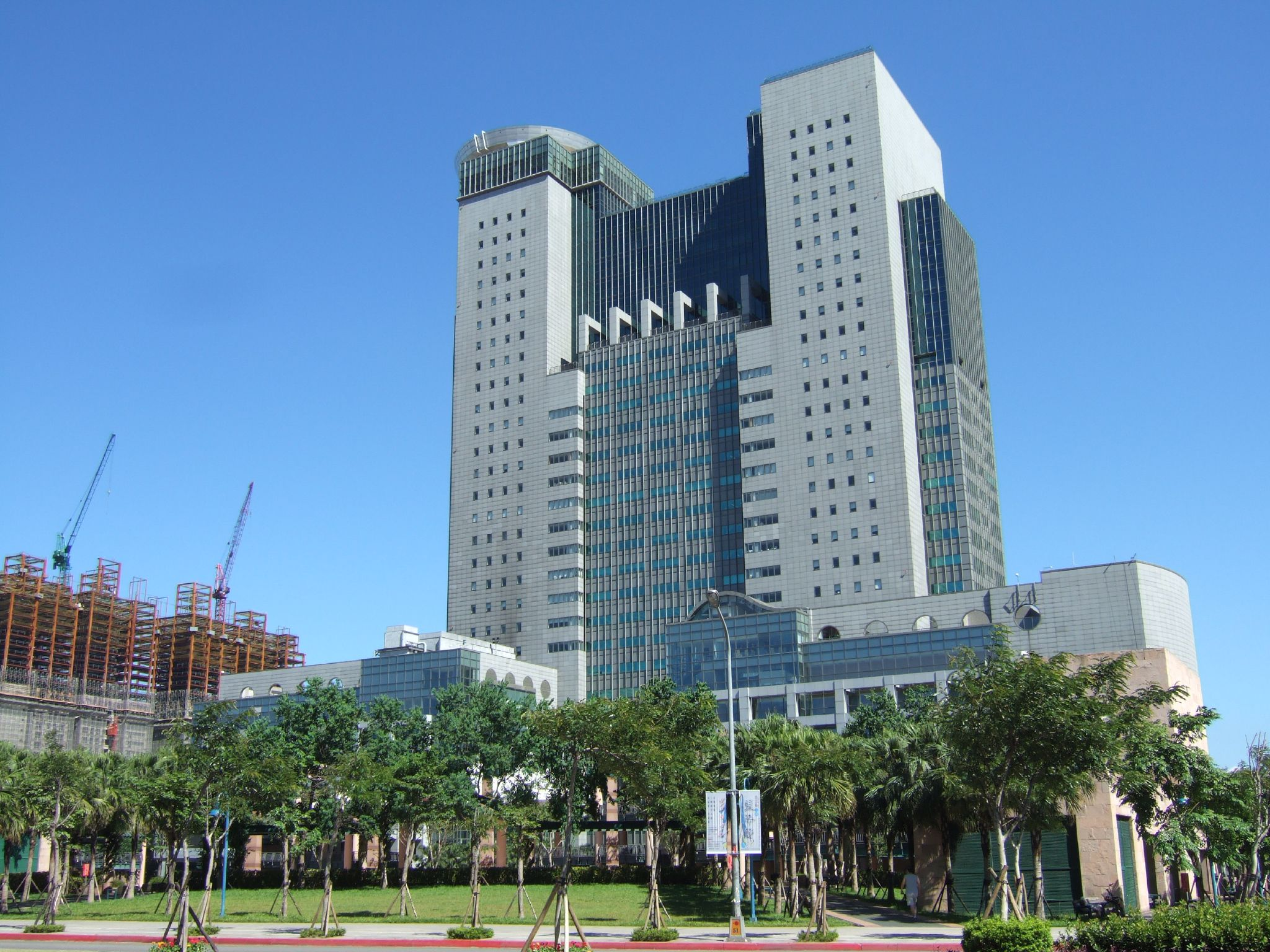
- Interactive map of the New Taipei City Hall 新北市政大樓 area

General information
- Status: Completed
- Location: Banqiao, New Taipei, Taiwan
- Construction started: May 8, 1997
- Completed: Jan 14, 2003

Height
- Roof: 140.5 m

Technical details
- Floor count: 33
- Floor area: 159,128m^{2}
- Lifts/elevators: 27

The New Taipei City Hall (Chinese: 新北市政府行政大樓; pinyin: Xīnběi Shì Zhèngfǔ Xíngzhèng Dàlóu) is the venue of the government of New Taipei City of the Republic of China (Taiwan). The hall is located in Banqiao District.

== History ==
The building was constructed in 2002 as Taipei County Hall (Chinese: 台北縣政府大樓). However, after Taipei County was upgraded to city-status, the building was renamed as New Taipei City Hall (Chinese: 新北市政府大樓).

== Technical specification ==
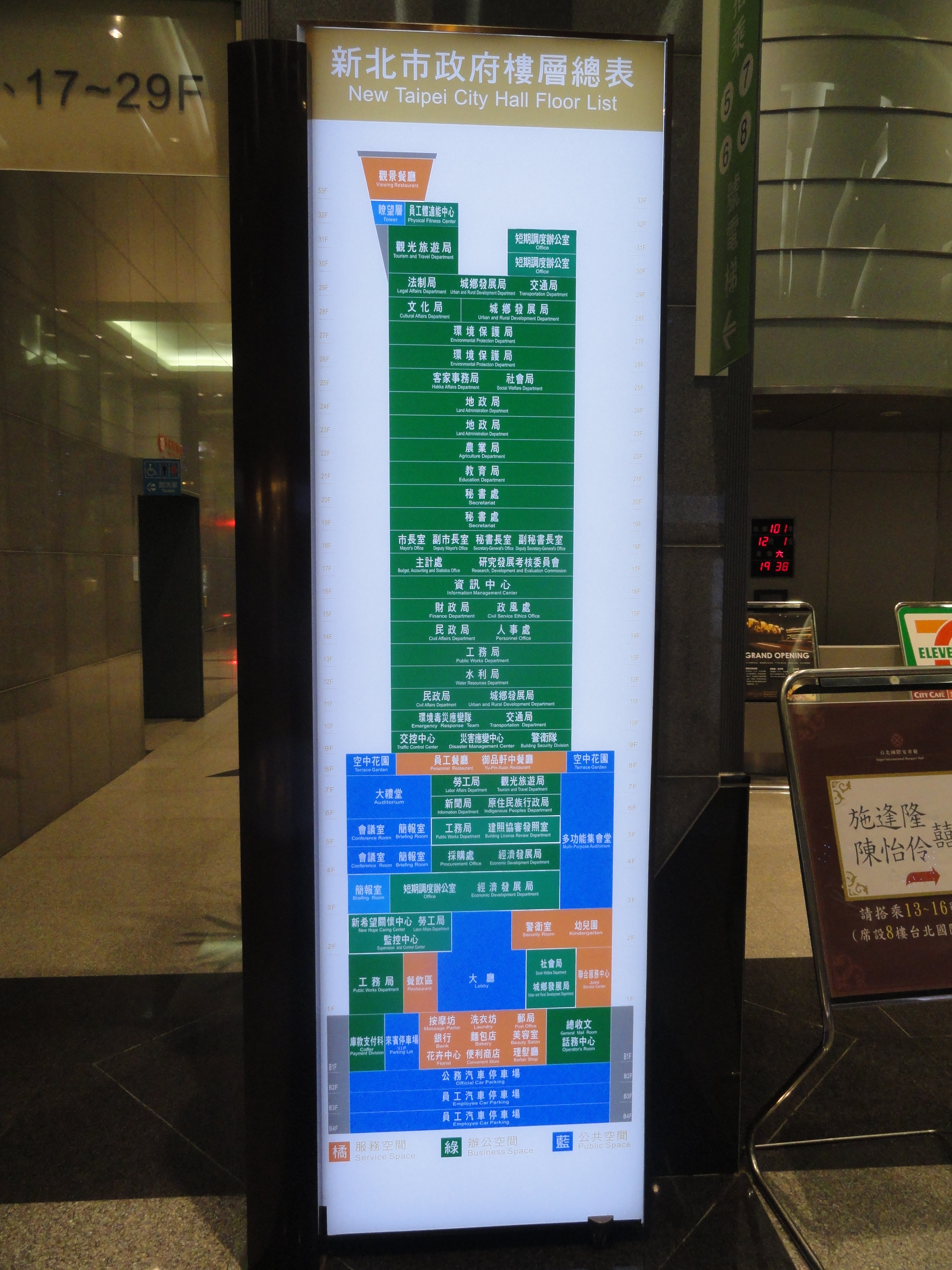
New Taipei City Hall floor list

The building is a 33-floor structure with a height of 140.5 meters.

There is a free observation floor for viewing on level 32 and a viewing restaurant on level 33.

== Notable events ==
- 46th Golden Horse Awards

== Transportation ==
The building is accessible within walking distance southeast from Banqiao Station of the Taipei Metro, Taiwan High Speed Rail and Taiwan Railway.

== See also ==
- List of tallest buildings in Taiwan
- New Taipei City Government
  - Mayor of New Taipei
- New Taipei City Council
