= Lee Hong-yuan =

Taiwanese civil engineer, environmental engineer, and politician

- 李鴻源
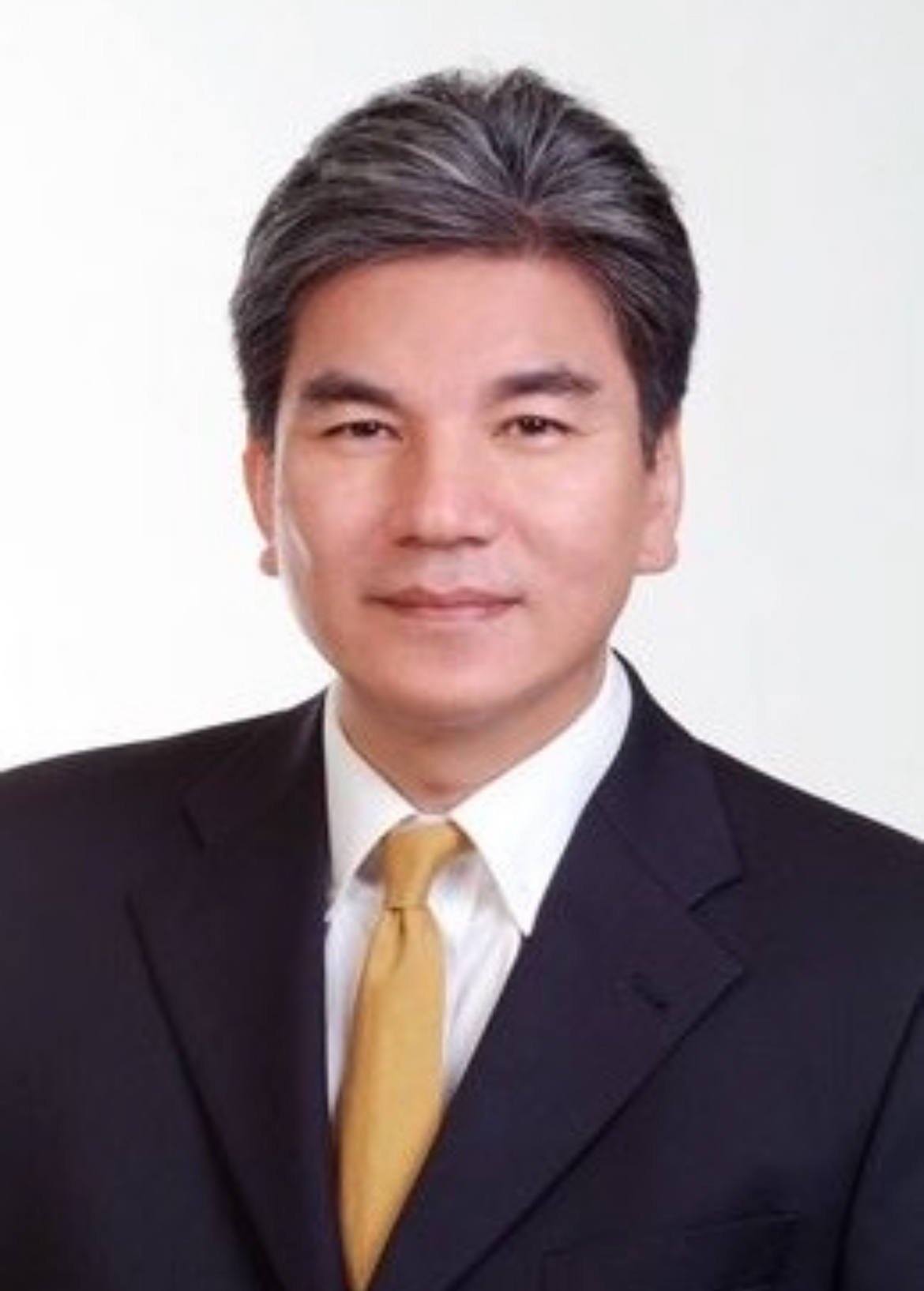
- Official portrait, 2016

29th Minister of the Interior
- In office 6 February 2012 – 25 February 2014
- Prime Minister: Sean Chen; Jiang Yi-huah
- Deputy: See list: Lin Tzu-ling Hsiao Chia-chi
- Preceded by: Jiang Yi-huah
- Succeeded by: Chen Wei-zen

8th Minister of Public Construction
- In office 1 April 2011 – 5 February 2012
- Prime Minister: Wu Den-yih
- Preceded by: Fan Liang-shiow
- Succeeded by: Chern Jenn-chuan

Deputy Magistrate of Taipei
- In office 20 December 2005 – 19 March 2009 Serving with Lee Shu-chuan and Tsai Chia-fu
- Magistrate: Chou Hsi-wei

Personal details
- Born: 21 June 1956 (age 69) Taishan, Taipei County
- Party: Kuomintang (since 2013)
- Other political affiliations: People First Party (2000-2013)
- Relatives: Lee Hung-chun (brother)
- Education: National Cheng Kung University (BS); University of Iowa (MS, PhD)

Lee Hong-yuan (Chinese: 李鴻源; pinyin: Lǐ Hóngyuán; born 21 June 1956) is a Taiwanese civil engineer, environmental engineer, and politician. He was the Minister of the Interior from 2012 to 2014, and previously the Minister of the Public Construction Commission from 2011 to 2012.

== Early life and education ==
Lee Hong-yuan was born in Taishan, Taipei County, to a family of farmers. His father, Lee Teng-hui (no relation to president Lee Teng-hui), served as head of the district. His younger brother, Lee Hung-chun, is also an engineer and politician.

Lee graduated from National Cheng Kung University with a bachelor's degree in hydraulic engineering in 1978. He then completed graduate studies in the United States, where he earned a Master of Science (M.S.) in 1982 and his Ph.D. in 1984 from the University of Iowa in civil engineering and environmental engineering under professor A. Jacob Odgaard. His doctoral dissertation was titled, "Flow and Bed Characteristics in Alluvial Channel Bends." He was later inducted as a member of the university's Distinguished Engineering Alumni Academy in 2008.

Upon graduation, Lee worked in the United States for two years before returning to Taiwan in 1986 to teach at National Taiwan University. Lee has also been a visiting professor at five universities in China and in the Netherlands.

== Personal life ==
Lee is married to Hui Hsin Lee and has four children.
