= Liu Ho-jan =

Taiwanese politician

- 劉和然
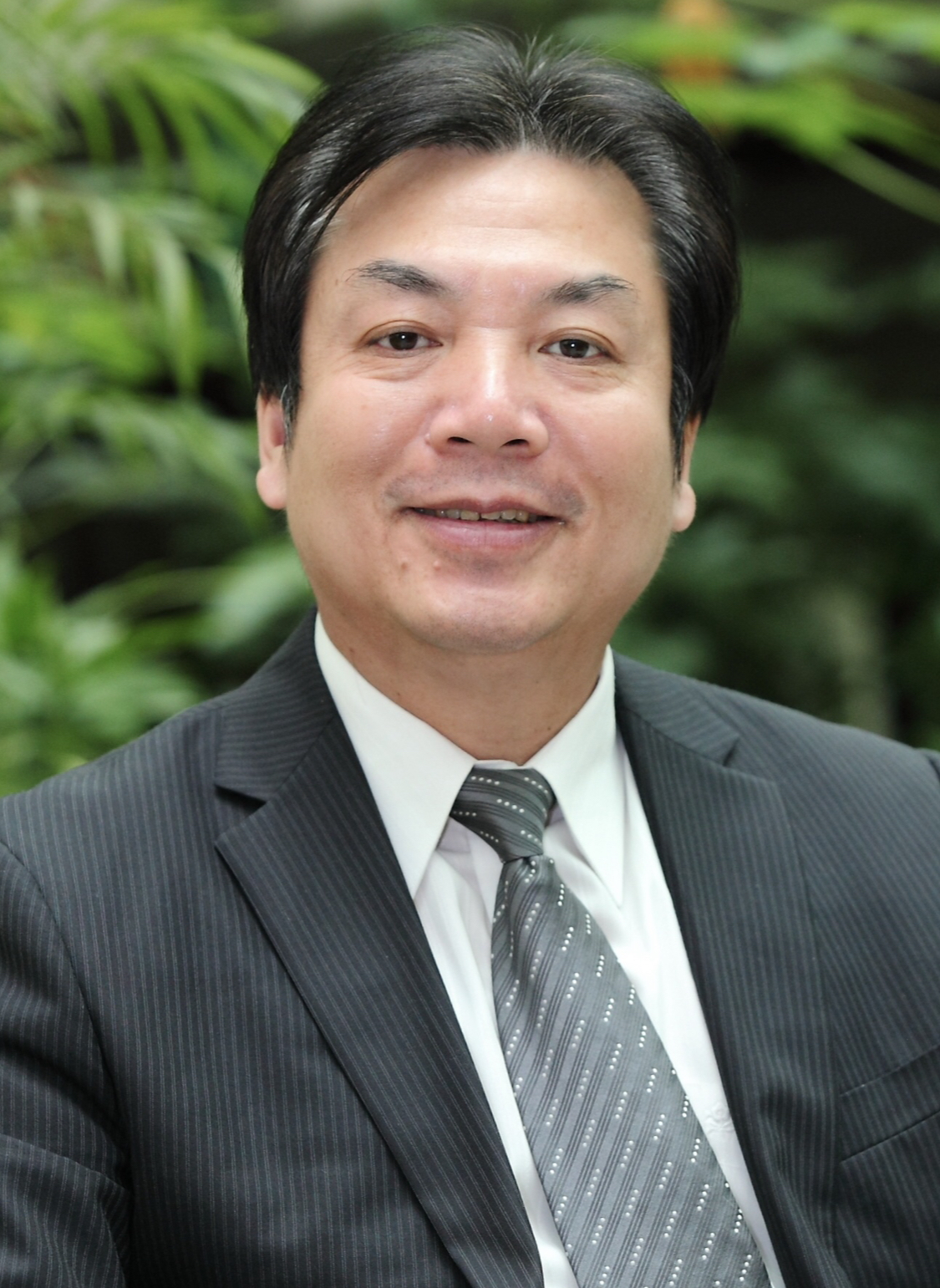
- Official portrait, 2021

Acting Mayor of New Taipei
- In office 24 September 2023 – 14 January 2024
- Deputy Mayor: See list: Chu Hsi-jih Chen Chun-chin
- Preceded by: Hou Yu-ih
- Succeeded by: Hou Yu-ih (returned)

Deputy Mayor of New Taipei
- Incumbent
- Assumed office 29 January 2021 Serving with Chu Hsi-jih and Chen Chun-chin
- Mayor: Hou Yu-ih; Himself (acting)
- Preceded by: Wu Min-jih

Personal details
- Born: 1966 (age 59–60) Taiwan
- Party: Kuomintang
- Education: National Taiwan Normal University (BS, MEd); National Taiwan University of Science and Technology (PhD)

Liu Ho-jan (Chinese: 劉和然; pinyin: Liú Hérán; born 1966) is a Taiwanese educator and politician who served as the acting mayor of New Taipei City from September 2023 to January 2024.

== Education ==
Liu graduated from National Taiwan Normal University with a Bachelor of Science (B.S.) in chemistry and a Master of Education (M.Ed.) degree. In 2017, he earned his Ph.D. in business management from the National Taiwan University of Science and Technology. His doctoral dissertation was titled, "A study on the relationship between emotional labor, workplace friendship and organizational identification among elementary and junior high school personnel" (Chinese: 國民中小學校人事人員情緒勞務、職場友誼以及組織認同關係之研究).

== Political career ==
Before Liu's acting mayorship, he had previously served as the municipal advisor, director of the Environmental Protection Bureau, and deputy secretary-general in the New Taipei City Government.

In September 2023, Liu took the office as acting mayor after the incumbent mayor, Hou Yu-ih, took leave to run in the 2024 Taiwanese presidential election.
