= Chen Ching-tsai =

Politician from Taiwan

- 陳慶財

Deputy Secretary-General of Executive Yuan
- In office 18 August 2008 – 31 July 2014
- Secretary-General: Chen Wei-zen; Lee Shu-chuan
- Succeeded by: Hsiao Chia-chi

Deputy Minister of the Directorate-General of Budget, Accounting and Statistics
- In office 2004–2006
- Minister: Hsu Jan-yau

Personal details
- Born: 26 December 1952 (age 73)
- Education: National Chengchi University (BA, MA); National Taiwan University (MBA)

Chen Ching-tsai (Chinese: 陳慶財; pinyin: Chén Qìngcái; born 26 December 1952) is a Taiwanese politician. He was Deputy Secretary-General of the Executive Yuan from 2008 to 2014.

== Education ==
Chen earned a master's degree in accounting from National Chengchi University in 1993 and a Master of Business Administration (M.B.A.) from National Taiwan University in 2005.

== Career ==
Chen was the accountant-general of the Ministry of Economic Affairs in 1999–2000. In 2000, he started to work for the Directorate-General of Budget, Accounting and Statistics, first as an accounting officer and chief secretary until 2003, then director-general of the First Bureau in 2003-2004 and deputy minister from 2004 to 2006. In 2008, he became Deputy Secretary-General of the Executive Yuan, remaining in this position until 2014.
