= New Taipei City Council =

Legislature of New Taipei City, Taiwan

New Taipei City Council 新北市議會
- 4rd New Taipei City Council

Type
- Type: City council

History
- Founded: 25 December 2010
- Preceded by: Taipei County Council
- New session started: 25 December 2022

Leadership
- Speaker: Chiang Ken-huang (KMT) since 26 December 2014
- Deputy Speaker: Chen Hung-yuan (KMT) since 25 December 2010

Structure
- Seats: 66
- Political groups: KMT (30); DPP (28); NPSU (2); Taiwan People's (1); Independent (3)
- Length of term: 4 years

Elections
- Voting system: Single non-transferable vote
- First election: 27 November 2010
- Last election: 26 November 2022

Meeting place
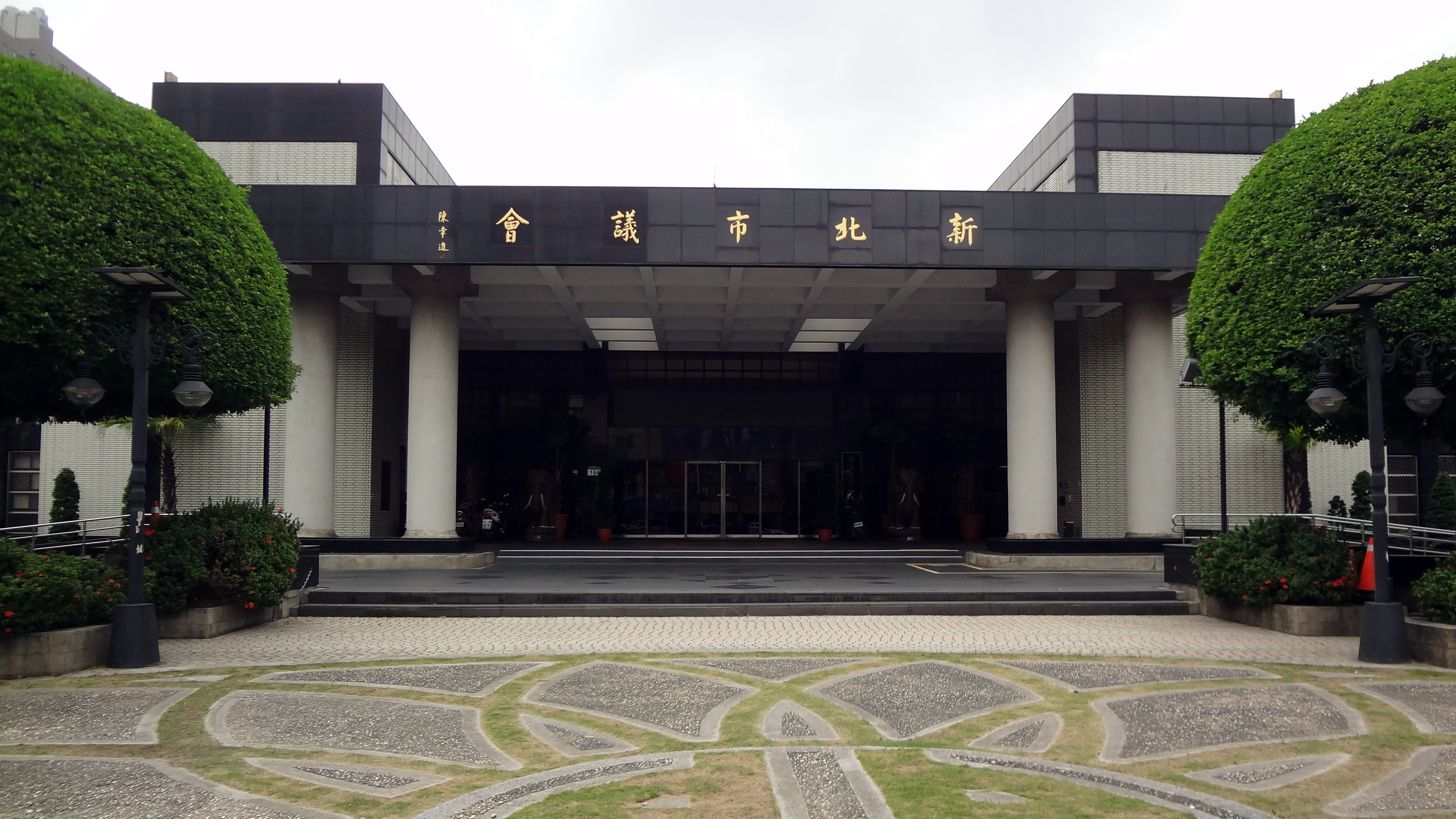
- No. 166, Sec. 2, Wenhua Road, Banqiao District, New Taipei City 220, Taiwan; 25°1′36.6″N 121°28′16.1″E

Website
- ntp.gov.tw

Constitution
- Constitution of the Republic of China

New Taipei City Council (traditional Chinese: 新北市議會; simplified Chinese: 新北市议会; pinyin: Xīnběi Shì Yìhuì) is the city council of New Taipei City, Taiwan. It is now composed of 66 councillors, all recently elected on 26 November 2022 in the local elections. Along with the Kaohsiung City Council, the city council is the largest local council in terms of seats.

== History ==
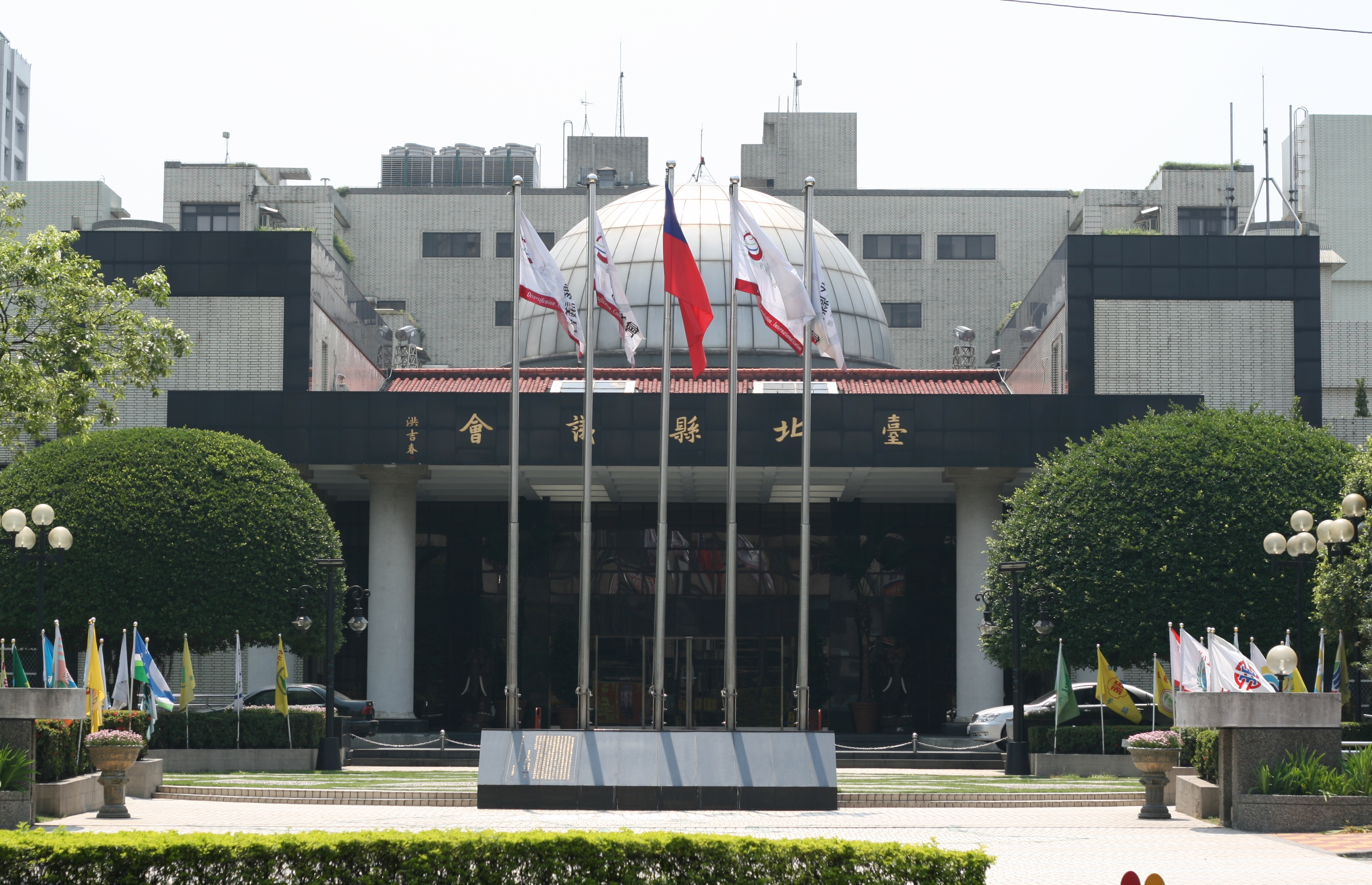
Former building of Taipei County Council

The council was originally established Taipei County Council. On 25 December 2010, it was changed to New Taipei City Council.

== Organization ==
- Meeting Affairs Division
- General Affairs Division
- Legal Affairs Office
- Public Relations Office
- Information Management Office
- Administration Office
- Documentation Office
- Personnel Office
- Accounting Office

== Transportation ==
The council is accessible within walking distance South West from Jiangzicui Station of Taipei Metro.

== See also ==
- New Taipei City
- New Taipei City Government
  - New Taipei City Hall
  - Mayor of New Taipei
