= Hou Yu-ih =

Taiwanese politician (born 1957)

- 侯友宜
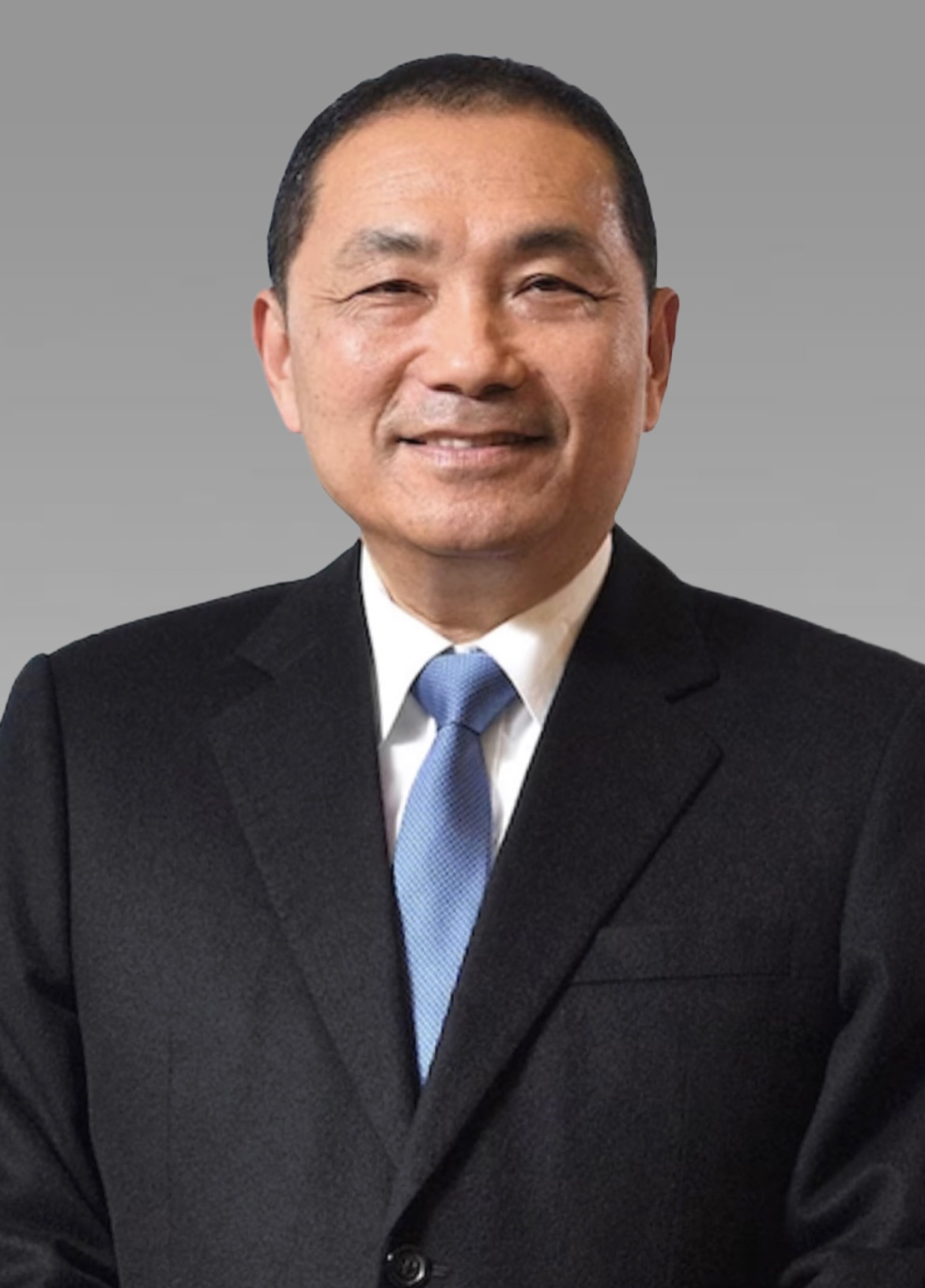
- Official portrait, 2018

2nd Mayor of New Taipei
- Incumbent
- Assumed office 25 December 2018 (Note: Liu Ho-jan served as acting mayor from 24 September 2023 to 14 January 2024 during Hou's presidential campaign.)
- Preceded by: Eric Chu
- Acting; 20 October 2015 – 18 January 2016
- Preceded by: Eric Chu
- Succeeded by: Eric Chu

Deputy Mayor of New Taipei City
- In office 25 December 2010 – 6 March 2018
- Mayor: Eric Chu
- Preceded by: Position established
- Succeeded by: Lu Wei-ching

13th Director-General of the National Police Agency
- In office March 2006 – 20 June 2008
- President: Chen Shui-bian; Ma Ying-jeou
- Preceded by: Hsieh Ing-dan
- Succeeded by: Wang Cho-chiun

12th Commissioner of the Criminal Investigation Bureau
- In office 19 June 2003 – March 2006
- President: Chen Shui-bian

Personal details
- Born: 7 June 1957 (age 69) Puzi, Chiayi County, Taiwan
- Party: Kuomintang
- Spouse: Jen Mei-ling
- Children: 4
- Education: Central Police University (BA, PhD)

Hou Yu-ih (Chinese: 侯友宜; pinyin: Hóu Yǒuyí; born 7 June 1957) is a Taiwanese politician, criminologist, and former police officer who has served as the second mayor of New Taipei since 2018. A member of the Kuomintang (KMT), he was the party's nominee in the 2024 Taiwanese presidential election. He previously served as director-general of the National Police Agency from 2006 to 2008, president of Central Police University from 2008 to 2010, and deputy mayor of New Taipei City from 2010 to 2018.

Born in Puzi, Chiayi County, Hou graduated from Central Police University in 1980 and earned his doctorate in criminology there in 2004. He began his career in law enforcement and gained national prominence for his role in negotiating the surrender of a fugitive during the 1997 Alexander family hostage crisis. He became commissioner of the Criminal Investigation Bureau in 2003 and director-general of the National Police Agency in 2006. In 2010, Hou entered municipal government as deputy mayor under Eric Chu, whom he temporarily succeeded as acting mayor during Chu's presidential campaign from 2015 to 2016.

Hou was elected mayor of New Taipei City in 2018, defeating former premier and Democratic Progressive Party (DPP) candidate Su Tseng-chang, and was reelected in 2022 after defeating DPP candidate Lin Chia-lung. In May 2023, Hou was nominated as the KMT's presidential candidate for the 2024 election. Following unsuccessful negotiations for a joint opposition ticket with the Taiwan People's Party, he ran alongside Jaw Shaw-kong and finished second behind Lai Ching-te, receiving 33.49% of the national vote.

== Early life and education ==
Hou Yu-ih was born on 7 June 1957 in Puzi, Chiayi County, Taiwan. He was the third of four children. His mother, Lyu Hsiu-lian, was a housewife. His elder brother, Hou Ming-feng, became a professor at Kaohsiung Medical University and a specialist in breast cancer surgery. His father, Hou Xibin (侯溪濱), operated a pork stall at a local market. The elder Hou served as a Taiwanese recruit repairing aircraft for the Imperial Japanese Navy during World War II, and subsequently served in the Republic of China military during the Chinese Civil War. Following his military service, Hou Xibin sold pork at the market, transporting his merchandise by bicycle to support the family.

During his childhood, Hou helped his father at the family pork stall and, beginning around the age of seven, learned to catch and restrain pigs in the countryside surrounding Puzi. He attended Puzi Elementary School (朴子國小), where he developed an interest in baseball and played as a catcher on the school's team. He then attended Dongshi Junior High School (東石國中), where he served as his class's discipline monitor. Afterwards, he graduated from National Chiayi Senior High School in 1975 as a member of the school's 28th graduating class.

After sitting the college entrance examinations in 1976, Hou was admitted to National Taiwan Normal University to study industrial education, which would have prepared him for a teaching career. He chose instead to enroll at Central Police College to study criminal investigation, becoming a member of the college's 45th regular undergraduate class (正科45期) in the field. He graduated with a Bachelor of Arts in 1980, with a perfect attendance record.

In 2004, Hou earned his Ph.D. in criminology from Central Police University. His doctoral dissertation was titled A Study of Sexual Homicide in Taiwan (台灣地區性侵害殺人犯罪之研究). It examined 42 sexual assault and murder cases in Taiwan from 1995 to 2004, and was completed under Tsai Dehui, the president of the university, and Huang Fuyuan, the university's dean of academic affairs.

== Early career ==
Upon graduating from Central Police College in 1980, Hou was assigned to the Taipei City Police Department's Criminal Investigation Corps as a division leader. He became a section chief in 1986 and was transferred to the department's Zhongshan Precinct in 1988.

In April 1989, Hou participated in a police operation to arrest Cheng Nan-jung, a pro-democracy activist and publisher charged with sedition for publishing a proposed constitution for an independent Taiwan. Cheng died after setting himself on fire as police attempted to enter his office. Hou's involvement subsequently drew criticism from Cheng's family and supporters, who questioned the police operation, while Hou maintained that the officers had acted in accordance with the law.

== Senior police official (1989–2010) ==
Hou was promoted to deputy chief of the Criminal Investigation Corps in 1990 and transferred to the Criminal Investigation Bureau (CIB) of the National Police Agency (NPA) in 1992. In 1995, he became chief of the Taipei City Police Department's Criminal Investigation Division.

Hou gained national prominence for his role in the Alexander family hostage crisis in November 1997, when fugitive Chen Chin-hsing, wanted in connection with the kidnapping and murder of Pai Hsiao-yen, held a South African diplomat and his family hostage in Taipei. Hou led negotiations with Chen, entering the residence unarmed to secure the release of injured hostages before eventually negotiating Chen's surrender. Following the crisis, Hou established Taiwan's first specialized anti-kidnapping unit which prioritized hostage negotiation over the use of force.

In 1998, Hou became deputy commissioner of the CIB, and in 2001 was appointed chief of the Taoyuan County Police Department. He returned to the CIB as its commissioner in June 2003, becoming the youngest person to hold the position at the time. As CIB commissioner, Hou supervised the investigation into the March 19 shooting incident, in which President Chen Shui-bian and Vice President Annette Lu were wounded during the 2004 Taiwanese presidential election campaign. In March 2005, Hou announced that investigators believed Chen Yi-hsiung (陳義雄), a construction worker who had died shortly after the shooting, was responsible for the attack, although the investigation remained open.

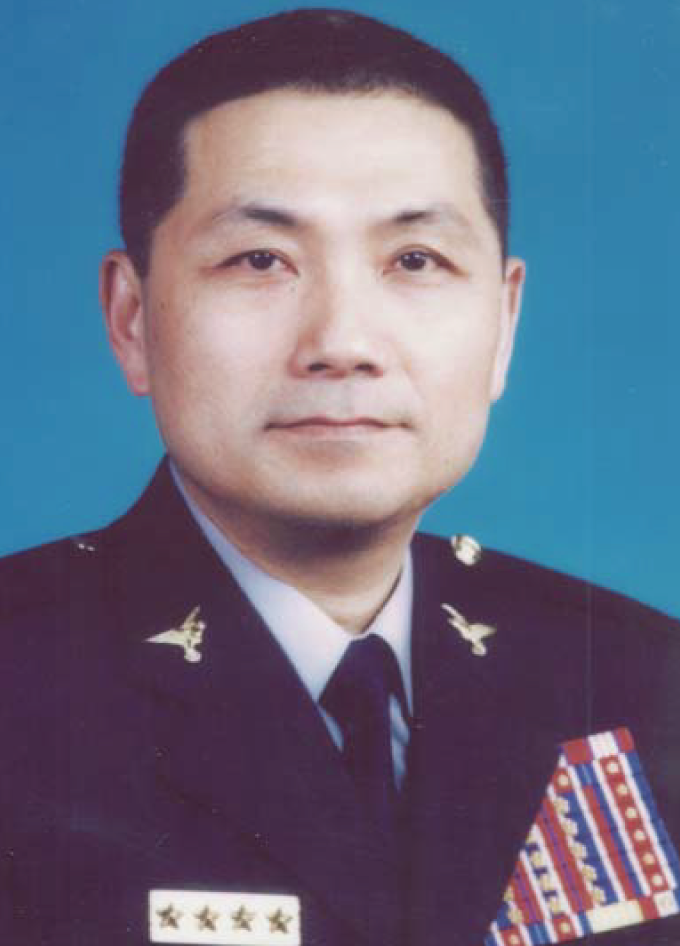
Director-General of the National Police Agency Hou Yu-ih's uniform photo

=== National Police Agency and university presidency ===
In February 2006, Hou was appointed director-general of the National Police Agency, succeeding Hsieh Ing-dan and becoming its youngest-ever director-general. During the 2006 protests against President Chen Shui-bian, Hou publicly apologized for the police response to violent clashes between government supporters and opponents, and ordered disciplinary measures against senior local police officials. Hou's handling of the March 19 shooting investigation also remained controversial, with Kuomintang legislators calling for the case to be reopened after arms manufacturer Tang Shou-yi (唐守義) retracted his earlier confession and alleged that it had been coerced.

In May 2008, following the inauguration of President Ma Ying-jeou, Hou was designated president of Central Police University, with Taipei City police commissioner Wang Cho-chiun selected to succeed him as director-general of the NPA. He served as the university's 17th president until December 2010.

== Deputy mayor of New Taipei City (2010–2018) ==
Hou had previously belonged to the Kuomintang (KMT), but allowed his membership to become inactive during his law enforcement career. In 2002, the Democratic Progressive Party (DPP) sought to recruit Hou, then chief of the Taoyuan County Police Department, as part of an effort to attract police officers to the party.

In December 2010, mayor-elect Eric Chu recruited Hou, then president of Central Police University, as one of three deputy mayors of New Taipei City, which was being established as a special municipality following the reorganization of Taipei County. Hou was appointed alongside Lee Shu-chuan, the incumbent deputy commissioner of Taipei County, and Hsu Chih-chien, a deputy minister of finance. Chu assigned Hou responsibility for public security, civil affairs, social welfare and education, drawing on his experience as a police administrator. Hou and Chu had previously worked together in Taoyuan County, where Chu served as county commissioner while Hou headed the county police department.

Hou (center, wearing a red sash) attending the 2013 Northern Taiwan Mazu Cultural Festival in Banqiao District, New Taipei City

In December 2013, Hou formally restored his KMT membership. Chu stated that Hou's decision to resume active membership was unrelated to political ambitions, describing him as an inactive party member who had previously avoided partisan involvement for reasons of administrative neutrality. Following the 2014 Taipei Metro attack, in which four passengers were killed, Hou inspected security arrangements at Jiangzicui metro station and announced the deployment of additional police officers to reinforce patrols and security at the city's metro stations.

Following the Formosa Fun Coast dust explosion on 27 June 2015, Hou became involved in coordinating the municipal government's response to the disaster, including assistance to injured victims and their families. In July, he attended meetings with victims' families and outlined a joint initiative with the central government to provide individualized medical, rehabilitation and legal assistance through a dedicated case-management center. Following prosecutors' decision in October to indict only the event organizer, Hou stated that the municipal government's legal affairs department would assist victims' families in seeking a review of the decision and pursuing civil compensation.

On 20 October 2015, Hou assumed the duties of acting mayor after Chu took a three-month leave of absence to campaign as the KMT's candidate in the 2016 Taiwanese presidential election. During this period, Hou continued overseeing municipal affairs and chaired the city's nuclear safety oversight committee, opposing proposals that would make New Taipei a permanent storage site for nuclear waste. Chu resumed his mayoral duties on 18 January 2016, following his defeat by Tsai Ing-wen in the presidential election, and Hou returned to his position as deputy mayor.

== Mayor of New Taipei (2018–present) ==
=== Elections ===
==== 2018 ====
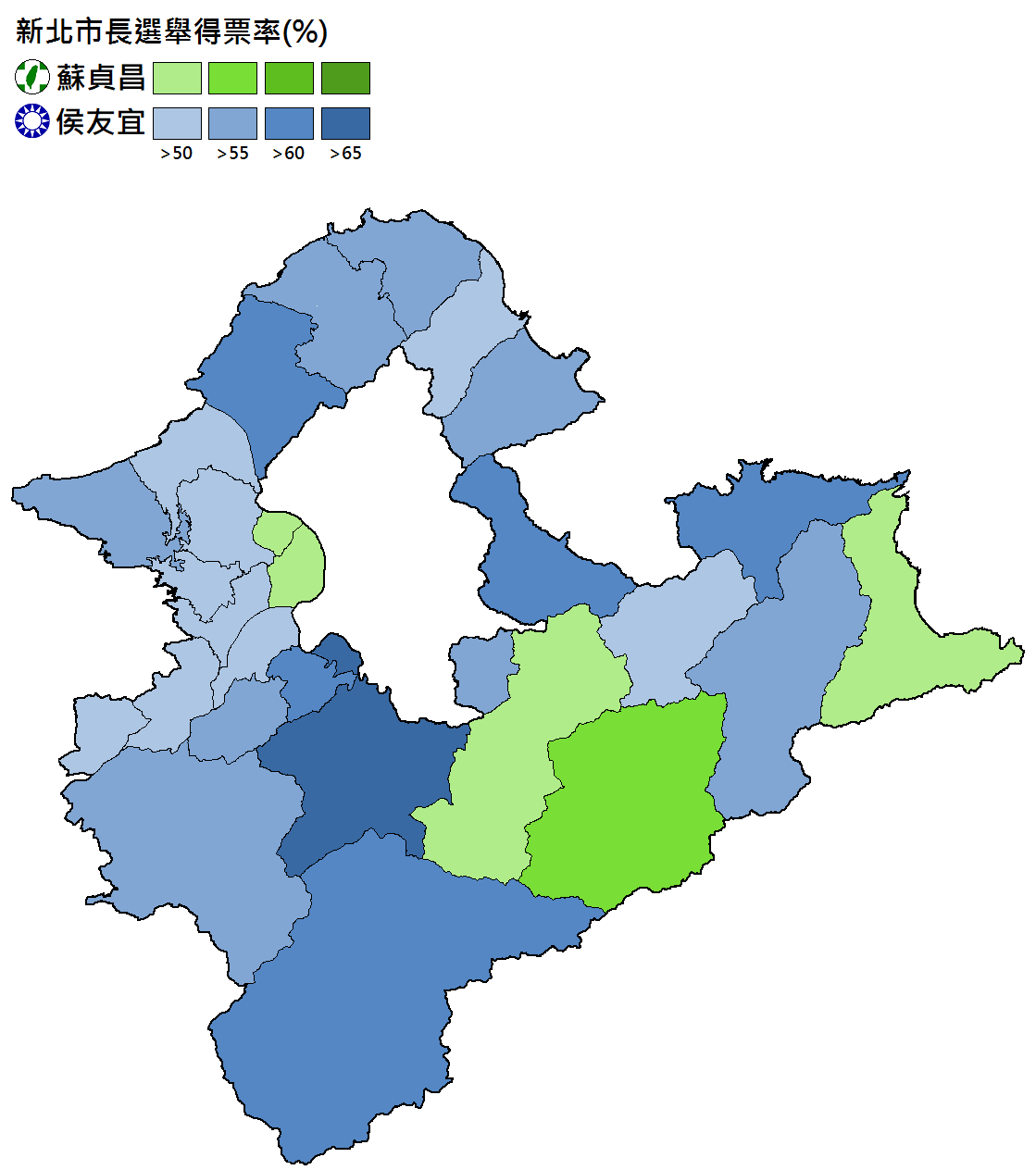
Results of the 2018 New Taipei mayoral election

On 28 February 2018, Hou resigned as deputy mayor of New Taipei City to seek the Kuomintang (KMT) nomination for the 2018 mayoral election. On 6 April, the KMT announced that Hou had won the party's primary against former Taipei County commissioner Chou Hsi-wei and former legislator Ching Chieh-shou. During the campaign, Hou emphasized urban renewal, public safety and transportation infrastructure, proposing a development strategy based on expanding mass transit systems and redeveloping older buildings around their stations.

2018 Kuomintang New Taipei City mayoral primary results
Candidate	Result	Percentage
Hou Yu-ih	Nominated	55.596%
Chou Hsi-wei	2nd	34.210%
Ching Chieh-shou	3rd	10.194%

In the general election held on 24 November 2018, Hou defeated Democratic Progressive Party (DPP) candidate and former premier Su Tseng-chang, receiving 1,165,130 votes, or 57.15% of the valid ballots.

2018 New Taipei City mayoral election results
No.	Candidate	Party	Votes	Percentage
1	Su Tseng-chang	Democratic Progressive Party	873,692	42.85%
2	Hou Yu-ih	Kuomintang	1,165,130	57.15%
Registered voters			3,264,128	
Valid votes			2,038,822	
Invalid votes			50,305	
Voter turnout			64.00%	

==== 2022 ====
On 17 August 2022, Hou confirmed that he would seek reelection as mayor of New Taipei City. During a televised election forum in November, he emphasized his administration's work on transportation infrastructure, urban renewal and redevelopment, while outlining a development strategy extending to 2030. Hou faced former transportation minister Lin Chia-lung of the DPP, who criticized his administration's record on major infrastructure projects. On 26 November, Hou won a second term, defeating Lin with 1,152,555 votes, or 62.42% of the valid ballots.

2022 New Taipei City mayoral election results
No.	Candidate	Party	Votes	Percentage
1	Lin Chia-lung	Democratic Progressive Party	693,976	37.58%
2	Hou Yu-ih	Kuomintang	1,152,555	62.42%
Registered voters			3,316,517	
Valid votes			1,846,531	
Invalid votes			30,655	
Voter turnout			56.60%	

== 2024 presidential election ==
=== Nomination and campaign ===
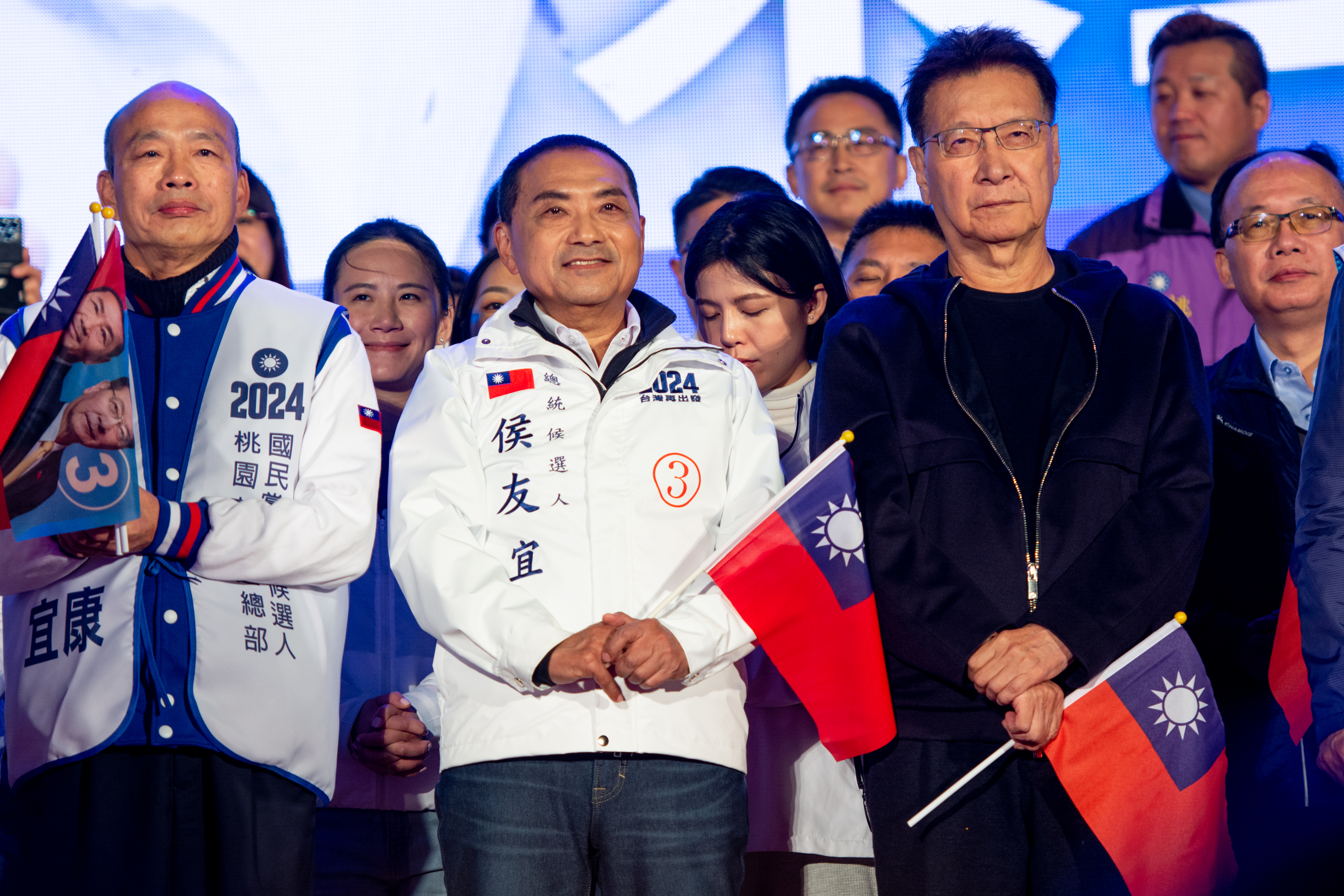
From left to right: Han Kuo-yu, Hou Yu-ih, and Hou's running mate Jaw Shaw-kong at a Kuomintang campaign rally on 6 January 2024

Following his reelection as mayor of New Taipei City in November 2022, Hou emerged as a potential KMT candidate for the 2024 Taiwanese presidential election. On 17 May 2023, KMT chairman Eric Chu announced Hou's selection as the party's presidential nominee, following a recruitment process rather than a formal primary election. Hou had been competing for the nomination with Foxconn founder Terry Gou, who initially pledged to support Hou following the announcement. Despite his popularity as mayor, Hou struggled to gain traction in national opinion polls, with his campaign facing difficulties attracting support from the KMT's traditional voter base. In August 2023, Gou announced that he would enter the presidential election as an independent candidate, reversing his earlier pledge to support Hou and prompting criticism from the KMT leadership.

In September 2023, Hou proposed raising the monthly minimum wage incrementally to NT$33,000 and introducing higher taxes on wealthy individuals as part of his economic platform. Later that month, he undertook an eight-day visit to the United States, meeting American lawmakers, representatives of the American Institute in Taiwan, and foreign-policy specialists at institutions including the Brookings Institution. During the visit, Hou outlined a foreign-policy strategy based on three principles—deterrence, dialogue and de-escalation—intended to strengthen Taiwan's defense capabilities while restoring communication with Beijing and reducing the risk of military confrontation. He also advocated closer security cooperation with the United States, including intelligence sharing and joint military training.

=== Opposition alliance negotiations and election ===
Hou campaigning outside Xinzhuang Baseball Stadium in New Taipei City on 12 January 2024, the day before the presidential election.

As the election approached, Hou and the KMT entered negotiations with the Taiwan People's Party (TPP), led by presidential candidate Ko Wen-je, over the possibility of forming a joint opposition ticket against the ruling Democratic Progressive Party (DPP). On 15 November 2023, following negotiations attended by former president Ma Ying-jeou and KMT chairman Eric Chu, the two parties announced an agreement to determine the order of their presidential and vice-presidential candidates through public opinion polls, with the results scheduled for publication on 18 November. However, the parties failed to reach an agreement on the announced date because of disagreements over which opinion polls should be included and how statistical margins of error should be interpreted. The KMT maintained that its preferred Hou–Ko ticket had prevailed in five of six accepted polls, while the TPP argued that the two possible arrangements had each won three polls under its interpretation of the statistical rules.

Hou's vote share by county and municipality in the 2024 Taiwanese presidential election.

On 23 November, Hou, Ko and Gou attended a final round of negotiations at the Grand Hyatt Taipei, together with Chu and Ma, in an attempt to reach an agreement before the candidate registration deadline. The meeting ended without an agreement after renewed disputes over the interpretation of polling data and the conditions for forming a joint ticket. On 24 November, the KMT selected media personality and former legislator Jaw Shaw-kong as Hou's vice-presidential running mate. Hou and Jaw formally registered their candidacy that day, ending the possibility of a joint KMT–TPP presidential ticket. Gou also withdrew from the election on 24 November, leaving Hou, Ko and DPP candidate Lai Ching-te as the three presidential candidates.

During the final weeks of the campaign, Hou promoted policies intended to make homeownership more affordable for younger Taiwanese, alongside his proposals for higher wages and expanded use of nuclear energy. On 30 December, he participated in the election's only televised presidential debate against Lai and Ko. During the debate, Hou advocated renewed dialogue with China and criticized the DPP's approach to cross-strait relations.

In the presidential election held on 13 January 2024, Hou received 4,671,021 votes (33.49%), finishing second behind Lai, who received 5,586,019 votes (40.05%), while Ko placed third with 3,690,466 votes (26.46%).

2024 Taiwanese presidential election results
No.	Presidential candidate	Vice-presidential candidate	Party	Votes	Percentage
1	Ko Wen-je	Cynthia Wu	Taiwan People's Party	3,690,466	26.46%
2	Lai Ching-te	Hsiao Bi-khim	Democratic Progressive Party	5,586,019	40.05%
3	Hou Yu-ih	Jaw Shaw-kong	Kuomintang	4,671,021	33.49%

== Personal life ==
Hou is married to Jen Mei-ling (任美鈴). The couple had four children: three daughters and one son. Their daughters are Hou Yu-fan (侯昱帆), Hou Ni-chia (侯乃嘉), and Hou Yu-chia (侯又嘉). On 15 May 1992, Hou's only son, Hou Ni-wei (侯乃維), died in a fire aboard a chartered bus carrying children and teachers on a school excursion in Pingzhen, Taoyuan. In total, the disaster killed 23 people, including 20 children.

== Notes ==
Educational offices
Preceded by Hsieh Ing-dan	President of Central Police University; 2008–2010	Succeeded by Hsieh Hsiu-neng
Political offices
Preceded by Eric Chu	Mayor of New Taipei; Acting; 2015–2016	Succeeded by Eric Chu
Preceded by Eric Chu	Mayor of New Taipei; 2018–present	Incumbent
Party political offices
Preceded by Han Kuo-yu	Kuomintang nominee for President of the Republic of China; 2024	Most recent
