= Hsiao Chia-chi =

Taiwanese politician and architect

- 蕭家淇
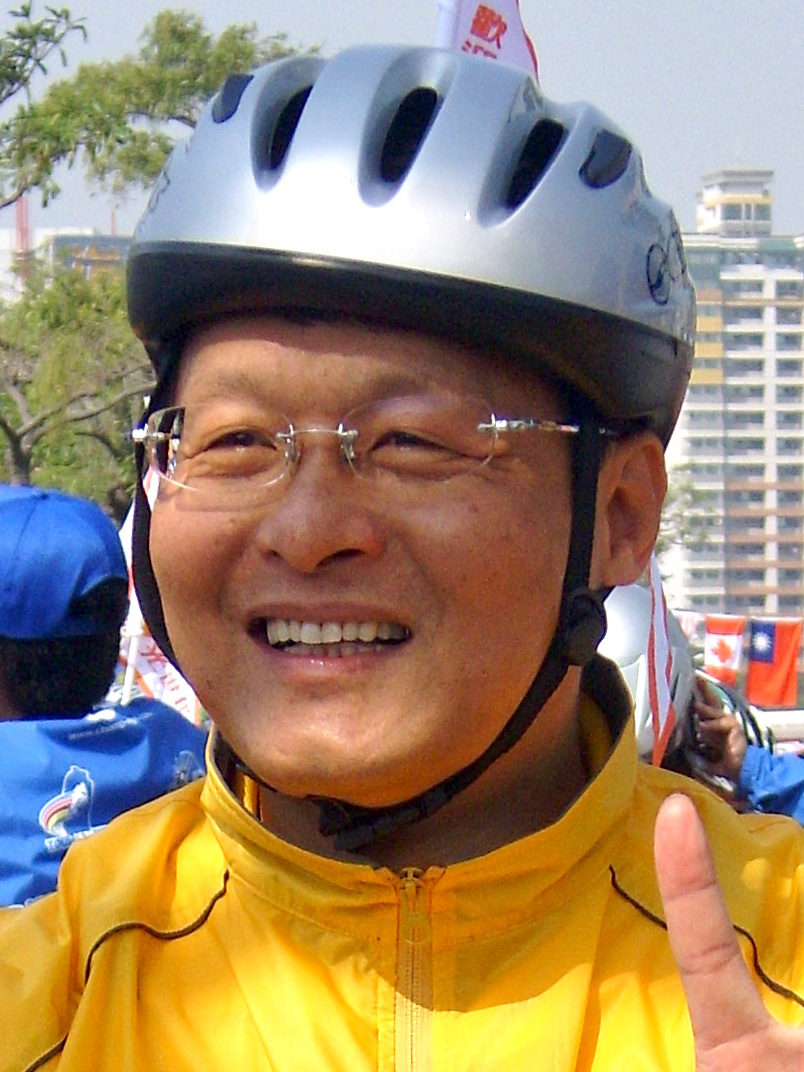
- Hsiao at the 2008 Tour de Taiwan

Deputy Secretary-General of the Executive Yuan
- In office 8 March 2014 – 24 December 2014
- Secretary-General: Lee Shih-chuan
- Preceded by: Chen Ching-tsai

Deputy Minister of the Interior of the Republic of China
- In office 18 February 2013 – 8 March 2014
- Minister: Lee Hong-yuan; Chen Wei-zen
- Preceded by: Chien Tai-lang
- Succeeded by: Chen Chwen-jing

Deputy Mayor of Taichung
- In office December 2002 – 17 February 2013
- Mayor: Jason Hu

Personal details
- Born: 21 June 1961 (age 64) Shuili, Nantou County, Taiwan
- Party: Kuomintang
- Education: National Taiwan University of Science and Technology (BS); National Taiwan University (MS); University of Edinburgh (PhD)

Hsiao Chia-chi (Chinese: 蕭家淇; pinyin: Xiāo Jiāqí; born 21 June 1961) is a Taiwanese architect and politician. He was the Deputy Secretary-General of the Executive Yuan in 2014 and previously served in the Interior Ministry.

== Education ==
After attending Taichung Municipal Taichung Industrial High School, Hsiao graduated from the National Taiwan University of Science and Technology with a bachelor's degree in construction engineering. He then earned a master's degree in architecture and urban planning from National Taiwan University and completed doctoral studies in Scotland at the University of Edinburgh, where he earned his Ph.D. in architecture in 2000 under professors Roger Talbot and Ian Thomson. His doctoral dissertation was titled, "Constructing a sustainable impact assessment methodology: an evaluation of Taiwanese EIA of high-rise buildings".

== Interior Deputy Ministry ==
=== Migration to Northern Taiwan ===
In January 2014, commenting on the recent trend of massive migration of people from Southern to Northern Taiwan over the past six years, Hsiao said that measures will be taken to improve the infrastructure and social welfare, as well as to help young people in the less developed areas. Urban planning will also be reviewed in populated city areas.

== Executive Yuan Deputy Secretary-General ==
=== Sunflower Student Movement ===
In the aftermath of the students occupation of the Executive Yuan in March 2014 during the damage inspection of the Yuan accompanied by Secretary-General Lee Shu-chuan, Hsiao gave a statement which drew criticism from the public for giving more concern of his stolen suncake than the well-being of the wounded protesters. The offended public reacted by giving him back 150 boxes of suncake the next day. Hsiao however did not accept them, noting that in a democratic society it is acceptable for people to voice our their opinion but not to take other people's belonging.
