= Wu Kuo-an =

Taiwanese politician

- 吳國安
- In office February 2012 – May 2012
- Minister: Public Construction Commission
- Succeeded by: Chen Chwen-jing

Wu Kuo-an (Chinese: 吳國安) is a Taiwanese politician.

He was chief secretary of the Public Construction Commission prior to accepting an appointment as deputy minister of the body in February 2012. Wu was succeeded as deputy minister by Chen Chwen-jing in May 2012.
