= Chen Chwen-jing =

Taiwanese civil engineer and academic

- 陳純敬
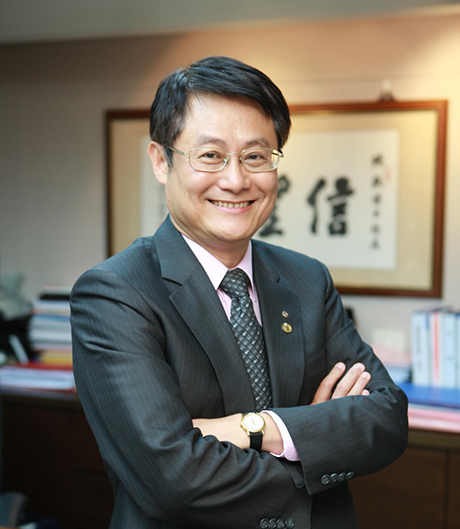

Deputy Minister of the Interior
- In office 8 March 2014 – 20 May 2016
- Minister: Chen Wei-zen
- Preceded by: Hsiao Chia-chi
- Succeeded by: Hua Ching-chun

Political Deputy Minister of Transportation and Communications
- In office 18 February 2013 – 8 March 2014
- Minister: Yeh Kuang-shih
- Preceded by: Yeh Kuang-shih
- Succeeded by: Chen Jian-yu

Deputy Minister of Public Construction Commission of the Executive Yuan
- In office 20 May 2012 – 18 February 2013
- Minister: Chern Jenn-chuan
- Preceded by: Wu Kuo-an

Personal details
- Born: January 2, 1956 (age 70) Kaohsiung, Taiwan
- Education: National Taiwan University (BS); Soochow University (MS); North Carolina State University (MS, PhD)

Chen Chwen-jing (Chinese: 陳純敬; pinyin: Chén Chúnjìng; born January 2, 1956), also known by his English name Jonathan Chen, is a Taiwanese civil engineer and academic. He served as the Deputy Minister of the Interior between March 2014 to May 2016, and previously served in the Ministry of Transportation and Communications from 2013 to 2014.

== Early life and education ==
Chen was born on January 2, 1956, in Kaohsiung. After graduating from Kaohsiung Municipal Kaohsiung Senior High School in 1974, he studied agricultural engineering at National Taiwan University (NTU) and received a Bachelor of Science (B.S.) in 1979. He then completed two years of military service in the Republic of China Army as a second lieutenant platoon commander in the engineering corps and later earned a master's degree from Soochow University.

Upon finishing his military service, Chen worked as a research assistant at the NTU Hydraulic Research Laboratory. In 1982, he went to complete graduate studies in the United States, where he earned a Master of Science (M.S.) in 1983 and his Ph.D. in construction management and civil engineering in 1987 from North Carolina State University. His doctoral dissertation was titled, "Bridge management under a level of service concept providing optimum improvement action, time, and budget prediction," and was completed under professor David W. Johnston.

== Ministry ==
=== Taiwan HSR explosive device discovery incident ===
Commenting on the criticism on the slow evacuation during the discovery of explosive device inside Taiwan High Speed Rail on 12 April 2013, speaking at Legislative Yuan in mid April 2013, Chen responded that the MOTC will review evacuation measures for Taiwan railways systems.

=== Stopover by mainland Chinese in Taiwan ===
In February 2014, speaking at a forum on economic and financial legislation, Chen identified allowing mainland Chinese travelers to transit through Taiwan en route to third destinations as a key issue in cross-strait transportation negotiations following the establishment of the Three Links in 2008. A major obstacle was the mainland Chinese government's requirement that its citizens obtain a Taiwan Travel Permit, even when transiting to another destination.

== Personal life ==
Chen is married to Chen Hsiang-lin, a graduate of Fu Jen Catholic University.
