= Lin Tzu-ling =

Taiwanese politician

- 林慈玲

Administrative Deputy Minister of the Interior of the Republic of China
- Incumbent
- Assumed office 2010
- Minister: Jiang Yi-huah; Lee Hong-yuan; Chen Wei-zen; Yeh Jiunn-rong; Hsu Kuo-yung

Personal details
- Education: National Taiwan University

Lin Tzu-ling (Chinese: 林慈玲; pinyin: Lín Cílíng) is a Taiwanese politician. She currently serves as the Administrative Deputy Minister of the Ministry of the Interior.

== ROC Interior Ministry ==
In 2000, Lin was appointed leader of the Civil Affairs Department. By 2002, she had been named secretary-general of the interior ministry's Sexual Harassment Prevention Council. Lin remained in this position through 2007. In 2009, Lin served as acting director-general of the National Archives Administration.

By 2010, Lin had been appointed deputy minister of the interior. Lin retained her duties at the Ministry of the Interior while serving on the Central Election Commission, to which she was first nominated in 2011.

Speaking at an opening ceremony of a seminar in September 2012 held by National Taiwan Normal University, Lin reiterated ROC sovereignty claim over regions in South China Sea and East China Sea based on ROC geography, history and international law.

In March 2013, Lin presented a report at the Executive Yuan for the project plan to expand sewage system for households in Taiwan. The report stated the increasing number of houses around Taiwan being connected to the sewage system, and that the government will continue to further increase it.
