= New Taipei City Government =

Government of New Taipei City, Taiwan

Coordinates: 25.0122°N 121.4655°E

- 新北市政府

Agency overview
- Formed: 25 December 1945 (as Taipei County Government); 25 December 2010 (as New Taipei City Government)
- Preceding agency: Taipei County Government
- Jurisdiction: New Taipei City
- Headquarters: New Taipei City Hall, Banqiao District
- Minister responsible: Liu Ho-jan, Acting Mayor
- Website: Official website

Chinese name
- Chinese: 新北市政府
Transcriptions
Standard Mandarin
- Hanyu Pinyin: Xīnběi Shìzhèngfǔ
- Bopomofo: ㄒㄧㄣ ㄅㄟˇ ㄕˋ ㄓㄥˋ ㄈㄨˇ
- Wade–Giles: Hsin^{1}-pei^{3} Shih^{4}-cheng^{4}-fu^{3}
- Tongyong Pinyin: Sinběi Shìhjhèngfǔ
- IPA: [ɕín.pèɪ ʂɨ̂.ʈʂə̂ŋ.fù]
Yue: Cantonese
- Yale Romanization: Sānbāk Síhjingfú
- Jyutping: san1 bak1 si5 zing3 fu2
- IPA: [sɐn˥.pɐk̚˥ si˩˧.tsɪŋ˧.fu˧˥]
Southern Min
- Hokkien POJ: Sin-pak Chhī-chèng-hú
Eastern Min
- Fuzhou BUC: Sĭng-báe̤k Chê-céng-hū

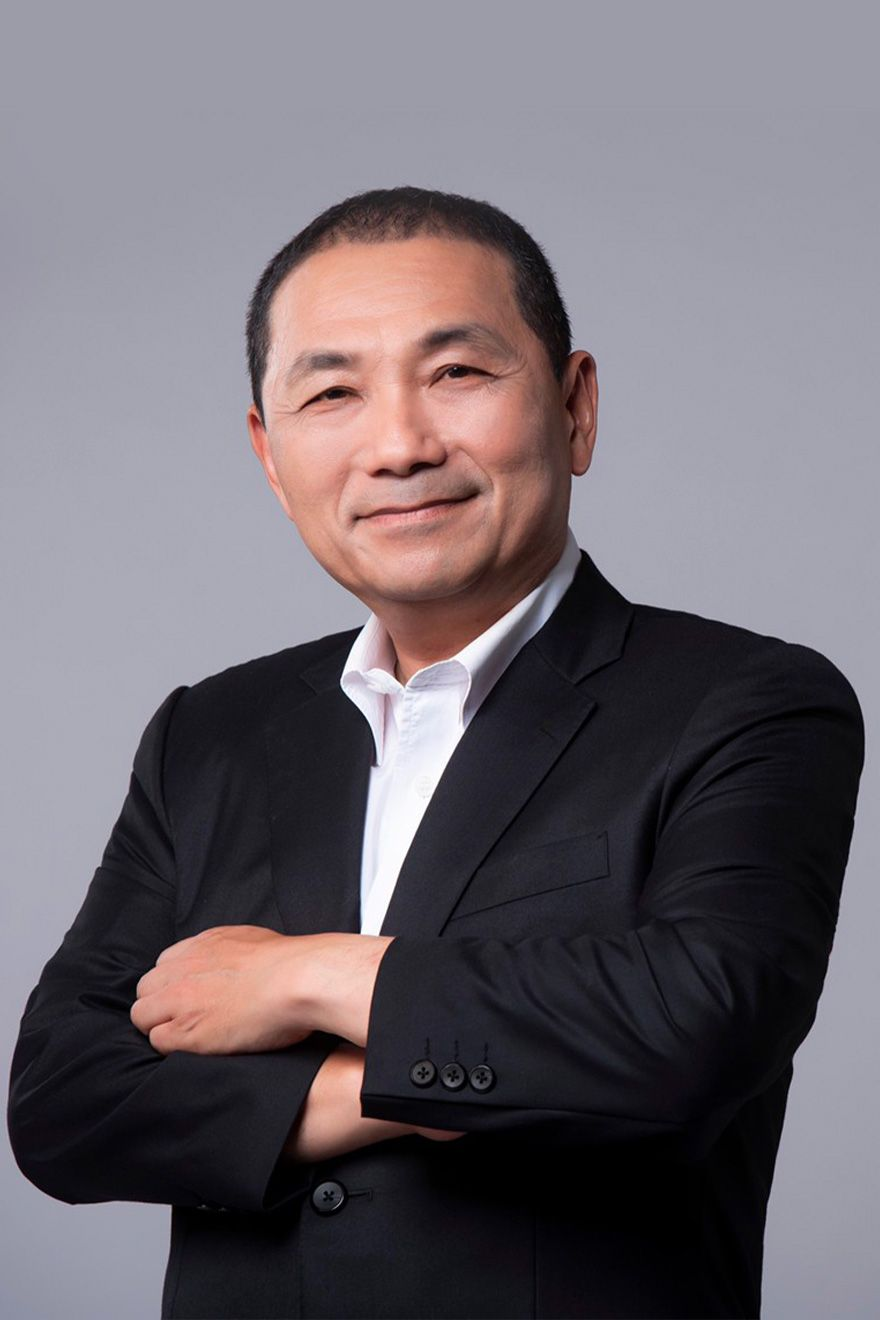
Incumbent mayor Hou Yu-ih

The New Taipei City Government (NTPC; Chinese: 新北市政府; pinyin: Xīnběi Shìzhèngfǔ) is the municipal government of New Taipei City, a special municipality in Taiwan. The New Taipei City Hall is located in Banqiao District.

== History ==
The city government was originally established as Taipei County Government on 25 December 1945, shortly after the handover of Taiwan from Japan to the Republic of China in October 1945 and the Banqiao Township chosen as its county seat in 1947. On 25 December 2010, Taipei County was upgraded to a special municipality as New Taipei City, consisting of 29 districts with Banqiao District as the municipal seat and the county government was renamed New Taipei City Government.

== Organizational structure ==
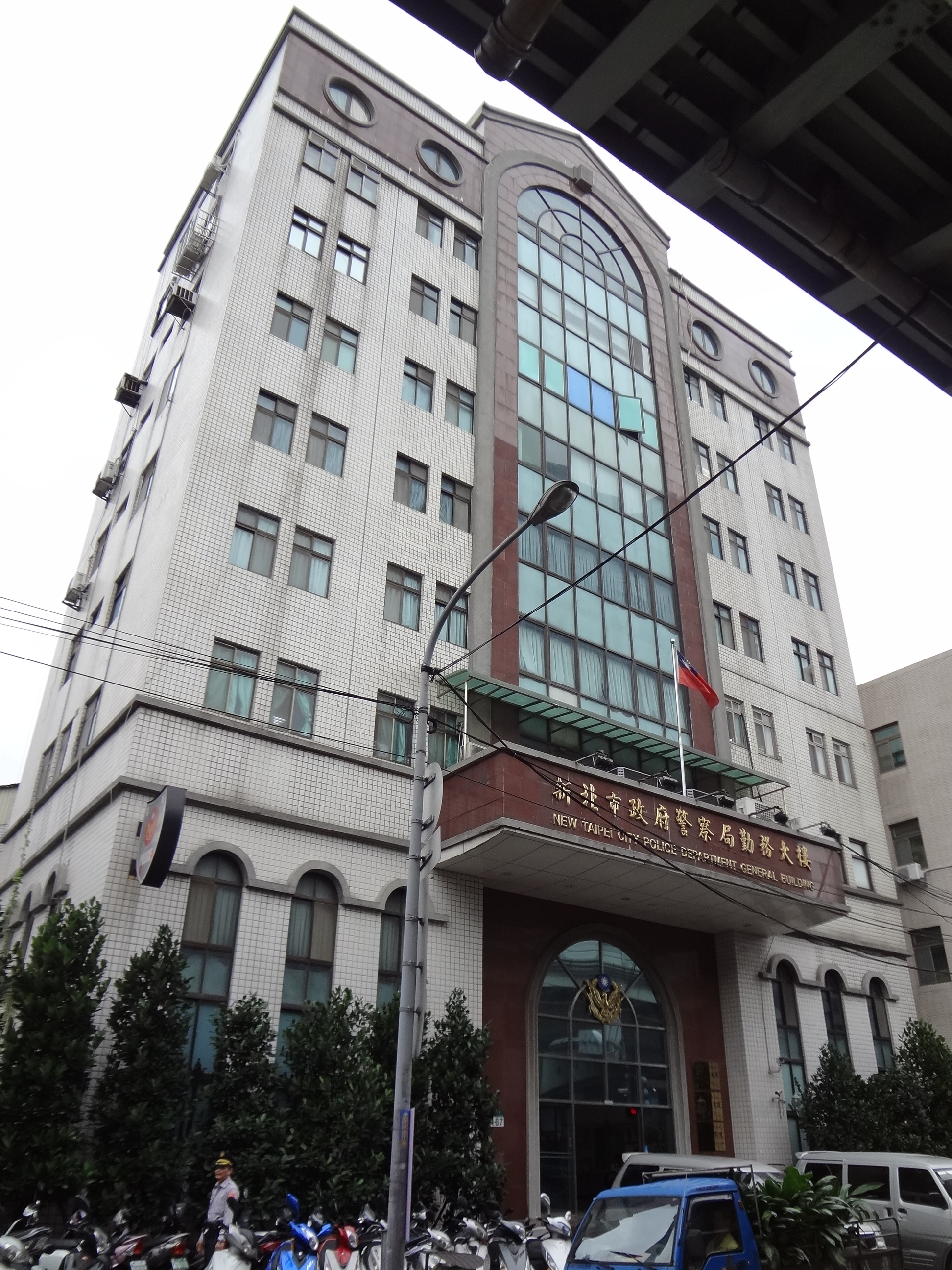
New Taipei City Police Department General Building

=== Operational departments ===
- Education Department
- Civil Affairs Department
- Finance Department
- Labor Affairs Department
- Land Administration Department
- Agriculture Department
- Environmental Protection Department
- Transportation Department
- Urban and Rural Development Department
- Legal Affairs Department
- Social Affairs Department
- Indigenous Peoples Department
- Public Works Department
- Cultural Affairs Department
- Economic Development Department
- Hakka Affairs Department
- Tourism and Travel Department
- Fire Department
- Water Resources Department
- Police Department
- Public Health Department
- Rapid Transit Systems Department
- Information Department

=== Administrative departments ===
- Secretariat
- Information Department
- Budget, Accounting and Statistics Office
- Personnel Office
- Civil Service Ethics Office
- Research, Development and Evaluation Commission

== See also ==
- Mayor of New Taipei
- New Taipei City Hall
- New Taipei City Council
