= Lin Shih-chi =

Taiwanese politician

- 林時機
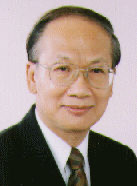

Member of the Control Yuan
- In office 1 February 1999 – 31 January 2005

Member of the Legislative Yuan
- In office 1 February 1987 – 31 January 1990
- Constituency: Taiwan 4th (Yunlin County, Chiayi City, Chiayi County, Tainan County, Tainan City)

Personal details
- Born: 2 August 1939 (age 87)
- Party: Kuomintang
- Education: National Taiwan University (LLB, LLM)

Lin Shih-chi (Chinese: 林時機; born 2 August 1939) is a Taiwanese politician who served on the Legislative Yuan from 1987 to 1990, and the Control Yuan from 1999 to 2005.

== Education and early career ==
After earning a bachelor's and master's degree in law from National Taiwan University, Lin worked as a lawyer and served as the president of the China Times.

== Political career ==
Lin was a member of the Legislative Yuan between 1987 and 1990. In 1999, he was appointed to the Control Yuan, stepping down in 2005.

As a member of the Control Yuan, Lin was active in a task force called to investigate James Soong's finances shortly before the 2000 presidential election, in which Soong was a candidate. In August 2000, Lin helped impeach education minister Ovid Tzeng, giving several public statements on the case, which found that Tzeng was a dual citizen of Taiwan and the United States while working at public universities in Taiwan. During Lin's tenure on the Control Yuan, he began a long investigation into the 1992 purchase of Dassault Mirage 2000 jet fighters from France. In 2001, Lin probed the cancellation of the Lungmen Nuclear Power Plant construction that had occurred the previous year. Other investigations into the environment and public safety have led to censure of the Environmental Protection Administration in 2001, and three other government agencies in 2002, for inadequate responses to drought conditions the island faced that year. In September, Lin, Lee Shen-yi, and Chao Ron-yaw censured the Executive Yuan, which was found to have sent 40 percent of Taiwan's total foreign investment to China, leading to economic recession and increasing unemployment. The next month, Lin found that miscommunication between the National Immigration Agency and the Ministry of National Defense made the defection of Republic of China Army Lieutenant Wang Yi-hung possible, and issued censures to both agencies. In 2003, Lin issued a decision on the Ministry of Finance's attempt to repossess government property that was being occupied illegally, censuring the ministry for following outdated regulations, which in turn caused the repossession process to be inefficient. Later that year, Lin initiated an investigation into Taipei mayor Ma Ying-jeou's relationship with Fubon Financial Holding Co. Lin brought Ma in for questioning again in 2004, this time over the use of public billboards in support of Taipei City Government spokesman Wu Yu-sheng's 2004 legislative bid. The Kuomintang nominated Lin for a second term on the Control Yuan in 2007, but he was not selected.

== Personal life ==
Lin's son Lin Feng-cheng became the second chairman of the Ill-gotten Party Assets Settlement Committee in September 2017. Lin's nephew Lin Hui-huang is a judge.
