= Chou Hsi-wei =

Taiwanese politician

- 周錫瑋
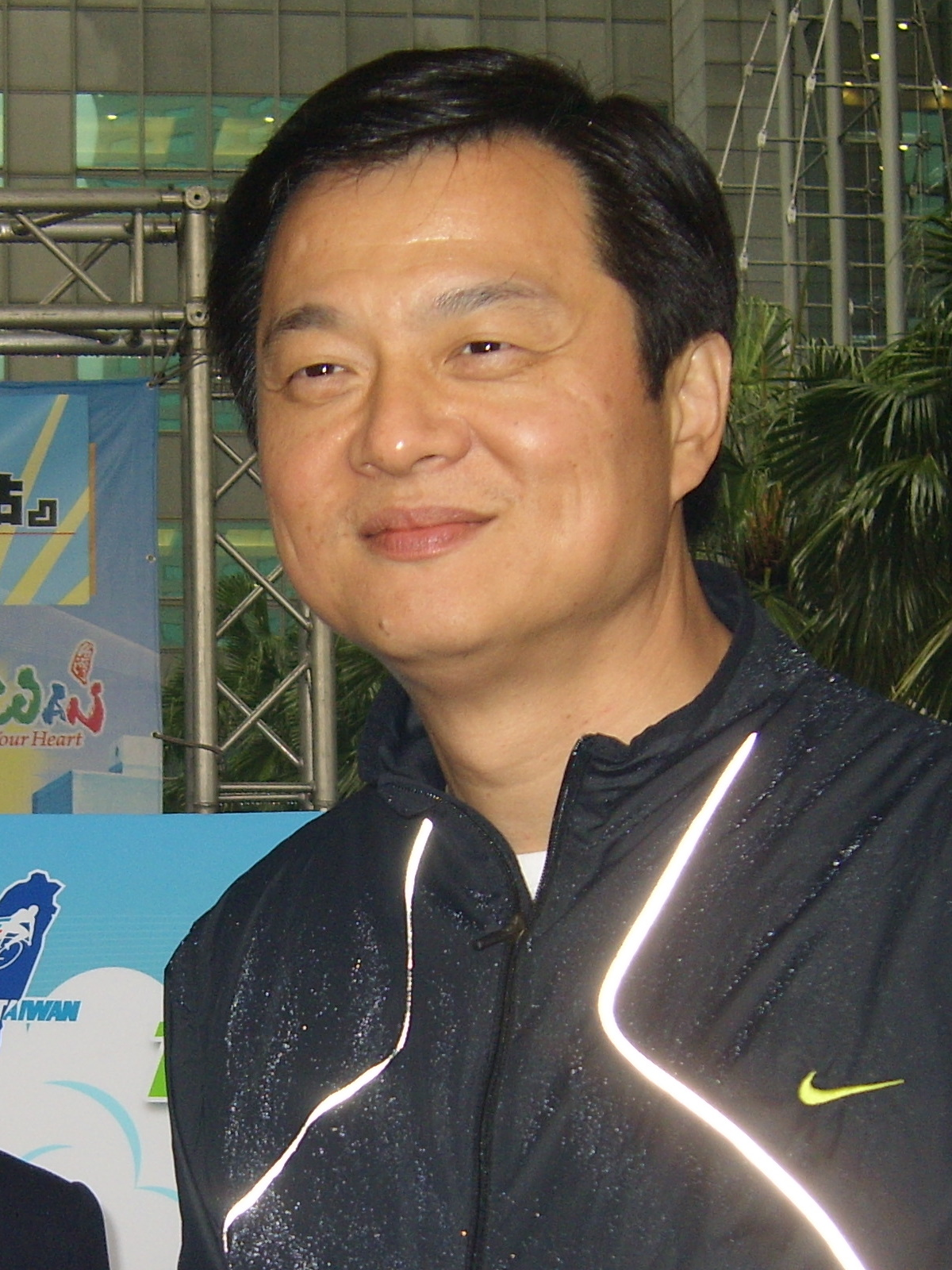
- Chou at the 2008 Tour de Taiwan press conference

Magistrate of Taipei County
- In office 20 December 2005 – 25 December 2010
- Deputy: Lee Shu-chuan; Lee Hong-yuan; Tsai Chia-fu
- Preceded by: Su Tseng-chang; Lin Hsi-yao (acting)
- Succeeded by: Office abolished, with Eric Chu as Mayor of New Taipei

Member of the Legislative Yuan
- In office 1 February 1999 – 31 January 2005
- Constituency: Taipei County 1

Personal details
- Born: 11 March 1958 (age 68) Changhua County, Taiwan
- Party: Kuomintang
- Other political affiliations: People First Party
- Education: Fu Jen Catholic University (BA); University of Southern California (MPA, MBA)

Chou Hsi-wei (Chinese: 周錫瑋; pinyin: Zhōu Xíwěi; Wade–Giles: Chou^{1} Hsi^{2}-wei^{3}, born 11 March 1958) is a Taiwanese politician. He was a member of the Legislative Yuan from 1999 to 2005. He then served as Taipei County Magistrate from 2005 to 2010.

Chou worked for James Soong and was a member of Soong's People First Party until joining the Kuomintang in 2005.

== Education ==
Chou graduated with his bachelor's degree in business administration from Fu Jen Catholic University, then earned a Master of Business Administration (M.B.A.) and a Master of Public Administration (M.P.A.) from the University of Southern California in the United States.

== Political career ==
Chou served two terms on the Legislative Yuan before he was elected as the Magistrate of Taipei County in the 2005 Republic of China local election held on 3 December 2005 and took office on 20 December 2005. In October 2017, Chou declared his candidacy for the New Taipei mayoralty. He registered for the Kuomintang mayoral primary in March 2018. In February 2019, Chou announced his bid for the 2020 Kuomintang presidential nomination.

2019 Kuomintang Republic of China presidential primary results
Candidates	Place	Result
Han Kuo-yu	Nominated	44.81%
Terry Gou	2nd	27.73%
Eric Chu	3rd	17.90%
Chou Hsi-wei	4th	6.02%
Chang Ya-chung	5th	3.54%
