= Criminal Investigation Bureau =

Police agency of Taiwan

- 刑事警察局
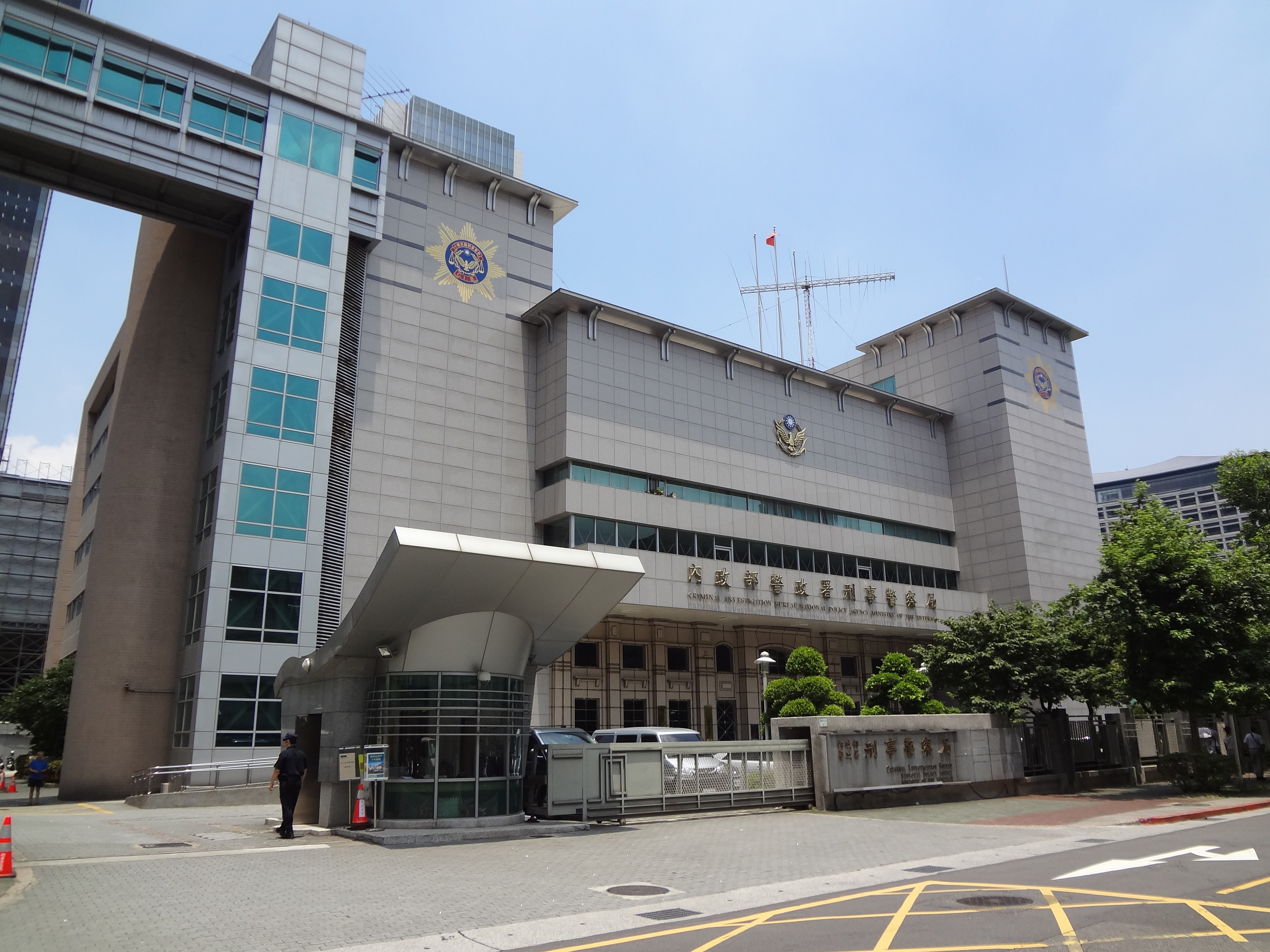

Agency overview
- Formed: 1 September 1973
- Preceding agency: Criminal Affairs Division
- Jurisdiction: Taiwan
- Headquarters: Xinyi, Taipei, Taiwan; 25°02′33.3″N 121°33′44.2″E
- Agency executive: Huang Chia-lu, Commissioner
- Parent agency: National Police Agency
- Website: Official website

The Criminal Investigation Bureau (CIB; Chinese: 刑事警察局; pinyin: Xíngshì Jǐngchájú) is a unit of National Police Agency under the Ministry of the Interior of Taiwan.

== History ==
The modern criminal police system of the Republic of China was originally established in 1946 when the National Police Department (NPD) was established under the jurisdiction of the Ministry of the Interior. It consisted of a Criminal Affairs Division and Crime Laboratory, as well as Criminal Sections for each province.

In 1945, Taiwan was handed over from Japan to the Republic of China. Soon afterwards, the Taiwan Provincial Police Administration (TPPA) was established under the jurisdiction of Taiwan Provincial Administration Office. TPPA consisted of an Investigation Unit under its First Section and a Forensic Science Unit under its Third Section. The two units were integrated with the Research Unit to form the Criminal Affairs Office. In 1946, NPD was upgraded to the National Police Service (NPS). On 16 May 1947, Taiwan Provincial Government was established and TPPA took over the task of police affairs in Taiwan. In 1949 after the government retreat from Nanking to Taipei, NPS was downgraded to NPD. On 15 July 1972, NPD was reorganized as the National Police Agency (NPA).

On 1 September 1973, the Criminal Investigation Bureau was established by the government and placed it under the jurisdiction of NPA. On 28 March 1974, CIB took over the duties of National Central Bureau Taipei (NCB Taipei) to liaise with Interpol. In 1998, the Taiwan Provincial Police Administration Criminal Police Corps was dissolved and its personnel and responsibilities were merged into CIB.

== Organizational structure ==
As of 2025, the CIB is organized in the following:

- Commissioner
- Deputy Commissioners
- Crime Investigation Affairs Division
- Crime Prevention Affairs Division
- Anti-Organized Crime Division
- Legal Affairs Division
- Criminal Records Division
- International Criminal Affairs Divisions
- Cross-Strait Affairs Division
- Economic Crimes Division
- Forensic Examination Division
- Fingerprint Division
- Forensic Biology Division
- Research and Development Division
- Criminal Information Division
- Electronic Surveillance Division
- Crime Prevention and Detection Commanding Center
- Public Relations Office
- Secretarial Office
- Logistic Service Division
- Personnel Office
- Accounting Office
- Government Ethics Office
- Internal Affairs and Training Division
- 1st Investigation Corp
- 2nd Investigation Corp
- 3rd Investigation Corp
- 4th Investigation Corp
- 5th Investigation Corp
- 6th Investigation Corp
- 7th Investigation Corp
- 8th Investigation Corp
- 9th Investigation Corp
- Telecommunications Investigation Corp
- Special Tactical Unit

== Commissioners ==
- Liu Po-liang
- Huang Ming-chao
- Huang Chia-lu

== Transportation ==
The bureau is accessible within walking distance north west from Taipei City Hall Station of the Taipei Metro.
