= Mayor of New Taipei =

Political executive in Taiwan

Mayor of the City of New Taipei
- Flag of the Mayor

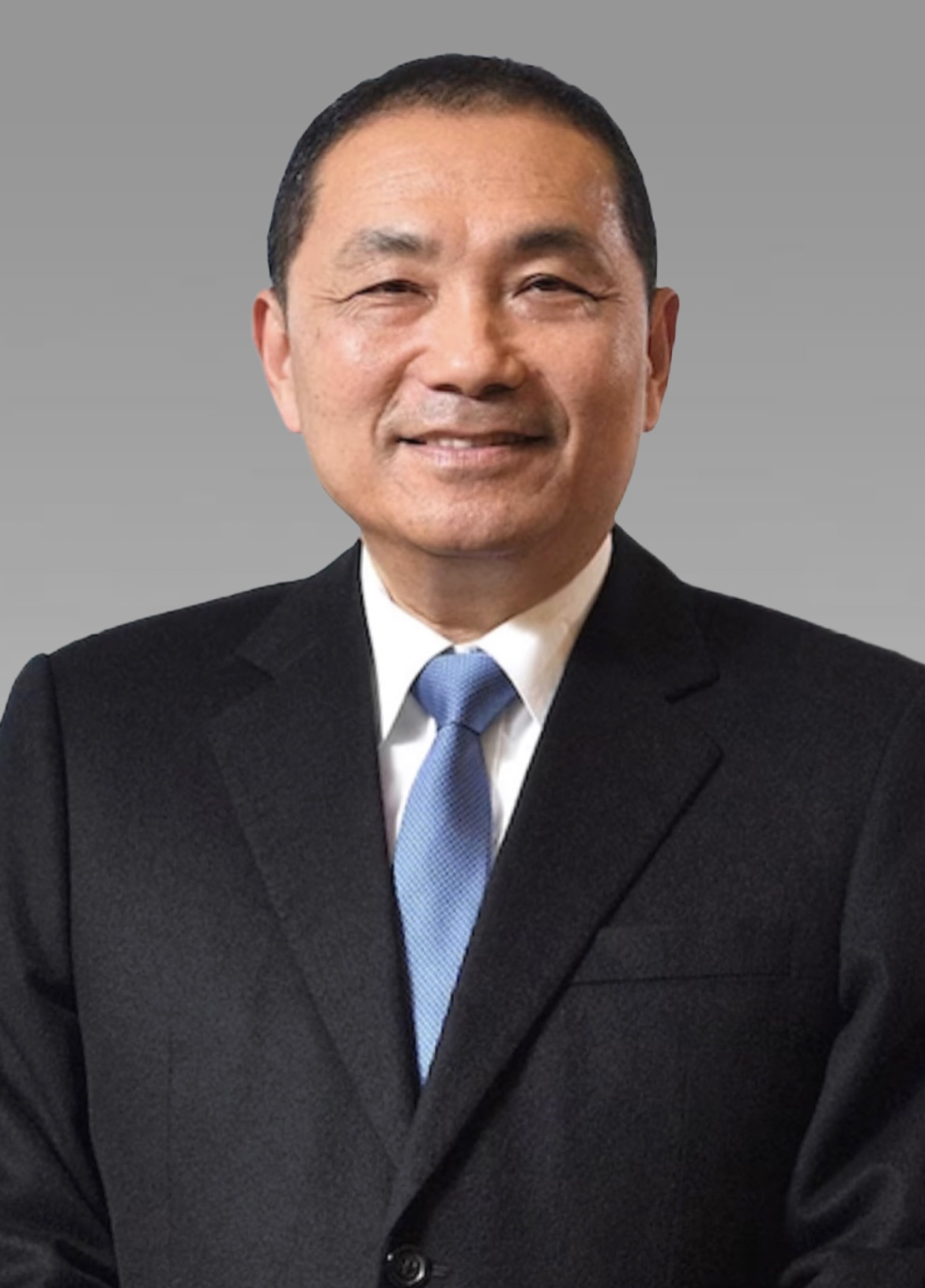
- Incumbent; Hou Yu-ih since 14 January 2024
- Term length: 4 years; may serve 1 consecutive terms
- Inaugural holder: Eric Chu
- Formation: 25 December 2010
- Website: www.ntpc.gov.tw

The Mayor of New Taipei is the chief political executive of the city of New Taipei in Taiwan. The mayor, a new position created when the predecessor entity of New Taipei, Taipei County, was elevated to a special municipality in 2010, is elected to a four-year term. The equivalent position in the former county was Taipei County Magistrate. The incumbent mayor is Hou Yu-ih, who returned to office on 14 January 2024 after a temporary leave of absence for the 2024 Taiwanese presidential election as the Kuomintang nominee.

== Titles of the Mayor ==
Date	English	Characters	Mandarin	Taiwanese	Hakka
Oct 1950–Dec 2014	Magistrate of Taipei County	臺北縣縣長	Táiběi Xiàn Xiànzhǎng	Tâi-pak-koān Koān-tiúⁿ	Thòi-pet-yen Yen-chhòng
Dec 2014–present	Mayor of New Taipei City	新北市市長	Xīnběi Shì Shìzhǎng	Sin-pak-chhī Chhī-tiúⁿ	Sîn-pet-sṳ Sṳ-chhòng

== List of mayors ==
Kuomintang (KMT) Democratic Progressive Party (DPP)

=== Taipei County Magistrate ===
No.	Portrait	Name (Birth–Death)	Term of office		Political party	Term
1		Mei Ta-fu 梅達夫; Méi Dáfū (Mandarin); Mòi Tha̍t-fû (Hakka) (1900–1980)	1 May 1951	2 June 1954	Kuomintang	1
2		Tai Te-fa 戴德發; Dài Défā (Mandarin); Tai Tet-fat (Hakka) (1903–1998)	2 June 1954	2 June 1957	Kuomintang	2
2		Tai Te-fa 戴德發; Dài Défā (Mandarin); Tai Tet-fat (Hakka) (1903–1998)	2 June 1957	2 June 1960	Kuomintang	3
3		Hsieh Wen-cheng 謝文程; Xiè Wénchéng (Mandarin); Chhia Vùn-chhàng (Hakka) (1886–1963)	2 June 1960	31 October 1963 (Note: Term extended to 4 years.) (Note: Died in office.)	Kuomintang	4
--		Lee Wen-yu (Note: As acting; secretary general of the county government.) 李文玉; Lǐ Wényù (Mandarin); Lí Vùn-ngiu̍k (Hakka) (1910–1998)	31 October 1963	2 June 1964	Kuomintang	4
4		Su Ching-po 蘇清波; Sū Qīngbō (Mandarin); Sû Chhîn-pô (Hakka) (1911–1990)	2 June 1964	2 June 1968	Kuomintang	5
4		Su Ching-po 蘇清波; Sū Qīngbō (Mandarin); Sû Chhîn-pô (Hakka) (1911–1990)	2 June 1968	1 July 1969 (Note: Suspended due to corruption charges.)	Kuomintang	6
--		Lee Wen-yu 李文玉; Lǐ Wényù (Mandarin); Lí Vùn-ngiu̍k (Hakka) (1910–1998)	1 July 1969	1 May 1970	Kuomintang	6
--		Su Ching-po (Note: Found not guilty; reinstated.) 蘇清波; Sū Qīngbō (Mandarin); Sû Chhîn-pô (Hakka) (1910–1998)	1 May 1970	1 February 1973 (Note: Term extended to accommodate joint elections.)	Kuomintang	6
5		Shao En-hsin 邵恩新; Shaò Ēnxīn (Mandarin); Seu Ên-sîn (Hakka) (1924–2014)	1 February 1973	20 December 1977	Kuomintang	7
5		Shao En-hsin 邵恩新; Shaò Ēnxīn (Mandarin); Seu Ên-sîn (Hakka) (1924–2014)	20 December 1977	14 September 1981 (Note: Left office to serve as Taiwan Province Civil Affairs Department Commissioner.)	Kuomintang	8
--		Wu Tseng-wen (Note: As acting; provincial council member.) 武增文; Wǔ Zēngwén (Mandarin); Vú Chen-vùn (Hakka) (1919–1987)	14 September 1981	20 December 1981	Kuomintang	8
6		Lin Fong-cheng 林豐正; Lín Fēngzhèng (Mandarin); Lìm Fûng-chṳn (Hakka) (1940–)	20 December 1981	20 December 1985	Kuomintang	9
6		Lin Fong-cheng 林豐正; Lín Fēngzhèng (Mandarin); Lìm Fûng-chṳn (Hakka) (1940–)	20 December 1985	20 December 1989	Kuomintang	10
7		You Ching 尤清; Yóu Qīng (Mandarin); Yù Chhîn (Hakka) (1942–)	20 December 1989	20 December 1993	Democratic Progressive Party	11
7		You Ching 尤清; Yóu Qīng (Mandarin); Yù Chhîn (Hakka) (1942–)	20 December 1993	20 December 1997	Democratic Progressive Party	12
8		Su Tseng-chang 蘇貞昌; Sū Zhēnchāng (Mandarin); Sû Chṳ̂n-chhông (Hakka) (1947–)	20 December 1997	20 December 2001	Democratic Progressive Party	13
8		Su Tseng-chang 蘇貞昌; Sū Zhēnchāng (Mandarin); Sû Chṳ̂n-chhông (Hakka) (1947–)	20 December 2001	20 May 2004 (Note: Left office to serve as Secretary General of the Office of the President.)	Democratic Progressive Party	14
—		Lin Hsi-yao (Note: As acting; designated by Executive Yuan) 林錫耀; Lín Xíyào (Mandarin); Lìm Siak-yeu (Hakka) (1961–)	20 May 2004	20 December 2005	Democratic Progressive Party	14
9		Chou Hsi-wei 周錫瑋; Zhōu Xíwěi (Mandarin); Chû Siak-ví (Hakka) (1958–)	20 December 2005	25 December 2010	Kuomintang	15

=== Mayor of New Taipei ===
No.	Portrait	Name (Birth–Death)	Term of office		Political party	Term
1		Eric Chu 朱立倫; Zhū Lìlún (Mandarin); Chû Li̍p-lùn (Hakka) (1961–)	25 December 2010	25 December 2014	Kuomintang	1
1		Eric Chu 朱立倫; Zhū Lìlún (Mandarin); Chû Li̍p-lùn (Hakka) (1961–)	25 December 2014	20 October 2015 (Note: On leave to run for President.)	Kuomintang	2
–		Hou Yu-ih (Note: As acting; deputy mayor.) 侯友宜; Hóu Yŏuyí (Mandarin); Hèu Yû-ngì (Hakka) (1956–)	20 October 2015	18 January 2016	Kuomintang	2
1		Eric Chu 朱立倫; Zhū Lìlún (Mandarin); Chû Li̍p-lùn (Hakka) (1961–)	18 January 2016	25 December 2018	Kuomintang	2
2		Hou Yu-ih 侯友宜; Hóu Yŏuyí (Mandarin); Hèu Yû-ngì (Hakka) (1956–)	25 December 2018	25 December 2022	Kuomintang	3
2		Hou Yu-ih 侯友宜; Hóu Yŏuyí (Mandarin); Hèu Yû-ngì (Hakka) (1956–)	25 December 2022	23 September 2023	Kuomintang	4
–		Liu Ho-jan 劉和然; Liú Hérán (Mandarin) (1966–)	23 September 2023	14 January 2024		4
2		Hou Yu-ih 侯友宜; Hóu Yŏuyí (Mandarin); Hèu Yû-ngì (Hakka) (1956–)	14 January 2024	Incumbent	Kuomintang	4

== See also ==
- New Taipei City
- New Taipei City Government
  - New Taipei City Hall
- New Taipei City Council
