= Bing-Jean Lee =

- 李秉乾

President of Feng Chia University
- In office 2013–2022

Personal details
- Education: National Cheng Kung University (BS); National Taiwan University (MS); University of Texas at Austin (PhD)

Bing-Jean Lee is a Taiwanese civil engineer. He was the president of Feng Chia University from 2013 to 2022.

== Early life and education ==
Born in Taiwan, Lee graduated from National Cheng Kung University with a bachelor's degree in civil engineering in 1982. He then earned a master's degree in civil engineering from National Taiwan University in 1984 and earned his Ph.D. in aerospace and engineering mechanics from the University of Texas at Austin in 1991.

== Career ==
After his Ph.D., he was a postdoc at M.I.T. and UC San Diego. In 1994, he returned to Taiwan to join Feng Chia University (FCU), Taichung City, Taiwan as a faculty member. He then held several leadership posts at FCU: as department chairman, dean of college, and vice president of the university. Since 2013, he has been President of FCU. He has published work related to structural engineering, and disaster mitigation,

== Awards ==
In 2018, he received the outstanding university president award from the Taiwan Culture and Education Association.
