= Tseng Ming-chung =

Taiwanese politician and banker

Tseng Ming-chung MLY
- 曾銘宗
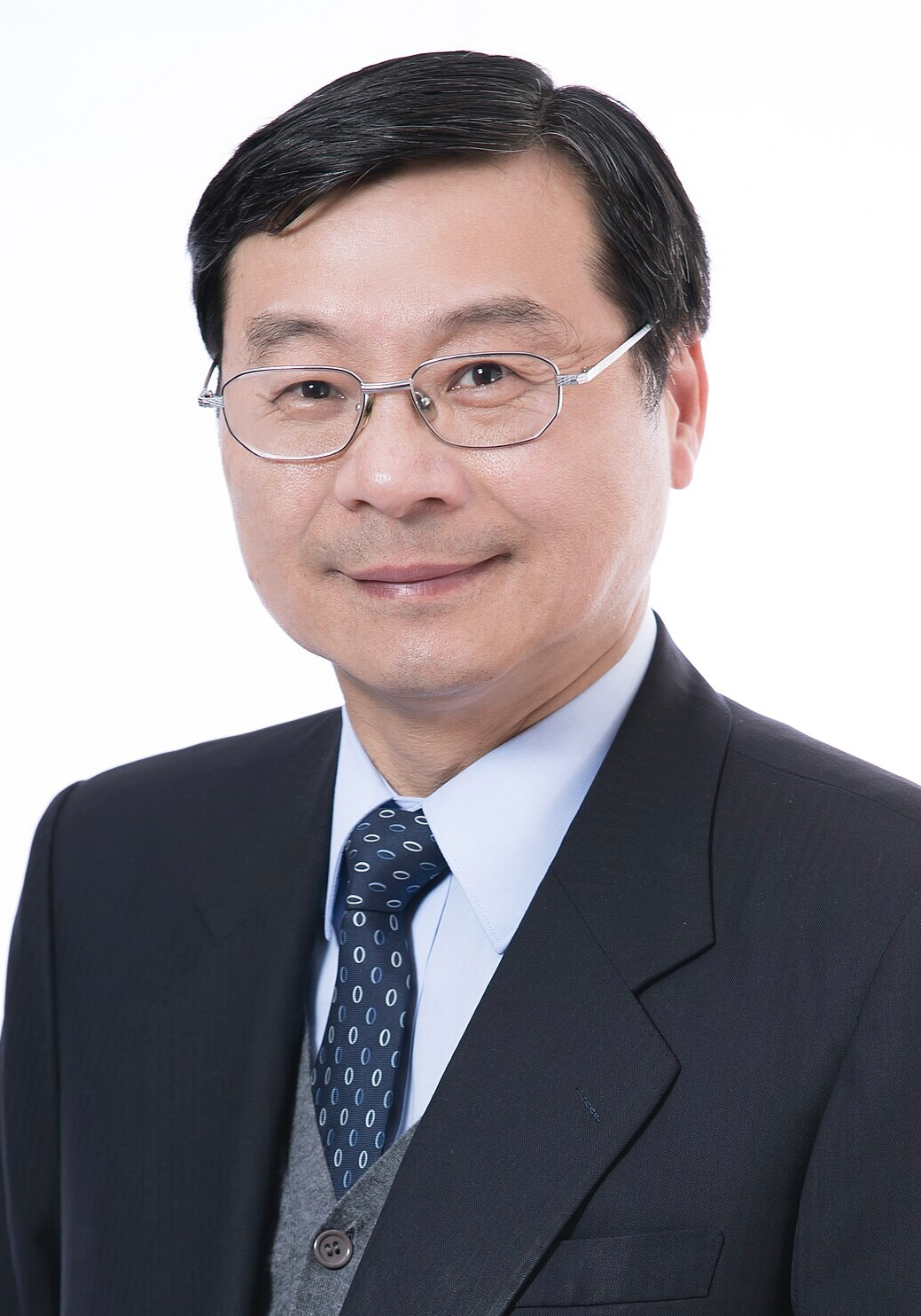
- Official portrait, 2016

Minority Leader of the Legislative Yuan
- In office 10 February 2022 – 31 January 2024
- Speaker: Yu Shyi-kun
- Secretary General: See list: Wan Mei-ling Lee De-wei Hsieh Yi-fong
- Preceded by: Alex Fai
- Succeeded by: Ker Chien-ming

Member of the Legislative Yuan
- In office 1 February 2016 – 31 January 2024
- Constituency: Party-list

Acting Secretary-General of the Kuomintang
- In office 15 January 2020 – 18 March 2020
- Chairman: Lin Rong-te (acting); Johnny Chiang
- Preceded by: Tseng Yung-chuan
- Succeeded by: Lee Chien-lung

7th Chairman of the Financial Supervisory Commission
- In office 1 August 2013 – 31 January 2016
- Prime Minister: Jiang Yi-huah; Mao Chi-kuo
- Deputy: Wang Li-ling, Huang Tien-mu
- Preceded by: Chen Yuh-chang
- Succeeded by: Wang Li-ling

Political Deputy Minister of Finance
- In office 2012 – July 2013
- Minister: Chang Sheng-ford
- Succeeded by: Wu Tang-chieh

Administrative Deputy Minister of Finance
- In office 2008–2012
- Minister: Lee Sush-der; Christina Liu

Personal details
- Born: 22 January 1959 (age 67) Xikou, Chiayi, Taiwan
- Party: Kuomintang (since 2016)
- Education: National Chung Hsing University (BA, MPP); National Taipei University (PhD)

Tseng Ming-chung (Chinese: 曾銘宗; pinyin: Zēng Míngzōng; born 22 January 1959), also known by his English name William Tseng, is a Taiwanese politician and banker. He has served as Deputy Minister of Finance, chaired the Financial Supervisory Commission, and as an elected member of the Legislative Yuan.

== Education ==
Tseng graduated from National Chung Hsing University with a bachelor's degree in finance and taxation and earned a Master of Public Policy (M.P.P.) from the university's College of Law and Commerce, writing his master's thesis on "Tax incentives and foreign investment" (Chinese: 租稅獎勵政策與外人投資). He then earned his Ph.D. in business administration from National Taipei University in 2013. His doctoral dissertation was titled, "A study on the relationship between government debt and economic growth in Taiwan" (我國債務水準與經濟成長之關係研究).

== Political career ==
As deputy minister of finance, Tseng commented on the amendment to raise the tax and health and welfare surcharge on tobacco in early May 2013. He stated that the move would result in a loss of NT$610 million in tax revenue but it will bring in an extra NT$25 billion in income used for health and welfare funds.

He was named the Chairperson of the Financial Supervisory Commission of the Executive Yuan on 1 August 2013.

Tseng was elected to the Legislative Yuan through the proportional representation ballot in 2016, as a member of the Kuomintang. Prior to the election, he was an independent.

Party political offices
Preceded by Tseng Yung-chuan	Secretary-General of the Kuomintang (Acting); 2020	Succeeded by Lee Chien-lung
