= Lee Chien-lung =

Taiwanese politician

- 李乾龍

25th & 27th Secretary-General of the Kuomintang
- Incumbent
- Assumed office 1 November 2025
- Chairman: Cheng Li-wun
- Deputy: See list: Lee Che-hua Wan Mei-ling
- Preceded by: Justin Huang
- In office 18 March 2020 – 30 October 2021
- Chairman: Johnny Chiang
- Deputy: See list: Lee Yen-hsiu (Full time) Ko Chih-en Hsieh Lung-jie Yen Kuan-heng Kwei-Bo Huang
- Preceded by: Tseng Ming-chung (a.i.)
- Succeeded by: Justin Huang
Additional offices
Chairman of the KMT New Taipei City Chapter
In office 15 October 2017 – 8 March 2020
Chairman	Wu Den-yih; Lin Rong-te (a.i.)
Commissioner of the New Taipei City Department of Civil Affairs
In office 25 December 2010 – 24 June 2011
Mayor	Eric Chu
Preceded by	Position established
Succeeded by	Chen Chia-hsin
Mayor of Sanchong, Taipei County
In office 1 March 2002 – 25 December 2010
Preceded by	Chu Ching-fa
Succeeded by	Position abolished

Personal details
- Born: 4 September 1949 (age 76) Hualien City, Taipei County, Taiwan, Republic of China
- Party: Kuomintang
- Education: Feng Chia University (BS); Fu Jen Catholic University (MBA)

Lee Chien-lung (Chinese: 李乾龍) is a Taiwanese politician from New Taipei City and a member of the Kuomintang (KMT). He is the current Secretary-General of Kuomintang serving under Chairman Cheng Li-wun. Lee previously served as the Chairman of the KMT New Taipei City Chapter, Commissioner of the New Taipei City Department of Civil Affairs, and Mayor of Sanchong City, Taipei County. Lee ran unsuccessfully for a New Taipei City seat in the Legislative Yuan during both the 2012 and 2016 Taiwanese legislative election.

Party political offices
Preceded by Tseng Ming-chung (Acting)	Secretary-General of the Kuomintang; 2020–2021	Succeeded by Justin Huang
