= King Pu-tsung =

Taiwanese politician (born 1956)

- 金溥聰
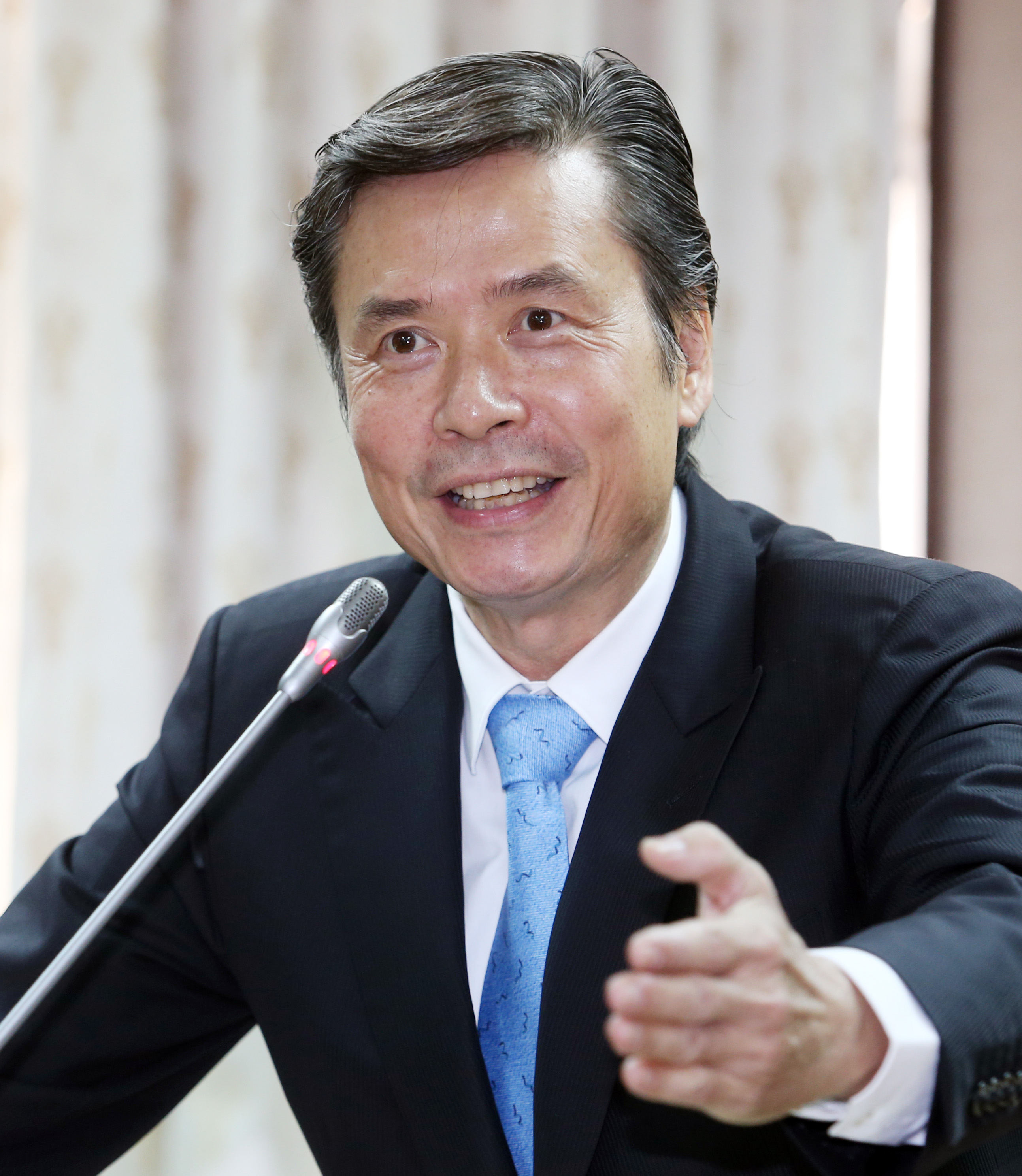
- King in 2014

Secretary-General of the National Security Council
- In office 25 March 2014 – 12 February 2015
- Chairman: Ma Ying-jeou
- Preceded by: Jason Yuan
- Succeeded by: Kao Hua-chu

Taiwanese Representative to the United States
- In office 27 September 2012 – 24 March 2014
- Deputy: Leo Lee
- Preceded by: Jason Yuan
- Succeeded by: Shen Lyu-shun

Secretary-General of the Kuomintang
- In office 17 December 2009 – 18 January 2011
- Chairman: Ma Ying-jeou
- Preceded by: Chan Chun-po
- Succeeded by: Liao Liou-yi

Deputy Mayor of Taipei
- In office 1 August 2004 – 25 December 2006
- Mayor: Ma Ying-jeou; Hau Lung-pin
- Preceded by: Pai Hsiu-hsiung
- Succeeded by: Wu Ching-ji

Personal details
- Born: 30 August 1956 (age 70) Tainan, Taiwan
- Party: Kuomintang
- Education: National Chengchi University (BA); Texas Tech University (MA); University of Texas at Austin (PhD)

King Pu-tsung (Chinese: 金溥聰; pinyin: Jīn Pǔcōng; born 30 August 1956) is a Taiwanese journalist and politician. He was the secretary-general of the National Security Council from 2014 to 2015. Previously, he was the head of the Taipei Economic and Cultural Representative Office in the United States from 2012 to 2014 and the deputy mayor of Taipei from 2004 to 2006.

== Early life and education ==
King was born on 30 August 1956 in Kaohsiung, Taiwan, and was raised in Tainan. His father, Jin Shuo (金鑠), was a Taiwanese historian who taught at National Cheng Kung University. King was the youngest child and only son in his family. His father was Manchu and his mother was Han Chinese, and the couple met in Sichuan after his father fled there during the Second Sino-Japanese War. They eloped to northeastern China because their relationship had encountered family opposition, before eventually settling in Taiwan.

As a child, King participated in Manchu cultural activities, including New Year ceremonies honoring Nurhaci, the founder of the Later Jin dynasty. His family background attracted public attention because of claims that he was related to Puyi, the last emperor of China. In December 2009, King clarified that his father had identified their family as belonging to the Manchu Bordered Yellow Banner and the Pu (溥) generation, but that he had never claimed to be Puyi's cousin and did not know the precise degree of any familial relationship.

King attended National Tainan Second Senior High School. He graduated from National Chengchi University with a bachelor's degree in journalism in 1980. After completing his military service, King pursued graduate studies in the United States, earning a master's degree in mass communication from Texas Tech University in 1984. In 1987, King passed Taiwan's examination for diplomatic and consular personnel and received a Kuomintang Sun Yat-sen Scholarship, which enabled him to pursue doctoral studies the U.S. He earned his Ph.D. in communication studies from the University of Texas at Austin in 1994. His doctoral dissertation, completed under journalism scholar Maxwell McCombs, was titled, Issue Agendas in the 1992 Taiwan Legislative Election.

== Early career ==
After obtaining his master's degree, King returned to Taiwan and worked as a reporter for the Central Daily News. The professor who had recommended him to the paper predicted that he would become its editor-in-chief within 15 years, but King left after four months. King placed first in the national examination for international journalism personnel and trained for six months alongside Shih Ya-ping, who later headed the Government Information Office.

In 1985, King applied for a position in the Kuomintang (KMT)'s international relations office, where his interviewer was Ma Ying-jeou, then the party's youngest deputy secretary-general at the age of 35. King then worked under Ma on the party's foreign relations. He served as Ma's personal secretary while Ma was deputy secretary-general of the KMT Central Committee.

After earning his doctorate, King returned to teach at National Chengchi University, where Ma, who had resigned as a minister without portfolio, had also taken up a teaching post, making the two colleagues. King also worked as a part-time lecturer at Shih Hsin University, Tamkang University and Chinese Culture University, and as a specialist in the research and development division of the Executive Yuan's Research, Development and Evaluation Commission.

== Political and journalism career ==
When Ma decided in late May 1998 to run in the Taipei mayoral election, King was the first person he telephoned. During the campaign, King's nominal title was head of the Ma campaign's publicity group, though he held more influence than all of the campaign's other deputy managers. The publicity work led by King received praise, and the campaign slogan "Consistent all along the way" (一路走來，始終如一) was named one of the year's ten best phrases. The publicity team's original version of the slogan was "一路走來，休戚與共", which King changed because he found it awkward to say. After Ma won the election, King was considered a leading candidate for a post in the city government, but he declined Ma's invitations to join it several times and returned to his position as an associate professor of journalism at National Chengchi University.

King later served as director of the Taipei City Government's Department of Information. His forceful approach in dealing with the Taipei City Council drew attacks from councillors across party lines, and the council's then-speaker, Wu Pi-chu, labeled him as a "proud rooster". King left the director's post because he felt unable to adapt to a bureaucratic culture and did not wish to take part in traditional power games. He was succeeded as director of the Department of Information by Wu Yu-sheng.

Before the 2004 presidential election, King co-hosted the Era Television programme 數字向左走向右走 with Cheng Tsun-chi. In 2004, King resigned from his teaching post at National Chengchi University with the intention of becoming general manager and news director of a private television station. He had planned to consider an offer from ERA Group chairman Chiu Fu-sheng to become director of its news channel. Upon learning of his resignation, Ma, then mayor of Taipei, requested that he return to city government. King said that he decided to return after President Chen Shui-bian spoke of the Democratic Progressive Party achieving "perpetual rule", which prompted him to work toward a transfer of power between parties. He served as deputy mayor of Taipei from 2004 to 2006.

After Ma won the 2008 presidential election, King announced that he would not take up a position in either the Presidential Office or the cabinet. He instead signed a six-month contract as a visiting scholar at the Chinese University of Hong Kong, leaving for Hong Kong on 31 July 2008. In February 2009, King was named chief executive officer of Next Media's new television station and pledged objective reporting on the government despite being a close aide to Ma. Four months after taking the post, King resigned from the position in May 2009.

== KMT Secretary-General ==
As Secretary-General, King pledged to sort out financial questions of national funds that had been mixed with party assets, and urged party members to provide more than "lip service" to support party candidates in the run-up to the mayoral elections at the end of 2010.

== See also ==
- Taipei Economic and Cultural Representative Office
- Manchu people in Taiwan
