= Tseng Yung-chuan =

Taiwanese politician

- 曾永權
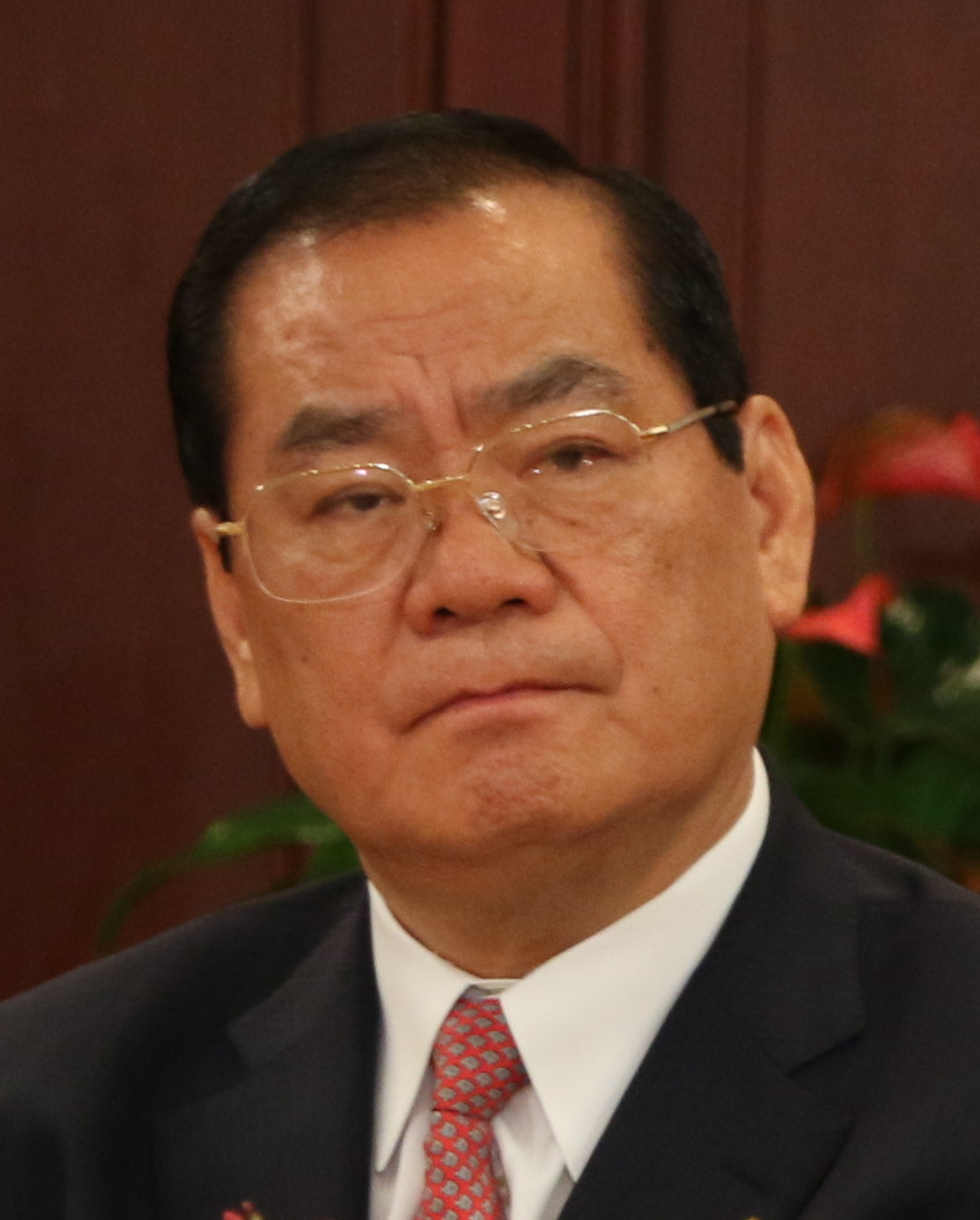
- Tseng Yung-chuan in 2015

Secretary-General to the President
- In office 12 February 2015 – 20 May 2016
- Preceded by: Timothy Yang
- Succeeded by: Lin Bih-jaw
- In office 6 February 2012 – 27 September 2012
- Deputy: Lo Chih-chiang, Liu Pao-kui
- Preceded by: Wu Jin-lin
- Succeeded by: Timothy Yang

Secretary-General of the Kuomintang
- In office 20 August 2017 – 15 January 2020
- Chairman: Wu Den-yih
- Preceded by: Himself
- Succeeded by: Tseng Ming-chung (Acting); Lee Chien-lung
- In office 12 July 2017 – 20 August 2017; Acting
- Chairman: Lin Junq-tzer (Acting)
- Preceded by: Mo Tien-hu
- Succeeded by: Himself
- In office 27 September 2012 – 3 June 2014
- Chairman: Ma Ying-jeou
- Preceded by: Lin Join-sane
- Succeeded by: Hung Hsiu-chu (Acting); Lee Shu-chuan

Vice President of the Legislative Yuan
- In office 1 February 2008 – 31 January 2012
- President: Wang Jin-pyng
- Preceded by: David Chung
- Succeeded by: Hung Hsiu-chu

Member of the Legislative Yuan
- In office 1 February 2008 – 31 January 2012
- Constituency: Republic of China
- In office 1 February 1993 – 31 January 2005
- Constituency: Pingtung County

Personal details
- Born: 10 September 1947 (age 78) Kaohsiung, Taiwan
- Party: Kuomintang
- Education: Feng Chia University (BS); Northrop University (MA)

Tseng Yung-chuan
- Traditional Chinese: 曾永權
- Simplified Chinese: 曾永权
Transcriptions
Standard Mandarin
- Hanyu Pinyin: Zēng Yǒngquán

Tseng Yung-chuan (born 10 September 1947) is a Taiwanese politician. He was the Secretary-General of the Kuomintang from 2012 to 2014.

== Education ==
Tseng graduated from Feng Chia University and earned a master's degree from Northrop University.

== Kuomintang Secretary-General ==
=== Secretary-General appointment ===
Tseng was appointed to be the Secretary-General of Kuomintang on 27 September 2012. He replaced Lin Join-sane from the position because of Lin's appointment to be the Chairman of Straits Exchange Foundation. Tseng vowed to work hard for the party's success in the 2014 seven-in-one local elections. He will also travel to every corner of Taiwan to listen to the voice of Taiwanese people. He vowed to insist on reform and integrity in government, strengthen the platform of the party and government and re-energize the party by encouraging more talented people to stand as KMT candidates in elections.

Party political offices
Preceded by Lin Join-sane	Secretary-General of the Kuomintang; 2012–2014	Succeeded by Hung Hsiu-chu (Acting)
Preceded by Mo Tien-hu	Secretary-General of the Kuomintang; 2017–2020	Succeeded by Tseng Ming-chung (Acting)
