= John Chiang =

John Chiang may refer to:

- David Chiang (born 1947), also known as John Chiang, Hong Kong actor
- John Chiang (Taiwan) (born 1942), Taiwanese politician
- John Chiang (California politician) (born 1962), American politician
- Johnny Chiang (born 1972), Taiwanese politician
