= Johnny Chiang =

Taiwanese politician and political scientist (born 1972)

Chiang Chi-chen
- 江啟臣
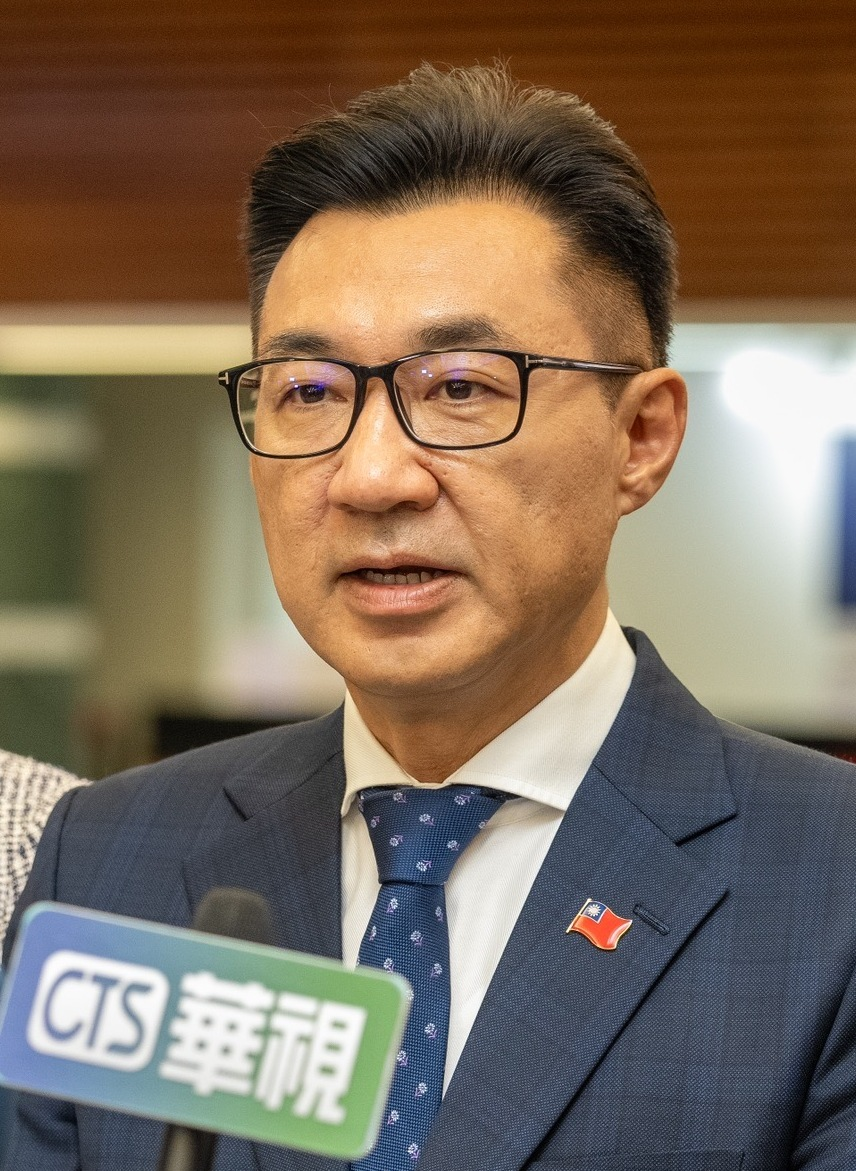
- Chiang in 2024

16th Vice President of the Legislative Yuan
- Incumbent
- Assumed office 1 February 2024
- President: Han Kuo-yu
- Preceded by: Tsai Chi-chang

Member of the Legislative Yuan
- Incumbent
- Assumed office 1 February 2012
- Preceded by: Shyu Jong-shyong (Taichung County 4th district)
- Constituency: Taichung 8

10th Chairman of the Kuomintang
- In office 9 March 2020 – 5 October 2021
- Secretary General: William Tseng; Lee Chien-lung
- Preceded by: Lin Rong-te (acting)
- Succeeded by: Eric Chu
Other offices
Minority Leader of the Legislative Yuan
In office 14 June 2018 – 1 February 2019
Speaker	Su Jia-chyuan
Preceded by	Lin Te-fu
Succeeded by	William Tseng
27th Director-General of the Government Information Office
In office 24 February 2010 – 1 May 2011
Prime Minister	Wu Den-yih
Preceded by	Su Jun-pin
Succeeded by	Philip Yang

Personal details
- Born: 2 March 1972 (age 54) Fengyuan, Taichung County, Taiwan
- Party: Kuomintang
- Education: National Chengchi University (BA); University of Pittsburgh (MA); University of South Carolina (PhD)
- Scientific career
- Fields: Political science
- Thesis: Globalization and the Role of the State in Contemporary Political Economy: Taiwan and India in the 1980s and 1990s (2002)

Military service
- Branch/service: Republic of China Army
- Years of service: 1994–1996
- Rank: Sergeant
- Unit: 101st Amphibious Reconnaissance Battalion

Chinese name
- Traditional Chinese: 江啟臣
- Simplified Chinese: 江启臣
Transcriptions
Standard Mandarin
- Hanyu Pinyin: Jiāng Qǐchén
- Wade–Giles: Chiang1 Chʻi3-chʻên
Southern Min
- Hokkien POJ: Kang Khé-sîn

Chiang Chi-chen (Chinese: 江啟臣; pinyin: Jiāng Qǐchén; born 2 March 1972), also known by his English name Johnny Chiang, is a Taiwanese political scientist and politician who has served as Vice President of the Legislative Yuan since 2024. A member of the Kuomintang (KMT), he has represented Taichung City Constituency 8 in the Legislative Yuan since 2012. He previously served as Chairman of the Kuomintang from 2020 to 2021 and as the party's legislative caucus leader from 2018 to 2019.

Born in Fengyuan, Taichung, Chiang graduated from National Chengchi University in 1994 before serving in the elite 101st Amphibious Reconnaissance Battalion for two years. After earning his doctorate in international relations from the University of South Carolina in 2002, he became a political science professor at Soochow University, specializing in international political economy and Asia-Pacific affairs. From 2010 to 2011, he served as director-general of the Government Information Office under President Ma Ying-jeou.

After being elected to the legislature in 2012, Chiang won consecutive terms in 2016, 2020, and 2024. He became chairman of the KMT in March 2020, leading the opposition party following its defeat in the 2020 general election, before losing his reelection bid to Eric Chu in 2021. In February 2024, he was elected vice president of the Legislative Yuan alongside speaker Han Kuo-yu. He is the KMT candidate for the Taichung mayoralty in the 2026 Taiwanese local elections.

== Early life and education ==
Chiang was born on 2 March 1972 in Fengyuan, then part of Taichung County. He was raised in a farming family that had cultivated citrus fruit for several generations. His father, Chiang Hai-chuan (江海泉), was a farmer. His paternal grandfather, Chiang Shui-yuan (江水源), served as a village chief for 42 years. Until the age of seven, Chiang lived with his paternal grandparents in the mountainous countryside near Fengyuan. He is of Hakka Chinese ancestry; his ancestors had migrated from Dabu County, Guangdong, to Zhao'an County, Fujian, before the family eventually settled in Taiwan.

As a child, Chiang was raised speaking Taiwanese Hokkien, though his grandparents also spoke Japanese. As a result, Chiang did not learn Taiwanese Mandarin until primary school. He attended Ruisui Elementary School (瑞穗國小), Fengnan Junior High School (豐南國中), and Taichung First Senior High School. In high school, he was a track-and-field athlete.

In 1990, Chiang enrolled at National Chengchi University, where he initially studied history before transferring departments to study diplomacy instead. He graduated with a bachelor's degree in diplomacy in 1994, ranked among the top of his graduating class. After graduation, Chiang began his compulsory military service in the Republic of China Army in August 1994. He served in the 101st Amphibious Reconnaissance Battalion, a special operations unit stationed on Kinmen. He was discharged in July 1996 with the rank of sergeant.

After completing his military service, Chiang pursued graduate studies in the United States, earning a master's degree in international affairs from the University of Pittsburgh in 1998. He then earned his Ph.D. in international relations from the University of South Carolina in 2002. His doctoral dissertation was titled, Globalization and the Role of the State in Contemporary Political Economy: Taiwan and India in the 1980s and 1990s.

== Academic career ==
Chiang taught as a lecturer at the University of South Carolina from January to May 2002. After returning to Taiwan, he became an associate research fellow at the Taiwan Institute of Economic Research (TIER), where he was a member of its International Affairs Division from July 2002 to July 2003. During the same period, he was an associate research fellow at the Asia-Pacific Economic Cooperation (APEC). Alongside his research appointments, Chiang taught as an adjunct assistant professor in the Department of International Trade at Taipei University of Marine Technology from September 2002 to June 2003. He also was an adjunct assistant professor of diplomacy at National Chengchi University from February to June 2003.

In July 2003, Chiang became an assistant professor of political science at Soochow University and was promoted to associate professor in February 2007. He also served as deputy secretary-general of the Chinese Taipei Committee of the Pacific Economic Cooperation Council (PECC), beginning in September 2005. He remained a part-time associate research fellow at TIER during this time. He also became deputy director and then acting director of the International Affairs Division at the institute.

Chiang became executive editor of the academic journal APEC Review in September 2002. In April 2005, he became editor-in-chief of APEC Newsletter (APEC簡訊), followed by an appointment as editor-in-chief of Asia-Pacific Today in May 2005. He also served on the editorial board of Taiwanese Journal of WTO Studies. From September 2006 to May 2008, he was a member of the editorial board of Cross-Strait Exchange (交流), a publication of the Straits Exchange Foundation.

== Government Information Office director (2010–2011) ==
On 24 February 2010, Chiang was appointed director-general of the Government Information Office (GIO) under President Ma Ying-jeou, succeeding Su Jun-pin. Premier Wu Den-yih had sought a younger official with international experience for the position and described his preferred candidate as a "young Jason Hu". On 25 February 2010, Chiang held his first government press conference, answering questions from journalists in both Mandarin Chinese and English.

In February 2011, Chiang submitted his resignation to Premier Wu in order to run as a candidate in the 2012 legislative election. On 29 April 2011, the Executive Yuan announced that Philip Yang (楊永明), a professor of political science at National Taiwan University, would succeed Chiang. Chiang's tenure ended on 1 May 2011, with the handover ceremony held the following day. At the ceremony, the Executive Yuan awarded Chiang its First-Class Merit Medal in recognition of his government service.

== Legislative Yuan ==
=== First term (2012–2016) ===
Chiang during a legislative session in October 2014

Chiang was elected to the Legislative Yuan in the 2012 legislative election as the Kuomintang (KMT) candidate for Taichung City Constituency 8, receiving 69,136 votes (44.77%) in a five-candidate race. His main opponent was former Democratic Progressive Party (DPP) legislator Kuo Chun-ming, who received 60,964 votes. Chiang took office on 1 February 2012 as a member of the eighth Legislative Yuan.

During the first two years of his term, Chiang served on the Legislative Yuan's Internal Administration Committee, becoming one of its conveners during the third legislative session in 2013. He also served as a convener of the Discipline Committee and the Constitutional Amendment Committee. His constituency work included advocating infrastructure improvements in the mountainous districts of eastern Taichung, particularly transportation links between Fengyuan and Dongshi. In May 2013, he organized a legislative petition calling on the Executive Yuan to arrange funding for the proposed Dongshi connector road, whose estimated construction cost was NT$8.9 billion. During his tenure on the Internal Administration Committee, Chiang also convened a public hearing concerning proposed amendments to the Act Governing Relations between the People of the Taiwan Area and the Mainland Area, including provisions affecting the residency and employment rights of Chinese spouses of Taiwanese citizens.

During the latter half of his first term, Chiang transferred to the Foreign Affairs and National Defense Committee, serving on it throughout the fifth through eighth legislative sessions.

=== Second term (2016–2020) ===
Chiang (middle) at a KMT press conference on Taiwan's sovereignty claims in the South China Sea, July 2016

Chiang was reelected in the 2016 legislative election, defeating DPP candidate Hsieh Chih-chung by 72,024 votes to 70,549, a margin of 1,475 votes. During his second term, he served on the Foreign Affairs and National Defense Committee and the Procedure Committee, holding convener positions on both committees during several legislative sessions. He additionally served as president of the Legislative Yuan's Taiwan–Singapore Parliamentary Friendship Association.

In February 2018, Chiang sought the KMT nomination for the 2018 Taichung mayoral election, but narrowly lost the party's primary to fellow legislator Lu Shiow-yen. Lu received an average polling result of 50.308 percent, compared with Chiang's 49.692 percent. On 14 June 2018, he was elected leader of the KMT's Legislative Yuan caucus.

=== Third and fourth terms (2020–present) ===
Chiang at a protest against the Lai Ching-te administration in Taipei, April 2025

Chiang won a third consecutive term in the 2020 legislative election, receiving 94,750 votes (59.03%) against DPP candidate Weng Mei-chun and a third-party challenger. During the tenth Legislative Yuan, he continued serving on the Foreign Affairs and National Defense Committee.

Chiang was reelected for a fourth consecutive term in the 2024 legislative election, defeating DPP candidate Hsieh Chih-chung by 88,651 votes (57.87%) to 64,542 votes (42.13%). On 1 February 2024, he was elected Vice President of the Legislative Yuan, defeating the incumbent deputy speaker Tsai Chi-chang of the DPP in a second-round vote by 54 votes to 51. The election followed the selection of fellow KMT legislator Han Kuo-yu as speaker earlier that day, in a legislature where no party held an outright majority.

In 2025, during the Taiwanese mass electoral recall campaigns, Chiang became the subject of a recall campaign that criticized his handling of legislative proceedings as deputy speaker and questioned his record on local infrastructure development. The recall referendum was held on 23 August 2025 and was defeated, with 69,796 votes against removing Chiang from office and 33,977 votes in favor.

== Chairman of the Kuomintang (2020–2021) ==
Following the Kuomintang's defeat in the 2020 Taiwanese general election, party chairman Wu Den-yih resigned, prompting an election to fill the vacant leadership position. Chiang announced his candidacy on 25 January 2020, campaigning on generational renewal and organizational reform. On 7 March 2020, he defeated former Taipei mayor Hau Lung-pin in the 2020 Kuomintang chairmanship by-election, receiving 84,860 votes (68.8%) against Hau's 38,483 votes (31.2%). At the age of 48, Chiang became the youngest chairman in the party's history and the first sitting member of the Legislative Yuan to hold the position. He assumed office on 9 March 2020, succeeding acting chairman Lin Rong-te.

Chiang (center) addressing protesters outside the Legislative Yuan during the KMT's occupation of the legislature, June 2020

In his inaugural address, Chiang outlined three priorities for the KMT's development: cooperation between generations, internal democratization, and digital transformation. On 17 March 2020, he appointed former New Taipei City party chairman Lee Chien-lung (李乾龍) as secretary-general and former legislator Lee Yen-hsiu as a deputy secretary-general, alongside four other deputy secretaries-general, including Ko Chih-en and Huang Kwei-bo (黃奎博). His initial appointments did not include a vice-chairman, while several positions were assigned to younger former legislators and party officials.

On 16 February 2021, Chiang was named to Time magazine's 2021 TIME100 Next list, which included Chiang for his efforts to reform the KMT's generational appeal and cross-strait policies.

On 20 February 2021, Chiang announced that he would seek reelection as KMT chairman. On 17 August 2021, Chiang registered for the election, facing former KMT chairman Eric Chu, party member Chang Ya-chung, and former Changhua County commissioner Cho Po-yuan. In the leadership election held on 25 September, Chiang finished third with 35,090 votes (18.87%), behind Chu's 85,164 votes (45.78%) and Chang's 60,632 votes (32.59%). He appointed Deputy Secretary-General Lee Yen-hsiu to organize the leadership transition. On 29 September, the KMT's Central Standing Committee approved an accelerated transfer of leadership to Chu, who succeeded Chiang as chairman on 5 October 2021.

== Personal life ==
Chiang is married to Liu Tzu-ling (劉姿伶), the daughter of former KMT legislator Liu Shen-liang, with whom he has a daughter and a son. They married in 2004. Chiang's extended family includes journalist and political commentator Antonio Chiang (江春男), a cousin of his father who previously served as deputy secretary-general of Taiwan's National Security Council.

Political offices
Preceded by Su Jun-pin	Director General of the Government Information Office; 2010–2011	Succeeded by Philip Yang
Party political offices
Preceded by Lin Rong-te; Acting	Chairman of the Kuomintang; 2020–2021	Succeeded by Eric Chu
