= Lee Tsung-cheng =

Taiwanese politician (born 1934)

Lee Tsung-cheng (Chinese: 李宗正; born 1934) is a Taiwanese former politician.

Lee was a party list member of the Legislative Yuan from 1993 to 1996 and represented the Kuomintang. In a November 2000 Taiwan High Court ruling against Wu Tse-yuan, Lee was found to have accepted bribes from Kuo-feng Corporation in 1992.
