= Taiwan Land Development Corporation =

Taiwan Land Developer Company

Taiwan Land Development Co., Ltd
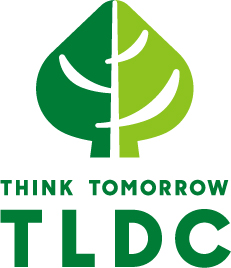
- Trade name: 台灣土地
- Native name: 台灣土地開發股份有限公司
- Company type: Public
- Traded as: TWSE:2841
- Industry: land development
- Founded: June 30, 1964
- Headquarters: B2F., No. 2, Sec. 1, Chongqing S. Rd., Zhongzheng Dist., Taipei City, Taiwan R.O.C.
- Area served: Taiwan
- Key people: Vicki Chiu, Chairwoman; Chiu Vicki, President
- Website: www.tldc.com.tw

Taiwan Land Development Co., Ltd., (Chinese: 台灣土地開發股份有限公司) commonly referred to as TLDC or Taikai, is a real estate land development enterprise in Taiwan.

== History ==
Founded in 1964, TLDC assisted Chiang Kai-shek's government in the development of 30 industrial zones and a number of commercial and residential areas. In 1999, TLDC stock was listed, and in 2008, TLDC's government holdings were released and re-elected as directors and supervisors, and Chiu Fu-sheng was elected Chairman.

In September 2021, Chiu Fu-sheng's daughter Vicki Chiu, former director and president of TLDC, took over as chairwoman. And, her father became the president of the company.

== Controversies ==
- In 2005, the company faced an insider trading investigation, when it shares were unethically traded by the local real estate developers after the critical business information was passed to them by then-chairman Su Teh-chien.

== Development Projects ==
- Kinmen Wind Lion Plaza
- Hualien LOHAS Creative Park
- Hsinchu Hsinpu Eco-community
- Huilanwan Sunrise Village
