= Kao Koong-lian =

Taiwanese economist and politician

- 高孔廉
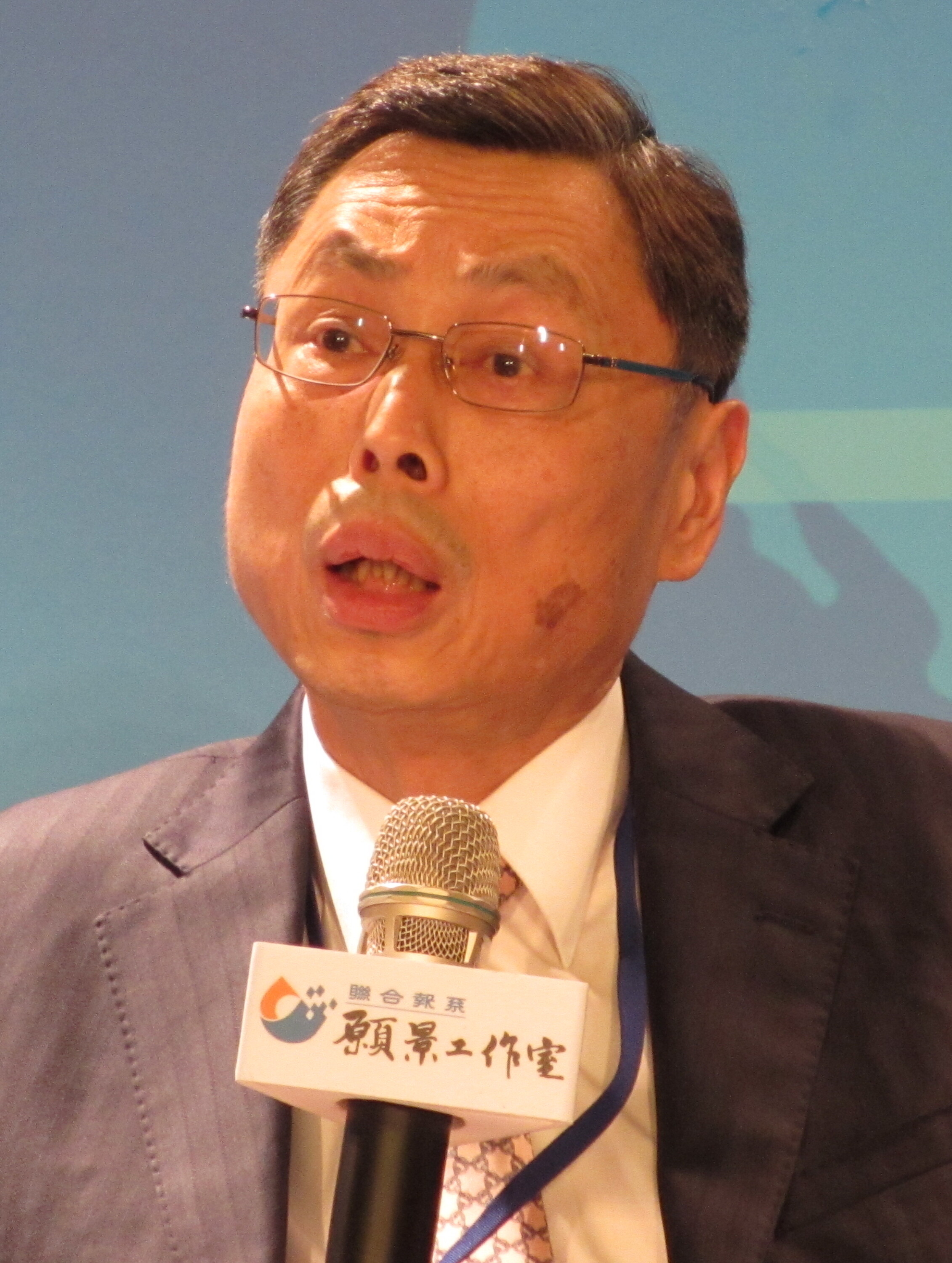

Vice Chairman and Secretary-General of the Straits Exchange Foundation
- In office 20 May 2008 – 6 February 2014
- Chairman: Chiang Pin-kung; Lin Join-sane
- Deputy Secretary-General: Ma Shaw-chang
- Succeeded by: Chang Hsien-yao

Minister of the Mongolian and Tibetan Affairs Commission of the Executive Yuan
- In office 1997 – 20 May 2000
- Preceded by: Lee Hou-kao
- Succeeded by: Hsu Cheng-kuang

Deputy Minister of the Mainland Affairs Council of the Executive Yuan
- In office 28 February 1996 – 1997
- Chairman: Chang King-yuh

Minister of the Mainland Affairs Council of the Executive Yuan (acting)
- In office 3 December 1995 – 27 February 1996
- Preceded by: Vincent Siew
- Succeeded by: Chang King-yuh

Deputy Minister of the Mainland Affairs Council of the Executive Yuan
- In office 1991 – 3 December 1995
- Chairman: Shih Chi-yang; Huang Kun-huei; Vincent Siew

Personal details
- Born: 9 November 1944 (age 82) Minhou, Fukien, Republic of China
- Party: Kuomintang
- Education: National Chengchi University (BA, MBA); University of Connecticut (MA); Louisiana State University (PhD)

Kao Koong-lian (Chinese: 高孔廉; pinyin: Gāo Kǒnglián; born 9 November 1944) is a Taiwanese economist and politician. He was the vice chairman and secretary-general of the Straits Exchange Foundation (SEF) from 2008 to 2014.

== Education ==
Kao graduated from National Chengchi University with a bachelor's degree in banking and finance in 1965 and a Master of Business Administration (M.B.A.) in 1969. He then completed graduate studies in the United States, where he earned a Master of Arts (M.A.) in economics from the University of Connecticut in 1979 and his Ph.D. in economics from Louisiana State University in 1975. His doctoral dissertation, completed under economics professor Roger L. Burford, was titled, "An Economic Analysis of Interregional Migration in Louisiana and Its Policy Implications for Population Distribution".

== ROC Mongolian and Tibetan Affairs Commission chairmanship ==
=== ROC and Tibet relations improvement ===
Speaking at a press conference in Taipei in January 1998, Kao said that the ROC government was willing to enhance its relations with the Tibetan government-in-exile in India. He added that the commission was willing to provide aid to all Tibetans, irrespective of their political beliefs, and that the ROC government was committed to the reunification of China.

== SEF secretary-general and vice chairmanship ==
=== 20th anniversary of the 1992 Consensus ===
In November 2012, during a conference commemorating the 20th anniversary of the 1992 Consensus, Kao said that the consensus was a temporary measure to regulate relations between the two sides of the Taiwan Strait in which both sides agreed to set aside differences. However, he emphasized that the two sides needed to take another step forward in agreeing to not repudiate each other's jurisdiction and to establish cross-strait comprehensive offices on a reciprocal basis.

He added that SEF was the temporary mediator between two government agencies across the Taiwan Strait. Once all of the communication channels between the two sides have been well-established, SEF may no longer be needed.

He pointed out that over the past two decades, Taiwanese identity had changed significantly, adding that Taiwanese identity had been reinforced heavily within Taiwan. This is something that both Beijing and Taipei should guard against.

=== 2013 mainland China visit ===
Kao and SEF officials left for mainland China in mid-April 2013 to visit Taiwanese companies operating in Chengdu and Chongqing and met with senior executives of Taiwanese businesses. He discussed problems they were facing or if there was any assistance SEF could provide to help them.

The SEF delegations were still in Sichuan province when the 2013 Ya'an earthquake struck Lushan on 20 April 2013. The SEF spokesman said that SEF would offer help to the earthquake relief efforts based on the severity of the disaster.

=== Cross-strait service trade ===
In the end of June 2013, Kao joined a delegation led by Lin Join-sane, Chairman of the Straits Exchange Foundation (SEF), to visit Shanghai from Taiwan for the Cross-Strait Service Trade Agreement signing. The Taiwanese delegation included Cho Shih-chao, Vice Minister of Economic Affairs, and Chang Hsien-yao, Deputy Minister of Mainland Affairs Council.

The cross-strait service trade agreement was signed on 21 June 2013 and consisted of four chapters and twenty-four articles. Under the agreement, 64 Taiwanese industries would be opened to mainland Chinese investments, ranging from transportation, tourism and traditional Chinese medicine sectors. Meanwhile, 80 mainland Chinese industries would be opened to Taiwanese investments, ranging from finance, retail, electronics, publishing and travel sectors.

=== SEF resignation ===
On 10 January 2014, Kao tendered his resignation from his SEF post and left the office on 6 February 2014 with no future posting. His resignation was approved by President Ma Ying-jeou a week earlier.

== Later political career ==
In February 2021, the Kuomintang announced that a proposal to appoint Kao to the party's Central Advisory Committee would be considered during the 21st National Congress.
