= Chang King-yuh =

Taiwanese lawyer and political scientist

- 張京育

Minister of Mainland Affairs Council of the Republic of China
- In office 28 February 1996 – 31 January 1999
- Preceded by: Vincent Siew; Kao Koong-lian (acting)
- Succeeded by: Su Chi

Minister without Portfolio
- In office 14 March 1994 – 10 June 1996

Director-General of Government Information Office of the Republic of China
- In office September 1984 – April 1987
- Preceded by: James Soong
- Succeeded by: Shao Yu-ming

Personal details
- Born: 27 April 1937 (age 89) Xiangtan, Hunan, Republic of China
- Party: Kuomintang
- Spouse: Grace Yu (m. 1964)
- Children: 2 sons
- Education: National Taiwan University (LLB); National Chengchi University (MA); Columbia University (MA, PhD)

Chang King-yuh (Chinese: 張京育; pinyin: Zhāng Jīngyù; born 27 April 1937) is a Taiwanese political scientist and lawyer. He was Minister of the Mainland Affairs Council of the Executive Yuan from 28 February 1996 to 31 January 1999.

== Early life and education ==
Chang was born in China to Shao Chu Chang and Hsi-chen Huang. He graduated from National Taiwan University with a bachelor's degree in law in 1958 and earned a master's degree in diplomacy from National Chengchi University in 1961. He then completed graduate studies in the United States at Columbia University, where he earned a Master of Laws (LL.M.) in comparative law from Columbia Law School in 1964 and then his Ph.D. in political science in 1971. His doctoral dissertation was titled, "The United Nations and decolonization 1960-1968: the role of the committee of twenty-four".

== Early career ==
Chang was the President of National Chengchi University from 1989 to 1994.

== See also ==
- Cross-Strait relations
- Straits Exchange Foundation
- Taiwan Affairs Office
