= National Tsing Hua University Scientific Research Industrialization Platform of Five Universities Alliance =

University alliance in Taiwan

NTHU Scientific Research Industrialization Platform of Five Universities Alliance
- Type: Public and Private
- Established: 2021
- President: NTHU GLORIA
- Location: Hsinchu City (Headquarter), Taiwan
- Campus: Urban and Suburb
- Website: https://tgloria.iih.nthu.edu.tw/content.php?key=AMT1LM7T66

Chinese name
- Simplified Chinese: 清华五校联盟
- Traditional Chinese: 清華五校聯盟
Transcriptions
Standard Mandarin
- Hanyu Pinyin: Qīnghuá Wǔxiào Liánméng
Southern Min
- Hokkien POJ: Chheng-hôa Ngóo-hāu Liân-bêng

National Tsing Hua University Scientific Research Industrialization Platform of Five Universities Alliance (Chinese: 清華五校聯盟; "Tsinghua Big Five Alliance") is a platform for industrialization of scientific research (industry-university alliance) supported by the Ministry of Science and Technology of Taiwan (MOST), with the National Tsing Hua University (NTHU) in Hsinchu as the head, and the integration of five universities.

== Organization ==
National Tsing Hua University (NTHU), in line with the policy of the Ministry of Science and Technology, promotes the development of "industrial demand-oriented", "cutting-edge technology research and development", "multi-industry cooperation themes" and "industrialization of scientific research results" in Taiwan's industry-university cooperation. On January 27, 2021, five major universities in Taiwan including NTHU form an alliance.

The five universities have formed teams with complementary fields, and cooperated with each other to develop technology and cultivate talents in major fields (below), and build an industry-university cooperation model of "enterprise questions and schools solve problems".

#	Institution	Abbr.	City	Major fields	URL
1	National Tsing Hua University	NTHU	Hsinchu	Information technology, Biotechnology	Homepage
2	National Chengchi University	NCCU	Taipei	Financial technology、Corporate governance	Homepage
3	Fu Jen Catholic University	FJCU	New Taipei	Biomedicine	Homepage
4	Feng Chia University	FCU	Taichung	National security technologies, Human ecology	Homepage
5	Tamkang University	TKU	New Taipei	Renewable energy	Homepage

== History ==
- January 27, 2021: The alliance was formed.
- June 2021: Fu Jen Catholic University (FJCU) and National Tsing Hua University (NTHU) "SPARK Taiwan Program" began to call for applications.
- September 2021: FJCU and Eastern Media International (EMI) signed a contract to establish the "Fu Jen-EMI Health Industry-Academia Center" and "Fu Jen-EMI Smart Data Center". Representatives from the five universities jointly observed the ceremony.
- November 2021:
  - 2021 Japan-Taiwan Symposium. The president of Japan Society for the Promotion of Science (JST), Michijo Hamaguchi, and Kyoto University, Nara Institute of Science and Technology, FJCU, and NTHU presidents, vice presidents and scholars (including Nobel-level scholar Susumu Kitagawa) attended the meeting.
  - The Alliance exhibited at BioASIA International Conference & Exhibition.

== COVID-19 rapid test service ==
In response to the worldwide COVID-19 pandemic, the Alliance has been established to provide rapid test services to domestic enterprises, which will be implemented by Fu Jen Catholic University and Fu Jen Catholic University Hospital.

== See also ==
- National Applied Research Laboratories
- Industrial Technology Research Institute
