= Vincent Siew =

Taiwanese politician (born 1939)

Siew Wan-chang
- 蕭萬長
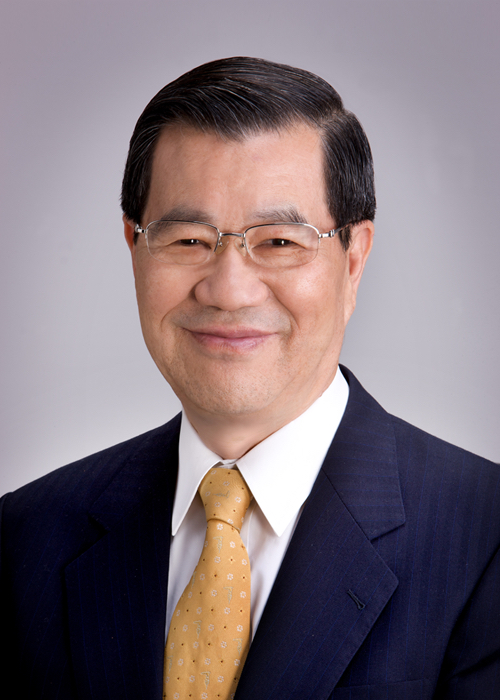

9th Vice President of the Republic of China
- In office 20 May 2008 – 20 May 2012
- President: Ma Ying-jeou
- Preceded by: Annette Lu
- Succeeded by: Wu Den-yih

Premier of the Republic of China
- In office 1 September 1997 – 20 May 2000
- President: Lee Teng-hui
- Vice Premier: John Chiang; Liu Chao-shiuan
- Preceded by: Lien Chan
- Succeeded by: Tang Fei

Vice Chairman of the Kuomintang
- In office 18 June 2000 – 23 March 2005
- Chairman: Lien Chan

Minister of the Mainland Affairs Council
- In office 15 December 1994 – 3 December 1995
- Premier: Lien Chan
- Preceded by: Huang Kun-huei
- Succeeded by: Kao Koong-lian (acting); Chang King-yuh

Minister of the Council for Economic Planning and Development
- In office 27 February 1993 – 15 December 1994
- Premier: Lien Chan
- Preceded by: Shirley Kuo
- Succeeded by: Hsu Li-teh

Minister of Economic Affairs
- In office 1 June 1990 – 27 February 1993
- Premier: Hau Pei-tsun
- Preceded by: Chen Li-an
- Succeeded by: Chiang Pin-kung

Personal details
- Born: 3 January 1939 (age 87) Kagi City, Tainan Prefecture, Japanese Taiwan (modern-day West District, Chiayi, Taiwan)
- Party: Kuomintang
- Spouse: Susan Chu
- Education: National Chengchi University (BA, MA); Georgetown University

Chinese name
- Traditional Chinese: 蕭萬長
- Simplified Chinese: 萧万长
Transcriptions
Standard Mandarin
- Hanyu Pinyin: Xiāo Wàncháng
- Wade–Giles: Hsiao¹ Wan⁴-ch’ang²
Southern Min
- Hokkien POJ: Siau Bān-tiông

Siew Wan-chang (Chinese: 蕭萬長; pinyin: Xiāo Wàncháng; Pe̍h-ōe-jī: Siau Bān-tiâng; born 3 January 1939), known also by his English name Vincent Siew, is a Taiwanese politician who served as the ninth vice president of the Republic of China from 2008 to 2012. He was the first Taiwanese-born premier of the Republic of China and former vice-chairman of the Kuomintang (KMT).

== Early life and education ==
Siew was born in Chiayi on January 3, 1939, during the Japanese rule of Taiwan. After graduating from National Chiayi Senior High School in 1957, he studied diplomacy at National Chengchi University (NCCU) and graduated with a bachelor's degree in 1961. He then completed two years of military service in the Republic of China Armed Forces and passed the Foreign Affairs Special Examination in 1962.

In 1965, Siew earned a master's degree in international law and diplomacy from NCCU. Although he was accepted by Harvard University, Siew chose to remain in Taiwan heeding his mother's wishes. He completed a leadership seminar at Georgetown University in the United States in 1982 and was awarded Eisenhower Fellowships in 1985.

== Political career ==
In April 1966, he was appointed as vice consul at the ROC Consulate-General in Kuala Lumpur, Malaysia, and promoted as consul in 1969, a position he held until 1972. During his office term, he built close relationship between Taiwan and the governments and people of Malaysia and Singapore. He also successfully negotiated the establishment of the Trade Mission of the Republic of China in Singapore and its counterpart Singapore Trade Office in Taipei.

After the switch of China seat at the United Nations on 25 October 1971 from Republic of China (ROC) to the People's Republic of China (PRC) and amid massive changes within the international community, Siew determined to return to Taiwan. Once home, he became a section chief at the Department of East Asian and Pacific Affairs of the Ministry of Foreign Affairs (MOFA).

He then joined the Board of Foreign Trade (BOFT) under the MOFA in 1972 which he rose from an inspector, department director until deputy director-general. He used to travel frequently between Taiwan and the United States (US) for bilateral trade agreement negotiation until the US switched diplomatic relations from ROC to PRC on 1 January 1979. In January 1982, he became the director-general of BOFT. During his office term, he worked towards simplifying laws and regulations, and also strengthening personnel management at the BOFT. To reduce the trade surplus between Taiwan and the US, he led trade missions to cover almost all US states as part of a campaign that drew considerable attention. He also participated in a number of additional trade missions to major trading nations to enhance economic and trade relations and resolve trade disputes. He vigorously promoted trade liberalization and globalization. He also authorized banks to process import-export permits, promoted professional training and introduced a rotating system for economic and trade representatives stationed outside Taiwan. His efforts helped build Taiwan's very substantial foreign-exchange reserves and made Taiwan the world's 13th largest trading nation.

As a member of the ruling Kuomintang (KMT), he was named to the Central Committee of KMT in July 1988.

Siew was elected a member of the Legislative Yuan from 1996 to 1997. He was the KMT vice-presidential candidate in 2000 on the ticket of Lien Chan.

Siew is the former chairman of the Chung-Hua Institution for Economic Research (Siew submitted his resignation 24 June 2007 after his KMT vice-presidential nomination) and the incumbent chairman of the Cross-Straits Common Market Foundation. He resigned as KMT vice chairman and all other posts in the party before the legislative election in December 2004. He was criticised by the Pan-Blue Coalition for not taking a greater role in the Lien-Soong campaign and acting as convener for a private group of economic advisers for President Chen Shui-bian.

== Ministry of Economic Affairs ==
With the appointment of new Premier on 1 June 1990, Siew was appointed as Minister of Economic Affairs. His appointment came at a time of problems with environment, stagnant investment and slow economic growth. Within six months, he managed to settle a five-year dispute with environmentalists that had been blocking Chinese Petroleum Corporation's construction of a fifth naphtha cracker plant. He also settled a yen-year dispute between local government and a community over the construction of Changbin Industrial Park. Moreover, he succeeded in persuading Formosa Plastics Corp to invest in a major construction project, the sixth naphtha cracker plant in Yunlin County. He also overcame a legislative freeze of the budget of the Lungmen Nuclear Power Plant in Taipei County.

During his overall office term in the ministry, Siew promoted major investment programs, removed investment barriers, enhanced investment incentives and initiated the privatization of such state enterprises as China Steel, BES Engineering and China Petrochemical Development. He also eased government controls on cross-strait trade and investments. He led a delegation to Europe, Central America and South America to explore opportunities for international economic and trade cooperation which also contributed to the promotion of trade diplomacy.

=== 1991 and 1992 APEC ===
In November 1991, Siew represented ROC, under the name Chinese Taipei, for the Asia-Pacific Economic Cooperation (APEC) held in Seoul, South Korea. In November 1992, he again represented Chinese Taipei for APEC in Bangkok, Thailand. After a series of negotiations, he managed to secure ROC, under the name Chinese Taipei, as an observer member.

== Council for Economic Planning and Development ==
=== CEPD vice chairmanship ===
In 1988–1989, he was appointed as the vice chairman of Council for Economic Planning and Development (CEPD) in which during his office term, he promoted major infrastructure projects, such as the straightening of Keelung River, the placement of Taipei City rail lines underground, the construction of the East–West Highway, the diversion of Chichi River and the expansion of Kaohsiung International Airport.

=== CEPD chairmanship ===
In February 1993, Siew was appointed as the chairman of CEPD. In June 1993, he announced his economic stimulus package aiming at promoting steady economic growth, as Taiwan's economy was at that time experiencing stagnant export growth and production levels. In August 1993, he completed a review of the Six-Year National Development Plan of the ROC and assigned priorities to projects on the basis of availability of resources and the maintenance of financial stability. In July 1994, he undertook major administrative reform with the introduction of a program to streamline bidding procedures for public construction projects and government procurement. He also initiated a program to develop Taiwan into an operation center for the Asia-Pacific region.

=== 1993 and 1994 APEC ===
As the chairman, he represented President Lee Teng-hui, who was forbidden to attend personally, at the 1993 and 1994 annual APEC leaders' summits held in November 1993 and November 1994 at Seattle, United States and Bogor, Indonesia respectively. At both meetings, he presented papers on Taiwan's successful experience in the development of agriculture and small and medium-sized enterprises. The action plans proposed in the papers won the approval of APEC support and helped promote Taiwan in the international trade and investment arenas.

== Mainland Affairs Council ==
On 15 December 1994, Siew was appointed to become the Minister of Mainland Affairs Council replacing Huang Kun-huei. During his office term, he proposed a fresh series of measures and actions to relax restrictions on trade with and investment in Mainland China to encourage the development of Cross-Strait relations through trade and investment activities.

== ROC premiership ==
=== Premiership appointment ===
Siew was appointed as the Premier by President Lee Teng-hui after the 15th National Congress of Kuomintang held in August 1997 in Taipei. Siew took office on 1 September 1997.

=== Taiwan's nuclear waste storage in mainland China ===
Premier Siew instructed Taiwan Power Company to sign the unpublished agreement with mainland China regarding Taiwan's nuclear waste storage in Gansu province. A memorandum of it was signed during his term as Premier, although it was later suspended after the transfer of power in 2000 to Premier Tang Fei.

=== 2000 presidential election ===
On 18 March 2000, Siew joined the 2000 presidential election as a candidate for vice president with his running mate Lien Chan. However, Siew and Lien lost the election to Chen Shui-bian and Annette Lu of the Democratic Progressive Party.

== ROC vice presidency ==
=== 2008 ROC vice presidential election ===
In May 2007, Siew was mentioned as a possible running mate for KMT presidential nominee Ma Ying-Jeou. This speculation came to fruition after Legislative Yuan Speaker Wang Jin-pyng declined Ma's offer to be his running mate. On 23 June 2007, ending weeks of speculation, Ma formally introduced Siew to be his vice-presidential running mate. The 2008 run is Siew's second ticket, having been selected also as the vice-presidential candidate of Lien Chan's KMT ticket in 2000.

On March 22, Ma and Siew won the 2008 presidential elections. He and Ma won with 7,659,014 (58.45%) votes against Hsieh and Su's 5,444,949 (41.55%) votes.

=== 2008 Boao Forum for Asia ===
On 11 April 2008, Vincent Siew departed Taiwan to attend the Boao Forum for Asia, held in Boao, Hainan, which is administered by mainland China. Siew is a founding delegate of the forum from 2001, and he attended once again in his capacity as chairman of the Cross-Straits Common Market Foundation. Siew had met with Chinese Communist Party general secretary Hu Jintao in Bo'ao in 2001. However, his special status as the vice president-elect in 2008 made his attendance more significant, but also more controversial in Taiwan. His meeting with Hu Jintao was the highest level exchange between Taiwan and mainland China since the 2005 Pan-Blue visits to mainland China. The level of reception for Siew in Hainan was scaled accordingly and was equivalent to that reserved for Lien Chan in 2005.

On 12 April 2008, Vincent Siew met with Hu Jintao at the Boao Asia Forum as part of the Cross-Strait Common Market Foundation delegation, which also included other former and future government officials and business leaders from Taiwan. At the meeting, Siew and Hu exchanged their optimism for cross-strait relations under the new Taiwanese leadership of Ma Ying-jeou and Vincent Siew. Hu asked Siew to convey his greetings to Ma Ying-jeou, Kuomintang chairman Wu Po-hsiung and chairman emeritus Lien Chan. Siew raised the issue of regular cross-strait flights and the resumption of regular talks between the two governments, propositions to which Hu expressed agreement.

=== Vice presidency sworn-in ===
Siew, along with Ma, was sworn in on 20 May 2008 in Taipei to be Vice President and President of the Republic of China respectively.

=== First overseas trip as vice president ===
On 4 September 2008, Siew embarked on his first overseas trip as vice president, visiting Swaziland for four days. Siew's trip aimed to cement further the diplomatic ties between the two countries, and to celebrate King Mswati III's fortieth birthday. Foreign Minister Francisco Ou accompanied Siew on the trip.

=== 2012 vice presidency election ===
Siew declined to run for a second term in Ma's 2012 re-election bid. Ma, instead, nominated Premier Wu Den-yih for the vice presidential slot on the ticket.

== Post political career ==
=== 2014 Boao Forum for Asia ===
Siew, in his capacity as the honorary chairman of the Cross-Straits Common Market Foundation, attended the Boao Forum for Asia held in April 2014 in Hainan where he met with Premier Li Keqiang. He reiterated the intention of Taiwan to join the Regional Comprehensive Economic Partnership. He also told Li that Taiwan and mainland China should push for greater bilateral trade liberalization to build a comprehensive economic relationship and express Taiwan's wish to join the regional economy.

=== 2014 APEC China ===
In November 2014 in his capacity of the Economic Leader of Chinese Taipei, Siew flew to Beijing to attend the APEC China 2014 where he met with Chinese Communist Party general secretary Xi Jinping at the Great Hall of the People. Both leaders agreed that there should be no changes in the 1992 Consensus and two other principles in pushing forward with the development of cross-Strait relations. Xi said that although relations of both sides have seen some progress over the past few years, there had been also some new problems. He added that the two sides should try to maintain the long-term and healthy development of relation by improving the confidence, mutual trust, respect and interaction. Part of Siew delegation included Mainland Affairs Council Minister Wang Yu-chi and several Taiwanese business people.

== Personal life ==
Siew is married to Susan Chu (Chinese: 朱俶賢; pinyin: Zhū Chùxián; Wade–Giles: Chu^{1} Ch'u^{4}-hsien^{2}) with three daughters: Ru-ting (蕭如婷), Ru-fen (蕭如芬) and Jhih-you (蕭至佑). Susan is a graduate from the Department of International Trade of National Chengchi University.

Siew speaks Hokkien, Mandarin and English.

Siew's constant smile has earned him the affectionate nickname "Smiling Siew" (微笑老蕭).

Siew had two cancerous lung tumors removed on his left lung on 20 May 2009 at the Taipei Veterans General Hospital. He was then discharged from the hospital on 3 June 2009.

== Honours ==
- Taiwan:
  - Grand Cordon of the Order of Chiang Chung-Cheng – 2012
  - Special Grand Cordon of the Order of Propitious Clouds – 2000

=== Foreign ===
- Belize:
  - Grand Cross of the Order of Distinction
- Dominican Republic:
  - Grand Cross with Silver Breast Star of the Order of Merit of Duarte, Sánchez and Mella
- El Salvador:
  - Grand Cross with Silver Star of the National Order of Doctor José Matías Delgado
- Haiti:
  - Grand Cross of the National Order of Honour and Merit
- Panama:
  - Grand Cross of the Order of Vasco Núñez de Balboa – 2010
- Paraguay:
  - Grand Cross of the National Order of Merit
- Senegal:
  - Grand Cross of the National Order of Merit
- South Korea:
  - Grand Gwanghwa Medal of the Order of Diplomatic Service Merit

== See also ==
- Politics of the Republic of China
- Elections in the Republic of China
- History of the Republic of China
- Administrative divisions of the Republic of China

Political offices
Preceded by Chen Li-an	Minister of Economic Affairs; 1990–1993	Succeeded by Chiang Pin-kung
Preceded by Shirley Kuo	Minister of the Council for Economic Planning and Development; 1993–1994	Succeeded by Hsu Li-teh
Preceded by Huang Kun-huei	Minister of the Mainland Affairs Council; 1994–1995	Succeeded by Kao Koong-lian as Acting minister
Preceded by Lien Chan	Premier of the Republic of China; 1997–2000	Succeeded by Tang Fei
Preceded by Annette Lu	Vice President of the Republic of China; 2008–2012	Succeeded by Wu Den-yih
Party political offices
Preceded by Lien Chan	Kuomintang nominee for Vice President of the Republic of China; 2000	Succeeded by James Soong
Preceded by James Soong	Kuomintang nominee for Vice President of the Republic of China; 2008	Succeeded by Wu Den-yih
