= Liu Shen-liang =

Taiwanese politician

Liu Shen-liang MLY
- 劉盛良

Member of the Legislative Yuan
- In office 1 February 2005 – 31 January 2012
- Constituency: Republic of China
- In office 1 February 1996 – 31 January 2002
- Constituency: Taipei County 3rd
- In office 1 February 1990 – 31 January 1993
- Constituency: Taipei County

Personal details
- Born: 18 March 1939 (age 87) Taihoku Prefecture, Taiwan, Empire of Japan
- Party: Kuomintang
- Education: Tatung University (BS); Tamkang University (MA)

Liu Shen-liang (Chinese: 劉盛良; pinyin: Liú Shèngliáng; born 18 March 1939) is a Taiwanese politician. A member of the Kuomintang, Liu served on the Legislative Yuan from 1990 to 1993, between 1996 and 2002, and again from 2005 to 2012.

== Education ==
Liu earned a bachelor's degree from Tatung University, and also studied at Tamkang University.

== Political career ==
Liu served on the Taipei County Council from 1977 to 1990. He was then elected to three separate stints on the Legislative Yuan, covering five terms.

== Personal ==
His daughter is married to Johnny Chiang.
