= Lin Join-sane =

Taiwanese politician (born 1944)

- 林中森
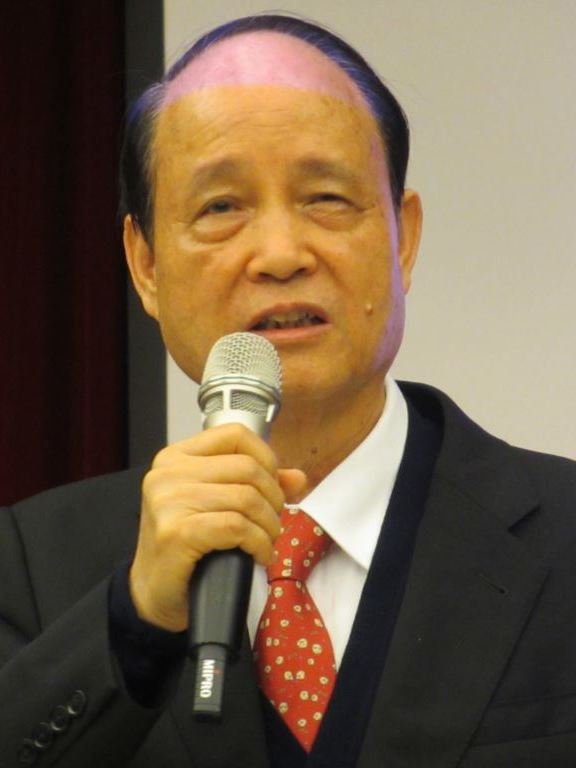

Chairman of Straits Exchange Foundation
- In office 27 September 2012 – 20 May 2016
- Deputy: Ma Shaw-chang
- Vice: Kao Koong-lian; Chang Hsien-yao
- Preceded by: Chiang Pin-kung
- Succeeded by: Chen Ter-shing (acting); Tien Hung-mao

Secretary-General of the Kuomintang
- In office 1 February 2012 – 27 September 2012
- Chairman: Ma Ying-jeou
- Preceded by: Liao Liou-yi
- Succeeded by: Tseng Yung-chuan

Secretary-General of Executive Yuan
- In office 10 September 2009 – 5 February 2012
- Premier: Wu Den-yih
- Preceded by: Hsueh Hsiang-chuan
- Succeeded by: Lin Yi-shih

Political Deputy Minister of the Interior
- In office 9 March 2009 – 10 September 2009
- Minister: Liao Liou-yi

Deputy Mayor of Kaohsiung
- In office 1995–1998
- Mayor: Wu Den-yih

Personal details
- Born: 17 December 1944 (age 81) Taiwan, Empire of Japan
- Party: Kuomintang
- Education: National Chengchi University (BA)

Lin Join-sane (Chinese: 林中森; pinyin: Lín Zhōngsēn; born 17 December 1944) is a Taiwanese politician. He was the chairman of the Straits Exchange Foundation from 27 September 2012 until 20 May 2016.

== KMT Secretary-General ==
Lin served as the Secretary-General of the Kuomintang from February to September 2012.

=== Yu Chang Biologics Co. Case ===
In August 2012, commenting on the Yu Chang Biologics Co. case regarding former Democratic Progressive Party Chairperson Tsai Ing-wen's illicit transaction related to the funding of the company and that Tsai fought back by filing criminal charges towards Vice President Wu Den-yih, Lin responded by saying that officials involved in the case had clarified themselves and said that KMT respected the prosecutor's decision not to indict Tsai. Lin called on her not to divert public attention and should take moral responsibility.

== SEF chairmanship ==
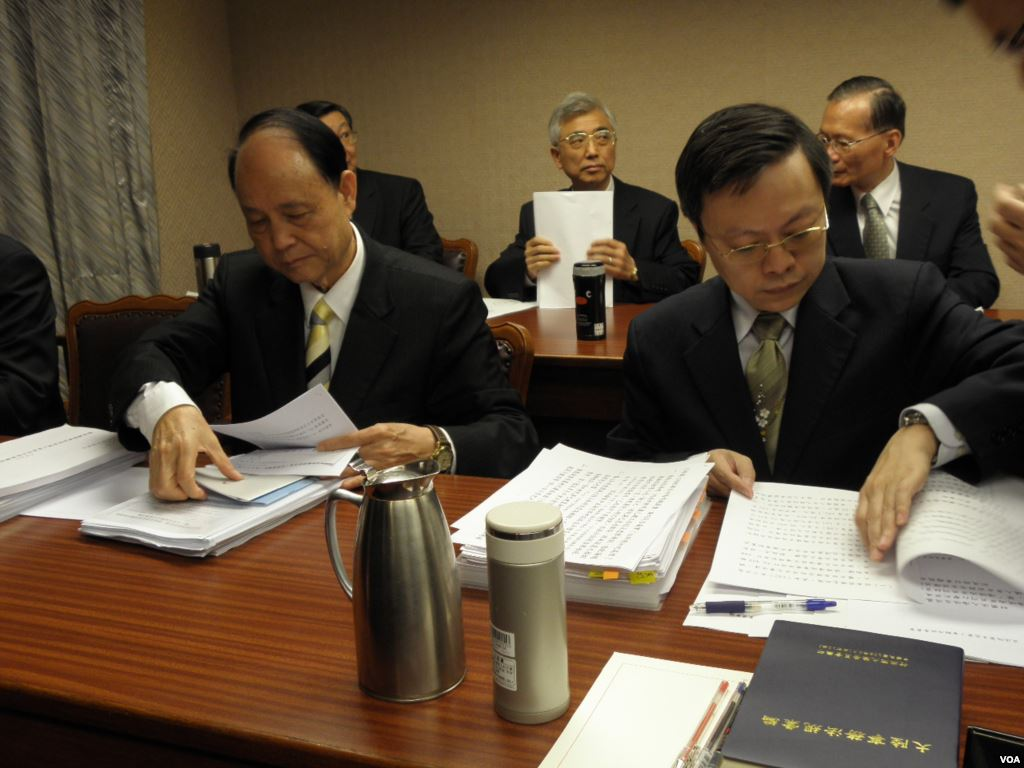
Lin Join-sane and Wang Yu-chi

=== First mainland China visit ===
In mid of October 2012, Lin visited mainland China for the very first time. While in the mainland, he met with Wang Yi (director of Taiwan Affairs Office), Chen Yunlin (president of ARATS) and also Taiwanese business people based in Beijing and Tianjin. During this visit, he has agreed with the Association for Relations Across the Taiwan Straits (ARATS) counterparts to open reciprocal representative offices on both sides of the Taiwan Strait, although no time table has been put in place.

Besides Beijing, Lin also visited Wudang Mountains in Hubei, Shanghai and Kunshan in Jiangsu.

=== Kaohsiung Huoshan Bridge reopening ===
In end of October 2012, Lin witnessed the reopening ceremony of the previously damaged Huoshan Bridge in Kaohsiung due to the Typhoon Morakot in August 2009. Lin was accompanied by Vice President of ARATS Zheng Lizong, Taiwan Mazu Fellowship honorary chairman Yen Chin-piao, Morakot Post-Disaster Reconstruction Council chief executive Chern Jenn-chuan and Kaohsiung Deputy Mayor Liu Shih-fang. The bridge was rebuilt with the help by donors from funds raised by ARATS and Taiwan Affairs Office.

=== New PRC passport ===
After the issuance of new version of PRC passport in May 2012 which features Taiwan's iconic landmark of Sun Moon Lake and Chingshui Cliff, Lin said that he had told ARATS President that Taiwan has taken a firm stance on the matter. ARATS responded by expressing their understanding and promised to handle the matter seriously, Lin added. The passport is actually not the official passport and the changes were only made based on style consideration without any motive behind it.

=== March 2013 mainland China visit ===
In March 2013, Lin visited the Chinese provinces of Hunan and Hubei. He met with Xu Shousheng, Chinese Communist Party Committee Secretary of Hunan. Lin hoped that Taiwan and Hunan can develop a competitive and cooperative relationship. In Hunan, Lin also met with Taiwanese businessmen doing business there. He conducted inspections in Changsha, Zhuzhou and Yueyang. He said that Hunan has attracted investment from more than 2,000 Taiwan-funded enterprises, with six industrial parks and one farmer's innovation park have been established in Xiangtan, Hengyang, Chenzhou and Yueyang. He also attended the inauguration ceremony of the Taiwan Businessmen Association of Yueyang.

=== Chinese mainland investment ===
In mid April 2013, Lin made a remark during an opening ceremony of a Xiamen subsidiary company in Taiwan saying that Taiwan welcomes investors from mainland China to invest in Taiwan because Taiwan has a good environment for investment. Lin also said that he looks forward for the ECFA signing of service trade pact since it will benefit the service industry of both sides across the Taiwan Strait.

=== Chen Yunlin visit to Taiwan ===
In early May 2013, former President of Association for Relations Across the Taiwan Straits (ARATS) Chen Yunlin made a private visit to Taiwan after his term in ARATS has finished. In Taiwan, he met and had a talk with Lin.

=== 2013 cross-strait service trade agreement ===
In end of June 2013, Lin led a delegation from Taiwan to visit Shanghai for the Cross-Strait Service Trade Agreement signing. The Taiwanese delegation includes Kao Koong-lian, Vice Chairman and Secretary-General of Straits Exchange Foundation, Chang Hsien-yao, Deputy Minister of Mainland Affairs Council and Cho Shih-chao, Vice Minister of Economic Affairs. Lin was greeted by Chen Deming, the new President of ARATS.

The cross-strait service trade agreement was signed on 21 June 2013 which consists of four chapters and twenty four articles. Under the agreement, 64 Taiwanese industries will be opened to investments from Mainland China, ranging from transportation, tourism and traditional Chinese medicine sectors. Meanwhile, 80 industries in Mainland China will be opened to Taiwanese investments, ranging from finance, retail, electronics, publishing and travel sectors.

=== September 2013 mainland China visit ===
In mid September 2013, Lin led a delegation from Taiwan for a visit to mainland China. In the mainland, Lin met with Chinese People's Political Consultative Conference Chairman Yu Zhengsheng. The two sides had a discussion on the right directions both sides must follow to develop the cross-strait relations and jointly promote that the two sides are family. They also agreed to further follow up the Economic Cooperation Framework Agreement and begin negotiation about cultural and educational cooperation.

=== April 2014 mainland China visit ===
In mid April 2014, Lin visited Yunnan and Shandong provinces in mainland China to meet with Taiwanese businessmen doing business in those provinces.

=== May 2014 mainland China visit ===
In end of May 2014, Lin visited Jiangsu city of Nantong for a summit on Taiwanese companies' industrial transformation and improvements with Chen Deming, head of Association for Relations Across the Taiwan Straits. He said that cross-strait relations are in the best shape in six decades and that the two sides must improve their cooperation in service sector. He added that both governments must provide support for the service industries to help them during the transformation phase.

Chen gave a remark that the Taiwanese students should support the Cross-Strait Service Trade Agreement because it could provide many job opportunities for them and that Taiwan could gain momentum for economic growth.
