= Wu Rong-ming =

Taiwanese politician

- 吳容明

12th Vice President of the Examination Yuan
- In office 8 June 2004 – 31 July 2008
- President: Yao Chia-wen
- Preceded by: John Kuan
- Succeeded by: Wu Jin-lin

Minister of the Civil Service
- In office 20 May 2000 – 16 June 2004
- Preceded by: Chiu Chin-yi
- Succeeded by: Chiu Wu-hsien

Minister without portfolio
- In office 27 January 1999 – 15 August 1999

Vice Governor of Taiwan Province
- In office 1994–1998
- Governor: James Soong

Secretary-General of the Examination Yuan
- In office 24 April 1993 – 23 December 1994

Personal details
- Born: 23 December 1943 (age 82) Bokushi, Tōseki, Tainan Prefecture, Taiwan, Empire of Japan (today Puzi, Chiayi County, Taiwan
- Party: People First Party (since 2000); Kuomintang (until 1999)
- Education: Shih Hsin University (BA); National Chung Hsing University (LLB, MA); National Chengchi University (PhD)

Wu Rong-ming (Chinese: 吳容明; pinyin: Wú Róngmíng; born 23 December 1943) is a Taiwanese politician.

After graduating from Shih Hsin University, Wu obtained another bachelor's degree in law and commerce from National Chung Hsing University in 1967. He then earned a master's degree in land administration in 1970 from Chung Hsing University and his Ph.D. in land administration from National Chengchi University in 1990.

In the 1980s, Wu worked in the Taipei City Government. From 1993 to 1994, he was secretary-general of the Examination Yuan. Wu was close to James Soong, whom he served under as vice governor of Taiwan Province from 1994 to 1998. The Kuomintang chose to expel Soong in 1999 for running an independent presidential campaign. Wu, who had resigned his position as minister without portfolio to become Soong's campaign manager, had his party membership rescinded. After Chen Shui-bian won the presidential election, it was reported that Wu had Premier Tang Fei's support to lead the Ministry of the Interior. Instead, Wu was officially named minister without portfolio for the second time and led the Ministry of Civil Service under the purview of the Examination Yuan. Wu was appointed as Vice President of the Examination Yuan in May 2004, and confirmed to the office in June. On 1 September 2008, Wu became chairman of Taiwan Sugar Corporation. He resigned the position on 14 November, because he was opposed to the appointment of Chen Ching-bin as company president. Wu was succeeded by Hu Mao-lin.
