= Secretary-General of the Kuomintang =

Chief of staff of the Kuomintang

Secretary-General of the Central Committee of the Kuomintang
- 中國國民黨中央委員會秘書長
- Emblem of the Kuomintang

- Flag of the Kuomintang
- Incumbent; Lee Chien-lung since November 1, 2025
- Central Committee of the Kuomintang
- Formation: 1926; 100 years ago

The secretary-general of the Central Committee of the Kuomintang is the chief of staff of the Kuomintang, nominated by the chairperson and confirmed by the Central Committee. The position was created in 1926 and is currently held on by Lee Chien-lung, who assumed the post in 2025

== List of secretaries-general ==
=== Secretaries-general of the Central Executive Committee ===
1. Yeh Ch'u-ts'ang [葉楚傖] (1926–1927)
2. Post abolished (1927–1929)
3. Chen Li-fu (1929–1931)
4. Ting Wei-feng [丁惟汾] (1931)
5. Yeh Ch'u-ts'ang (1931–1938)
6. Chu Chia-hua (1938–1939)
7. Yeh Ch'u-ts'ang (1939–1941)
8. Wu Tiecheng (1941–1948)
9. Zheng Yanfen (1948–1950)

=== Secretaries-general of the Central Reform Committee ===
1. Chang Chi-yun (1950–1952)

=== Secretaries-general of the Central Committee ===
1. Chang Chi-yun (1952–1954)
2. Chang Li-sheng (1954–1959)
3. Tang Tsung [唐縱] (1959–1964)
4. Gu Fengxiang [谷鳳翔] (1964–1968)
5. Chang Pao-shu [張寶樹] (1968–1979)
6. Chiang Yen-si [蔣彥士] (1979–1985)
7. Ma Shu-li [馬樹禮] (1985–1987)
8. Lee Huan (1987–1989)
9. James Soong Chu-yu (1989–1993)
10. Hsu Shui-teh (1993–1996)
11. Wu Po-hsiung (1996–1997)
12. Chang Hsiao-yen (1997–1999)
13. Huang Kun-huei (1999–2000)
14. Lin Fong-cheng (2000–2005)
15. Chan Chun-po (2005–2007)(2009)
16. Wu Den-yih (2007–2009)
17. King Pu-tsung (2009–2011)
18. Liao Liou-yi (2011–2012)
19. Lin Join-sane (2012)
20. Tseng Yung-chuan (2012–2014)
21. Hung Hsiu-chu (2014–2015 acting)
22. Lee Shu-chuan (2015–9 May 2016)
23. Mo Tien-hu [莫天虎] (9 May 2016 – 20 August 2017)
24. Tseng Yung-chuan (20 August 2017 – 15 January 2020)
  1. Tseng Ming-chung (15 January 2020 – 18 March 2020 acting)
25. Lee Chien-lung (18 March 2020 – 30 October 2021)
26. Justin Huang (30 October 2021 - 1 November 2025)
27. Lee Chien-lung (since 1 November 2025)

== See also ==
- List of leaders of the Kuomintang
- List of leaders of the Democratic Progressive Party
- List of secretaries-general of the Democratic Progressive Party
- List of general secretaries and chairmen of the Chinese Communist Party
