= Liao Liou-yi =

Taiwanese politician

- 廖了以
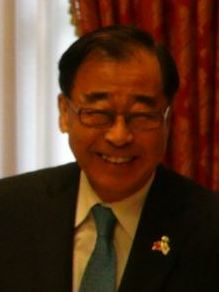

President of the Association of East Asian Relations
- Incumbent
- Assumed office 10 February 2012
- Preceded by: Peng Rongci

Secretary-General of the Kuomintang
- In office 31 January 2011 – 31 January 2012
- Deputy: Hung Hsiu-chu
- Chairman: Ma Ying-jeou
- Preceded by: King Pu-tsung
- Succeeded by: Lin Join-sane

Secretary-General to the President
- In office 10 September 2009 – 31 January 2011
- President: Ma Ying-jeou
- Preceded by: Chan Chun-po
- Succeeded by: Wu Jin-lin

Minister of the Interior
- In office 20 May 2008 – 10 September 2009
- Deputy: Lin Join-sane
- Preceded by: Lee I-yang
- Succeeded by: Jiang Yi-huah

Magistrate of Taichung County
- In office 20 December 1989 – 20 December 1997
- Preceded by: Chen Keng-chin
- Succeeded by: Liao Yung-lai

Personal details
- Born: October 29, 1947 (age 77) Taichung, Taiwan
- Political party: Kuomintang
- Education: Feng Chia University (BS)

Liao Liou-yi (Chinese: 廖了以; pinyin: Liào Liǎoyǐ; born 29 October 1947) is a Taiwanese politician. He served as secretary-general of the Presidential Office, interior minister and secretary-general of the Kuomintang.

He was a president of Association of East Asian Relations from February 2012 to 2013. He signed a fishing rights accord for waters near Senkaku Islands on behalf of Taiwan in April 2013. He tendered his resignation as head of the Association of East Asian Relations in May 2013.

== Personal life ==
He was born to a Japanese mother and a Taiwanese father in 1947. He graduated from the Department of Statistics of Feng Chia University. He is a father of three daughters.
