= Shao Yu-ming =

Taiwanese politician (1938–2026)

- 邵玉銘

Director-General of the Government Information Office
- In office 22 April 1987 – 20 September 1991
- Preceded by: Chang King-yuh
- Succeeded by: Jason Hu

Personal details
- Born: 3 November 1938 Binjiang Province, Manchukuo
- Died: 7 February 2026 (aged 87) Taipei, Taiwan
- Party: Kuomintang
- Education: National Chengchi University (BA); Tufts University (MA); University of Chicago (PhD)
- Occupation: Historian

Shao Yu-ming (Chinese: 邵玉銘; 3 November 1938 – 7 February 2026) was a Taiwanese politician.

== Life and career ==
Shao was born on 3 November 1938 in what was then Manchukuo's Binjiang Province. He moved to Taiwan in 1948, reuniting with his parents. Shao earned a bachelor's degree from the Department of Diplomacy at National Chengchi University, completed a master's degree at the Fletcher School of Law and Diplomacy at Tufts University, then obtained a PhD in history at the University of Chicago, where he specialized in Chinese history. While attending UChicago, Shao participated in a protest about the Senkaku Islands dispute, and met Jason Hu for the first time, a fellow member of the Kuomintang who would later succeed him at the Government Information Office. Upon returning to Taiwan in 1982, Shao began teaching at NCCU. Through 2012, Shao continued to hold a professorship at his alma mater.

He served as director-general of the Government Information Office from 1987 to 1991. During his tenure, the first GIO emblem was designed. It featured a map of China and the flag of the Republic of China, and remained in use from 1988 through 2001. The Taiwanese government lifted restrictions on civilian travel to China, then Shao's GIO eased similar limitations on people employed by mass media outlets. Shao later told Chiu Fu-sheng, the producer of the film A City of Sadness (1989) that approving the film nearly caused Shao's firing from the GIO.

In the early 2000s Shao served as chairman of the Central Daily News. He left the post in 2003, when a merger with the China Daily News was underway. Around the same time, Shao was also the Kuomintang's deputy secretary general. By 2003, Shao had stepped down as deputy secretary general, but retained his seat on the Central Committee. He was a member of the Straits Exchange Foundation until late 2002. In 2005, Shao was considered for a vacancy on the National Communications Commission. He later chaired the Coordination Council for North American Affairs.

In July 2013, Shao was elected chair of the Public Television Service. At the time, PTS board meetings had been delayed for two and a half years as the Ministry of Culture struggled to fill vacant board seats. In November of the same year, TBS Dispatch Workers' Union began protesting to draw attention to the fact that PTS classified a fifth of its workforce as temporary employees, and demand that Shao formally place those employees on payroll. On 22 December 2013, Shao attended a mass media forum in China, alongside Central News Agency president Chen Kuo-hsiang and over 70 other media professionals. Chen and Shao were sharply criticized by members of the Legislative Yuan affiliated with the Democratic Progressive Party. Following the Sunflower Student Movement, Shao promised to investigate programing alterations made by PTS on 31 March 2014, which resulted in a reduction of protest-related coverage as the protest was live. In 2015, Chinese Television System seated Shao to a task force responsible for managing the station's debt. In 2016, Shao vowed that detailed content moderation guidelines would be developed and implemented on PTS's citizen journalism platform PeoPo, after a PeoPo community member posted video of herself insulting elderly waishengren.

Shao died in Taipei on 7 February 2026, at the age of 87. He was married to Chin Hsiu-li, a member of the board of directors for the Republic of China chapter of the Asociación Mundial de Mujeres Periodistas y Escritoras.
