= Hsu Cheng-kuang =

Taiwanese sociologist

- 徐正光

Minister of Mongolian and Tibetan Affairs Commission of the Republic of China
- In office 20 May 2000 – January 2002
- Preceded by: Kao Koong-lian
- Succeeded by: Hsu Chih-hsiung

Personal details
- Born: 16 February 1943 (age 83)
- Education: National Taiwan University (BA); University of Illinois Urbana-Champaign (MA); Brown University (PhD)

Hsu Cheng-kuang (Chinese: 徐正光; pinyin: Xú Zhèngguāng; born 16 February 1943) is a Taiwanese sociologist. He was the Minister of the Mongolian and Tibetan Affairs Commission (MTAC) of the Executive Yuan in 2000–2002.

== Education ==
Hsu graduated from National Taiwan University with a Bachelor of Arts in sociology in 1965. Hsu then was awarded a scholarship by the Ministry of Education to pursue graduate studies in the United States, where he earned a Master of Arts in sociology from University of Illinois Urbana-Champaign in 1972 and his Ph.D. in sociology from Brown University in 1981. His doctoral dissertation, completed under Professor Robert M. Marsh, was titled, "Foreign interests, state and gentry-merchant class: railway development in early modern China, 1895-1911".

== MTAC Ministry ==
=== Dalai Lama visit to Taiwan ===
Commenting on the upcoming visit by Dalai Lama Tenzin Gyatso to Taiwan in October 2000, Hsu said that the visit will be in his capacity of a noted international religious leader at the invitation of a local civilian organization. He added that the MTAC would concentrate on cultural, economic and academic exchanges affairs rather than political affairs towards Tibet.

=== ROC-CTA relations ===
In April 2001, Hsu said that the ROC government would improve relations with the Central Tibetan Administration (CTA) government despite the fact that Tibet is still technically part of the Republic of China. Although there have been many misunderstandings between ROC and CTA due to history and lack of proper channel between the two sides, Hsu said that the MTAC would improve contact with the CTA and provide services to the Tibetan people in the ground of humanitarianism.

== See also ==
- Mongolian and Tibetan Affairs Commission
- Republic of China–Mongolia relations
- Executive Yuan
