= Wu Jin-lin =

Politician of Taiwan

- 伍錦霖
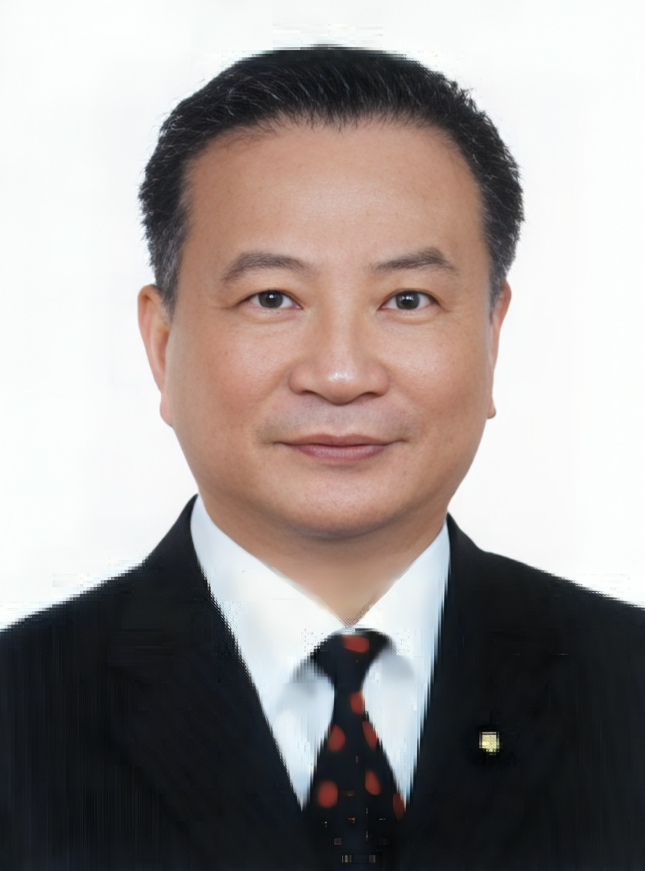
- Official portrait, 2014

12th President of the Examination Yuan
- In office 1 September 2014 – 1 September 2020
- Appointed by: Ma Ying-jeou
- Vice President: Kao Yuang-kuang; Lee I-yang
- Preceded by: John Kuan
- Succeeded by: Huang Jong-tsun
- Acting; 1 September 2008 – 18 November 2008
- Preceded by: Yao Chia-wen
- Succeeded by: John Kuan

13th Vice President of the Examination Yuan
- In office 13 April 2012 – 31 August 2014
- President: John Kuan
- Preceded by: Vacant (Note: This office was vacant during his tenure as Secretary-General of the Presidential Office, he returned as Vice President of Examination Yuan after he resign as Secretary-General.)
- Succeeded by: Kao Yuang-kuang
- In office 1 September 2008 – 30 January 2011
- Preceded by: Himself (acting); Wu Rong-ming
- Succeeded by: Vacant

29th Secretary-General to the President
- In office 1 February 2011 – 31 January 2012
- President: Ma Ying-jeou
- Preceded by: Liao Liou-yi
- Succeeded by: Tseng Yung-chuan

Member of the Legislative Yuan
- In office 1 February 2005 – 31 January 2008
- Constituency: Pingtung County

Personal details
- Born: 6 October 1947 (age 78) Wandan, Pingtung, Taiwan
- Party: Kuomintang
- Relations: Wu Tse-yuan (brother)
- Education: National Chengchi University (BA, MPA); Yale University (MBA)

Wu Jin-lin (traditional Chinese: 伍錦霖; simplified Chinese: 伍锦霖; pinyin: Wu Jǐnlín; born 6 October 1947) is a Taiwanese politician. He served as the President of the Examination Yuan from 2014 to 2020. He also briefly served as President of the Examination Yuan in 2008.

== Education ==
Wu received his bachelor's and master's degrees in public administration from National Chengchi University. He then studied at Yale University in the United States.
