= Taichung City Constituency 8 =

Constituency of the Legislative Yuan of Taiwan

- Single-member constituency for the Legislative Yuan
- District(s): Fengyuan, Dongshi, Xinshe, Shigang, Heping
- Electorate: 210,595 (2024 election)

Current constituency
- Created: 2008 (as Taichung County Constituency 4); 2010 (current name)
- Party: KMT
- Member: Johnny Chiang

Taichung City Constituency 8 (Chinese: 臺中市第八選舉區) is one of the 73 regional constituencies represented in the Legislative Yuan, the national legislature of Taiwan. It was created in 2008 (as Taichung County Constituency 4) following a series of constitutional reforms, and elects one legislator, through first-past-the-post voting, to the Legislative Yuan. It has been represented by Johnny Chiang of the Kuomintang since 2012.

== Legislators ==
Election	Legislator	Party
2008 - 2011	Shyu Jong-shyong	Kuomintang
2011 - 2012	Vacant (Note: Incumbent resigned to take up the post of Deputy Mayor of Taichung, and as the seat was vacated less than a year before the next scheduled election, no by-election took place)	
2012	Johnny Chiang	Kuomintang

== Election results ==

=== 2008 (Note: Named Taichung County Constituency 4, boundaries unchanged) ===
2008 Taiwanese legislative election: Taichung County 4
Candidate	Party	Votes	%
Shyu Jong-shyong	Kuomintang	68,216	64.00
Kao Chi-tsan	Taiwan Solidarity Union	38,368	36.00
Total		106,584	100.00
Valid votes		106,584	98.11
Invalid/blank votes		2,058	1.89
Total votes		108,642	100.00
Registered voters/turnout		198,098	54.84
Majority		29,848	28
Kuomintang win (new seat)			

=== 2012 ===
2012 Taiwanese legislative election: Taichung 8
Candidate	Party	Votes	%	+/–
Johnny Chiang	Kuomintang	69,136	44.77	▼19.23
Kuo Chun-ming	Democratic Progressive Party	60,964	39.48	NEW
Chen Ching-lung	People First Party	14,789	9.58	NEW
Che Shu-chuan	Independent	8,761	5.67	NEW
Chi Lien-sheng	Independent	770	0.50	NEW
Total		154,420	100.00	–
Valid votes		154,420	98.82	
Invalid/blank votes		1,842	1.18	
Total votes		156,262	100.00	
Registered voters/turnout		203,308	76.86	
Majority		8,172	5.29	
Kuomintang hold				

=== 2016 ===
* denotes the incumbent legislator

2016 Taiwanese legislative election: Taichung 8
Candidate	Party	Votes	%	+/–
Johnny Chiang*	Kuomintang	72,024	49.62	▲4.85
Hsieh Chih-chung	Democratic Progressive Party	70,549	48.60	▲9.12
Wang Cheng-chi	Independent	2,590	1.78	NEW
Total		145,163	100.00	–
Valid votes		145,163	98.59	
Invalid/blank votes		2,081	1.41	
Total votes		147,244	100.00	
Registered voters/turnout			–	
Majority		1,475	1.02	
Kuomintang hold				

=== 2020 ===
* denotes the incumbent legislator

2020 Taiwanese legislative election: Taichung 8
Candidate	Party	Votes	%	+/–
Johnny Chiang*	Kuomintang	94,750	59.03	▲9.41
Weng Mei-chun	Democratic Progressive Party	62,471	38.92	▼9.68
Chu Chih-te	Taiwan Renewal Party	2,614	1.63	NEW
Liu Hsing-lung	Independent	664	0.41	NEW
Total		160,499	100.00	–
Valid votes		160,499	98.43	
Invalid/blank votes		2,560	1.57	
Total votes		163,059	100.00	
Registered voters/turnout		211,362	77.15	
Majority		32,297	20.11	
Kuomintang hold				

=== 2024 ===
* denotes the incumbent legislator

2024 Taiwanese legislative election: Taichung 8
Candidate	Party	Votes	%
Johnny Chiang*	Kuomintang	88,651	57.87
Hsieh Chih-ching	Democratic Progressive Party	64,542	42.13
Total		153,193	100.00
Valid votes		153,193	97.80
Invalid/blank votes		3,442	2.20
Total votes		156,635	100.00
Registered voters/turnout		210,595	74.38
Majority		24,109	15.74
Kuomintang hold			
