= Cross-Straits Common Market Foundation =

Business organization based in Da'an, Taipei, Taiwan

- 兩岸共同市場基金會
- Formation: 26 March 2001
- Type: foundation
- Purpose: promote cross-strait business and trade relations
- Headquarters: Da'an, Taipei
- Location: Taiwan
- Coordinates: 25°01′45″N 121°32′57″E
- Official language: (in Chinese)
- Chairperson: Vincent Siew
- Website: Official website (in Chinese)

The Cross-Straits Common Market Foundation (traditional Chinese: 兩岸共同市場基金會; simplified Chinese: 两岸共同市场基金会; pinyin: Liǎng'àn Gòngtóng Shìchǎng Jījīn Huì) is an organization in Taiwan dealing with cross-strait trading. The office is located at Tunnan Tower, Da'an District, Taipei.

== History ==
The organization was founded on 26 March 2001.

== Objectives ==
- A new position for both sides in the emerging global economy
- Remove controversial political and economic impasses
- Role played by both sides in the new century

== See also ==
- Cross-Strait relations
