= 101st Amphibious Reconnaissance Battalion =

- 中華民國陸軍101兩棲偵察營 (Chinese)
- Active: 1949–present
- Country: Republic of China
- Branch: Republic of China Army
- Type: Special operations forces
- Size: Battalion
- Garrison/HQ: Kinmen
- Nickname: Sea Dragon Frogmen or Frogmen

The 101st Amphibious Reconnaissance Battalion (Chinese: 中華民國陸軍101兩棲偵察營), known also as the Sea Dragon Frogmen, is a special operations unit of the Republic of China Army (ROCA).

Although they, along with the Amphibious Reconnaissance and Patrol Unit, are often compared to the United States Navy SEALs (US Navy SEALs) because of their shared "Frogman" moniker, their role is quite unique being the only known official, relatively high-profile “frogman” unit under the branch of the Army. The closest analogous comparison for the 101st Amphibious Reconnaissance Battalion to their US counterpart would be the combat divers of the United States Army Special Forces (Green Berets) or any other United States Army Special Operations Command (USASOC) soldiers (e.g: 528th Sustainment Brigade, Delta Force, Regimental Reconnaissance Company (RRC)) who have completed the Combat Diver Qualification Course. Along with other Taiwanese special operations forces they are expected to play a key role in any conflict with China especially in regards to irregular warfare and land warfare.

== History ==
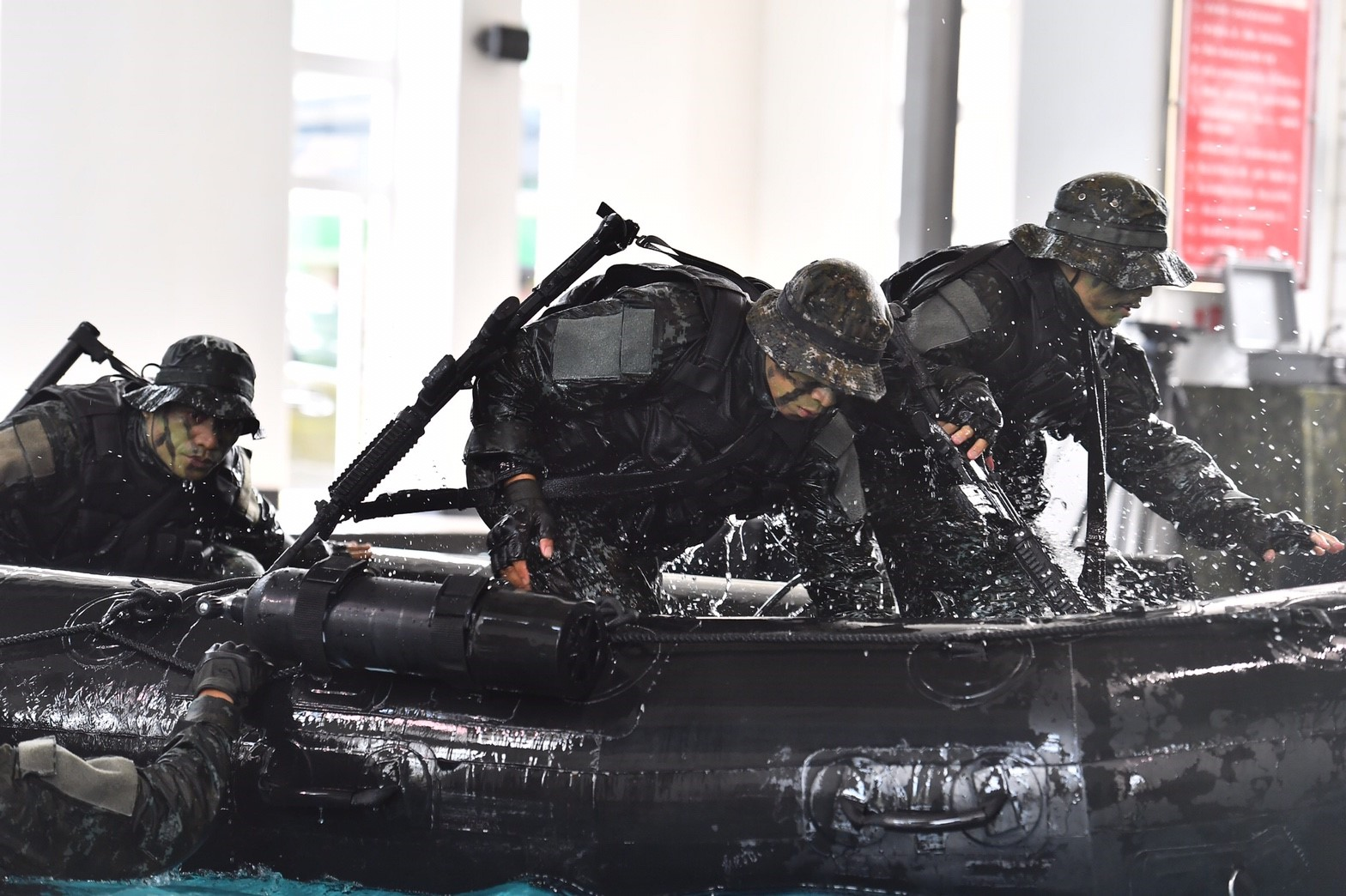
Sea Dragon Frogmen practice small boat drills in an indoor training center

The 101st Amphibious Reconnaissance Battalion was founded in 1949 with American assistance as a special purpose coastal surveillance, infiltration, and clandestine operations unit.

Unit members received a pay raise in 2017.

In 2019 the MoD commenced construction on two new bases on Kinmen and Penghu to support rapid deployments by the 101st.

In 2020 the US Army 1st Special Forces Group (Airborne) released a video which showed themselves training with the 101st Amphibious Reconnaissance Battalion in Taiwan.

== Training ==
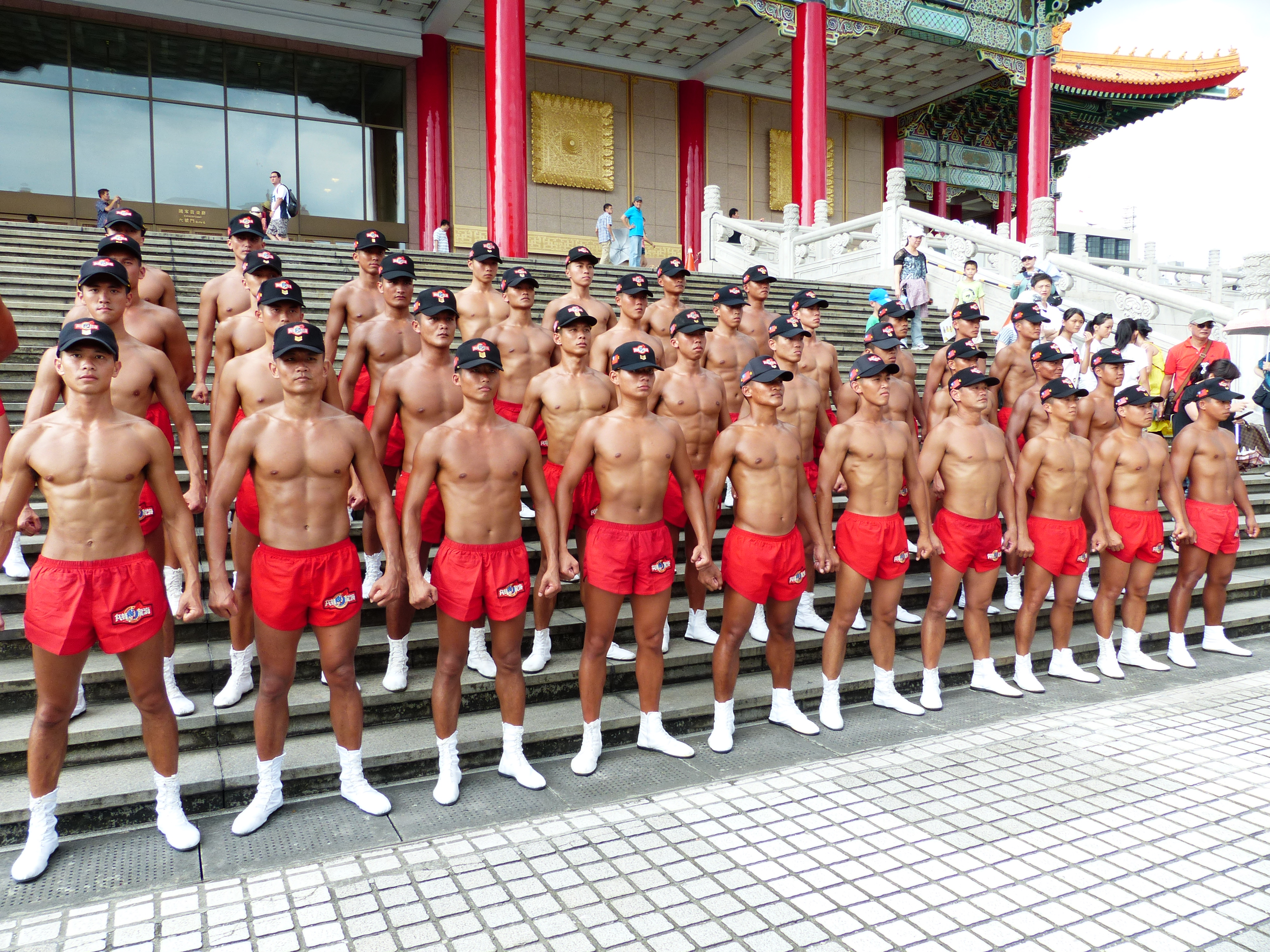
ROCA Frogmen on the stairs of the National Concert Hall

Applicants undergo a 15-week training course known as "the iron-man road" which follows a five-day qualification course. Only twenty percent of applicants make it through training. Inducted recruits receive their unit badge pinned to their bare chest.

== See also ==
- Airborne Special Service Company
- Amphibious Reconnaissance and Patrol Unit
- Republic of China Military Police Special Services Company
- List of military special forces units
