= Shyu Jong-shyong =

Taiwanese politician

Shyu Jong-shyong MLY
- 徐中雄
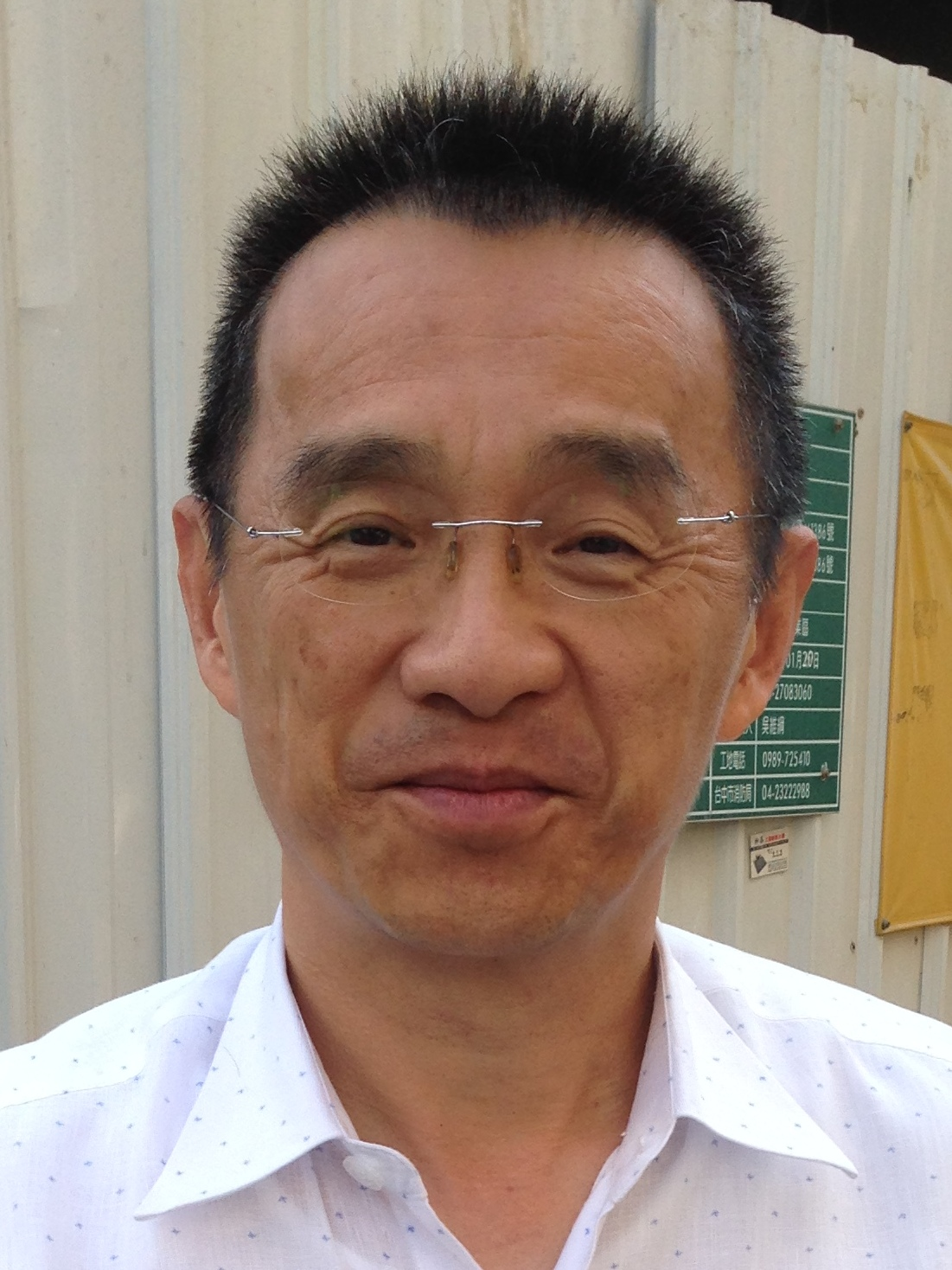

Deputy Secretary-General of the Executive Yuan
- In office 2015 – 20 May 2016
- Secretary-General: Chien Tai-lang
- Succeeded by: Shih Keh-her

Deputy Mayor of Taichung City
- In office 2011–2014
- Mayor: Jason Hu; Lin Chia-lung

Member of Legislative Yuan
- In office 1 February 1993 – 31 January 2012
- Constituency: Taichung County→Taichung 8

Personal details
- Born: 7 October 1957 (age 68) Dongshi, Taichung County, Taiwan
- Party: Kuomintang
- Education: Soochow University (BA); University of Northern Colorado (MA, PhD)

Shyu Jong-shyong (Chinese: 徐中雄; pinyin: Xú Zhōngxióng; born 7 October 1957) is a Taiwanese politician.

== Education ==
Shyu graduated from Soochow University with a bachelor's degree in political science in 1981. He then completed graduate studies in the United States, earning a Master of Arts (M.A.) in 1984 and his Ph.D. in 1988 in special education, both from the University of Northern Colorado.

== Early career ==
After graduation from University of Northern Colorado, Shyu became a specialist under the Department of Social Affairs of Taiwan Provincial Government in 1987–1988. In 1988-1991 he became an associate researcher at the Taiwan Secondary Education Teachers Training Center and in 1991-1993 he became an associate professor at the Department of Special Education of National Taichung Teacher's College.

== Political career ==
Shyu served on the Legislative Yuan from 1993 to 2011, and was the first member of a legislature entirely elected by residents of the Taiwan Area to have a disability. He resigned from the legislature to serve as deputy mayor of Taichung between 2011 and 2014, and subsequently served as deputy secretary-general of the Executive Yuan in 2015–2016.
