= Chiu Fu-sheng =

Taiwanese film producer and real estate developer

- Traditional Chinese: 邱復生
- Simplified Chinese: 邱复生
Transcriptions
Standard Mandarin
- Hanyu Pinyin: Qiū Fùshēng

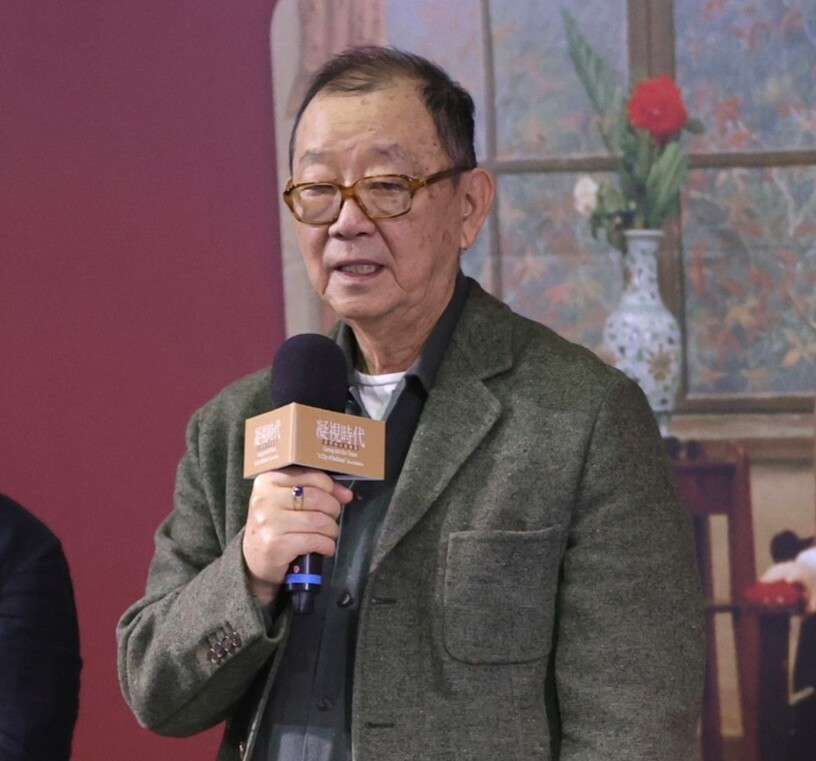
Chiu Fu-sheng

Chiu Fu-sheng (Chinese: 邱復生; born 19 July 1947) is a Taiwanese film producer and real estate developer.

== Life and career ==
Born in Pingtung County in 1947, Chiu is of Hakka descent. He attended the Political Warfare Cadres Academy. Chiu began his career in media as an advertiser in the 1970s before founding Era Communications, which began as a video and independent film distribution company in 1982.

After returning from a business trip to the 1988 Cannes Film Festival, Chiu wondered why Taiwanese films were not featured at international awards shows. He found that Taiwanese filmmaking lacked several widely used technologies and techniques, such as synchronous recording, optical printing, and layered audio. Through Era, Chiu produced Hou Hsiao-hsien's 1989 film A City of Sadness. During post-production, Chiu sent the film to Japan, where he made two copies. One returned to Taiwan for review by the Government Information Office and the other was sent to the Venice Film Festival.

Martial law had been lifted two years ago prior to the film's release, but the depiction of the 228 Incident in A City of Sadness still caused controversy within the Kuomintang-dominated government, which believed that Chiu had broken the law in sending the film out of the country. Its eventual approval by the GIO nearly resulted in the firing of office director Shao Yu-ming.

In 1991, Chiu produced Raise the Red Lantern directed by Zhang Yimou. Raise the Red Lantern won the BAFTA Award for Best Film Not in the English Language and was nominated for the Australian Film Institute Award for Best Foreign Film in 1993. He then co-produced Hou Hsiao-hsien's The Puppetmaster (1993) before Zhang's 1994 film To Live. To Live earned Zhang and Chiu a second BAFTA Award in 1995. TVBS was founded in 1993 and Chiu was elected the company's first chairman. The joint venture between Shaw Brothers Studio's TVB and Era remained under Chiu's leadership until 2003, though Chiu began focusing on Era Television in 1998. Because TVBS lost the television broadcast rights to Chinese Professional Baseball League games, Chiu founded Taiwan Major League in 1996. The four-team TML were consolidated into the CPBL in 2003. Chiu divested from TVBS in 2005.

Chiu left Era in 2008 and became a real estate developer, chairing the Taiwan Land Development Corporation. The TLDC has several developments in Hualien, including "Sunrise Village," a group of environmentally friendly homes, and "Huallywood," a project dedicated to the Taiwanese film industry, reminiscent of Hollywood, California. Elsewhere in Taiwan, TLDC operated developments in Hsinchu, Kinmen, and Nantou under Chiu's leadership. The TLDC has also researched the possibility of investment in other countries, namely Vietnam.

== Personal life ==
Chiu Fu-sheng's daughter Vicki Chiu served as deputy minister of culture in the Ma Ying-jeou presidential administration from January to October 2015.
