= Wu Tse-yuan =

Taiwanese politician

Wu Tse-yuan MLY
- 伍澤元
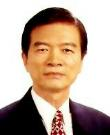

Member of the Legislative Yuan
- In office 1 February 1999 – 29 December 2001
- Constituency: Pingtung County

Pingtung County Magistrate
- In office 20 December 1993 – 14 October 1997
- Preceded by: Su Tseng-chang
- Succeeded by: Chang Man-chuan (acting); Su Jia-chyuan

Member of the National Assembly
- In office 1992–1996

Personal details
- Born: 17 August 1945 Takao Prefecture, Taiwan, Empire of Japan
- Died: 22 September 2008 (aged 63) Shanghai, China
- Party: Independent (after 1998); Kuomintang (until 1998)
- Relations: Wu Jin-lin (brother)
- Education: Central Police University (BA); National Chiao Tung University (MS); Chinese Culture University (PhD); University College London (MSc)

Wu Tse-yuan (Chinese: 伍澤元; pinyin: Wǔ Zéyuán; 17 August 1945 – 22 September 2008) was a Taiwanese politician and engineer known for his involvement in black gold politics and ties to gangs.

== Education ==
After graduating from National Pingtung Senior High School, Wu studied criminology at Central Police University and obtained his bachelor's degree in 1971. He then earned a master's degree in transportation engineering from National Chiao Tung University in 1979 and his Ph.D. in urban planning and architecture from Chinese Culture University in 1986. His doctoral dissertation was titled, "A study of the implementation performance of China's current housing policy" (我國現行住宅政策執行績效之研究). He later completed graduate studies in England, where he studied construction at The Bartlett Faculty of the Built Environment of University College London.

== Political career ==
A protégé of Lee Teng-hui, Wu was also close to Wang Jin-pyng and Lien Chan. As leader of the Taiwan Provincial Planning and Developing Department from 1988 to 1992, Wu began taking kickbacks from a company installing water pumps in Banqiao District. He contested the 1993 local elections as a Kuomintang candidate for the magistracy of Pingtung County and won reelection in 1997. Wu was indicted in 1996 for his actions in Banqiao, but not detained until a 1997 court order and had been released on medical parole in 1998. Later that year, local media reported Wu's expulsion from the Kuomintang. He gained legal immunity in December via his election to the Legislative Yuan, as a representative for Pingtung County. In January 2000, Wu Tse-yuan and Lien Chan were accused of land speculation in Wuqi, Taichung, dating back to 1993. On 30 November 2000, the Taiwan High Court sentenced Wu to fifteen years imprisonment for the Banqiao corruption case. A week later, the Executive Yuan proposed an amendment to the Public Officials Election and Recall Law targeting Wu and other politicians involved with black gold politics. The amendment sought to bar anyone serving a suspended sentence, a sentence longer than ten years imprisonment, or a death sentence from seeking public office. In addition, convicted racketeers released within ten years of an election would also be illegible for that election cycle. In March 2001, Wu was indicted in another corruption scandal involving the Pali Sewage Treatment Plant. He, Lo Fu-chu, and other legislators planned on founding a new political group affiliated with Lee Teng-hui in 2001, but the proposal was postponed that July. Wu left for Japan on 29 December 2001 as part of a junket, and never returned to Taiwan. He was tracked to Guangzhou some time later.

In 2004, Taiwan Pineapple Group executive Huang Tsung-hung claimed that he bribed Wu in 1999 and asked Wu to help him secure a loan for his company.

== Personal life ==
Wu Jin-lin is his younger brother. The younger Wu ran for a Pingtung County seat in the legislative elections of 2004, and won. The Apple Daily was the first Taiwanese publication to report Wu Tse-yuan's death in September 2008, but immediately afterward, both Wu Jin-lin and the Ministry of Justice refused to confirm media reports.
