= Feng Chia University =

Private research university in Taichung, Taiwan

Coordinates: 24.1794°N 120.6500°E

- 逢甲大學 (Chinese)
- Former names: Feng Chia College of Engineering and Business (1961–1980)
- Motto: 忠勤誠篤
- Motto in English: Loyalty, diligence, sincerity and perseverance
- Type: Private
- Established: 1961; 65 years ago
- Affiliations: AACSB; TBFA
- President: Wang Wei 王葳
- Academic staff: 873 (2025)
- Students: 20,114 (2025)
- Location: Xitun District, Taichung, Taiwan
- Campus: Urban
- Colors: Burgundy
- Website: www.fcu.edu.tw

Chinese name
- Traditional Chinese: 逢甲大學
- Simplified Chinese: 逢甲大学
Transcriptions
Standard Mandarin
- Hanyu Pinyin: Féngjiǎ Dàxué
- Tongyong Pinyin: Tung-oo Tàhsué
Southern Min
- Hokkien POJ: Hông-kap Tāi-ha̍k

Feng Chia University (FCU; Chinese: 逢甲大學; pinyin: Féngjiǎ Dàxué) is a private research university in Taichung, Taiwan. Founded in 1961 as an engineering and business college, it gained university status in 1980.

Feng Chia hosts bachelor's, master's, and doctoral degree programs, enrolling over 20,000 total students. The university is a member of the Tsinghua Big Five Alliance of institutions dedicated to scientific research supported by the National Science and Technology Council. It also has partnerships with Purdue University, RMIT University, the University of Zaragoza, and San Jose State University.

== History ==
Feng Chia University was founded in 1961 by intellectuals Chiu Nien-tai, Hsiao I-shan and Yang Liang-kung. It was originally named the "Feng Chia College of Engineering and Business" and was located in the Beitun District of Taichung City. It was accredited by the Ministry of Education on July 5, 1961, with two departments: Engineering (civil engineering and hydraulic engineering) and Commerce (accounting and business administration). Classes began on November 15, 1961, with an initial enrollment of 221 students. Its namesake is Taiwanese poet and educator Qiu Fengjia, one of the leaders of the military resistance against the Japanese invasion of Taiwan in 1895.

The establishment of the university contributed to a student enrollment boom in Taichung, gave rise to a prominent business circle in the area, and led to the founding of the Fengjia Night Market. In 1963, the university was moved to its current location in Xitun District in Taichung. The school was granted university status in 1980 and assumed its present name.

In 2008, the APEC Research Center for Advanced Biohydrogen Technology was established on the FCU campus. In 2009, the Open Geospatial Consortium (OGC) designated the Geographic Information Systems Research Center as the Asian standards testing center with one of 20 official principal members.

== Academics ==
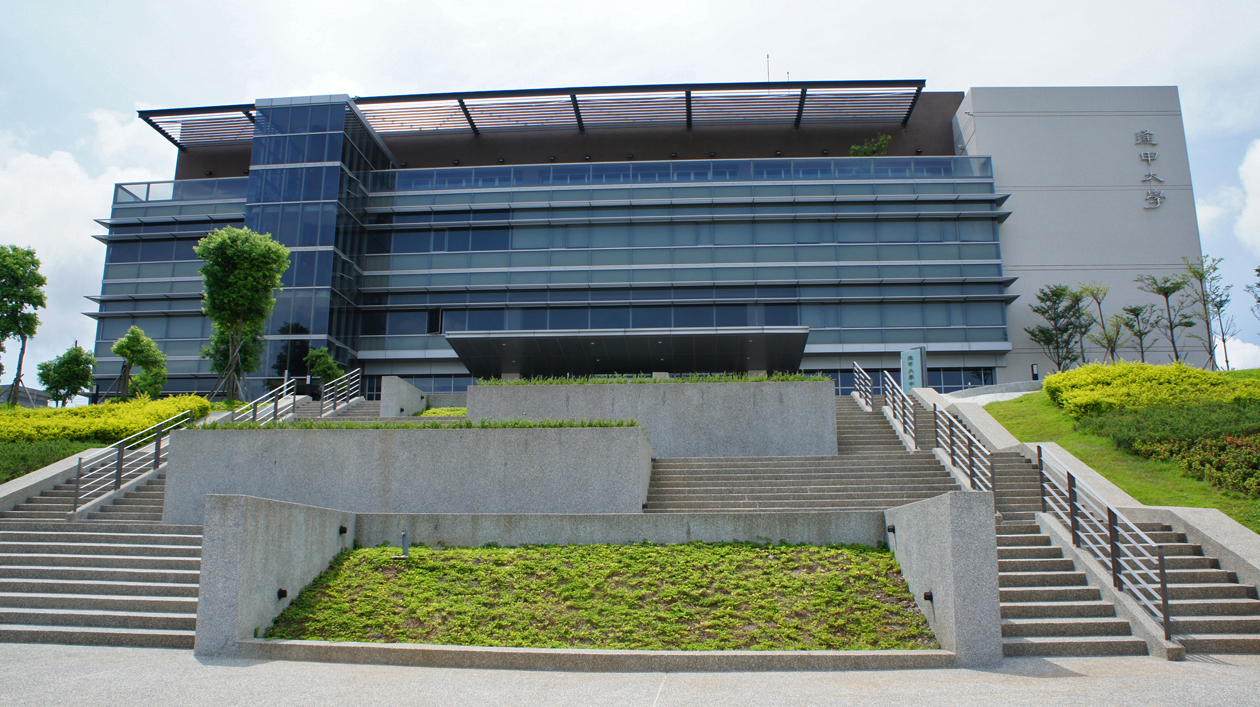
FCU Science Center

Feng Chia enrolls a total of over 20,000 students in undergraduate, master's, and doctoral degree programs which collectively have about 2,200 faculty and staff. The university consists of eight colleges: Engineering, Business, Science, Humanities and Social Sciences, Information Engineering, Construction, Business Administration, and Finance. It further houses 33 academic departments, four separate graduate schools, and three separate doctoral degree programs. In total, the university offers 57 bachelor's degrees, 76 master's degrees, and 14 doctoral degrees.

There are 37 specialized research centers on campus, including the Green Energy Development Center, Geographic Information Systems Research Center, Construction and Disaster Prevention Research Center, Information and Communication Security Research Center, and the Center for Tang Dynasty Culture.

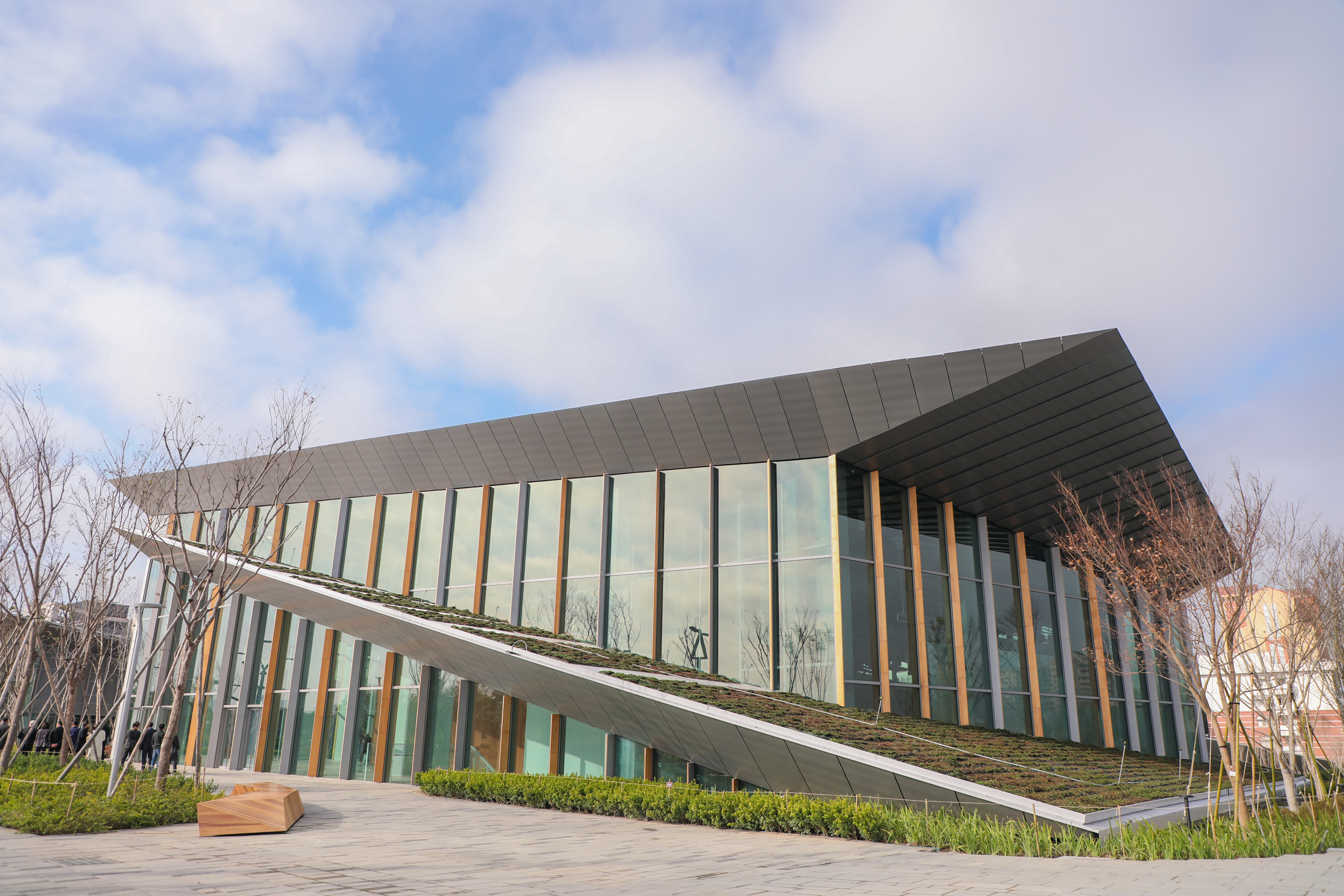
Gongshan Hall was opened on February 16, 2025, and houses the university's largest lecture hall. It was designed by Japanese architect Kengo Kuma.

FCU is the third university in Taiwan to complete and receive marks of excellence on five National Science Council technology transfer projects. In March 2017, Apple established Taiwan's first Apple Regional Training Center at FCU, which makes FCU the only university in Taiwan authorized to conduct Apple-certified training courses.

In 2024, the FCU International School of Technology and Management began a partnership program with Australian Maritime College and the University of Tasmania to offer the Bachelor of Global Logistics and Maritime Management.

== Rankings ==
Feng Chia University rankings

Global – Overall
- QS World: 1201–1400 (2024)
- THE World: 1501+ (2023)

Regional – Overall
- QS Asia: =324 (2025)
- THE Asia: 501–600 (2024)

National – Overall
- THE National: 30–43 (2023)

In 2012, FCU was ranked among the top 100 global "Emerging" universities in a survey published in the UK's the Times Higher Education Supplement. In 2013, FCU was ranked among Asia's top 100 universities by The Times Higher Education Supplement.

In 2014, FCU was rated in the top 100 in the Times Higher Education World University Rankings (BRICS and Emerging Economies Ranking). FCU was ranked 153rd among the Asia University Rankings by the Quacquarelli Symonds. The individual subject world rankings from QS put FCU at 106th in Accounting & Finance.

In 2015, Feng Chia University ranked ninth in Taiwan and 78th in Asia in the QS World University Rankings by Subject 2015 - Computer Science & Information Systems. In 2016, FCU was honored with a number one ranking in the Ministry of Education's Program for Promoting Teaching Excellence.

In 2017, FCU was ranked as the top private comprehensive university in Taiwan by the Times Higher Education "Best Universities in the Asia-Pacific Region 2017."

== Notable alumni ==
Feng Chia University has graduated over 150,000 alumni, and has established international alumni chapters across several countries.

- Amanda Chou, actress
- Yu Cheng-hsien, politician
- Hsu Shu-hua, member of Legislative Yuan
- Liao Liou-yi, minister of the Interior (2008–2009)
- Ma Wen-chun, member of Legislative Yuan
- Phil Chang, singer
- Tseng Yung-chuan, secretary-general of the ROC Presidential Office (2015–2016)
- Wu Hong-mo, minister of Public Construction Commission (2018)
- Tsai Huang-liang, member of the Legislative Yuan
- Kao Meng-ting, member of the Legislative Yuan
- Mei-Ling Shyu, computer scientist
- Liu Wen-chung, scientist

== See also ==
- Tsinghua Big Five Alliance
- List of universities in Taiwan
