= Lin Rong-te =

Taiwanese businessman and politician

- 林榮德

Chairman of the Kuomintang Acting
- In office 15 January 2020 – 9 March 2020
- Preceded by: Wu Den-yih
- Succeeded by: Johnny Chiang

Personal details
- Born: 6 October 1959 (age 65) Hsinchu City, Taiwan
- Education: University of the West (BA); National Chengchi University (MBA)

Lin Rong-te (Chinese: 林榮德; pinyin: Lín Róngdé; born 6 October 1959) is a Taiwanese politician.

== Life and career ==
Lin was born on 6 October 1959, in Hsinchu City, Taiwan. He earned a bachelor's degree in business administration from the University of the West, then received a Master of Business Administration (M.B.A.) degree from National Chengchi University.

Lin was a member of the third National Assembly. Lin later served on the Central Standing Committee of the Kuomintang. He was supportive of Wang Jin-pyng during the September strife of 2013, during which party chair Ma Ying-jeou attempted to revoke Wang's party membership, and continued to back Wang as he pursued legal action. Lin was a candidate for the 2016 Kuomintang chairmanship election, but dropped out before the vote took place. He became acting chair of the Kuomintang on 15 January 2020, after Wu Den-yih resigned the office on the same date, in an effort to take responsibility for Han Kuo-yu's loss in the 2020 Taiwanese presidential election.

Lin's business ties in China include a period as leader of the Kunshan taishang business association, and as an adviser to the Association of Taiwan Investment Enterprises on the Mainland.

Party political offices
Preceded by Wu Den-yih	Chairman of the Kuomintang (acting); January–March 2020	Succeeded by Johnny Chiang
