= 2020 Kuomintang chairmanship by-election =

← 2017	7 March 2020	2021 →
- Turnout: 35.85% (▼22.2%)
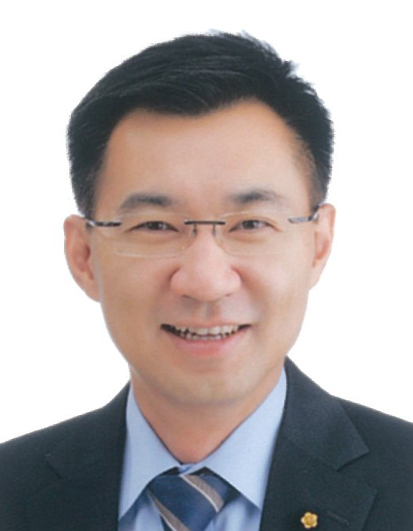

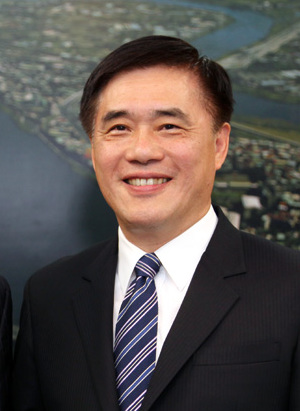
Nominee	Johnny Chiang	Hau Lung-pin
Popular vote	84,860	38,483
Percentage	68.80%	31.20%
- Vote share won by Chiang in county divisions
Chairman before election
Wu Den-yih
Lin Rong-te (acting)
Elected Chairman
Johnny Chiang

The 2020 Kuomintang chairmanship by-election (Chinese: 2020年中國國民黨主席補選) was held on 7 March 2020. This was the ninth direct election of the party leader in Kuomintang history. All registered, due-paying KMT party members were eligible to vote.

== Background ==
Kuomintang candidate Han Kuo-yu lost the 2020 Taiwanese presidential election held on 11 January 2020. On the same date, Kuomintang chairman Wu Den-yih announced his intention to resign his post, and stated that other high-ranking officers would also resign. On 14 January, the Kuomintang announced that a leadership election was scheduled for 7 March 2020. Wu's resignation as chairman took effect on 15 January 2020. From that date, Lin Rong-te assumed the chairmanship on an acting basis. Also on 15 January, seven members of the Kuomintang Central Standing Committee resigned their positions.

== Eligibility ==
Candidates for the party leadership must be a party member. The last day to declare candidacy for the 2020 leadership election was 31 January. For the 2020 leadership election, each candidate was required to collect signatures from at least 3 percent of the party membership prior to 4 February 2020. At minimum, successfully registered candidates were expected to turn in petitions with at least 7,751 valid signatures. Registration of candidates took place on 3 and 4 February.

In previous leadership elections, candidates were required to secure a simple majority in a two-round system before their certification as the victor. The party's electoral rules were revised in 2018, so that the candidate with a majority of votes would win the election. In elections with a single candidate, that candidate must win a simple majority. If a vote is tied, another election must be held within thirty days. Recounts can be requested if the margin between two candidates is within 0.2%. Additionally, regulations regarding suffrage for overseas party members were tightened. Unlike Taiwan-based members of the Kuomintang, who were eligible to vote after four months of party membership, overseas party members must have held membership for one year. The right to vote in the 2020 chairmanship election is guaranteed to party members who have paid their dues before 23 February 2020. Senior members with over 40 years affiliation with the Kuomintang are exempt from party dues, as are party members from a middle or low-income household and 65 years of age or older.

== Candidates ==
Chang Ya-chung declared his candidacy for the Kuomintang chairmanship on 14 January 2020. Wu Chih-chang, leader of the Blue Sky Action Alliance, also announced his bid. On 20 January, Hau Lung-pin began his campaign for the chairmanship. Johnny Chiang entered the leadership election on 25 January. He was also the first candidate to complete the registration process, submitting 34,782 signatures on his petition for candidacy. Hau Lung-pin was the only other candidate to register by the deadline on 4 February, submitting a petition with 40,632 signatures. Because Chang Ya-chung had not yet served on the Kuomintang's Central Committee or Central Review Committee, his chairmanship bid was ruled ineligible. Wu Chih-chang's candidacy was also deemed ineligible.

A policy presentation for candidates was held on 12 February. During the discussion, both Chiang and Hau backed party reform. Hau later specified that the Kuomintang's approach to leadership, in which discourse is dominated by the party's leader, should change to a culture emphasizing collective leadership. Changes to the Kuomintang's policy on cross-strait relations were also discussed.

== Election ==
Johnny Chiang won the chairmanship election held on 7 March 2020, winning 84,860 votes to Hau Lung-pin's 38,483. Chiang won the vote in every county, as well as the majority of votes from overseas party members. Of the 345,971 eligible electors, 124,019 cast votes; 676 of those votes were deemed invalid. Turnout was 35.85 percent. The turnout was a record low, less than the 41.61% of the 2016 chairmanship by-election.

== Result ==
Candidate	Party	Votes	%
Johnny Chiang	Kuomintang	84,860	68.80
Hau Lung-pin	Kuomintang	38,483	31.20
Total		123,343	100.00
Valid votes		123,343	99.45
Invalid/blank votes		676	0.55
Total votes		124,019	100.00
Registered voters/turnout		345,971	35.85

== Reactions ==
On 8 March 2020, the Democratic Progressive Party released a statement on Chiang's election as Kuomintang chairman. It read, in part, "We expect the new KMT chairman, Chiang, to open up a new era... People look forward to good interaction and cooperation between the ruling party and opposition parties, and for them to work together to advance Taiwan's democracy and achieve major reforms that benefit the nation." Hsu Yung-ming, who taught alongside Johnny Chiang at Soochow University, issued congratulations to Chiang in his capacity as chairman of the New Power Party. Although the General Secretary of the Chinese Communist Party traditionally acknowledged the inauguration of a new Kuomintang chairman via telegram, a direct message between the two officeholders was not sent. However, the Taiwan Affairs Office in China stated that Chiang should "cherish and protect the mutual trust between the CPP and the KMT on the foundation of the 1992 consensus."
