= 2019 Democratic Progressive Party presidential primary =

- 10 June 2019 – 13 June 2019
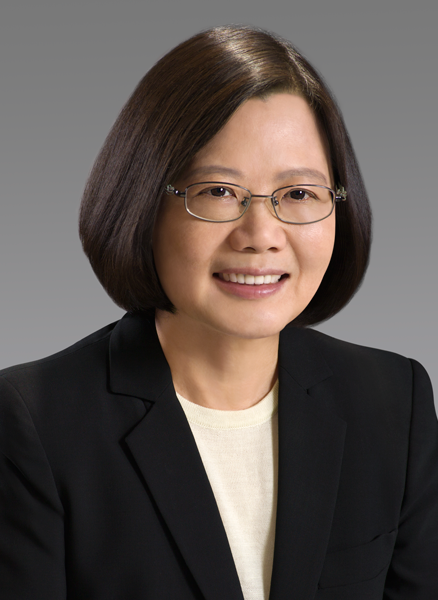

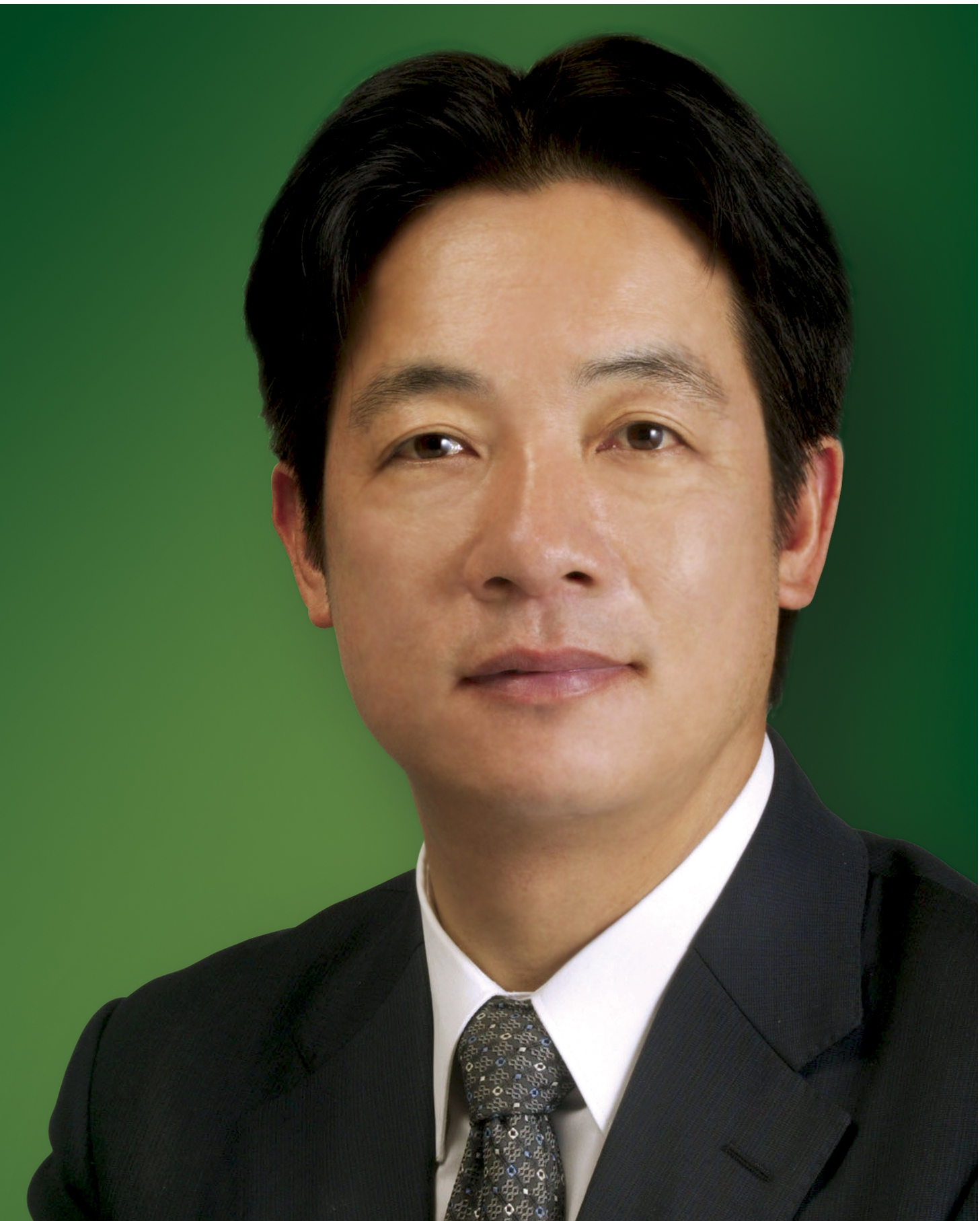
Candidate	Tsai Ing-wen	Lai Ching-te
Percentage	35.68%	27.48%
DPP nominee before election
Tsai Ing-wen
Elected DPP nominee
Tsai Ing-wen

In the 2019 Democratic Progressive Party presidential primary, the Democratic Progressive Party (DPP) of Taiwan determined its nominee for the President of the Republic of China in the 2020 presidential election. The DPP candidate for the President was selected through a series of nationwide opinion polls held from 10 June to 13 June 2019.

== Background ==
The chance of incumbent President Tsai Ing-wen seeking for re-election was heavily crippled after the Democratic Progressive Party's devastating defeat in the 2018 local elections, where the DPP lost seven of the 13 cities and counties it previously held. The DPP's share of the vote also fell from 56 to 39 per cent since the 2016 presidential election. Tsai resigned as the party chairwoman after the defeat. However, Tsai kept trailing behind in the polls as the surveys found most Taiwanese would not support Tsai in the 2020 election but would support Premier Lai Ching-te, who also resigned from the premiership for the electoral defeat in January 2019.

On 19 February 2019, Tsai Ing-wen told CNN in an interview she will run for re-election, despite facing calls from senior members of her own party to not seek re-election. Before her announcement, Tsai had received a bump in the polls after she gave a robust speech saying that her people would never relinquish their democratic freedoms, as a response to the General Secretary of the Chinese Communist Party Xi Jinping's speech in January describing Taiwan's unification with the mainland as "inevitable".

On 18 March, Lai Ching-te registered to run in the party's presidential primary, saying that he could shoulder the responsibility of leading Taiwan in defending itself from being annexed by China. This is the first time in history where a serious primary challenge has been mounted against a sitting president.

== Candidates ==
Name	Born	Current or previous positions	Announced	Ref
Tsai Ing-wen	August 30, 1956 (age 69); Taipei City, Taiwan	President of the Republic of China (2016–present); Chairperson of the Democratic Progressive Party (2008–2012; 2014–2018); Vice President of the Executive Yuan (2006–2007); Chairperson of the Consumer Protection Commission (2006–2007); Member of the Legislative Yuan (2005–2006); Minister of the Mainland Affairs Council (2000–2004)	Announced: February 19, 2019; Registered: March 21, 2019; Elected: June 13, 2019	
Lai Ching-te	October 6, 1959 (age 66); Taipei County, Taiwan	President of the Executive Yuan (2017–2019); Mayor of Tainan City (2010–2017); Member of the Legislative Yuan (1999–2010); Member of the National Assembly (1996–2000)	Announced: March 18, 2019; Registered: March 18, 2019	

== Schedule ==
The primary was originally planned to be completed on 17 April 2019, and was postponed on 27 March for one week in name of President Tsai's one-week visit to three Pacific island countries. On 10 April, the DPP Central Executive Committee decided again to postpone the primary until after 22 May 2019. Expressing deep regret, Lai Ching-te claimed that this delay denied the value of democracy, and vowed to continue his campaign until the end of the primary. Former Minister of National Defense Michael Tsai renounced his DPP membership on 12 April to protest the party's decision to delay this primary.

On 19 April, Tsai in a radio interview called on Lai to withdraw from the primary, saying things would be different, if Lai would agree to cooperate and a find solution through coordination. Lai responded by saying that he would not withdraw from the race. Amid speculation of party chairman Cho Jung-tai might resign from his post due to pressure from Tsai to cancel the primary, Lai warned the party would be very close to "evil" if it happens.

On 29 May, the DPP Central Executive Committee announced that cell phone sampling would occur in the primary polling alongside landline sampling, each accounting for a 50-percent share of the polling results. The primary polling occurred between 10 June and 13 June.

=== Timeline ===
Primary winner
Defeated in primary
End of candidate registration
Debate
Polling starts
Polling ends
Results announced

== Results ==
Results of the primary were announced on 13 June. Tsai defeated Lai by approximately 8.6 percentage points, the result was 35.68% for Tsai and 27.48% for Lai. She was formally nominated as the Democratic Progressive Party's presidential candidate on 19 June 2019.

== See also ==
- 2019 Kuomintang presidential primary
