= 2019 Kuomintang presidential primary =

- 10 June to 28 July 2019
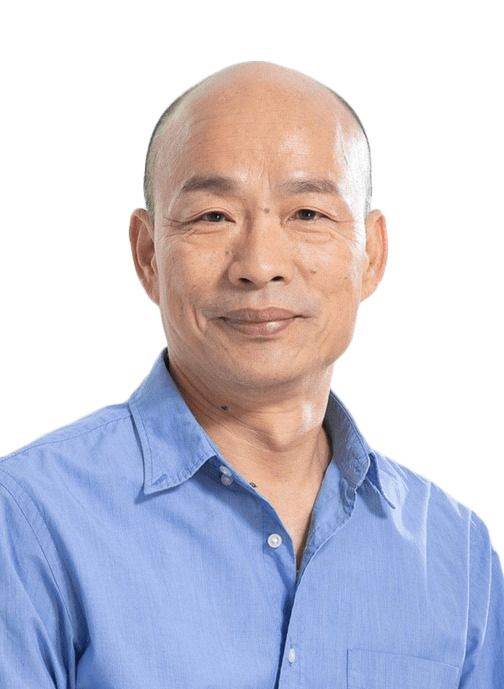

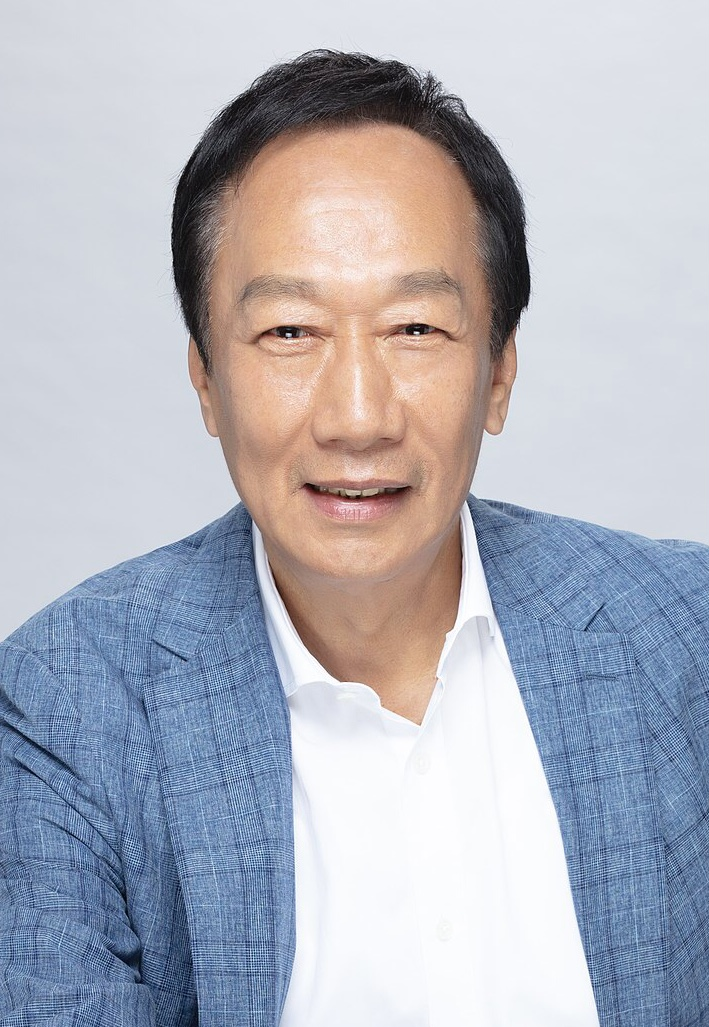

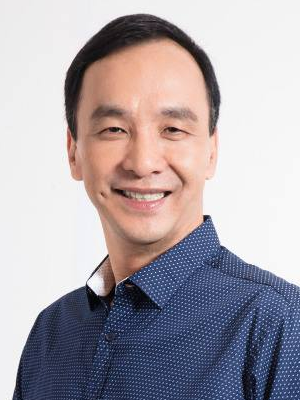

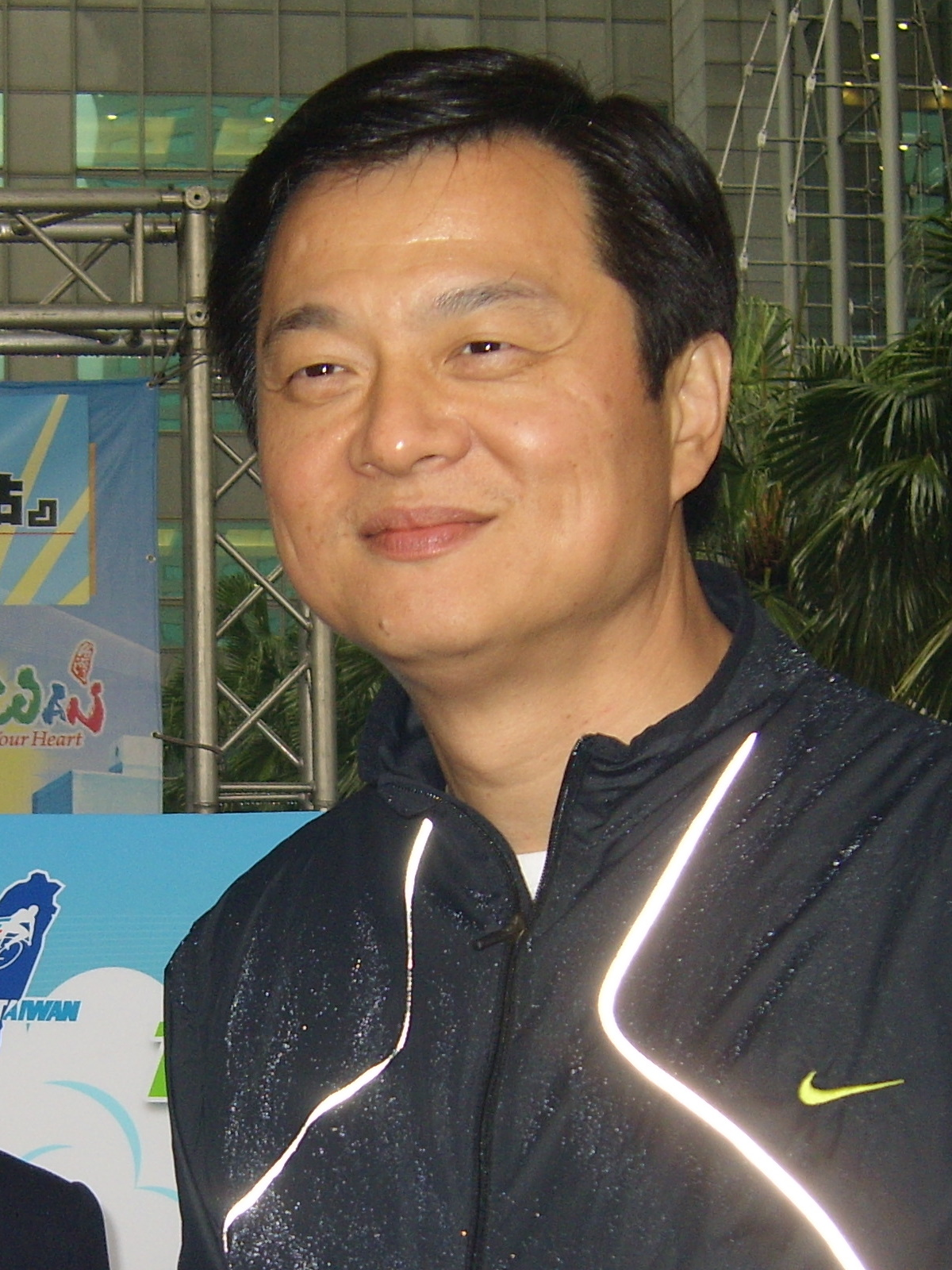

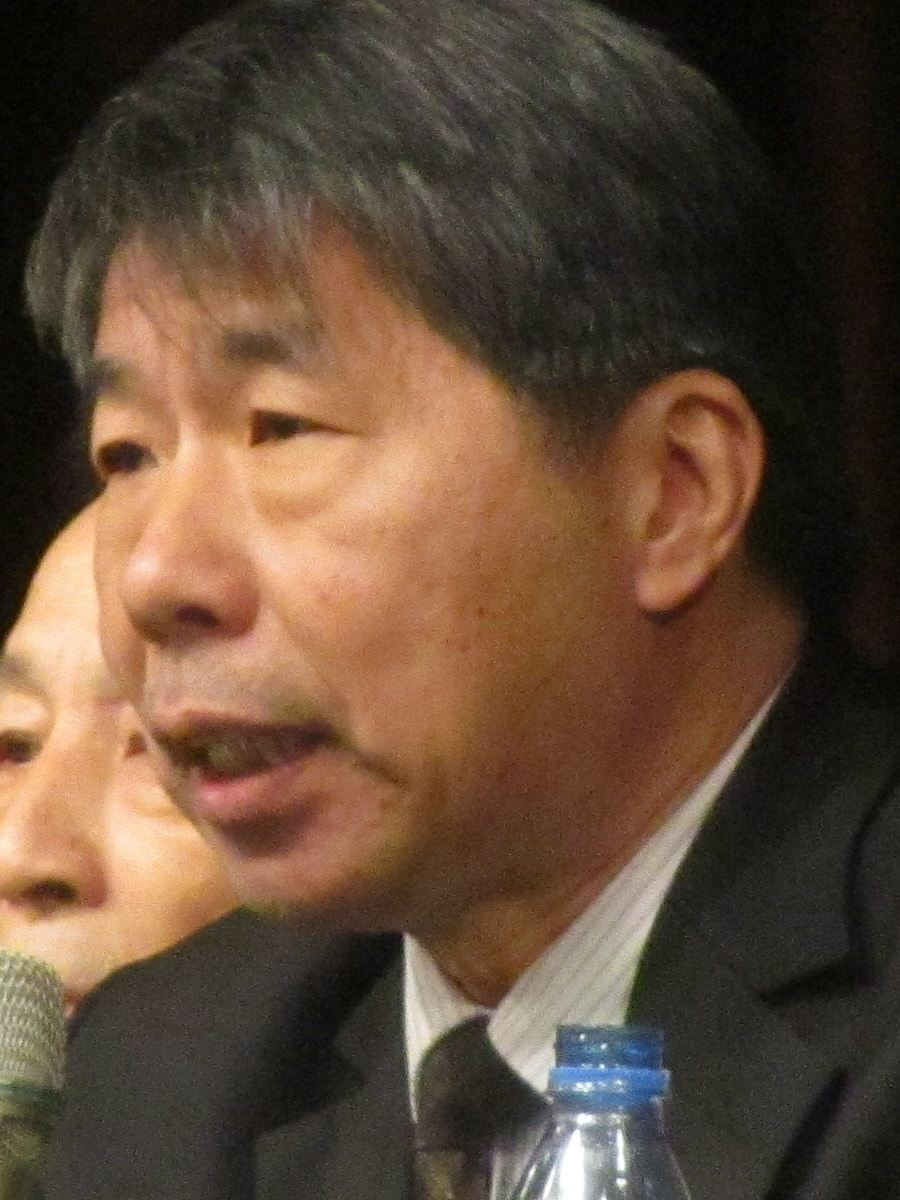
Candidate	Han Kuo-yu	Terry Gou	Eric Chu
Percentage	44.81%	27.73%	17.90%
Candidate	Chou Hsi-wei	Chang Ya-chung
Percentage	6.02%	3.54%
KMT nominee before election
Eric Chu
KMT nominee
Han Kuo-yu

The 2019 Kuomintang presidential primary was held after 22 May 2019 through a series of nationwide opinion polls in order to determine its nominee for the President of the Republic of China in the 2020 presidential election.

== Background ==
=== Early contenders ===
In late 2018, the four heavyweights in the Kuomintang, incumbent party chairman and former Vice President Wu Den-yih, former party chairman and 2016 presidential candidate Eric Chu, former President of the Legislative Yuan Wang Jin-pyng and former President Ma Ying-jeou emerged as the potential candidates for the 2020 presidential election. On 26 November 2018, former Deputy Secretary-General of the Presidential Office and incumbent Taipei City Councillor Lo Chih-chiang became the first candidate who announced his candidacy on Facebook. He later withdrew his candidacy on 7 April 2019.

On 25 December 2018, former Kuomintang chairman and 2016 presidential candidate Eric Chu announced that he would run in the 2020 presidential race when he stepped down on 25 December 2018 as Mayor of New Taipei City, becoming the first big-name politician to throw his hat in the ring. It was followed by National Taiwan University professor Chang Ya-chung who announced his candidacy on 7 January 2019.

In the December 2018 mayoral elections, the KMT received a massive victory by capturing 15 of 22 municipalities and counties, with former legislator Han Kuo-yu elected as Mayor of Kaohsiung, the deep-green Democratic Progressive Party-held city for the past two decades. The sensations created by Han during the campaign sparked speculations whether he would become the presidential candidate for KMT in 2020. The richest man in Taiwan and the founder and chairman of electronic company Foxconn Terry Gou was also reported to be interested in running in the election as a pan-Blue candidate.

On 27 February, the party passed a resolution decided its primary to be based on a 70-30 weighing of public opinion polls and party member votes, although it has not ruled out the possibility of drafting the strongest candidate in an all-out effort to win back power, which was seen to be reserved Han Kuo-yu, the party's best performing candidate in the polls. On 7 March, Wan Jyng-ping announced his candidacy.

Controversies over the primary method continued, as party chairman Wu Den-yih proposed to only allow KMT members to decide the party's presidential candidate which drew criticism, with some questioning whether he aimed to rig the game for himself. Wu later declined to run on 11 April.

=== Gou runs ===
Terry Gou announced his presidential bid by joining the KMT presidential primary on 17 April, citing sea goddess Matsu instructing him to come out and do good for the suffering of the people, and bring peace and prosperity to Taiwan in his dream. As his party membership was frozen after he had not paid the annual fee so a long time, Wu restored Guo's KMT membership by awarding him an honorary member certificate in order to enable him to run in the primary. Guo also stated that he would not accept to be drafted to run.

Han Kuo-yu, Gou's potential rival, announced on 23 April that he was "willing to take responsibility" for the development of Taiwan but was "unable" to participate in the party's primary in its current form. He expressed his disapproval of the "closed-door negotiations" within the party and called for reform. Han's announcement sparked internal strife between Han supporters and the party authorities. In order to settle the differences, the party adopted a resolution to put in place special guidelines to include all its presidential hopefuls, including Han, in its primary on the next day, and also switch the primary method from 70 to 30 weighing of public opinion polls and party member votes to fully being determined by opinion polls.

== Candidates ==
=== Declared candidates ===
Name	Born	Current or previous positions	Announced	Ref
Eric Chu	June 7, 1961 (age 64); Taoyuan County, Taiwan	Mayor of New Taipei (2016–2018; 2012–2015)	December 25, 2018	
Chang Ya-chung	December 1954 (age 71); Taichung City, Taiwan	Professor of the National Taiwan University	January 7, 2019	
Chou Hsi-wei	March 11, 1958 (age 68); Changhua County, Taiwan	Magistrate of Taipei County (2005–2010)	February 26, 2019	
Terry Gou	October 8, 1950 (age 75); Taipei County, Taiwan	Founder and Chairman of Foxconn	April 17, 2019	
Han Kuo-yu	June 17, 1957 (age 68); Taipei County, Taiwan	Mayor of Kaohsiung (2018–present)	June 5, 2019	

=== Withdrawn candidates ===
The candidates in this section have withdrawn or suspended their campaigns.

Candidate	Born	Experience	Campaign	Ref
Lo Chih-chiang	March 26, 1970 (age 56); Hualien City, Taiwan	Taipei City Councillor (2018–present)	November 26, 2018; Withdrawn: April 7, 2019	
Wang Jin-pyng	March 17, 1941 (age 85); Takao Prefecture, Japanese Taiwan	Member of the Legislative Yuan (1976–present)	March 7, 2019; Withdrawn: June 6, 2019	

=== Declined candidates ===
- Ma Ying-jeou, former President of the Republic of China 2008–2016
- Wu Den-yih, former Vice President of the Republic of China 2012–2016
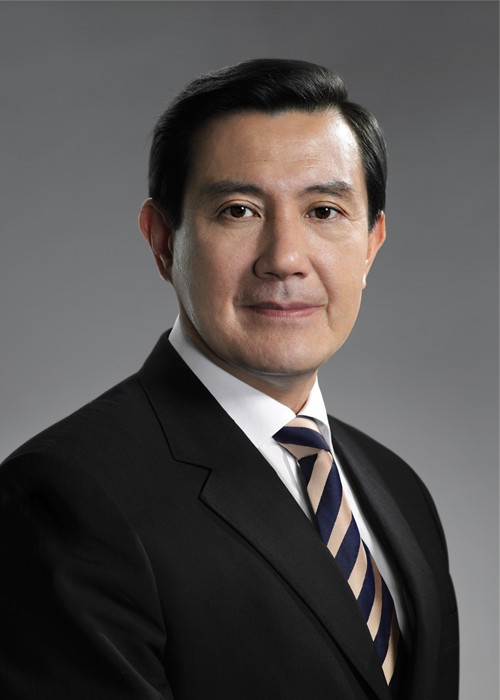
Former President
Ma Ying-jeou

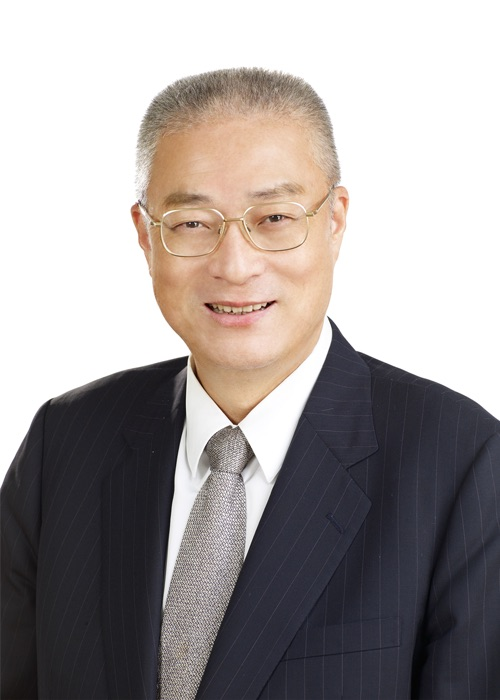
Former Vice President
Wu Den-yih

== Schedule ==
On 15 May, Kuomintang Central Standing Committee decided to change the format of the primary to a single nationwide opinion poll and to name its candidate by late July. The public opinion poll would be commissioned to five different polling institutions, each with a sample size of not less than 3,000 respondents. A list of candidates will be announced on 10 June, followed by a series of televised forums across Taiwan from 23 June to 4 July in which the candidates would introduce their platforms. The nationwide opinion poll would be held from 5 to 15 July and the results would be released the next day. After that, the results will be submitted to the Central Standing Committee on 17 July for approval. The presidential candidate would be formally announced on 28 July at its national congress.

The Kuomintang announced five primary contestants on June 10, 2019: Chang Ya-chung, Chou Hsi-wei, Eric Chu, Terry Gou, and Han Kuo-yu.

=== Timeline ===
Primary winner
Defeated in primary
Withdrawn
Candidates announced
Debates
Polling starts
Polling ends
Results announced

== Opinion polling ==
Date	Pollster	Sample size	Ma	Chu	Wang	Wu	Han	Gou	Chou	Chang
9 July 2019	Trend Poll	3,000	—N/a	14.9	—N/a	—N/a	34.3	29.5	1.4	0.8
9 July 2019	EtToday	2,271	—N/a	11.9	—N/a	—N/a	28.0	29.5	0.7	2.3
21 June 2019	EtToday	5,021	—N/a	9.9	—N/a	—N/a	28.2	25.7	—N/a	—N/a
18 June 2019	EtToday	4,047	—N/a	9.0	—N/a	—N/a	31.1	24.7	—N/a	—N/a
11 June 2019	EtToday	4,047	—N/a	7.1	—N/a	—N/a	29.5	24.4	—N/a	—N/a
4 June 2019	Trend Poll	1,287	—N/a	17.4	—N/a	—N/a	35.2	28.4	1.2	0.9
28 May 2019	Formsa	1,086	—N/a	11.6	7.5	—N/a	22.0	17.8	0.9	0.1
16 May 2019	Fount Media	1,075	—N/a	17.4	15.8	—N/a	30.6	22.2	—N/a	—N/a
13 May 2019	EtToday	2,875	—N/a	8.2	7.6	—N/a	29.3	22.8	—N/a	—N/a
30 April 2019	China Times	1,004	—N/a	7.0	11.0	—N/a	34.2	16.3	—N/a	—N/a
29 April 2019	TVBS	1,090	—N/a	10.0	14.0	—N/a	37.0	20.0	—N/a	—N/a
25 April 2019	TVBS	1,222	—N/a	11.0	14.0	—N/a	38.0	18.0	—N/a	—N/a
21 April 2019	ETtoday	7,868	—N/a	6.5	7.7	—N/a	26.2	24.0	—N/a	—N/a
21 April 2019	UDN	1,178	—N/a	13.0	11.0	—N/a	26.0	19.0	—N/a	—N/a
2 April 2019	Fount Media	1,079	—N/a	18.6	19.1	—N/a	25.4	22.9	—N/a	—N/a
2 April 2019	Fount Media	1,079	—N/a	23.6	22.0	—N/a	32.2	—N/a	—N/a	—N/a
18 December 2018	TPOF	1,082	—N/a	54.3	25.5	6.5	—N/a	—N/a	—N/a	—N/a
18 December 2018	TPOF	1,082	54.3	4.0	25.0	2.5	—N/a	—N/a	—N/a	—N/a

== Results ==
Results of the primary were announced on 15 July 2019. Han Kuo-yu received 44.805 percent of the vote, followed by Terry Gou at 27.73%, and Eric Chu's 17.90%. Both Chou Hsi-wei and Chang Ya-chung polled in the single digits, at 6.02% and 3.54% respectively.

2019 Kuomintang Republic of China presidential primary results
Candidates	Place	Result
Han Kuo-yu	Nominated	44.81%
Terry Gou	2nd	27.73%
Eric Chu	3rd	17.90%
Chou Hsi-wei	4th	6.02%
Chang Ya-chung	5th	3.54%

== See also ==
- 2019 Democratic Progressive Party presidential primary
