= Terry Gou =

Founder and former Chief Executive Officer of Foxconn

- 郭台銘
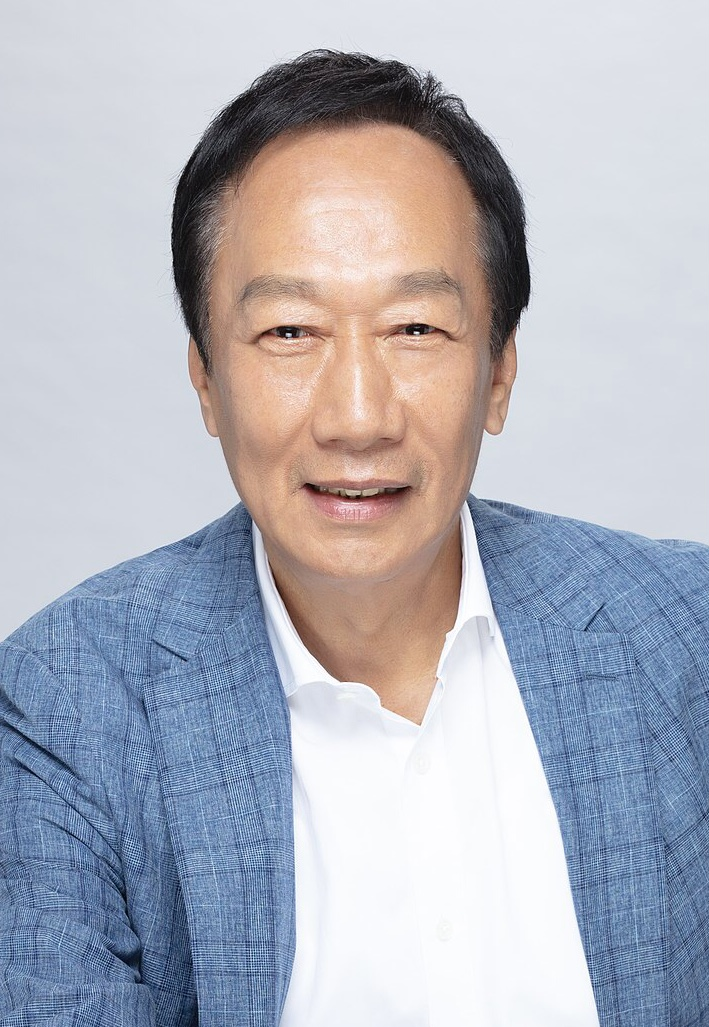
- Gou in 2019
- Born: 18 October 1950 (age 76); Banqiao, Taiwan
- Education: Taipei University of Marine Technology (BS)
- Years active: 1974–present
- Known for: Founder of Foxconn
- Political party: Kuomintang (1970–2000; 2019); Independent (2000–2019; 2019–)
- Spouses: Serena Lin (m. 1974; died 2005) Delia Tseng (m. 2008)
- Children: 5
- Relatives: Sophie Chang (cousin)

Chinese name
- Traditional Chinese: 郭台銘
- Simplified Chinese: 郭台铭
Transcriptions
Standard Mandarin
- Hanyu Pinyin: Guō Táimíng
- Bopomofo: ㄍㄨㄛ ㄊㄞˊ ㄇㄧㄥˊ
- Wade–Giles: Kuo¹ T'ai²-ming²
- Tongyong Pinyin: Guo Tái-míng
Yue: Cantonese
- Jyutping: gwok3 toi4 ming4
Southern Min
- Hokkien POJ: Koeh Tâi-bêng
- Tâi-lô: Kueh Tâi-bîng

Signature
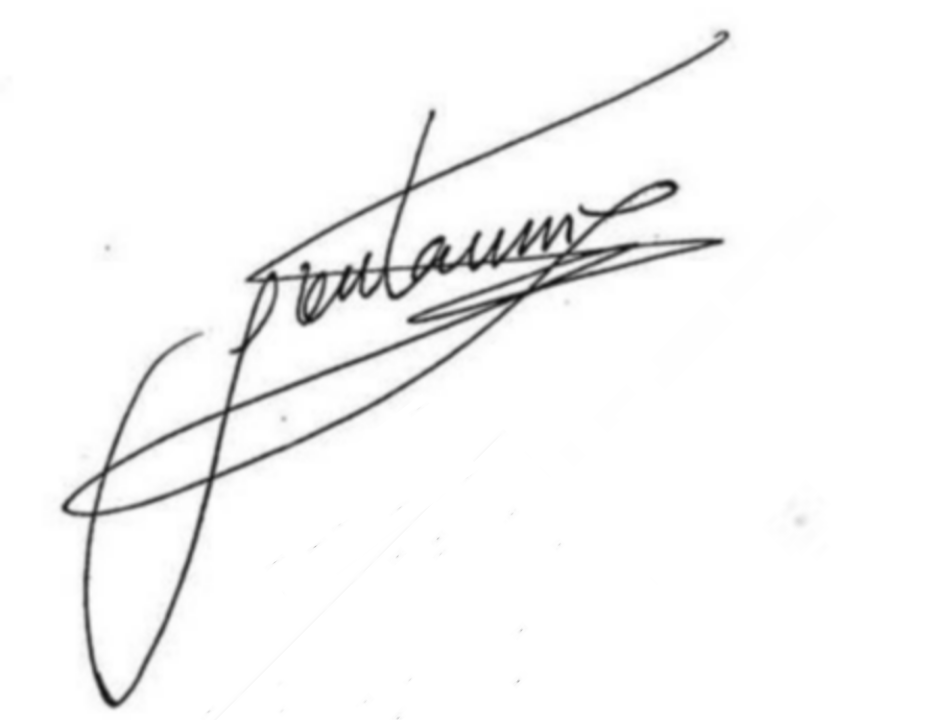

Terry Gou (Chinese: 郭台銘; pinyin: Guō Táimíng; born 18 October 1950) is a Taiwanese billionaire businessman and politician. He is the founder and former chairman and chief executive officer (CEO) of Foxconn, the world's largest contract manufacturer of electronics. As of 2024, Gou has a net worth of US$10.4 billion.

Born in Banqiao, Taiwan, to waishengren parents, Gou founded Hon Hai Plastics Corporation, the predecessor of Hon Hai Precision Industry and Foxconn, in 1974. He expanded the company into computer engineering during the 1980s and established its first manufacturing facility in mainland China in 1988. Foxconn soon became a leading manufacturer of consumer electronics, particularly through its production of Apple's iPhone and other devices. His tenure was marked by rapid international expansion, including the 2016 acquisition of the Japanese electronics company Sharp Corporation.

Gou entered electoral politics in 2019, seeking the Kuomintang (KMT) nomination for the 2020 Taiwanese presidential election but losing the party's primary to Han Kuo-yu. He again sought the KMT nomination for the 2024 Taiwanese presidential election, but the party instead nominated Hou Yu-ih. Gou then announced an independent presidential campaign in August 2023, advocating closer relations with mainland China and the reduction of cross-strait tensions. He qualified to stand as an independent candidate after collecting sufficient signatures but withdrew from the election in November 2023, before the registration deadline.

== Early life ==
Gou was born on 18 October 1950 in Banqiao District, Taipei County (now New Taipei City), Taiwan. His father, Guo Lingrui (郭齡瑞), and mother, Chu Yongzhen (初永真), married in Qingdao, Shandong, China, in 1946 before relocating to Taiwan. Originally from Shanxi, his father had attended the Central Police Academy's Xi'an branch before beginning his police career in Qingdao. After arriving in Taiwan, his father initially worked in anti-smuggling operations at Keelung Harbor before eventually returning to police work in Banqiao.

Gou was raised in a small rented residence beside Banqiao Cihui Temple, a temple dedicated to the goddess Mazu. The family relocated to police accommodation in Yonghe District following his father's reassignment to the area. During part of his childhood, Gou lived with his maternal grandmother, who spoke a Shandong dialect. The dialect became his first language, followed by Taiwanese Hokkien, which he learned while interacting with neighborhood children, and Mandarin Chinese, which he began learning after entering elementary school.

Gou attended kindergarten in Banqiao at the age of five. He then attended Puqian Elementary School as a member of its inaugural class before transferring to Banqiao Elementary School following a change in his father's police assignment. He graduated from Banqiao Elementary School in 1962. He then continued his education at the junior high school division of Banqiao High School.

In 1966, Gou enrolled at China Maritime College (now Taipei University of Marine Technology), a recently established maritime vocational institution. He graduated in 1972 with a degree in ship management. To finance his education, he began working while still in junior high school, including taking overnight shifts at a rubber factory in Banqiao. He also worked in grinding-wheel and pharmaceutical factories while supporting himself through part-time employment.

After college, Gou completed compulsory military service as a reserve officer in the Republic of China Air Force, initially serving on Kinmen before being transferred to Ching Chuan Kang Air Base. He spent one year and ten months in military service. Following his discharge, Gou briefly worked in the shipping industry before establishing his own manufacturing business.

== Foxconn ==
=== Founding and early expansion (1974–1990s) ===
In 1974, Gou established Hon Hai Plastics Corporation (鴻海塑料企業有限公司), the predecessor of Hon Hai Precision Industry, in Taiwan. He founded the company with US$7,500 borrowed from his mother and an initial workforce of eleven older employees. The company's earliest products were inexpensive plastic components, including knobs for black-and-white televisions manufactured for an American television company based in Chicago. Gou later recalled that his mother had obtained his initial startup funds through a rotating savings and credit association, known in Taiwan as a biaohui (標會).

In 1980, the company secured a contract to manufacture joystick connectors for the American video game company Atari, an important early customer. Hon Hai developed connectors for personal computers in 1981, marking its expansion beyond components for household appliances. The following year, the company changed its name to Hon Hai Precision Industry (鴻海精密工業股份有限公司). During the early 1980s, Gou undertook an eleven-month trip across the United States to solicit business from American technology companies, including IBM. In 1985, Hon Hai established an American subsidiary as part of its expansion into the United States market.

On 6 June 1988, Gou's company established its first manufacturing facility in mainland China in the Longhua area of Shenzhen, Guangdong Province. Hon Hai then expanded its mainland manufacturing operations, including the development of a large industrial complex in Longhua that incorporated production facilities, worker dormitories, restaurants, markets, and recreational amenities. Hon Hai became a publicly traded company on the Taiwan Stock Exchange on 18 June 1991. In 1996, the company began developing its Longhua Science and Technology Park and expanded its manufacturing operations into personal computers and barebone computer systems. By 2001, Hon Hai had become Taiwan's largest privately owned manufacturing enterprise by revenue.

=== Partnership with Apple and manufacturing growth ===
Under Gou, Foxconn adopted a vertically integrated manufacturing strategy that emphasized producing components internally or purchasing them in large quantities while offering manufacturing and assembly services to other technology companies. Rather than developing its own competing consumer electronics brands, he concentrated on original equipment manufacturer (OEM) services and long-term relationships with customers. Foxconn also absorbed some initial tooling expenses for customers and sought to integrate component procurement, production, and logistics within its manufacturing operations.

Foxconn's relationship with Apple Inc. initially involved supplying inexpensive electronic components, including connectors used in computers during the 1990s. In 1999, Foxconn secured an order to manufacture the external enclosures for Apple's Power Macintosh G4 computers. In 2000, the company won a contract to manufacture redesigned iMac computers. Foxconn subsequently became a major producer of Apple's portable electronic devices, including the iPod and iPhone. Gou worked directly with Apple's co-founder Steve Jobs during the development of the original iPhone.

Foxconn's revenue increased from approximately US$1.8 billion in 1999 to US$98 billion in 2010, with its expanding business relationship with Apple accounting for much of that growth. In addition to Apple, the company manufactured electronic products for major international technology brands, including Dell, Hewlett-Packard, Sony, and Amazon. Foxconn eventually became China's largest private-sector employer, with a workforce numbering approximately 1.2 million people at its peak.

=== Labor controversies ===
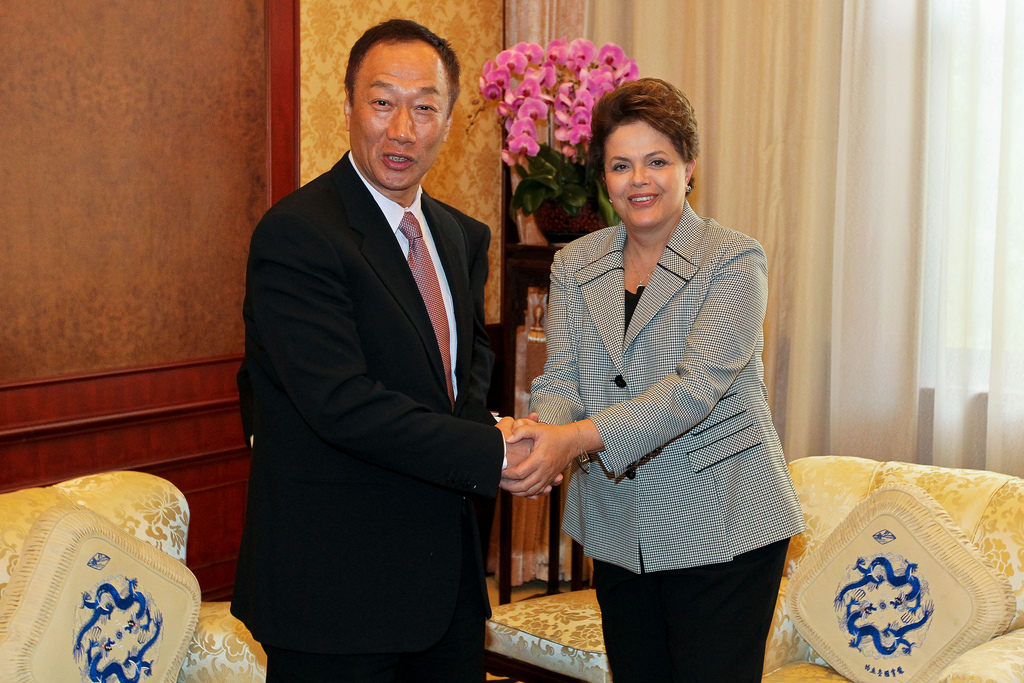
Gou with Brazilian president Dilma Rousseff in 2011

During Gou's tenure as chairman, Foxconn attracted international scrutiny over working conditions at its manufacturing facilities in mainland China. In 2010, a series of worker suicides at the company's industrial complex in Shenzhen prompted concerns about employee welfare and the psychological pressures associated with factory work. Labor campaigners criticized long working hours, low basic wages, and restrictions on social interaction during production shifts, although some employees said that Foxconn's wages and conditions compared favorably with those of other manufacturers.

In May 2010, Gou visited Foxconn's Longhua facility and told reporters that he feared receiving news of further worker deaths. He also apologized for a company document that had asked employees to agree that their families would not receive additional compensation in the event of a suicide, and announced that the document would be withdrawn. Foxconn subsequently installed anti-suicide netting around factory and dormitory buildings, introduced counseling measures, and pledged salary increases for workers at the facility.

In March 2012, an investigation conducted by the Fair Labor Association at three Foxconn factories found violations involving excessive overtime, inadequate compensation, and workplace health and safety risks. Following the investigation, Foxconn and Apple agreed to reduce working hours, improve safety procedures, and address problems with employee compensation and accommodation.

=== Acquisitions and international investments ===
In May 2015, Gou announced plans for Foxconn to develop between ten and twelve manufacturing and data-processing facilities in India by 2020, estimating that the proposed expansion could require several billion dollars in investment. In August of that year, Gou and the government of Maharashtra announced an agreement under which Foxconn proposed investing US$5 billion over five years in an electronics manufacturing facility in the Indian state.

Gou also led Foxconn's efforts to acquire the Japanese electronics manufacturer Sharp Corporation, which had experienced substantial financial difficulties. In March 2016, Foxconn agreed to purchase approximately two-thirds of Sharp for US$3.5 billion after reducing an earlier offer following the disclosure of additional liabilities at the Japanese company. The acquisition provided Foxconn with access to Sharp's advanced display technology and strengthened its position as a supplier to major electronics manufacturers, including Apple.

=== Wisconsin manufacturing project ===
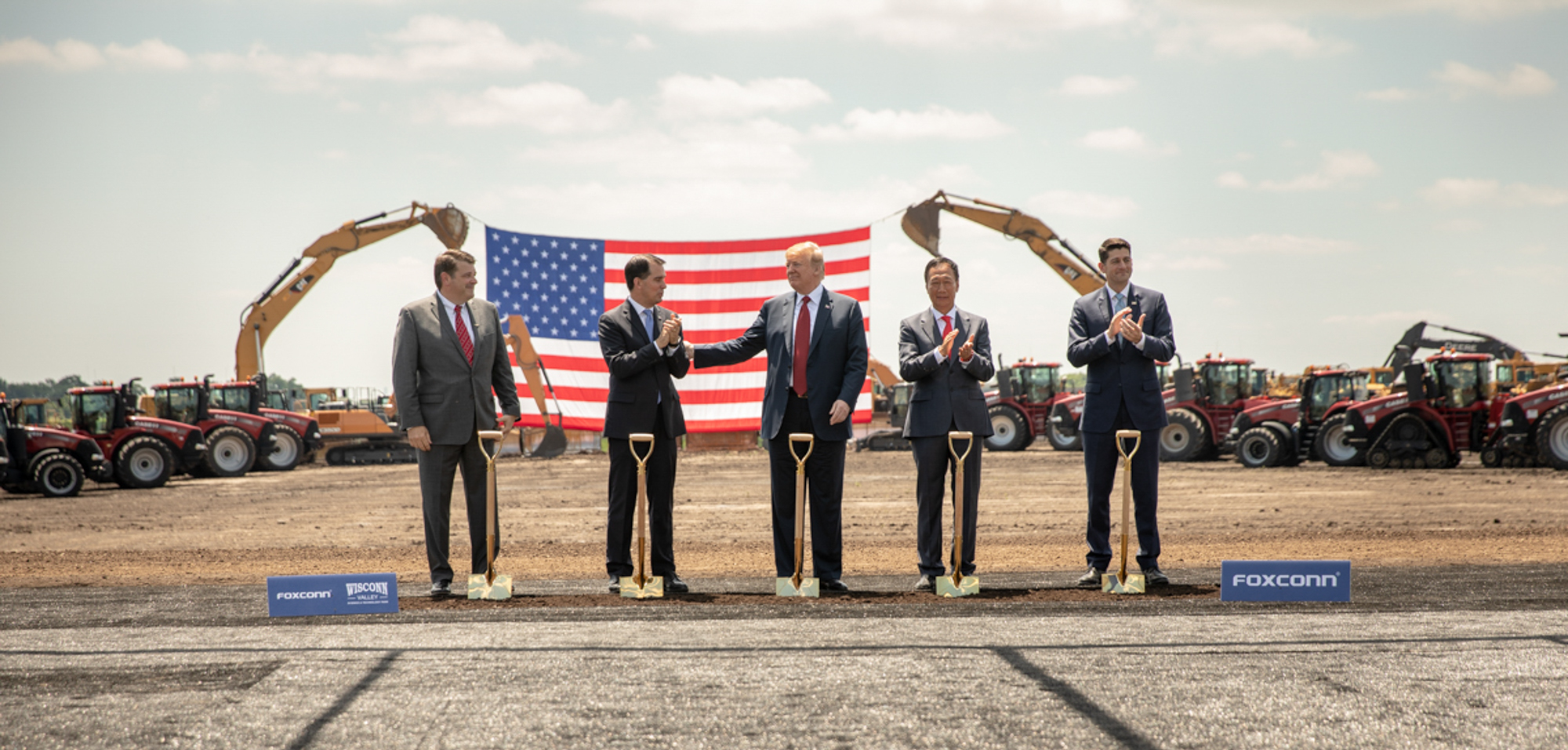
Speaker Paul Ryan, President Donald Trump, Governor Scott Walker, Terry Gou and Christopher Murdock at Foxconn's June 2018 groundbreaking ceremony in Wisconsin

In July 2017, Gou joined U.S. President Donald Trump at the White House to announce a proposed US$10 billion Foxconn investment in a liquid-crystal display manufacturing facility in Wisconsin. The proposed manufacturing campus was expected to cover approximately 20 million square feet and eventually employ as many as 13,000 workers. In November 2017, Gou and Wisconsin Governor Scott Walker signed an agreement providing for up to US$3 billion in state tax incentives, contingent upon Foxconn meeting its investment and employment commitments.

On 28 June 2018, Gou participated in a groundbreaking ceremony for the proposed manufacturing complex in Mount Pleasant, Wisconsin, alongside Trump, Walker, and other American political officials. In January 2019, while Gou was still chairman, Foxconn announced that it was reconsidering its original plans to manufacture advanced LCD panels at the Wisconsin facility and might instead emphasize engineering and research operations.

In April 2021, after Gou had relinquished the chairmanship, Foxconn and Wisconsin authorities renegotiated the agreement, reducing the company's planned investment from US$10 billion to US$672 million and its employment target from 13,000 to 1,454 jobs.

=== Departure from management ===
In April 2019, Gou announced that he intended to step down as Foxconn's chairman to allow younger executives to assume greater leadership responsibilities. On 21 June 2019, Foxconn announced that Young Liu, the head of its semiconductor business, would succeed Gou as chairman. Gou also transferred responsibility for the company's daily operations to a newly established nine-member operations committee while retaining a seat on Hon Hai's board of directors.

On 2 September 2023, Gou resigned from Foxconn's board of directors, shortly after he announced an independent candidacy in the 2024 Taiwanese presidential election. Despite relinquishing his executive and board positions, Gou remained Foxconn's largest shareholder as of February 2024.

== Other business ventures ==
In 2019, Gou argued that Apple should move its manufacturing out of mainland China to Taiwan. The comments came after he confirmed he will step down from his role as Foxconn chairman.

Gou is also the main owner of HMD Global, which is a company founded in 2016 to sell Nokia branded phones. HMD buys the R&D, manufacturing and distribution from FIH Ltd, which is part of Hon Hai group.

In April 2021, Gou became the biggest shareholder in the biotech company Eirgenix. In December 2022, The Wall Street Journal reported that a letter from Gou helped convince the Chinese government to ease Zero-COVID restrictions amid the COVID-19 pandemic.

== Political career ==
Gou first joined the Kuomintang in 1970, but allowed his membership to lapse after 2000. In the 2012 Taiwan presidential election, Gou endorsed Ma Ying-jeou, stating that Ma was an "experienced, outstanding helmsman." After Donald Trump won the 2016 United States presidential election, Gou was the subject of a spoof open letter in Bloomberg, in which author Tim Culpan was severely critical of Trump. The article was mistakenly reported as having been written by Gou himself.

=== Political views ===
An opponent of the Taiwan independence movement, Gou claims the Democratic Progressive Party (DPP) "exalts Taiwan independence and hates and opposes China". His position is that Taiwan independence is not an issue. Instead, he supports the 1992 Consensus under the one-China framework.

In 2019, Gou expressed misgivings about the legalization of same-sex marriage in Taiwan, arguing that the Legislative Yuan did not respect the results of the 2018 referendum where a majority voted against legalization.

=== 2020 presidential election ===
From 2016, it was widely reported that Gou was considering a 2020 Taiwanese presidential bid, and speculation continued into 2017. He rejoined the Kuomintang in April 2019. On 17 April 2019, Gou announced his intention to run in the Kuomintang primary for the 2020 presidential election.

Gou declared that he had been instructed by the sea goddess Mazu in a dream to run as a candidate in the 2020 presidential election of the Republic of China. He finished second in the 2019 Kuomintang presidential primary, with 27.7% of the vote. On 12 September 2019, Gou announced his withdrawal from the Kuomintang. Four days later, Gou stated that he would not participate in the 2020 presidential election as an independent candidate. Gou was offered the top position on the Taiwan People's Party party list for the 2020 legislative election, but declined such a bid.

2019 Kuomintang Republic of China presidential primary results
Candidates	Place	Result
Han Kuo-yu	Nominated	44.81%
Terry Gou	2nd	27.73%
Eric Chu	3rd	17.90%
Chou Hsi-wei	4th	6.02%
Chang Ya-chung	5th	3.54%

=== 2024 presidential election ===
In April 2023, Gou announced he would run for President in the Taiwanese 2024 general election. Polling conducted in January 2023 found him in second place in a hypothetical KMT primary with Hou Yu-ih, the Mayor of New Taipei, receiving 28.6% of the vote versus Hou's 36.7%. Gou formally declared his independent presidential bid on August 28. On September 2, Foxconn announced that Gou had resigned his position on the board of directors for personal reasons.

On 14 September 2023, Gou announced as his running mate the actress and writer Lai Pei-hsia, also known as Tammy Lai.

Gou officially qualified for the presidential election on 14 November 2023, when the signatures he had collected in order to run as an independent candidate were validated by Taiwan's Central Election Commission. However, on 24 November 2023 he announced he was dropping out of the presidential race, and his name would not appear on the ballot.

== Public image ==
As a billionaire businessman and relative political outsider, Gou was compared to Trump in international media during his 2019 presidential candidacy.

In 2007, Gou cited Genghis Khan as a personal hero. Gou reportedly wears on his right wrist a beaded bracelet procured at a temple dedicated to the Genghis Khan.

=== "Animal" management comment controversy ===
In 2012, a controversy arose after Gou jokingly compared Foxconn's workforce to animals during a company event at the Taipei zoo. The Xinhua News Agency reported that while speaking on the challenges of presiding over a workforce with over one million employees, Gou stated that as "human beings are also animals, to manage one million animals gives me a headache."

Foxconn defended Gou's comments, stating that "Mr. Gou did say that, since all humans are members of the animal kingdom, it might be possible to learn from [the Director of the Taipei Zoo, Chin Shih-chien] Mr. Chin's experience as his team looks for lessons that can be applied to business." Moreover, Foxconn clarified that Gou's comments were not discriminatory, explaining that "Mr. Gou's comments were directed at all humans and not at any specific group".

=== Anti-Korean comment ===
In June 2012, Gou stated that he had "great esteem for Japanese (businessmen), especially those who are able to disagree with you in person and not stab you in the back, unlike the Gaoli bangzi". Gaoli bangzi is a racial slur for Korean people.

== Personal life ==
Gou and his first wife, Serena Lin (林淑如; Lín Shúrú; 1950–2005), have a son who works in the film and real estate industries and a daughter who worked in the financial sector. Gou founded an educational charity with Lin in 2000 and intended to eventually give away one third of his wealth to charity. After Gou's wife died, Gou's daughter assumed leadership in the charity.

In the 1990s, Gou had an extramarital affair with Chen Chung-mei, a bar girl, who had a private investigator videotape her and Gou having sex in order to blackmail Gou for money. While Gou first agreed to pay the money, when they next met he had police arrest Chen and the private investigator, Hsu Ching-wei, and sued them for extortion, stating he knew the affair would become "exposed one way or another".

In 2002, he bought a Roztěž castle near Kutná Hora in the Czech Republic for $30 million.

In 2005, Serena Lin died of breast cancer at the age of 55. Gou's younger brother, Tony Gou, died in 2007 of leukemia. Also that year, Hsu Ching-wei accused Gou of having an affair during the 1990s.

In 2007, Gou publicly pursued movie star Carina Lau. He confirmed to the media that their relationship had “just started” and that he was “serious” about her, greatly raising his public profile and marking the beginning of his emergence as a media personality. Lau responded by saying that Tony Leung, her long-time partner, was aware of the courtship. The relationship was ended by Lau.

Gou married his second wife, choreographer Delia Tseng (born 1974) on 26 July 2008. Tseng and Gou have three children. Together, they have decided to give 90% of Gou's wealth away.

=== Wealth ===
In 2016, Gou's net worth was US$5.6 billion. By August 2017, Forbes listed his net worth at US$10.6 billion. As of 2022, Gou had a net worth of US$6.8 billion, making him the sixth wealthiest person in Taiwan.
