= Second inauguration of Tsai Ing-wen =

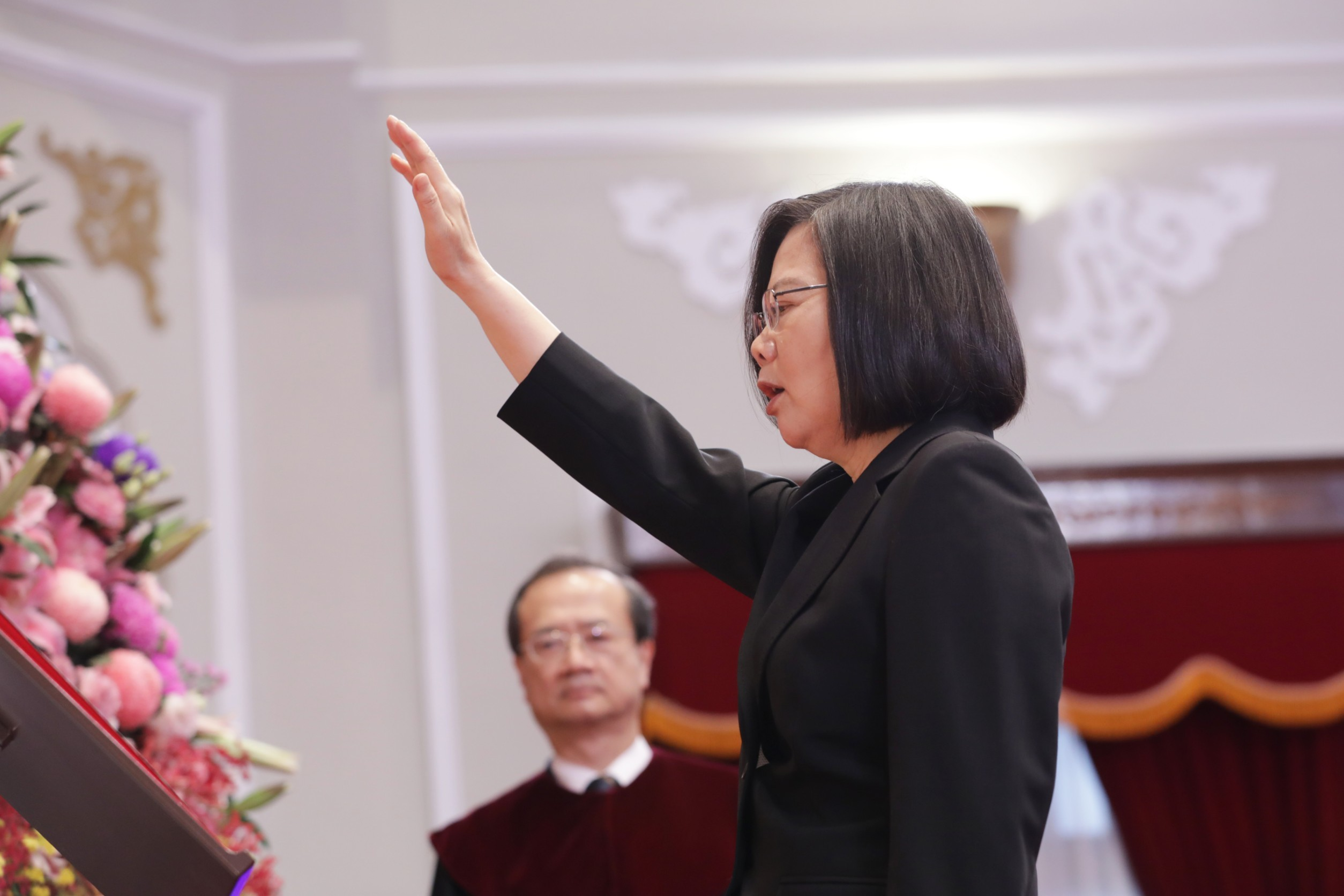
- President Tsai takes oath of office as the 15th president of Taiwan
- Native name: 第十五任總統暨副總統就職典禮
- Date: 20 May 2020
- Location: Taipei, Taiwan Taipei Guest House President office
- Participants: The President Tsai Ing-wen elected vice president Lai Ching-te
- Website: Inauguration of 15th term President and Vice President

The second inauguration of Tsai Ing-wen as the 15th president of Taiwan was held on May 20, 2020, marking the second four-year term of Tsai Ing-wen as president and the only four-year term of Lai Ching-te as vice president. Before this, candidate of Democratic Progressive Party, Tsai won the election in 2020 in a landslide. Festivities were sharply curtailed by efforts to prevent the spread of COVID-19.

== Inaugural Events ==
=== Oath of office ===
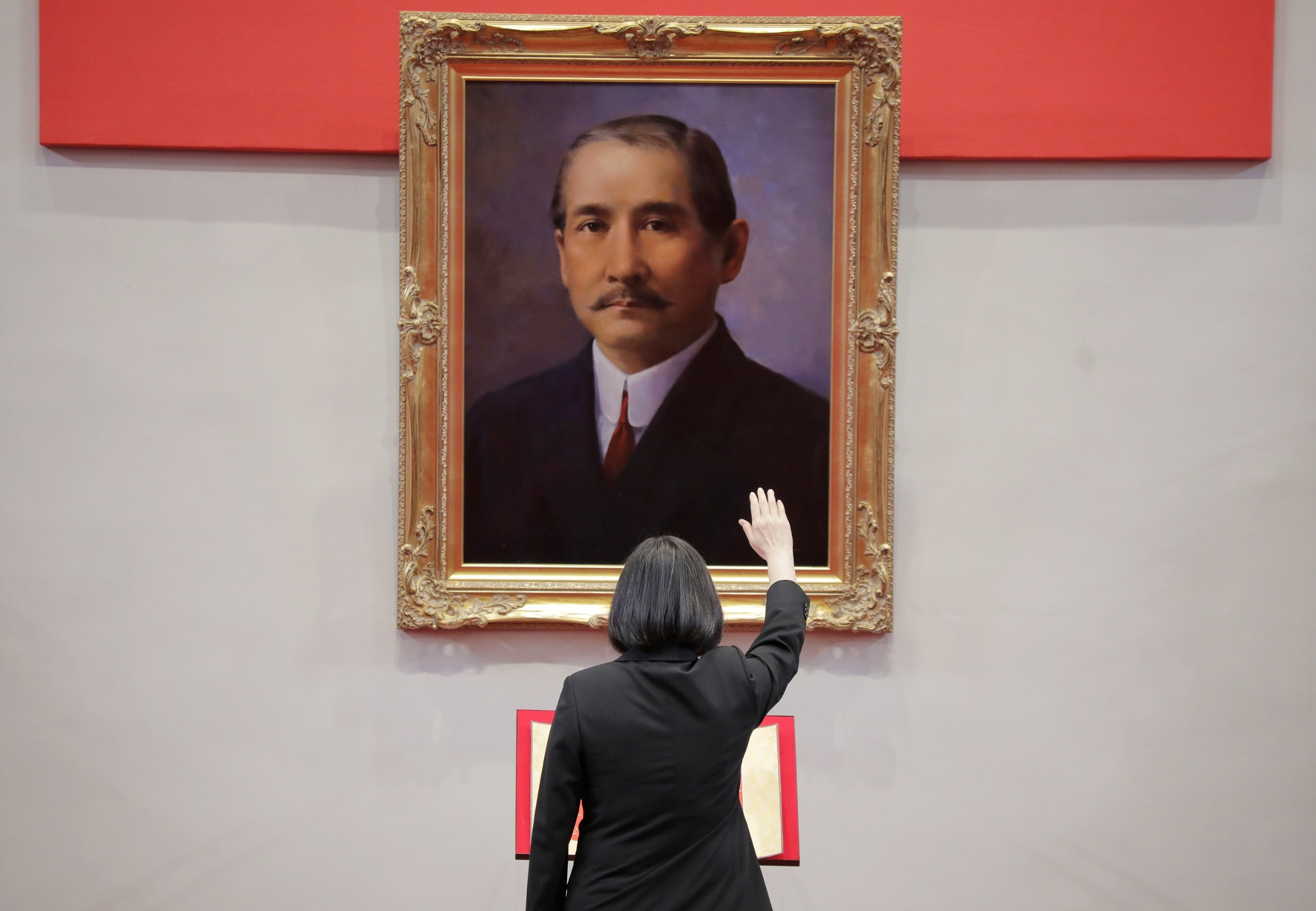
President of Tsai swore to Sun Yat-sen

Held at 9:00 a.m, swore to Sun Yat-sen, Tsai recited the following:

余謹以至誠，向全國人民宣誓，余必遵守憲法，效忠國家，如違誓言，願受國家嚴厲之制裁。

I do solemnly and sincerely swear before the people of the whole country that I will observe the Constitution, faithfully perform my duties, promote the welfare of the people, safeguard the security of the State, and will in no way betray the people's trust. Should I break my oath, I shall be willing to submit myself to severe punishment by the State. This is my solemn oath.

After that, the Secretary-General to the President, Secretary-General of National Security Council and President of the Executive Yuan, began to take oaths, who were administered by The President Tsai.

=== Inaugural address ===
Due to attendance restrictions designed to prevent the spread of COVID-19, Tsai delivered her address Taipei Guest House instead of The President Office. In the speech, Tsai mentioned COVID-19 pandemic crisis.
