= Chang Ya-chung =

Taiwanese political scientist

- 張亞中
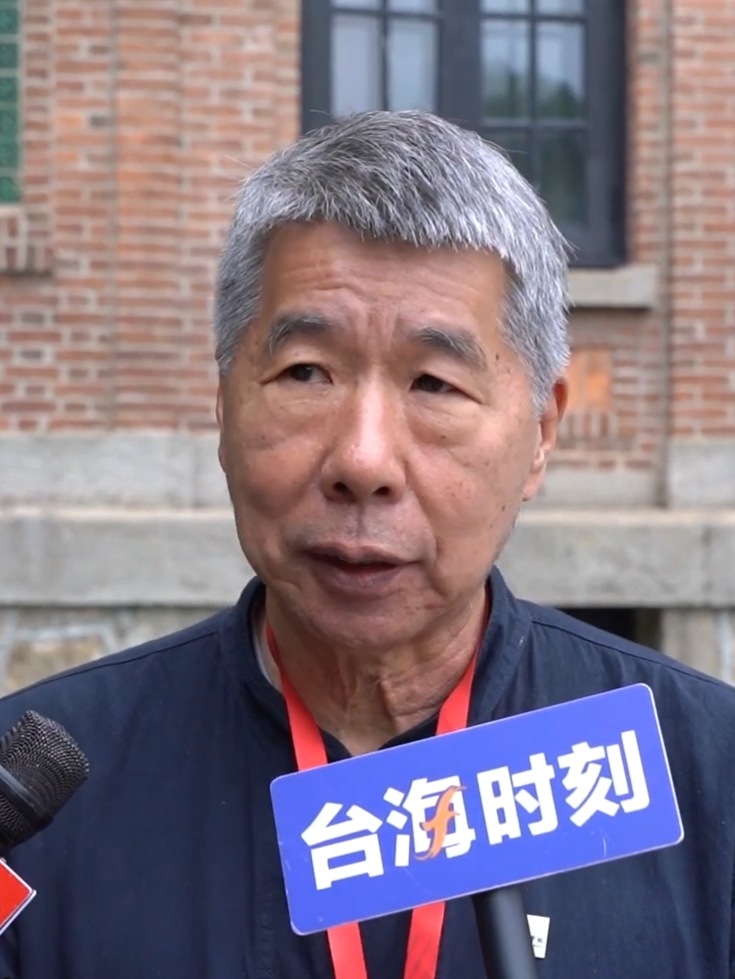
- Chang in 2023
- Born: December 28, 1954 (age 71); Taichung, Taiwan
- Education: Chinese Culture University (BS); National Chengchi University (MA, PhD); University of Hamburg (PhD)
- Occupation: Political science professor
- Political party: Kuomintang
- Scientific career
- Fields: Political science International relations
- Institutions: National Taiwan University
- Theses: The German Question (1991); Transitions from authoritarianism to democracy in Taiwan (1992)

Chang Ya-chung (Chinese: 張亞中; pinyin: Zhāng Yàzhōng; born December 28, 1954) is a Taiwanese political scientist and professor at National Taiwan University. He founded the Democratic Action Alliance in 2004 and was elected to the National Assembly in 2005, but resigned on the first day to protest the parliament's formation. He later chaired the Chinese Integration Association. Chang subsequently became an active member of the Kuomintang, contesting the party's 2019 presidential primary. He was deemed an ineligible candidate for the party's 2020 leadership election, placing second in the following year. He ran again in 2025, finishing fourth.

== Early life and education ==
Chang was born on December 28, 1954, in a military dependents' village in Shuinan, Taichung. He was the third child in a waishengren family; he has an older brother and a younger sister. His father was a lieutenant colonel in the Republic of China Air Force and his mother was a housewife. Their ancestral home was in Yuncheng, Shanxi.

After graduating from Taichung Municipal Second Senior High School, Chang earned a bachelor's degree in mechanical engineering from Chinese Culture University. He then earned a master's degree in diplomacy in 1984 and a Ph.D. in political science in 1991, both from National Chengchi University. His master's thesis was titled, "A Study of Adenauer's Eastward Advance and German Policy (1955-1963)" (Chinese: 艾德諾東進與德國政策之研究(一九五五~一九六三)). His doctoral dissertation was titled, "The German Question" (德國問題－法律之爭議).

Chang later completed another doctorate in Germany, earning his second Ph.D. from the University of Hamburg in international relations in 1992. His second doctoral dissertation was titled, "Transitions from authoritarianism to democracy in Taiwan: a view from legitimacy".

== Academic career ==
After receiving his two doctorates, Chang taught at Nanhua University until 2003 and is now a professor at National Taiwan University. He has authored over ten books concerning Europe, the Asia-Pacific, and cross-strait relations.

== Political career ==
Chang founded the Democratic Action Alliance in 2004. The alliance was backed by laborers. The organization demonstrated against several of Chen Shui-bian's policies, namely legislative approval of a weapons procurement deal with the United States, and amendments to the Constitution of the Republic of China pertaining to the powers of the National Assembly. In 2005, Chang was elected to the National Assembly representing the Democratic Action Alliance, but resigned on the first day of meetings to protest the National Assembly's formation, as it was convened solely to consider constitutional amendments proposed by the Legislative Yuan that led directly to the National Assembly's suspension. The amendments passed with support from the Kuomintang and Democratic Progressive Party. In 2006, Chang and the Democratic Action Alliance asked that the Kuomintang initiate recall proceedings against party member Hsu Tsai-li, who had been found guilty of corruption while serving as mayor of Keelung.

Chang later became chairman of the Chinese Integration Association. Following the election of Ma Ying-jeou to the presidency in 2008, Chang drafted a "Basic Agreement on Peaceful Cross-Strait Development" to be negotiated with China, published in the Journal of Current Chinese Affairs in 2010. Chang helped organize the Taipei Forum in 2012 to discuss Cross-Strait relations. That same year, Chang was appointed to a government committee to develop new guidelines for high school history textbooks. He also worked as an adviser to three textbook publishing companies. Chang has served as an aide to Hung Hsiu-chu and advised her 2016 presidential campaign. He received credit for developing Hung's "one China, same interpretation" Cross-Strait policy. Chang's own view on Cross-Strait relations has been described as "one China, three constitutions." While Hung served as Kuomintang chairwoman, the party passed a resolution supporting the establishment of the Sun Yat-sen School. The school was founded in March 2017, and Chang was named its president. Chang said later that year that the Sun Yat-sen School would field its own candidates to participate in Kuomintang primaries for local office. The Sun Yat-sen School worked with the 800 Heroes veterans' organization and the National Civil Servant Association, among others, to petition in support of a question regarding pension reductions on the 2018 Taiwanese referendum.

In January 2019, Chang announced that he would be contesting the Kuomintang's nomination for the 2020 presidential election. He finished fifth of five candidates in the 2019 Kuomintang presidential primary won by Han Kuo-yu.

Following Han's loss in the presidential election, Kuomintang chairman Wu Den-yih announced his intention to resign. Before Wu had formally stepped down, Chang became the first to announce his candidacy for the 2020 Kuomintang chairmanship election. Because he had not yet served on the Kuomintang's Central Committee or Central Review Committee, Chang's candidacy was ruled ineligible. In February 2021, the KMT announced that a proposal to appoint Chang to the Central Advisory Committee would be considered during the 21st National Congress. Chang ran in the 2021 Kuomintang chairmanship election, finishing second to Eric Chu. Chang placed fourth of six candidates in the 2025 Kuomintang chairmanship election.
