= Lo Chih-chiang =

Taiwanese politician

- 羅智強
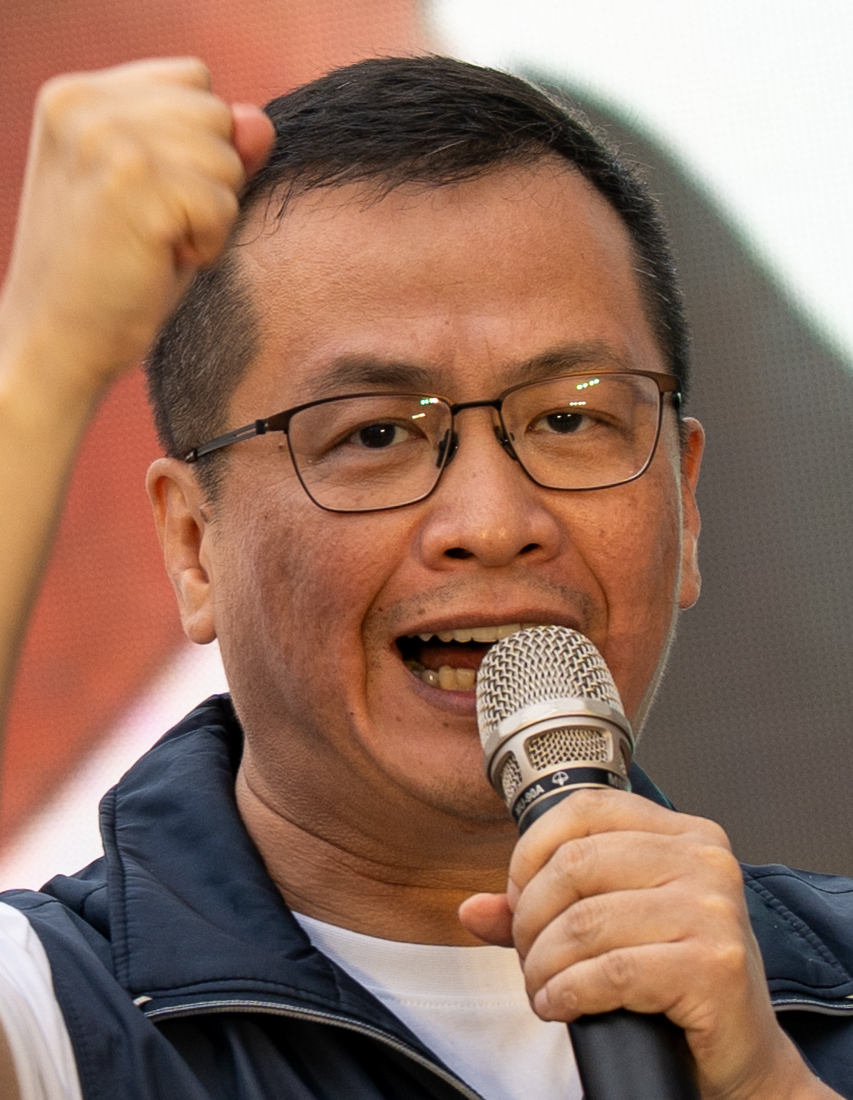
- Lo in 2025

Member of the Legislative Yuan
- Incumbent
- Assumed office February 1, 2024
- Preceded by: Lin Yi-hua

Member of the Taipei City Council
- In office 25 December 2018 – May 11, 2022
- Constituency: Taipei City District 6 (serving Daan-Wenshan)

Director of the KMT Institute of Revolutionary Practice
- Incumbent
- Assumed office 25 March 2020
- Chairman: Johnny Chiang
- Deputies: Yu Shu-hui; Huang Chien-hao
- Preceded by: Lin Huo-wang

Deputy Secretary-General of the ROC Presidential Office
- In office 6 February 2012 – 30 September 2013 Serving with Liu Bao-guey, Hsiung Kuang-hua
- President: Ma Ying-jeou
- Secretary-General: Tseng Yung-chuan; Timothy Yang
- Preceded by: Kao Lang
- Succeeded by: Hsiao Hsu-tsen

2nd Spokesperson of the ROC Presidential Office
- In office 1 March 2010 – 4 May 2011
- President: Ma Ying-jeou
- Preceded by: Wang Yu-chi
- Succeeded by: Fan Chiang Tai-chi

Personal details
- Born: 26 March 1970 (age 56) Hualien City, Hualien County, Taiwan
- Party: Kuomintang
- Other political affiliations: New Party (1994–1998)
- Spouse: Huang Xui-Ling
- Children: 2 daughters
- Education: National Sun Yat-sen University (BBA); National Chengchi University (LLM)
- Website: Foundation website

Lo Chih-chiang (Chinese: 羅智強; pinyin: Luó Zhìqiáng; born 26 March 1970) is a Taiwanese politician. He is a member of the Kuomintang (KMT). From 2010 to 2013, he was first the spokesperson and then the Deputy Secretary-General of the ROC Presidential Office. He was elected to the Taipei City Council in 2018. In 2020, at the invitation of KMT chairman Johnny Chiang, he assumed the directorship of the party school, the Institute of Revolutionary Practice.

== Early life and education ==
Lo was born on 26 March 1970 in Hualien County, Taiwan. His parents were originally from the Dachen Islands off the coast of Zhejiang, China, and relocated to Taiwan during the 1955 Dachen Evacuation. Lo spent his first three years in Dachen First Village (大陳一村), a settlement in Hualien established for evacuees from the islands. His father, Lo Hsia-yu (羅夏玉), whose name was subsequently registered as Lo A-yu (羅阿玉), had been among those evacuated from the islands. After arriving in Taiwan, his father worked in various manual labor jobs, including construction projects, before securing employment as a dockworker at the Port of Keelung.

In 1973, when Lo was three years old, his family moved to Keelung. He was raised in a working-class household, with an older brother and a younger sister. His mother supplemented the family's income by performing handicraft work at home while caring for the children. His family initially lived in a low-income dwelling in Keelung before they were able to afford an apartment, to which the family moved when he was in elementary school.

After graduating from National Keelung Senior High School, Lo enrolled at National Sun Yat-sen University, where he graduated with a bachelor's degree in business administration. As an undergraduate, he became active in the university's debating society. Later, Lo attended law school at National Chengchi University, where he earned a Master of Laws (LL.M.) degree in 2004. His LL.M. thesis was titled, A Study of Disputes Concerning the International Legal Status of the Republic of China.

In February 2010, Lo was enrolled in a doctoral program in diplomacy at National Chengchi University. From 2015 to 2016, he was a visiting scholar at Harvard Law School.

== Political career ==
In 1998, Lo ran unsuccessfully for a seat in the Kaohsiung City Council as an independent, receiving 3000 votes.

=== Political staffer ===
Prior to taking office as the presidential spokesperson, Lo served a spokesperson for the Ma-Siew campaign during the 2008 Taiwanese presidential election and the deputy president of the Central News Agency.

Lo was the deputy campaign manager for Ma Ying-jeou and Wu Den-yih during the 2012 ROC Presidential election.

Lo resigned from his position on 12 September 2013 due to the issues regarding the allegation of the Special Investigation Division of the Supreme Prosecutors' Office against a speaker engaging in influence peddling in a judicial case, as well as other personal and family reasons.

In November 2013, Lo was then awarded the Order of Brilliant Star with Grand Cordon by President Ma for his service in the administration.

=== Political campaigns ===
On 24 February 2018, Lo announced his candidacy for District 6 of the Taipei City Council, which includes both Daan District and Wenshan District. 25 people registered to stand for the election with 13 open seats. On 24 November 2018, as part of the 2018 Taiwanese local elections, Lo won 40,391 votes, 13.69% of the total votes, becoming the highest vote-getter in the 13th Taipei City Council election, and received the highest number of votes in 20 years.

On 26 November 2018, two days after winning his city council campaign, Lo became the first candidate to his intention to contest the Kuomintang nomination for the 2020 Taiwan presidential election through Facebook. He withdrew from the 2019 Kuomintang presidential primary on 7 April 2019.

On 26 January 2020, after reaching 1 million fans on his Facebook Page, Lo fulfilled his earlier promise and announced candidacy for the 2022 Taipei Mayoral election. Lo declared his candidacy for the Taoyuan mayoralty in April 2022, despite the Kuomintang's repeated requests that he delay his announcement. Lo resigned from the Taipei City Council to focus on his mayoral campaign. After a closed-door meeting of the party's Central Standing Committee later that month, Chang San-cheng was formally nominated, despite the interest of Lo and legislators Lu Yu-ling and Lu Ming-che.

=== Leadership positions ===
In 2020, Lo assumed the unpaid voluntary post as the director of the KMT's party school and educational wing, the Institute of Revolutionary Practice Directorship, along with Taipei City Council Member Yu Shu-hui and Taichung City Council Member Huang Chien-hao as the institute's deputy directors. Lo announced the "Future Salon" series, discussions on current events with experts and three to five young audience members as guests. Former President Ma Ying-jeou and Chairman Jonny Chiang were the inaugural guests of the live stream.

== Awards and honors ==
- Order of Brilliant Star with Grand Cordon – Taiwan (Republic of China)
- 2013 HuaiEn Literature Award - HuaiEn Charity Foundation

== Personal life ==
Lo is married to Huang Xui-Ling (Chinese: 黃雪玲) with two daughters.

Government offices
Preceded by Wang Yu-chi	Spokesperson of the Republic of China Presidential Office; 2010–2011	Succeeded by Fan Chiang Tai-chi
Preceded by Kao Lang	Deputy Secretary General to the President of the Republic of China; 2012–2013	Succeeded by Hsiao Hsu-tsen
Party political offices
Preceded by Lin Huo-wang	Director of the KMT Institute of Revolutionary Practice; 2020–Present	Succeeded by Incumbent
