= Taichung Municipal Taichung Second Senior High School =

- 臺中市立臺中第二高級中等學校
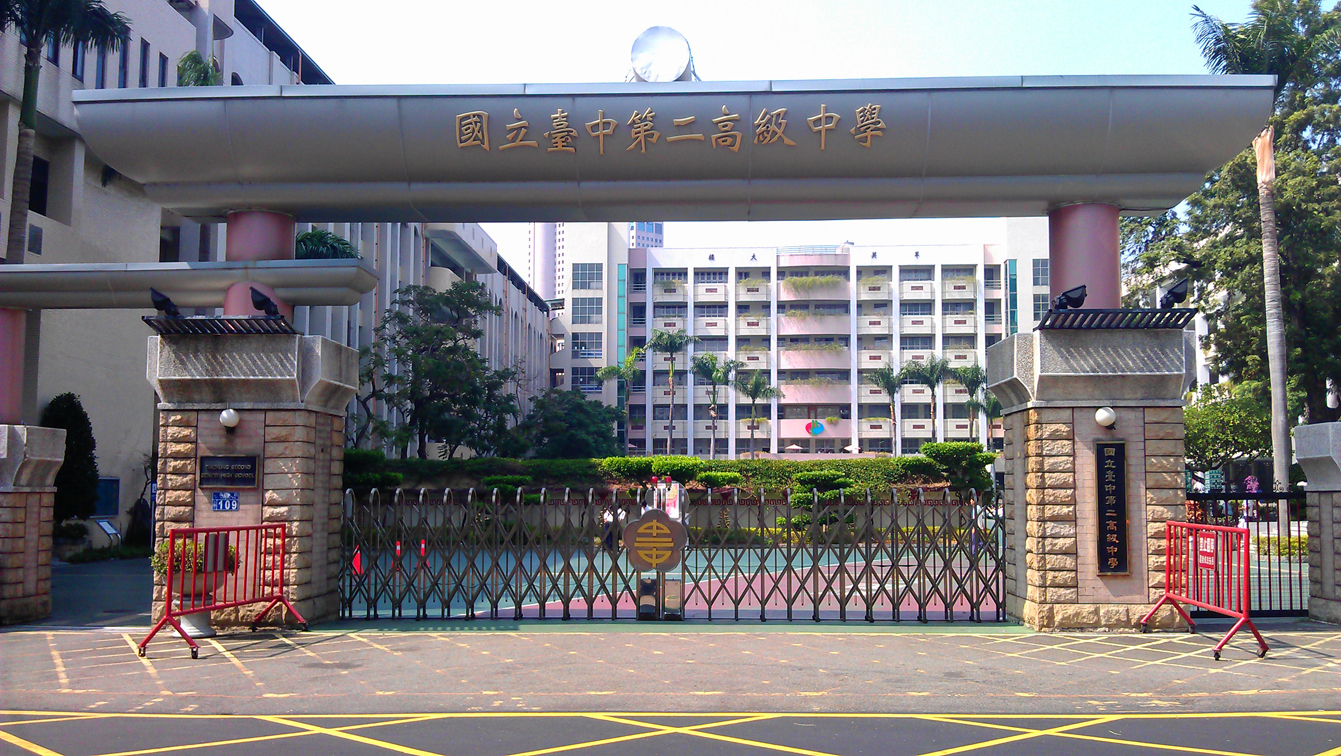
- The Entrance of TCSSH

Location
- No.109, Yingshi Rd., North Dist. Taichung City; 40442; Taiwan
- Coordinates: 24.153056°N 120.675278°E

Information
- School type: Public High School
- Motto: 鷹揚活力 謙恭自省 卓越創新
- Established: 1922 Taichung Prefectural Taichung Second Middle School; 1941 Taichung Prefectural Taichung Second Girl's High School
- Headmaster: Yaowen, Xu
- Grades: Grade 10 to 12
- Enrollment: 2,582
- Campus size: 51394.18 m²
- Campus type: Urban
- Colour
- Team name: TCSSH Baseball Team; TCSSH Volleyball Team; TCSSH Basketball Team; TCSSH Track and Field Team
- Newspaper: Green Olive
- Website: www.tcssh.tc.edu.tw

Taichung Municipal Taichung Second Senior High School is a senior high school located in Taichung City, Taiwan. Founded in 1922 by the Governor-General of Taiwan, it was named "Taichung Second Middle School", a school that recruited Japanese students during the Japan period. Now it is a member of "Taichung Big 5" alliance.

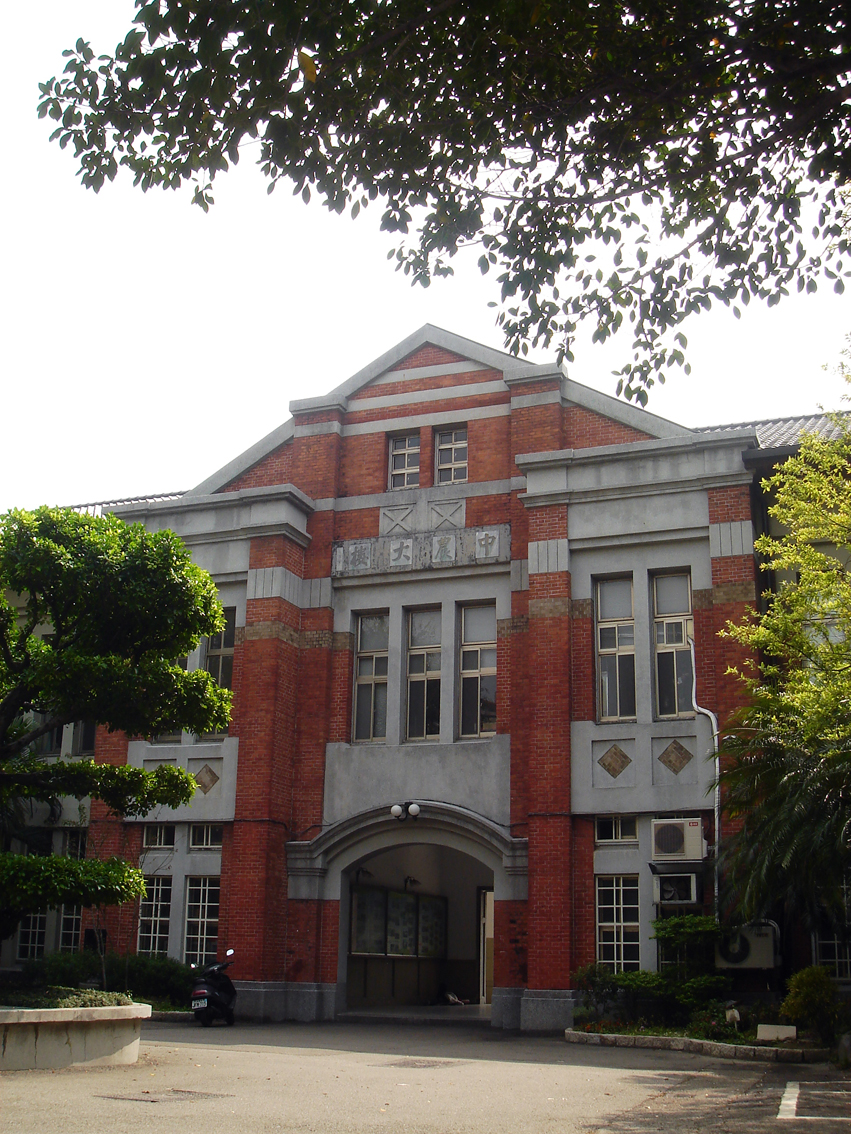
Front building of school during Japanese occupation

== History ==
The predecessor was "Taichung Prefectural Taichung Second Middle School" founded in 1922 and "Taichung Prefectural Taichung Second Girls' High School" in 1941. The former was mainly for Japanese students, while the latter was for Taiwanese. After the end of World War II, Japanese students were transferred to the two, and they(Japanese students and staffs) were then repatriated to Japan in 1946. Later, it was named as "Provincial Taichung Second Middle school" and "Provincial Taichung Second Girls' Middle School" by Nationalist government. After the merger, the campus of the former was given to an agricultural school.

- In 1922, based on the "New Taiwan Education Order" promulgated by Den Kenjirō, the school was established in Taichū Prefecture. At the beginning, it was a school recruiting Japanese students. Since there was already a school called "Taichung First Middle School", it is named after "second".
- In 1941, Taichung Prefectural Taichung Second Girls' High School was established at the current campus.
- In 1945, after the end of World War II, there were more than 500 Japanese students and 40 faculty members remaining at the school. The students of the second girls' high school were transferred to Taichung First Girls' High School. And the students of the latter transferred to the former.
- In the spring of 1946, all Japanese students were repatriated to Japan, and the two schools were therefore closed.
- In the autumn of 1946, Taichung Second Middle School was merged with Taichung Second Girls' Middle School. And it was re-established at the current position. The original site was given to Taichung Agricultural School.
- In July 1952, stopped recruiting girls.
- In the autumn of 1955, according to the evacuation plan, a branch was created in Taiping District, Taichung
- In 1968, ended the Taiping Division.
- In August 1969, the name was changed to "Provincial Taichung Second Senior High School".
- In November 1982, musical experimental class was set up.
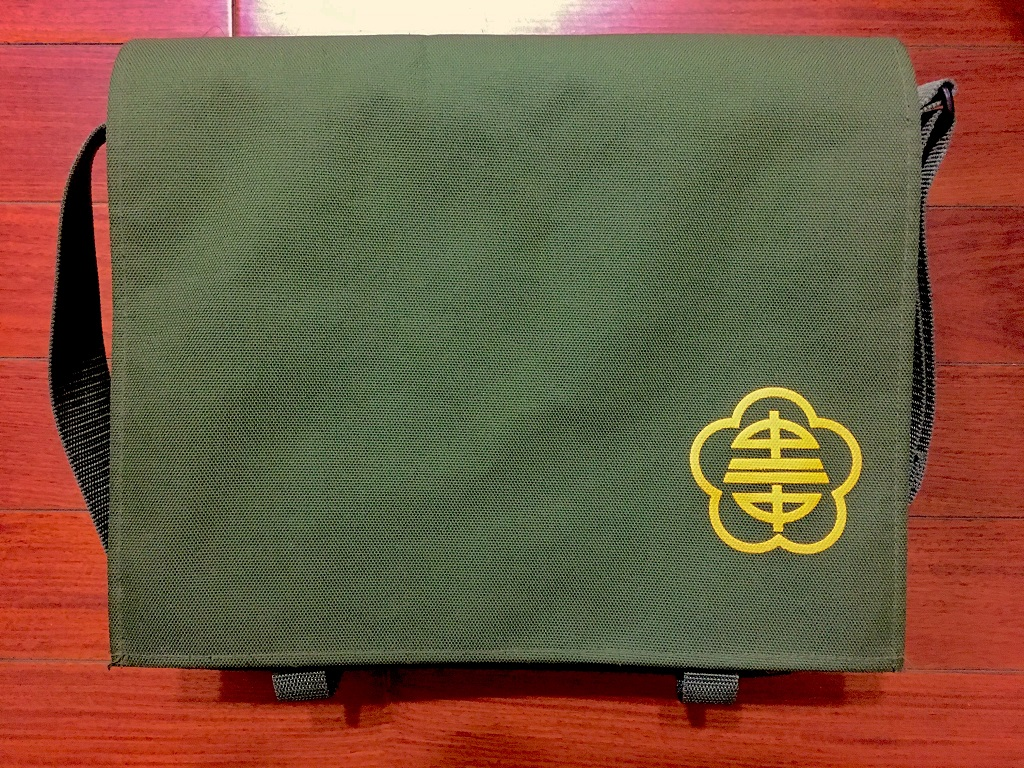
  School Bag
- In 1983, re-admission of girls. Became a high school for boys and girls again.
- In August 1995, special educational class was established.
- On 1 February 2000, it was reorganised into "National Taichung Second Senior High School".
- In March 2003, arithmetic and literary class were set up.
- In December 2012, the 90th anniversary of the school.
- In December 2014, the new stadium was completed and opened.
- In January 2017, the school name was changed to "Taichung Municipal Taichung Second Senior High School".
- On 11 December 2017, concluded with Hyogo Itami High School from Japan. This is the first sister school ever.

== Partner schools ==
- United States: Bedford High School (New Hampshire)
- France: Lycée François Magendie
- Japan: Hyogo Itami High School

== School song ==
=== Japanese Occupation ===
台中州立台中第二中学校校歌 〈黒潮の歌〉 作者不明

1

黒潮南に さすところ 椰子の葉茂る 南海に

萌ゆる胸底 奥深く 見よや乾坤 つんざきて

緑の色も おごそかに 振るう健児の 意気高し

2

紫こむる 新高に 旭光燦然 輝きて

鵬翼図南の 意気高く 健児の血潮は 高鳴りぬ

鍛えし鉄の この腕 磨く剣に 光あり

3

千秋夢を 包みつつ 太平の波 轟きて

我等健児の 雄叫びは 天来自由の 調べなり

鋼（はがね）のごとく もる肉は 勝利の力 あふれたり

4

水源地頭 たそがれて 八千の峰 洋洋と

秋空高く 暮れゆけど 勝利の夢は なおさめず

歌え若き 日の歌を 振れ喜びの 応援旗

== Previous headmasters and headmistresses ==
=== Japanese Occupation (1922-1945) ===
1. Mr. Kyutaro Yanagisawa: 1 April 1922 to 28 May 1930

2. Mr. Itagaki 46th: 28 May 1930 to 2 April 1937

3. Mr. Masao Yoshikata: 2 April 1937 to 6 April 1940

4. Mr. Yogo Goto: 6 April 1940 to 1 April 1942

5. Mr. Takamaru Spirit: 1 April 1942 to 1945 (Receipt of Taiwan by the Republic of China)

=== Republic of China (1945-) ===
1. Mr. Jin Shurong: January 1945 to July 1946

2. Mrs. Yu Liping: January 1946 to July 1946

3. Mr. Lou Xian: August 1946 to January 1947

4. Mr. Chen Yusun: January 1947 to July 1949

5. Mr. Pan Zhenqiu: August 1949 to July 1950

6. Mr. Luo Renjie: August 1950 to July 1958

7. Mr. Han Baojian: August 1958 to July 1959

8. Mr. Song Hongyu: August 1959 to July 1963

9. Mr. Shi Linsheng: August 1963 to February 1965

10. Mr. Tang Xiaobin: March 1965 to July 1970

11. Mr. Sun Hongzhang: August 1970 to January 1985

12. Mr. Chen Yiming: February 1985 to August 1992

13. Mr. Cai Jinzhong: August 1992 to January 1999

14. Mr. Hong Qiusen: February 1999 to January 2004

15. Mr. Xue Guangfeng: February 2004 to July 2012

16. Mr. He Fucai: August 2012 to July 2018

17. Mr. Xu Yaowen: 2018~

== See also ==
- Education in Taiwan
