= 2021 Kuomintang chairmanship election =

- 25 September 2021
- Turnout: 50.71% (▲14.86%)
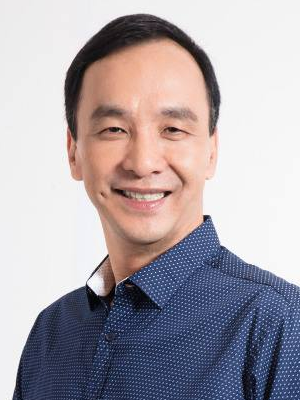

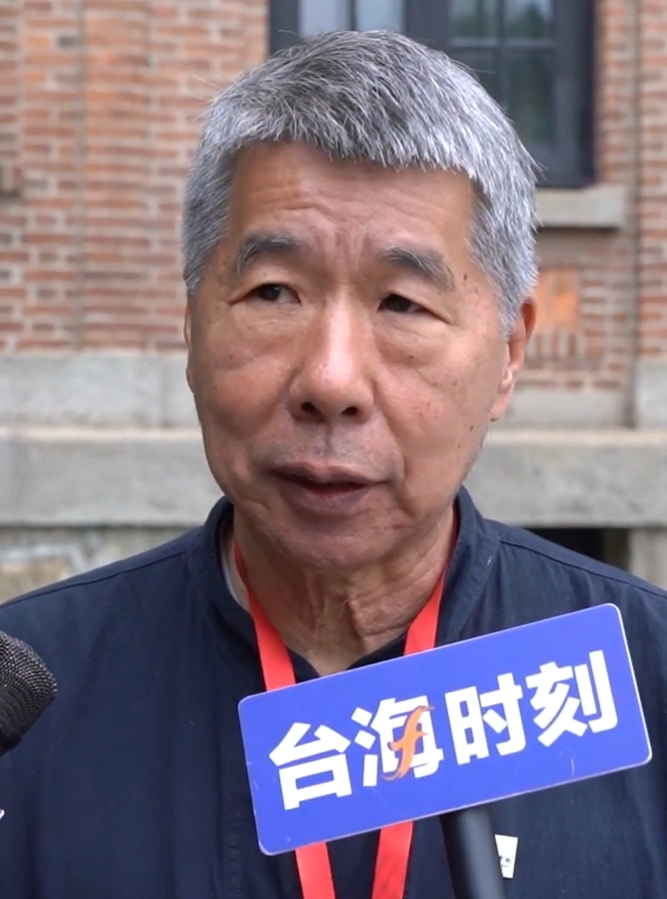

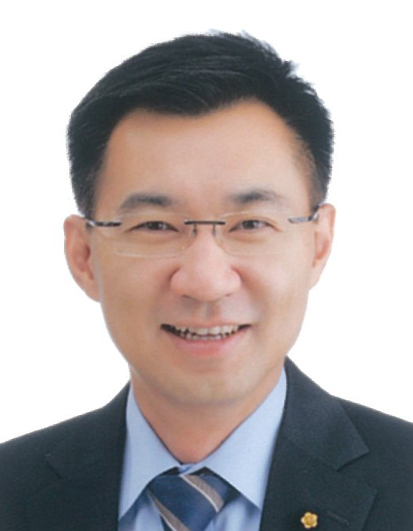

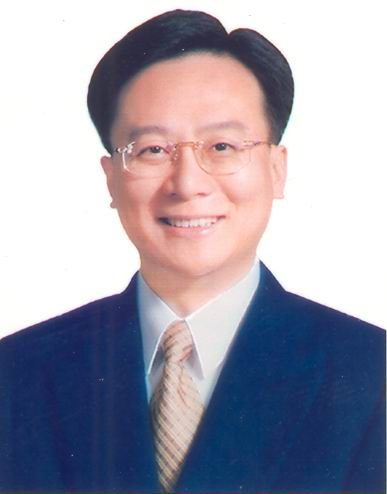
Nominee	Eric Chu	Chang Ya-chung
Popular vote	85,163	60,631
Percentage	45.78%	32.59%
Nominee	Johnny Chiang	Cho Po-yuan
Popular vote	35,093	5,133
Percentage	18.87%	2.76%
- County level units won by Eric Chu. County level units won by Chang Ya-chung. County level units won by Johnny Chiang.
Chairman before election
Johnny Chiang
Elected Chairman
Eric Chu

The 2021 Kuomintang chairmanship election (Chinese: 2021年中國國民黨主席選舉) was scheduled to be held in July 2021. It was postponed due to the COVID-19 pandemic, and eventually rescheduled for 25 September 2021. It was the tenth direct election of the party leader in Kuomintang (KMT) history. All registered, due-paying KMT party members were eligible to vote.

== Candidates ==
Jaw Shaw-kong applied to renew his Kuomintang party membership in February 2021, and expressed interest in contesting the party leadership. In response, the National Communications Commission noted that the Broadcasting Corporation of China could be fined under Article 5-1 of the Radio and Television Act if Jaw simultaneously held leadership positions in a political party and a radio or television media enterprise. After formally attaining party membership, Jaw reiterated that he would run for the chairmanship. As candidates for the party chairmanship must have served on the Kuomintang's Central Committee or Central Advisory Committee, the KMT announced that a proposal to appoint Jaw to the Central Advisory Committee would be considered during the 21st National Congress. Jaw decided not to run for the party leadership on 28 April 2021.

On 20 February 2021, incumbent chair Johnny Chiang stated that he would run for a full term as party leader.

Cho Po-yuan announced his campaign for the party leadership on 11 July 2021.

On 2 August 2021, Eric Chu stated that he would seek the Kuomintang chairmanship, a position he had previously held from 2015 to 2016. Chu promised to reestablish a polling department within the party if he were reelected chairman.

== Election scheduling and candidate registration ==
The chairmanship election was scheduled for 24 July 2021, and was to be held alongside delegate elections for the Kuomintang's 21st National Congress. Registration of eligible candidates was to take place on 3 or 4 June, and completed registration forms were to be received on either 7 or 8 June. Candidacy processing fees were charged for the first time during the 2021 leadership election; each campaign was expected to pay a total of NT$13.2 million. Following a meeting of the KMT's Central Standing Committee on 26 May 2021, committee members decided to postpone the leadership election due to the effects of the COVID-19 pandemic. During an in-person meeting on 28 July 2021, the Central Standing Committee decided to reschedule the chairmanship election for 25 September 2021. Registration forms were available to eligible candidates on 12 and 13 August. The two-day period to accept completed forms was extended to 16 or 17 August.

Eric Chu registered his candidacy on 16 August, and afterwards, outlined several goals for the party leader: empower the Kuomintang legislative caucus, expand international and Cross-Strait outreach, focus on younger party members, and win both the 2022 local and 2024 presidential elections. Johnny Chiang, Chang Ya-chung, and Cho Po-yuan registered their candidacies the next day. Chiang described a number of his objectives and vowed to step down if any one was not met. Chiang promised to build intraparty consensus and improve communication between its members. He sought passage of the questions proposed by the Kuomintang in the 2021 Taiwanese referendum, to win a total of fifteen mayoral or magisterial seats in the 2022 local elections, and claim a legislative majority in the 2024 Taiwanese legislative election, led by the selection of "star" candidates on the Kuomintang party list. As a "kingmaker," Chiang committed to helping the party choose its presidential candidate. Regarding Cross-Strait relations, Chiang suggested convening a committee to advise the party on the topic, as well as naming a representative of the party to promote relations.

== Debates ==
A televised debate between the four candidates took place on 4 September. Chiang again stressed his role as a kingmaker during the presidential election, stating that he would not run for the post himself. He regarded the maintenance of peace and safety as vital to Cross-Strait relations, and said that the Kuomintang needed to offer more opportunities to its younger members. In his remarks, Chu expressed the belief that the elected chairman must focus on consolidation of party strengths against the Democratic Progressive Party. To Chu, the kingmaker role would be served by a stronger KMT. Chu commented that the party must participate in Cross-Strait interactions, and focus on social exchanges with China, to show the public the party's commitment to peace, prosperity and safety. He also vowed to create opportunities for younger party members. Chang criticized Chiang and Chu for making intangible and empty promises. Chang's main goal was to sign a peace treaty with Beijing, if the Kuomintang won a legislative majority in 2024. Chang also advocated for a China-based office to be established, in order to help Taiwanese expatriates in China. Cho felt that young Kuomintang members deserved attention and respect from a selfless and professional party leader, and stated that, if elected, he would invite Chinese Communist Party general secretary Xi Jinping to Taiwan for a summit on Cross-Strait relations. A group of Taiwan independence activists led by the Taiwan Republic Office gathered outside the TVBS Media building, where the debate was held, in protest, shouting slogans at each of the four chairperson candidates. Chang responded to the protesters by giving a thumbs-down sign.

On 13 September, the Kuomintang's Central Election Supervision Committee referred Chang to the party's Central Evaluation and Disciplinary Committee, reasoning that Chang had made multiple verbal attacks on Chu during the campaign. Both Chiang and Chu opposed the election committee's decision, and a proposal to rescind the action, initiated by Chang's committee representative Chen Ming-yi, was passed two days later.

A livestreamed debate on party policy was held at China Television studios on 17 September, during which the 1992 Consensus was a primary topic. Chiang stated that the "original definition of the consensus" should be restored, and that objections to the consensus itself had been reduced because the Democratic Progressive Party was unable to manage Cross-Strait relations. Cho was also critical of the DPP, believing that strained relations were due to the DPP abandonment of the consensus. In turn, Chu said that, during a 2015 meeting with Xi Jinping, he had emphasized his position that the consensus allowed Taiwan and China to have different interpretations of the term "One-China." Chu backed the "creative ambiguity" of the consensus. Chang opined that the consensus was one of the Kuomintang's guiding principles, but that he would seek to negotiate a memorandum of understanding for peace with the Chinese Communist Party. Chu objected to Chang, expressing concern that Chang's actions would rapidly unify China and Taiwan.

== Election ==
Polls were open from 8 a.m. to 4 p.m. on 25 September 2021. Eric Chu received 85,164 of 187,999 votes cast, finishing ahead of Chang Ya-chung (60,632 votes), Johnny Chiang (35,090 votes), and Cho Po-yuan (5,133 votes). Voter turnout was 50.71 percent. The election results were confirmed by the Kuomintang's Central Standing Committee on 29 September. Although Central Standing Committee member Lin Chin-chieh suggested that Chu take office as soon as possible, the committee voted for Chu to assume the chairmanship on 5 October 2021. Chu was duly inaugurated as chairman on that date.

== Reactions ==
In his capacity as General Secretary of the Chinese Communist Party, Xi Jinping wrote a letter congratulating Eric Chu on winning the Kuomintang chairmanship. The message referred to the 1992 Consensus, and expressed hope for Cross-Strait peace, unification, and rejuvenation of the Chinese nation. Chu's response to Xi acknowledged that peace had been kept due to recognition of the consensus between the Kuomintang and Chinese Communist Party in the past, unlike the Democratic Progressive Party's "anti-China" policies and actions promoting "desinicization." Taiwan's Mainland Affairs Council described Chu's reply to Xi as "cater[ing] to the CCP while ignoring the facts." The Democratic Progressive Party criticized Chu's acknowledgement of Xi, stating that no party leader in a democracy would expect commendation from autocratic government leaders elsewhere.

== Opinion polling ==
Date	Pollster	Sample size	Chang Ya-chung	Johnny Chiang	Cho Po-yuan	Eric Chu
9–13 September 2021	TVBS	1,257	30.6	12.8	0.9	27.5
22–23 September 2021	Trend Survey	818	28.4	18.0	1.8	29.3

== Results ==
Results of the 2021 Kuomintang chairmanship election
No.	Candidate	Votes	%
1	Johnny Chiang	35,093	18.87%
2	Cho Po-yuan	5,133	2.76%
3	Chang Ya-chung	60,631	32.59%
4	Eric Chu	85,163	45.78%
Eligible voters		370,711	
Total votes		188,000	
Valid votes		186,020	
Invalid votes		1,980	
Turnout		50.71%	

Results by administrative area
Subdivision	Eligible Voters	Total Votes	Turnout	Valid Votes	Invalid Votes	Johnny Chiang		Cho Po-yuan		Chang Ya-chung		Eric Chu	
Subdivision	Eligible Voters	Total Votes	Turnout	Valid Votes	Invalid Votes	Votes	%	Votes	%	Votes	%	Votes	%
Taipei City	45,202	17,386	38.46%	17,254	132	2,054	11.90%	234	1.36%	7,355	42.63%	7,611	44.11%
New Taipei City	41,483	19,693	47.47%	19,522	171	2,712	13.89%	239	1.22%	6,987	35.79%	9,584	49.09%
Keelung City	6,305	2,427	38.49%	2,402	25	363	15.11%	27	1.12%	872	36.30%	1,140	47.46%
Yilan County	6,897	3,594	52.11%	3,567	27	533	14.94%	54	1.51%	1,055	29.58%	1,925	53.97%
Taoyuan City	26,266	12,625	48.07%	12,522	103	1,229	9.81%	143	1.14%	4,801	38.34%	6,349	50.70%
Hsinchu County	9,085	5,771	63.52%	5,712	59	749	13.11%	82	1.44%	1,730	30.29%	3,151	55.16%
Hsinchu City	8,561	3,636	42.47%	3,600	36	623	17.31%	58	1.61%	1,548	43.00%	1,371	38.08%
Miaoli County	11,185	7,231	64.65%	7,140	91	1,365	19.12%	102	1.43%	2,044	28.63%	3,629	50.83%
Taichung City	31,814	18,592	58.44%	18,377	215	8,162	44.41%	332	1.81%	5,230	28.46%	4,653	25.32%
Changhua County	20,802	13,060	62.78%	12,902	158	2,664	20.65%	2,387	18.50%	2,656	20.59%	5,195	40.27%
Nantou County	9,322	5,018	53.83%	4,970	48	1,144	23.02%	145	2.92%	1,468	29.54%	2,213	44.53%
Yunlin County	9,970	6,493	65.13%	6,420	73	801	12.48%	113	1.76%	1,185	18.46%	4,321	67.31%
Chiayi County	7,619	3,428	44.99%	3,401	27	550	16.17%	86	2.53%	843	24.79%	1,922	56.51%
Chiayi City	6,224	2,361	37.93%	2,331	30	390	16.73%	48	2.06%	888	38.10%	1,005	43.11%
Tainan City	25,471	12,543	49.24%	12,409	134	1,965	15.84%	245	1.97%	3,593	28.95%	6,607	53.24%
Kaohsiung City	45,799	24,260	52.97%	23,963	297	4,345	18.13%	405	1.69%	9,221	38.48%	9,992	41.70%
Pingtung County	20,813	12,908	62.02%	12,737	171	1,810	14.21%	179	1.41%	3,408	26.76%	7,340	57.63%
Hualien County	10,594	6,524	61.58%	6,454	70	1,420	22.00%	76	1.18%	1,994	30.90%	2,964	45.93%
Taitung County	7,897	3,875	49.07%	3,839	36	513	13.36%	70	1.82%	1,343	34.98%	1,913	49.83%
Penghu County	3,718	1,752	47.12%	1,711	41	333	19.46%	44	2.57%	457	26.71%	877	51.26%
Kinmen County	3,433	1,871	54.50%	1,866	5	276	14.79%	27	1.45%	824	44.16%	739	39.60%
Lienchiang County	799	458	57.32%	453	5	83	18.32%	7	1.55%	155	34.22%	208	45.92%
Overseas	11,452	2,493	21.77%	2,467	26	1,009	40.90%	30	1.22%	974	39.48%	454	18.40%
