= 2020 Taiwanese presidential election =

- 11 January 2020
- Opinion polls
- Registered: 19,311,105
- Turnout: 74.90% (▲8.63pp)
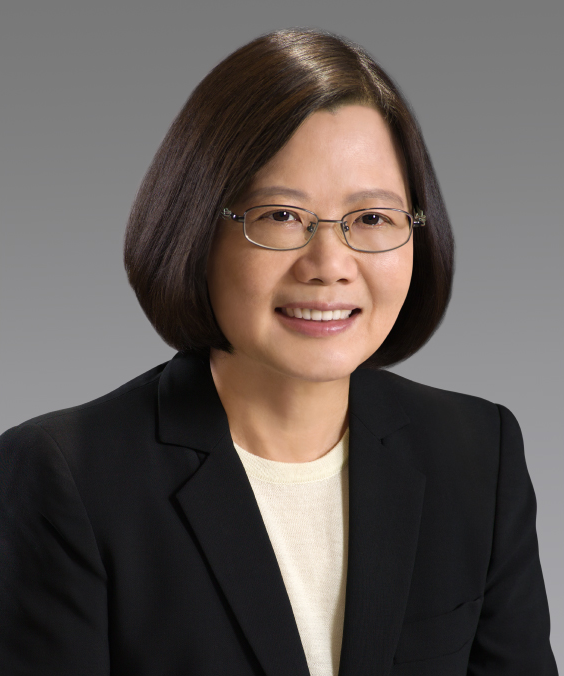

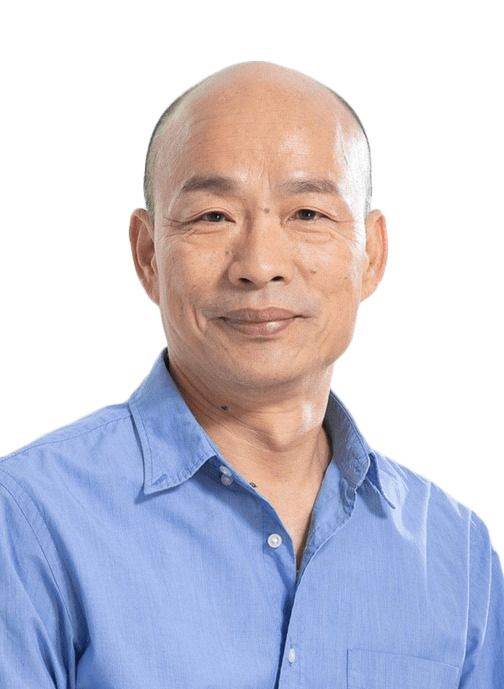
Nominee	Tsai Ing-wen	Han Kuo-yu
Party	DPP	KMT
Running mate	Lai Ching-te	Chang San-cheng
Popular vote	8,170,231	5,522,119
Percentage	57.13%	38.61%
President before election
Tsai Ing-wen
DPP
Elected President
Tsai Ing-wen
DPP

Presidential elections were held in Taiwan on 11 January 2020 alongside Legislative Yuan election. Incumbent president Tsai Ing-wen and former premier Lai Ching-te of the Democratic Progressive Party (DPP) won the election, defeating Kaohsiung mayor Han Kuo-yu of the Kuomintang (KMT) and his running mate Chang San-cheng, as well as third-party candidate James Soong.

Following major losses during the 2018 Taiwanese local elections, Tsai Ing-wen resigned from her party's chairmanship and was challenged in the primary contest by former Premier Lai Ching-te, himself a former Tsai appointee. The Kuomintang also ran a competitive primary, which saw Han Kuo-yu, initially reluctant to run, defeat former presidential candidate and New Taipei mayor Eric Chu, and Foxconn chief executive Terry Gou.

Both domestic issues and Cross-Strait relations featured in the campaign, with Han attacking Tsai for her perceived failures in labour reform, economic management, and dealing with corruption of her aides. However, Tsai's strong response to Beijing's increasing pressures on Taiwan to accede to a unification agreement, amid the backdrop of the intensely followed Hong Kong anti-extradition protests, proved crucial in her recapturing broad support.

The elections had a turnout of 74.9%, the highest among nationwide elections since 2008. Tsai won re-election in a landslide victory with a record 8.17 million votes, representing 57.1% of the popular vote, the highest vote share won by a DPP candidate in presidential elections. The DPP received a higher share of the vote in major metropolitan areas, reversing the KMT's fortunes in Kaohsiung and environs, while the Kuomintang retained strength in limited eastern regions and off-island constituencies. Tsai and Lai were inaugurated on 20 May 2020.

== Eligibility ==
Presidential candidates and vice presidential running mates are elected on the same ticket, using first-past-the-post voting. This was the seventh direct election of the president and vice president, the posts having previously been indirectly elected by the National Assembly until 1996.

Under applicable legislation, any party which received more than five per cent of the total vote share in the latest election in any level were eligible to contest the election. The Democratic Progressive Party (DPP), Kuomintang (KMT), New Power Party (NPP) and People First Party (PFP) were eligible, though in the end only three major-party candidates were certified: incumbent President Tsai Ing-wen of the Democratic Progressive Party, Kaohsiung mayor Han Kuo-yu of Kuomintang, and perennial veteran candidate James Soong of the People First Party. Vice President Chen Chien-jen, Tsai's running mate in 2016, was eligible for re-election but chose not to contest.

== Background ==
Tsai Ing-wen suffered a stinging defeat during the 2018 Taiwanese local elections due to widespread discontentment over numerous domestic policy issues, including public pension reform, same-sex marriage, pollution, and labour reform. In the lead up to the election, her staffers were found to have been implicated in a tobacco smuggling ring, which also allegedly involved the top management of flag carrier China Airlines and National Security Bureau. Dogged by scandal and having lost on major referendums questions, Tsai's clout continued to deteriorate both in her own party and more broadly.

The major inflection of the campaign came amid the Hong Kong anti-extradition bill protests, an event that was triggered with the murder of Poon Hiu-wing in Taiwan. As the protests became heated over the later half of 2019, Tsai began to portray the situation in Hong Kong as a direct result of an encroachment of the territory's autonomy from Beijing. In January 2019, Xi Jinping, General Secretary of the Chinese Communist Party, had announced an open letter to Taiwan proposing a one country, two systems formula for eventual unification. Additionally, over the course of 2019, several small nations that previously had diplomatic ties to Taiwan, including Panama, Kiribati, and Solomon Islands, broke off relations in favour of China. Tsai issued pronouncements that Taiwan will "never accept one country, two systems" and that "today's Hong Kong could be tomorrow's Taiwan".

Tsai reconciled with diverse elements in her party in signing up Lai to be her running mate. Kuomintang, after fits and starts over procedural disputes, flirted with a high-profile nomination of Foxconn chief Terry Gou. The party ultimately nominated firebrand Han Kuo-yu, who had in 2018 successfully run an insurgent mayoral campaign in the DPP stronghold of Kaohsiung. However, his combative, eccentric antics and participation in the presidential election soon after his taking on the post in Kaohsiung earned him scorn from detractors. Additionally, Tsai made hay with Han's perceived friendliness with Beijing, citing his early 2019 visit to mainland China where he met with multiple high-level Communist Party officials, and his continued recognition of the 1992 Consensus, which Tsai had disavowed. Han eventually spoke out against one country, two systems, remarking that it will never happen if he was president unless it was "over my dead body." Nonetheless, Tsai's political advantage on the issue had been solidified.

In November 2019, Chinese defector (William) Wang Liqiang claimed that Beijing used internet operatives to tilt elections in favor of the KMT and Han Kuo-yu in particular, similar to how the Russians had interfered with U.S. elections. It became an international scandal after being reported by leading Australian news outlets 60 Minutes, The Age, and The Sydney Morning Herald, dominating the newscycle in Taiwan. Taiwanese authorities subsequently detained two executives, alleged by Wang to be spies, of a Hong Kong company. In late December, the KMT was mired deeper by the scandal after Australian intelligence revealed that KMT officials had tried to bribe and threaten Wang into recanting his testimony and framing the DPP as the mastermind behind the entire incident. KMT spokesperson denied the report, and both parties traded blames.

== Nominations ==
=== Democratic Progressive Party ===
Incumbent President Tsai Ing-wen's re-election chances were dealt a blow after the Democratic Progressive Party's devastating defeat in the 2018 local elections, where the DPP lost seven of the 13 cities and counties it previously held. The DPP’s share of the vote also fell from 56 to 39 per cent since the 2016 presidential election. Tsai resigned as the party chairwoman after the defeat. However, Tsai kept trailing behind in the polls as the surveys found most Taiwanese would not support Tsai in the 2020 election but would support Premier Lai Ching-te, who also resigned from the premiership for the electoral defeat in January 2019.

On 19 February 2019, Tsai Ing-wen told CNN in an interview she will run for re-election, despite facing calls from senior members of her own party to not seek re-election. Before her announcement, Tsai had received a bump in the polls after she gave a robust speech saying that her people would never relinquish their democratic freedoms, as a response to the General Secretary of the Chinese Communist Party Xi Jinping's speech in January describing Taiwan's unification with the mainland as "inevitable".

On 18 March, Lai Ching-te registered to run in the party's presidential primary, saying that he could shoulder the responsibility of leading Taiwan in defending itself from being annexed by China. This is the first time in history where a serious primary challenge has been mounted against a sitting president.

Tsai was duly nominated by the DPP on 19 June 2019. She and Lai Ching-te formed the DPP presidential ticket on 17 November 2019.

==== Nominees ====
2020 Democratic Progressive ticket
Tsai Ing-wen	Lai Ching-te
for President	for Vice President
President of the Republic of China (since 2016)	Premier of the Republic of China (2017–2019)

==== Candidates ====
Lai Ching-te

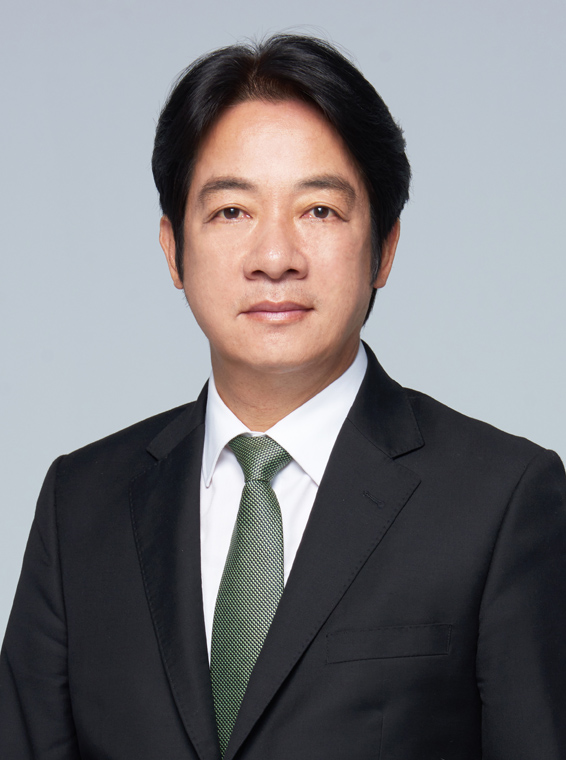

Premier of the Republic of China
(2017–2019)
LN: June 13, 2019

=== Kuomintang ===
Former Kuomintang chairman and 2016 presidential candidate Eric Chu announced that he would run in the 2020 presidential race when he stepped down on 25 December 2018 as Mayor of New Taipei City, becoming the first big-name politician to throw his hat in the ring. Former President of the Legislative Yuan Wang Jin-pyng also announced his presidential bid on 7 March. Other candidates included former Deputy Secretary-General of the Presidential Office and incumbent Taipei City Councillor Lo Chih-chiang and National Taiwan University professor Chang Ya-chung who have also announced their candidacies.

The party has decided to hold its primary based on a 70-30 weighing of public polls and party member votes, although it has not ruled out the possibility of drafting the strongest candidate in an all-out effort to win back power, which was seen to be reserved for the party's best performing candidate in the polls, Mayor of Kaohsiung Han Kuo-yu. Several KMT heavyweights such as party chairman Wu Den-yih and even former President Ma Ying-jeou were believed to also be interested in running for the party's presidential nomination. Wu Den-yih’s withdrew his proposal to only allow KMT members to decide the party’s presidential candidate which drew criticism, with some questioning whether he aimed to rig the game for himself, before he declined to run on 11 April.

On 17 April, founder and chairman of Foxconn Terry Gou announced his presidential bid by joining the KMT presidential primary. He also stated that he would not accept to be drafted to run. Han, Gou's potential rival, announced on 23 April that he was "willing to take responsibility" for the development of Taiwan but was "unable" to participate in the party's primary in its current form. He expressed his disapproval of the "closed-door negotiations" within the party and called for reform. In order to settle the demand from Han's supporters, the party adopted a resolution to put in place special guidelines to include all its presidential hopefuls, including Han, in its primary on the next day, and also switch the primary method from 70-30 weighing of public polls and party member votes to fully being determined by public polls.

On 15 July, Han Kuo-yu was announced to have won the party's poll in a press conference by KMT Vice Chairman Tseng Yung-chuan. On 11 November, independent Chang San-cheng joined Kuomintang presidential ticket as the vice presidential candidate. Kuomintang ticket completed registration for the election on 18 November 2019.

==== Nominees ====
2020 Kuomintang ticket
Han Kuo-yu	Chang San-cheng
for President	for Vice President
Mayor of Kaohsiung (2018–2020)	Premier of the Republic of China (2016)

==== Candidates ====
Terry Gou	Eric Chu	Chou Hsi-wei	Chang Ya-chung	Wang Jin-pyng	Lo Chih-chiang
Chairman of Foxconn (1974–2019)	Mayor of New Taipei (2010–2018)	Magistrate of Taipei County (2005–2010)	National Taiwan University Professor (2001–present)	President of the Legislative Yuan (1999–2016)	Taipei City Councillor (2018–present)
LN: July 15, 2019	LN: July 15, 2019	LN: July 15, 2019	LN: July 15, 2019	W: June 6, 2019	W: April 7, 2019

=== People First Party ===
On 13 November 2019, People First Party chairperson James Soong announced his fourth bid for president, along with his running mate, independent and former United Communications Group chairwoman Sandra Yu.

==== Nominees ====
2020 People First ticket
James Soong	Sandra Yu
for President	for Vice President
Governor of Taiwan (1994–1998)	United Communications Group chairwoman (2009–2018)

=== Other parties and independents ===
==== Withdrawn candidates ====
- Chang San-cheng, President of the Executive Yuan (2016)
- Yang Shih-kuang, Television presenter and New Party Youth Corps leader
- Annette Lu, Vice President of the Republic of China (2000–2008)

== Suspected Chinese influence ==
In 2019, the Taiwanese National Security Bureau stated that several Taiwanese media outlets were collaborating with China. Employees of pro-Han China Times and CTiTV said they received instructions from the Taiwan Affairs Office on certain issues.

Several Taiwanese websites published Chinese propaganda about Tsai and Han. False information was circulated on Facebook and YouTube that appeared to have come from China. Other disinformation efforts seemed to be designed to create voter apathy or promote Han. Much of the activity was not directed by Beijing but came from scattered groups of Chinese netizens.

Wang Liqiang, a self-confessed Chinese spy who defected to Australia, alleged that he had helped with funneling 20 million yuan in campaign donations from China to Han's campaign. Han denied the allegation.

China's efforts to influence the election were exposed by Taiwanese and foreign media outlets. Thousands protested on the streets against what they feared to be "red media". Prior to the election, Tsai highlighted China's meddling in Hong Kong and Taiwan, saying, "Young people in Hong Kong have used their lives and blood and tears to show us that 'one country, two systems' is not feasible."

== Debates ==
A single television debate was held on 29 December 2019 at 2 PM local time. Most of the themes discussed had already been elaborated upon by the candidates during the policy presentations in the weeks immediately prior to the debate. As usual, Cross-Strait relations was a focal point of conversation; the candidates also touched upon military spending, nuclear energy, labour relations, and special interests. Tsai reiterated her commitment to the cross-strait status quo, without "unnecessary provocations" or changes in policy. Han said he would protect the "sovereignty of the Republic of China". James Soong said that Taiwan has inherited Chinese culture and tradition but insists that any changes to the island's political status needed to be achieved via "democratic means."

Han used the debate to paint Tsai variously as being at the mercy of the "New Tide" ultra-progressive wing of her own party, a dictatorial and autocratic figure as president, a leader unable to effectively control her allegedly corrupt subordinates, and a flip-flopper on the issue of cross-strait relations. Tsai said that Han did not have concrete policies of his own and focused undue attention on attacks against her. Tsai acknowledged the DPP's poor performance in the local elections of 2018 but reiterated her position that she was the best candidate to protect against perceived encroachment of sovereignty from the PRC; she repeatedly invoked One Country, Two Systems, suggesting that Han would accede to China's position on the issue, and in her closing remarks said "do not let Taiwan be the next Hong Kong". Tsai and Han each accused the other of using internet trolls, so-called "cyber armies", to smear the other. While Tsai accused Han of being prejudiced towards marginalized groups, Han tried to brand Tsai as an out-of-touch elitist and himself an everyman who will happily go "have street food" with the common folk as president. James Soong attempted to strike a middle ground, repeating his support for the status quo in cross-strait relations, calling for mutual understanding with the mainland, and denying his own family's connections to mainland business interests.

The debate was noted for some bizarre exchanges involving Han Kuo-yu, who became especially animated on multiple occasions, raising his voice and using wild hand gestures, most notably yelling the phrase “Long live the Republic of China!” three times, in addition to employing props to complement his attacks on Tsai. In response to questions from Apple Daily on the relationship between Han and a woman he allegedly had an extramarital affair with, Han called the outlet a "tabloid without the slightest standards," and responded "why don't you also ask how many girlfriends I had in college [...] and when I lost my virginity?" Han used a cross-examination segment to ask the other candidates whether they believed in God, asserted his own Buddhist faith, and said "we will all face judgment one day", without meaningful follow-up. Notably, Han also criticized former KMT president Ma Ying-jeou, saying he was "too soft".

== Opinion polls ==
Local regression of polls conducted since 2019

== Results ==
Results of the 2020 Taiwanese presidential election
Candidate	Running mate	Party	Votes	%
Tsai Ing-wen	Lai Ching-te	Democratic Progressive Party	8,170,231	57.13
Han Kuo-yu	Chang San-cheng	Kuomintang	5,522,119	38.61
James Soong	Sandra Yu	People First Party	608,590	4.26
Total			14,300,940	100.00
Valid votes			14,300,940	98.87
Invalid/blank votes			163,631	1.13
Total votes			14,464,571	100.00
Registered voters/turnout			19,311,105	74.90
Source: CEC

Incumbent President Tsai Ing-wen won the 2020 Taiwanese presidential election with her Democratic Progressive Party and was re-elected to a second term with a historic record of 8.17 million votes (57.1 per cent), the highest vote share won by a DPP candidate. Rival candidate Han Kuo-yu of the Kuomintang (KMT) was the runner up with 5.52 million votes (38.6 per cent). Despite defeat, the KMT saw a recovery in vote share from 2016, noticeably in traditionally KMT-leaning areas including Hsinchu County, Miaoli, Nantou, Hualien, and Taitung. People First Party's candidate James Soong came third and received 600,000 votes (4.26 per cent). Turnout for the election was 74.9%, the highest among nationwide elections since 2008.

At an election rally after the results were announced, Tsai stated, "Democratic Taiwan and our democratically elected government will not concede to threats and intimidation. The results of this election have made that answer crystal clear."

=== By administrative division ===
Subdivision	Electorate	1		2		3		Invalid	Turnout	Margin
Subdivision	Electorate	James Soong		Han Kuo-yu		Tsai Ing-wen		Invalid	Turnout	Margin
Subdivision	Electorate	Sandra Yu		Chang San-cheng		Lai Ching-te		Invalid	Turnout	Margin
Subdivision	Electorate	Votes	%	Votes	%	Votes	%	Invalid	Turnout	Margin
Taipei City	2,167,264	70,769	4.34%	685,830	42.01%	875,854	53.65%	21,381	76.31%	190,024
New Taipei City	3,321,459	112,620	4.57%	959,631	38.91%	1,393,936	56.52%	28,041	75.09%	434,305
Keelung City	311,801	11,878	5.25%	99,360	43.92%	114,966	50.82%	2,458	73.34%	15,606
Yilan County	375,608	10,739	3.91%	90,010	32.80%	173,657	63.28%	3,029	73.86%	83,647
Taoyuan City	1,780,755	63,132	4.82%	529,749	40.40%	718,260	54.78%	14,066	74.42%	188,511
Hsinchu County	438,049	18,435	5.67%	154,224	47.45%	152,380	46.88%	3,970	75.11%	-1,844
Hsinchu City	345,345	14,103	5.40%	102,725	39.34%	144,274	55.26%	3,423	76.60%	41,549
Miaoli County	447,422	15,222	4.66%	164,345	50.32%	147,034	45.02%	3,578	73.80%	-17,311
Taichung City	2,251,064	84,800	4.99%	646,366	38.06%	967,304	56.95%	20,550	76.36%	320,938
Changhua County	1,035,507	35,060	4.59%	291,835	38.24%	436,336	57.17%	10,277	74.70%	144,501
Nantou County	413,485	13,315	4.45%	133,791	44.72%	152,046	50.83%	3,555	73.21%	18,255
Yunlin County	565,269	15,331	3.83%	138,341	34.60%	246,116	61.56%	5,203	71.65%	107,775
Chiayi County	428,640	11,138	3.62%	98,810	32.16%	197,342	64.22%	3,748	72.56%	98,532
Chiayi City	215,055	6,204	3.84%	56,269	34.79%	99,265	61.37%	1,664	75.98%	42,996
Tainan City	1,556,845	41,075	3.52%	339,702	29.10%	786,471	67.38%	12,341	75.77%	446,769
Kaohsiung City	2,299,558	55,309	3.14%	610,896	34.63%	1,097,621	62.23%	17,006	77.44%	486,725
Pingtung County	688,793	14,021	2.74%	179,353	35.10%	317,676	62.16%	4,992	74.92%	138,323
Taitung County	179,536	4,163	3.60%	67,413	58.28%	44,092	38.12%	1,119	65.05%	-23,321
Hualien County	269,558	6,869	3.71%	111,834	60.38%	66,509	35.91%	2,081	69.48%	-45,325
Penghu County	88,432	2,583	5.07%	20,911	41.08%	27,410	53.85%	644	58.29%	6,499
Kinmen County	120,721	1,636	3.41%	35,948	74.83%	10,456	21.77%	423	40.14%	-25,492
Lienchiang County	10,939	188	3.04%	4,776	77.16%	1,226	19.81%	82	57.34%	-3,550
Source: CEC Overview Table CEC Visual Query

=== Maps ===

Result by County level

Result by Township level

Vote leader and vote share in township-level districts.

Vote leader in county-level districts.

Swing between the two major parties from the previous presidential election.

Winner vote lead over runner-up by township/city or district.

Size of lead between the two tickets.

== Reactions ==
=== International reactions ===
- Australia: The Australian Department of Foreign Affairs and Trade released a media statement congratulating Tsai Ing-wen's re-election on 12 January. Similarly, Shadow Foreign Minister Penny Wong congratulated her victory on Twitter the next day.
- European Union: The EU acknowledged the high voter turnout and the democratic nature of the elections and emphasized the shared commitment to democracy, the rule of law, and human rights between the two nations.
- Japan: Japanese Foreign Minister Toshimitsu Motegi congratulated President Tsai on her victory, emphasising Taiwan as an important partner and friend sharing basic values. He expressed hope for deeper cooperation.
- Paraguay: President Mario Abdo Benítez, representing one of Taiwan's diplomatic allies, congratulated President Tsai on her re-election.
- United States: Secretary of State Mike Pompeo congratulated President Tsai Ing-wen on her re-election, stating that Taiwan's democratic system is a model for the Indo-Pacific region.

== See also ==
- 2020 Taiwanese general election
