= Presidential elections in Taiwan =

Election of President of Republic of China

The election of the president and vice president of Taiwan (Chinese: 中華民國總統、副總統選舉) is a universal direct election through secret vote by the citizens of Taiwan (ROC) in the Free Area. ROC presidents are elected by relative majority (plurality), meaning the candidate with the most votes wins without a runoff requirement. The most recent election took place on January 13, 2024.

- The Presidential and Vice Presidential Election and Recall Act states that a candidate for president or vice president must be a citizen of the Republic of China, at least 40 years old, and a resident of Taiwan for a period of no less than 15 years with a physical presence of no less than 6 consecutive months.
- The following persons shall not be registered as candidates for the president:
  - Military personnel
  - Election officials
  - People who hold foreign nationality or who hold residency of the People's Republic of China
  - People who have restored their nationality or acquired their nationality by naturalization
- The president and vice president are nominated on a joint ticket. Political parties which have gained at least 5% of the votes in the last presidential or legislative election may nominate a set of candidates directly. For example, during the 2012 elections, only the Kuomintang and Democratic Progressive Party were qualified to nominate candidates through this rule. Alternatively, candidates may be nominated by a petition signed by eligible voters numbering no less than 1.5% of the electors in the last legislative election. (This equaled 252,848 signatures for the 2012 election.)

== List of presidential elections in Taiwan ==
Order	Year	Party	Presidential candidate	Vice presidential candidate	Popular vote	%
9	1996	Kuomintang	Lee Teng-hui	Lien Chan	5,813,699	54.00%
9	1996	Democratic Progressive	Peng Ming-min	Frank Hsieh	2,274,586	21.13%
9	1996	Independent	Lin Yang-kang	Hau Pei-tsun	1,603,790	14.90%
9	1996	Independent	Chen Li-an	Wang Ching-feng	1,074,044	9.98%
10	2000	Democratic Progressive	Chen Shui-bian	Annette Lu	4,977,697	39.30%
10	2000	Independent	James Soong	Chang Chau-hsiung	4,664,972	36.84%
10	2000	Kuomintang	Lien Chan	Vincent Siew	2,925,513	23.10%
10	2000	Independent	Hsu Hsin-liang	Josephine Chu	79,429	0.63%
10	2000	New	Li Ao	Elmer Fung	16,782	0.13%
11	2004	Democratic Progressive	Chen Shui-bian	Annette Lu	6,471,970	50.11%
11	2004	Kuomintang	Lien Chan	James Soong	6,442,452	49.89%
12	2008	Kuomintang	Ma Ying-jeou	Vincent Siew	7,659,014	58.45%
12	2008	Democratic Progressive	Frank Hsieh	Su Tseng-chang	5,444,949	41.55%
13	2012	Kuomintang	Ma Ying-jeou	Wu Den-yih	6,891,139	51.60%
13	2012	Democratic Progressive	Tsai Ing-wen	Su Jia-chyuan	6,093,578	45.63%
13	2012	Independent	James Soong	Lin Ruey-shiung	369,588	2.77%
14	2016	Democratic Progressive	Tsai Ing-wen	Chen Chien-jen	6,894,744	56.12%
14	2016	Kuomintang	Eric Chu	Wang Ju-hsuan	3,813,365	31.04%
14	2016	People First	James Soong	Hsu Hsin-ying	1,576,861	12.84%
15	2020	Democratic Progressive	Tsai Ing-wen	Lai Ching-te	8,170,231	57.13%
15	2020	Kuomintang	Han Kuo-yu	Chang San-cheng	5,522,119	38.61%
15	2020	People First	James Soong	Sandra Yu	608,590	4.26%
16	2024	Democratic Progressive	Lai Ching-te	Hsiao Bi-khim	5,586,019	40.05%
16	2024	Kuomintang	Hou Yu-ih	Jaw Shaw-kong	4,671,021	33.49%
16	2024	Taiwan People's	Ko Wen-je	Cynthia Wu	3,690,466	26.46%

Electoral maps of Taiwanese presidential elections

2024 Election

2020 Election

2016 Election

2012 Election

2008 Election

2004 Election

2000 Election

1996 Election

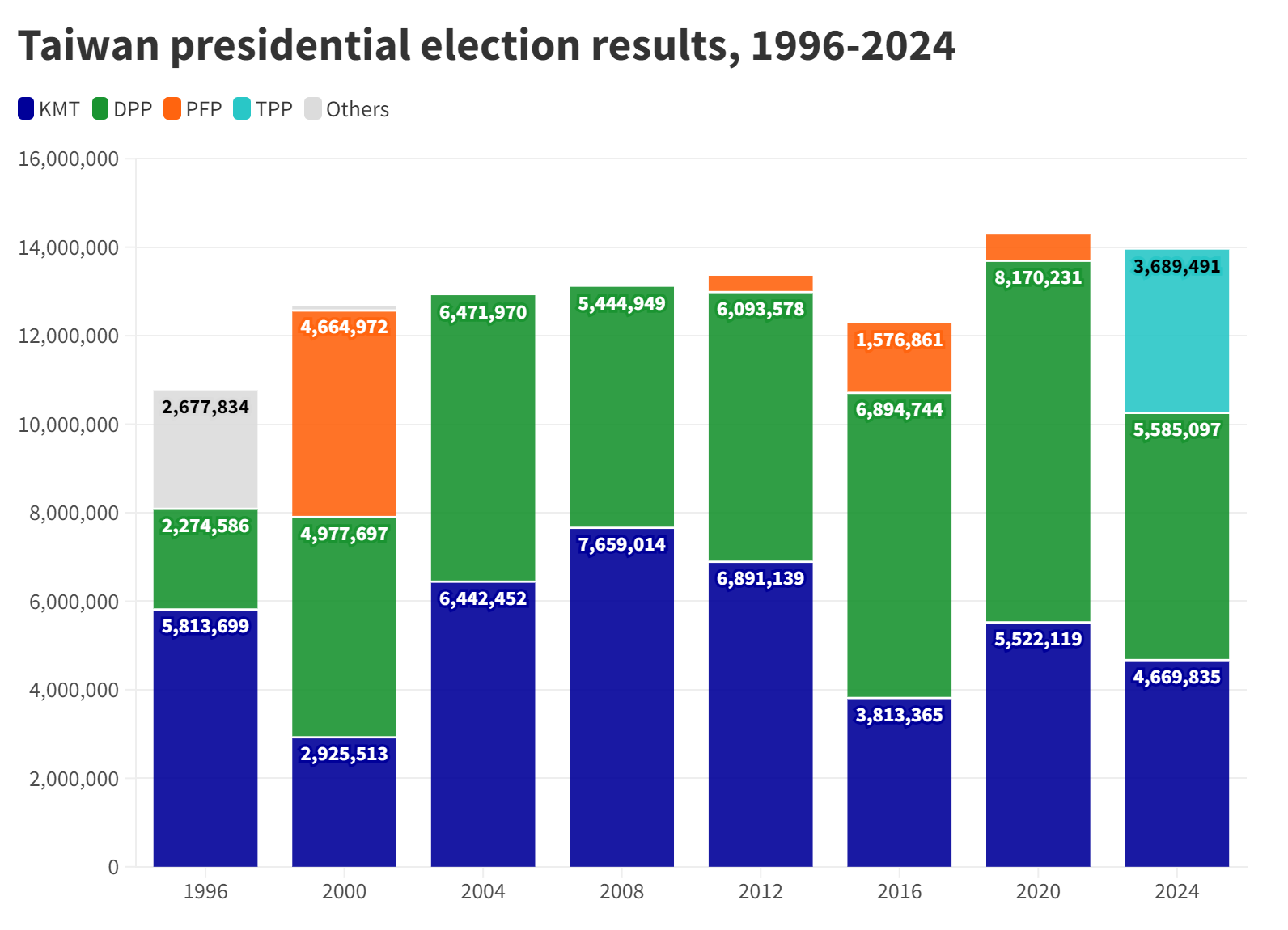
Votes received by political parties in the direct presidential elections. Democratic Progressive Party candidates Kuomintang candidates People First Party candidates or James Soong Taiwan People's Party candidates Others

== See also ==
- Elections in Taiwan
- President of the Republic of China
- List of presidents of the Republic of China
- Vice President of the Republic of China
- List of vice presidents of the Republic of China
- Right of expatriates to vote in their country of origin#Taiwan
