= List of unsuccessful candidates for President of the Republic of China =

Since the amendment of the Constitution of the Republic of China in 1994 that introduced direct elections, there have been 13 unsuccessful candidates for President of the Republic of China. (Note: There have been 17 unsuccessful major party candidacies by 13 individuals in 8 presidential elections.) Since 1996, four third party or independent candidacies have won at least ten percent of the popular vote, but all failed to win the presidency.

== List of unsuccessful candidates ==
| Term (Election) | Candidate | | | | Vote | | Running mate | | |
| Term (Election) | Candidate (Birth–death) | | Party | Office at time of election (Note: The most recent elective office, or senior appointive position, held by the candidate when the presidential election was held.) | PV | % | Candidate (Birth–death) | Party | Office at time of election |
|---|---|---|---|---|---|---|---|---|---|
| 9 (1996) | Peng Ming-min 彭明敏 (1923–2022) | Peng Ming-min | Democratic Progressive | Professor | 2,274,586 | 21.13% | Frank Hsieh 謝長廷 (1946– ) | Democratic Progressive | fmr. Member of the Legislative Yuan |
| 9 (1996) | Lin Yang-kang (Note: Candidacy obtained through citizen petitions.) 林洋港 (1927–2013) | Lin Yang-kang | Independent | fmr. President of the Judicial Yuan | 1,603,790 | 14.90% | Hau Pei-tsun 郝柏村 (1919–2020) | Independent | fmr. Premier |
| 9 (1996) | Chen Li-an 陳履安 (1937– ) | Chen Li-an | Independent | fmr. President of the Control Yuan | 1,074,044 | 9.98% | Wang Ching-feng 王清峰 (1952– ) | Independent | fmr. Member of the Control Yuan |
| 10 (2000) | James Soong 宋楚瑜 (1942– ) | James Soong | Independent | fmr. Governor of Taiwan | 4,664,972 | 36.84% | Chang Chau-hsiung 張昭雄 (1942– ) | Independent | Surgeon |
| 10 (2000) | Lien Chan 連戰 (1936– ) | Lien Chan | Kuomintang | Vice President | 2,925,513 | 23.10% | Vincent Siew 蕭萬長 (1939– ) | Kuomintang | Premier |
| 10 (2000) | Hsu Hsin-liang 許信良 (1941– ) | Hsu Hsin-liang | Independent | fmr. Taoyuan County Magistrate | 79,429 | 0.63% | Josephine Chu 朱惠良 (1950– ) | Independent | Member of the Legislative Yuan |
| 10 (2000) | Li Ao 李敖 (1935–2018) | Li Ao | New | Writer | 16,782 | 0.13% | Elmer Fung 馮滬祥 (1948–2021) | New | Member of the Legislative Yuan |
| 11 (2004) | Lien Chan 連戰 (1936– ) | Lien Chan | Kuomintang | fmr. Vice President | 6,442,452 | 49.89% | James Soong 宋楚瑜 (1942– ) | People First | fmr. Governor of Taiwan |
| 12 (2008) | Frank Hsieh 謝長廷 (1946– ) | Frank Hsieh | Democratic Progressive | fmr. Premier | 5,444,949 | 41.55% | Su Tseng-chang 蘇貞昌 (1947– ) | Democratic Progressive | fmr. Premier |
| 13 (2012) | Tsai Ing-wen 蔡英文 (1956– ) | Tsai Ing-wen | Democratic Progressive | fmr. Vice Premier | 6,093,578 | 45.63% | Su Jia-chyuan 蘇嘉全 (1956– ) | Democratic Progressive | fmr. Minister of the Interior |
| 13 (2012) | James Soong 宋楚瑜 (1942– ) | James Soong | People First | fmr. Governor of Taiwan | 369,588 | 2.77% | Lin Ruey-shiung 林瑞雄 (1938– ) | Independent | Epidemiologist |
| 14 (2016) | Eric Chu 朱立倫 (1961– ) | Eric Chu | Kuomintang | Mayor of New Taipei City | 3,813,365 | 31.04% | Wang Ju-hsuan 王如玄 (1961– ) | Independent | fmr. Minister of the Council of Labor Affairs |
| 14 (2016) | James Soong 宋楚瑜 (1942– ) | James Soong | People First | fmr. Governor of Taiwan | 1,576,861 | 12.83% | Hsu Hsin-ying 徐欣瑩 (1972– ) | Minkuotang | Member of the Legislative Yuan |
| 15 (2020) | Han Kuo-yu 韓國瑜 (1957– ) | Han Kuo-yu | Kuomintang | Mayor of Kaohsiung | 5,522,119 | 38.61% | Chang San-cheng 張善政 (1954– ) | Independent | fmr. Premier |
| 15 (2020) | James Soong 宋楚瑜 (1942– ) | James Soong | People First | fmr. Governor of Taiwan | 608,590 | 4.26% | Sandra Yu 余湘 (1959– ) | Independent | Businesswoman |
| 16 (2024) | Hou Yu-ih 侯友宜 (1957– ) | Hou Yu-ih | Kuomintang | Mayor of New Taipei City | 4,671,021 | 33.49% | Jaw Shaw-kong 趙少康 (1950– ) | Kuomintang | fmr. Member of the Legislative Yuan |
| 16 (2024) | Ko Wen-je 柯文哲 (1959– ) | Ko Wen-je | Taiwan People's | fmr. Mayor of Taipei | 3,690,466 | 26.46% | Cynthia Wu 吳欣盈 (1978– ) | Taiwan People's | Member of the Legislative Yuan |
