= Clara Chou =

Taiwanese journalist, radio personality

- 周玉蔻
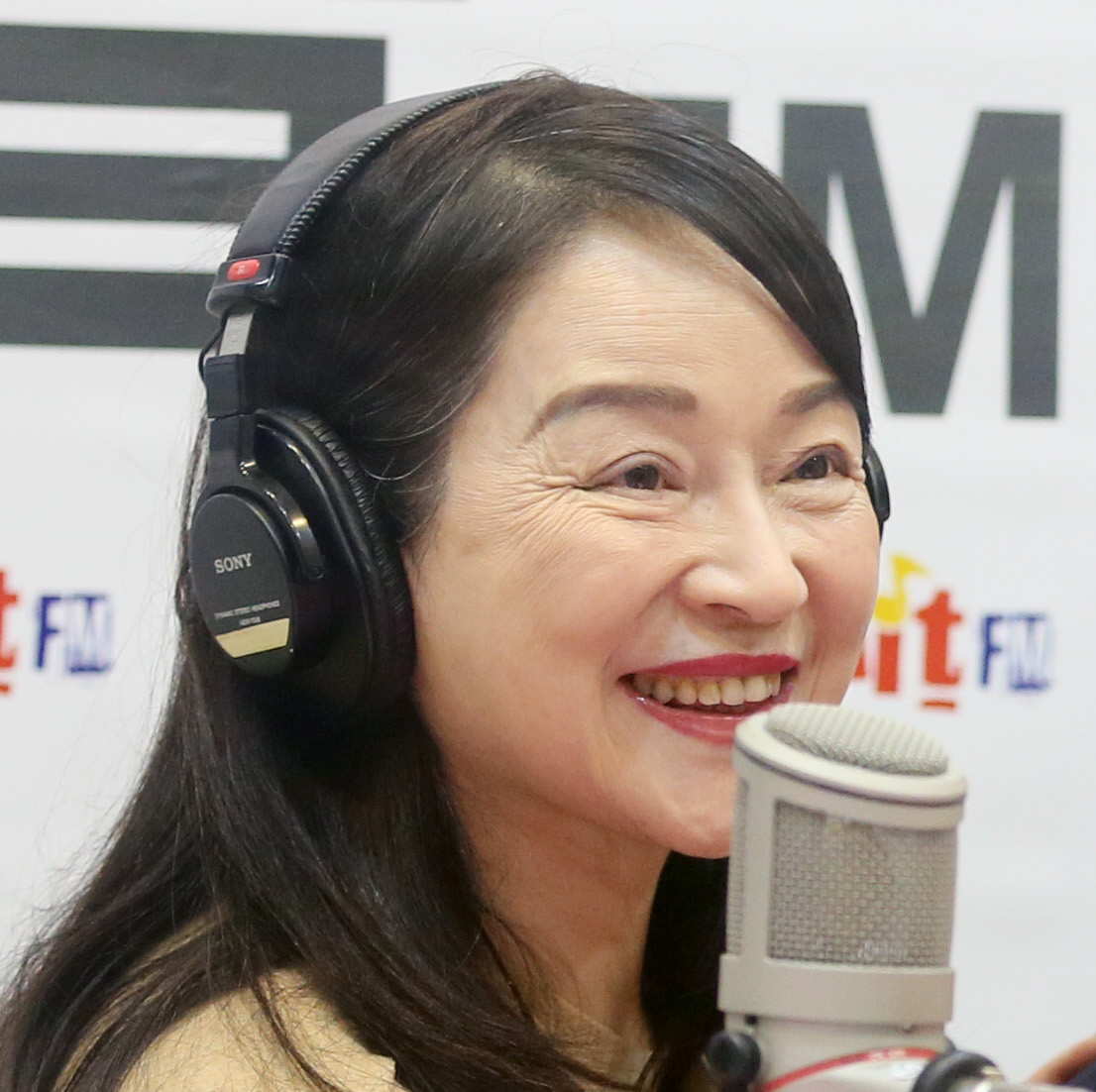
- Chou in 2017
- Born: 9 September 1953 (age 73); Keelung, Taiwan
- Education: National Chengchi University (BA); Harvard University (MPA); Peking University (MBA)
- Occupations: Journalist; television personality; radio personality
- Political party: Kuomintang (before 2000; 2008–2014); Taiwan Solidarity Union (2006)
- Spouse: Lee Hyun-Reng (m. 2001; div. 2017)

Chinese name
- Chinese: 周玉蔻
Transcriptions
Standard Mandarin
- Hanyu Pinyin: Zhōu Yùkòu
- Wade–Giles: Chou Yu-kou
Southern Min
- Hokkien POJ: Chiu Gio̍k-khò͘

Chou Yuh-kow (Chinese: 周玉蔻; pinyin: Zhōu Yùkòu; born 9 September 1953), also known by her English name Clara Chou, is a Taiwanese journalist and media personality.

== Early life and education ==
Chou was born in 1953 in Keelung, Taiwan. Her parents were from Laiyang, Shandong. Her father was a schoolteacher. She was raised in Keelung in a military dependents' village. She has two brothers, one of whom graduated from Central Police University.

Chou completed both junior high and senior high at National Keelung Girls' Senior High School. After high school, she graduated from National Chengchi University with a bachelor's degree in journalism in 1975. As an undergraduate, she was classmates with journalist Kelu Chao and film producer Peggy Chiao. Her undergraduate professors included writer Lin Hwai-min.

Chou later pursued graduate studies in the United States, earning a Master of Public Administration (MPA) degree from Harvard University in 1987. In 2012, she earned a Master of Business Administration (MBA) degree from Peking University.

== Journalism and broadcasting (1975–2012) ==
After college, Chou worked as a reporter and translator for the Broadcasting Corporation of China and as a reporter for the English-language newspaper China News (英文中國日報). By 1981, she was a senior editor at the newly-established CommonWealth Magazine. She then worked as a reporter for United Daily News. In 1986, she obtained an interview with Philippine president Corazon Aquino after arriving before dawn without a scheduled appointment and remaining outside Aquino's office while other international news organizations conducted their interviews.

In 1988, Chou began a six-month reporting project on Chang Ya-juo, a mistress of Chiang Ching-kuo, for which United Daily News provided travel expenses and other resources for her to interview members of Chang's family and cultural-preservation workers in China. United Daily News began serializing her resulting account in the autumn of 1989. Linking Publishing published the work as a 261-page book, Chiang Ching-kuo and Chang Ya-juo (蔣經國與章亞若), on January 18, 1990.

In April 1990, Chou became a news director (採訪主任) of the United Evening News. Alongside her newspaper work, she continued writing book-length accounts of contemporary Taiwanese political figures. In December 1992, CommonWealth published her book Lee Teng-hui's Thousand Days (李登輝的一千天) detailing the early years of Lee Teng-hui's presidency.

After leaving newspaper journalism, Chou expanded into television and broadcasting in 1994, establishing the 2000 Studio (2000年工作室) and her own television programs. In March 1998, she was hosting the morning program UFO Breakfast (飛碟早餐) on UFO Radio. She was also editor-in-chief of TVBS Weekly and editor-in-chief of the news department at Era News.

In November 2000, Chou returned to the Era media group to serve as director of Era News while writing a book about then-former premier Tang Fei. On February 26, 2004, Chou announced that she was ending her work at UFO Radio and News98, citing differences with the management of UFO Radio.

== Later career ==
From 2012 until 2021, she anchored Chou Chou Breakfast (蔻蔻早餐) from 7:00 to 9:00 every weekday on Hit FM.

In 2014, Chou accused President Ma Ying-jeou of accepting donations from the Ting Hsin International Group. At the time, the company was investigated as part of the 2014 Taiwan food scandal. Chou believed Ma had a hand in covering up Ting Hsin's role in the incident. In December, Ma filed two lawsuits against Chou for the comments she made. She countered with a lawsuit against the Kuomintang, targeting acting party chairperson Wu Den-yih. Chou was stripped of her KMT membership later that month, days after she had presented evidence of the party's alleged misdeeds. In December 2015, the Taipei District Prosecutors’ Office indicted Chou on charges of defamation in connection to her comments about Ting Hsin. The first ruling in Ma's court case against Chou was handed down later that month. The Taipei District Court found her not guilty of defamation. Ma appealed the verdict to the Taiwan High Court.

Chou made further accusations of the KMT in June 2015, this time against then-unconfirmed presidential candidate Hung Hsiu-chu, claiming that Hung's master's degree from Northeast Missouri State University was falsified. Hung sued Chou and the Next Magazine employees who first published the accusations. Chou further stated in August that Hung was thinking of ending her presidential run early in return for a legislative position or money. In response, Hung charged Chou with defamation again. That same month, Terry Gou was awarded NT$2 million in his defamation suit against Chou, who had accused Gou of violating the Political Donations Act in January.

== Political career ==
Chou supported the Kuomintang, before the party lost power in the 2000 election. After the loss, she publicly supported the Democratic Progressive Party's policies, and ran as a candidate for the Pan-Green Taiwan Solidarity Union in the 2006 Taipei City municipal election. She was expelled from the TSU during her mayoral campaign for suggesting that President Chen Shui-bian resign in the wake of First Lady Wu Shu-chen's indictment for graft, though her name still appeared on the ballot as the TSU candidate. The expulsion was later reduced to a suspension. By 2008, Chou had rejoined the KMT. After Ma Ying-jeou resigned as KMT chair in December 2014, Chou tried to run for the position, but was rejected.

2006 Taipei City Mayoral Election Result
No	Candidate	Party	Votes	%
1	Li Ao	Independent	7,795	0.61%
2	Clara Chou (Note: Despite Chou's expulsion from the Taiwan Solidarity Union on 9 November 2006, the party could not withdraw their recommendation for Chou under Republic of China's Public Officials Election and Recall Law. She would still contest the elections as a TSU candidate.)	Taiwan Solidarity Union	3,372	0.26%
3	Frank Hsieh	Democratic Progressive Party	525,869	40.89%
4	James Soong (Note: James Soong was Chairman of the People's First Party at the time of the elections, but entered the elections as an independent.)	Independent	53,281	4.14%
5	Hau Lung-pin	Kuomintang	692,085	53.81%
6	Ke Tsi-hai (柯賜海)	Independent	3,687	0.29%

== Personal life ==
In 1998, Chou claimed that she and Daniel Huang had an affair. She married Lee Hyun-Reng in 2001.
