= Yang Fu-mei =

Taiwanese politician

Yang Fu-mei (Chinese: 楊富美; born 1942) is a Taiwanese politician.

== Education ==
Yang, a Kaohsiung native, studied pharmacology at Kaohsiung Medical University before earning a master's degree in nutrition at Columbia University in the United States.

== Political career ==
She was a member of the Overseas Chinese Affairs Commission, before serving as a member of the Legislative Yuan, representing overseas Chinese on behalf of the People First Party. During her tenure on the Fifth Legislative Yuan, Yang was critical of Twu Shiing-jer, and underwent a disciplinary review in 2003 because she was absent for a vote to consider postponement of confirmation for new Justices of the Constitutional Court. Though Yang originally planned to go on a 2004 European junket led by Democratic Progressive Party colleagues, to advocate for Taiwan's participation in the World Health Organization, she later chose not make the trip.

In 2011, Yang and her husband Kao Tsu-min led a petition to convince People First Party chairman James Soong to run in the 2012 Taiwanese presidential election.

== Controversy ==
After Twu Shiing-jer was accused of sexual harassment in 2002, he filed a lawsuit against several of the accusers for libel, and attempted to have Yang listed as a defendant.

Yang was one of eight incumbent and former legislators indicted on charges of corruption in 2008, for allegedly accepting bribes from the Taiwan Dental Association in her endorsement of the 2003 Oral Healthcare Act. The Taipei District Court ruled in October 2010, that none of the accused were guilty. The decision was reversed by the Taiwan High Court in September 2011, which sentenced Yang to seven years and two months imprisonment, and additionally suspended her civil rights for three years. Upon appeal, the Supreme Court ordered a retrial of the case, which occurred in March 2015. The retrial found six of the eight defendants, including Yang, not guilty, and a further appeal to the Supreme Court was dismissed in March 2016.

During the 2014 Taipei mayoral election, television host Tsai Yu-chen commented on allegations of forced organ harvesting against physician and independent candidate Ko Wen-je, additionally making statements about Yang and Kao. The former legislators filed a lawsuit against Tsai and network executives in 2015. The first ruling held that there was insufficient evidence for Tsai's comments harming the reputations of Yang or Kao. The Taiwan High Court ordered Tsai to pay compensation to Yang and Kao in 2017, after considering other comments that Tsai had made about them.
