= Ticket (election) =

Single election choice which fills more than one political office or seat

The term ticket can mean different things in relation to elections of councils or legislative bodies. First, it may refer to a single election choice which fills more than one political office or seat. For example, in Guyana, the candidates for President and Parliament run on the same "ticket", because they are elected together on a single ballot question — as a vote for a given party-list in the Parliamentary election counts as a vote for the party's corresponding presidential candidate — rather than separately.

A ticket can also refer to a political group or political party. In this case, the candidates for a given party are said to be running on the party's ticket. "Straight party voting" (most common in some U.S. states) is voting for the entire party ticket, including every office for which the party has a candidate running. Particularly in the era of mechanical voting machines, it was possible to accomplish this in many jurisdictions by the use of a "party lever" which automatically cast a vote for each member of the party by the activation of a single lever. "Ticket splitters" are people who vote for candidates from more than one political party when they vote for public offices, voting on the basis of individual personalities and records instead of on the basis of party loyalties.

While a ticket usually does refer to a political party, they are not necessarily the same. In rare cases, members of a political party can run against their party's official candidate by running with a rival party's ticket label or creating a new ticket under an independent or ad hoc party label depending on the jurisdiction's election laws. Depending on the party's rules, these rogue members may retain the membership of their original party. Thus two individuals from one political party can oppose each other under different tickets. This was the case for Taiwanese politician James Soong, who withdrew from the Kuomintang and ran against its official candidate, Lien Chan, for election as President in the 2000 elections; in the subsequent election in 2004, Soong ran as Lien's running mate.

Political party factions may also sponsor tickets in primary elections. When that occurs, several candidates, usually one for each office for which the party's nomination is being contested in the primary, endorse one another and may make joint appearances and share advertising with the goal of securing the party's nomination for the office each is seeking for all ticket members. This system was frequently seen in the "Solid South" era in the Southern United States when there was no effective two party system and victory in the Democratic Party primary was considered to be "tantamount to election".

As well in Australia, the variant of STV used for the Commonwealth upper houses and state upper houses may allow voters to mark a preference for a "ticket" (party slate) and not have to mark preferences for individual candidates. A vote marked for a ticket is used to elect just one candidate for the party.

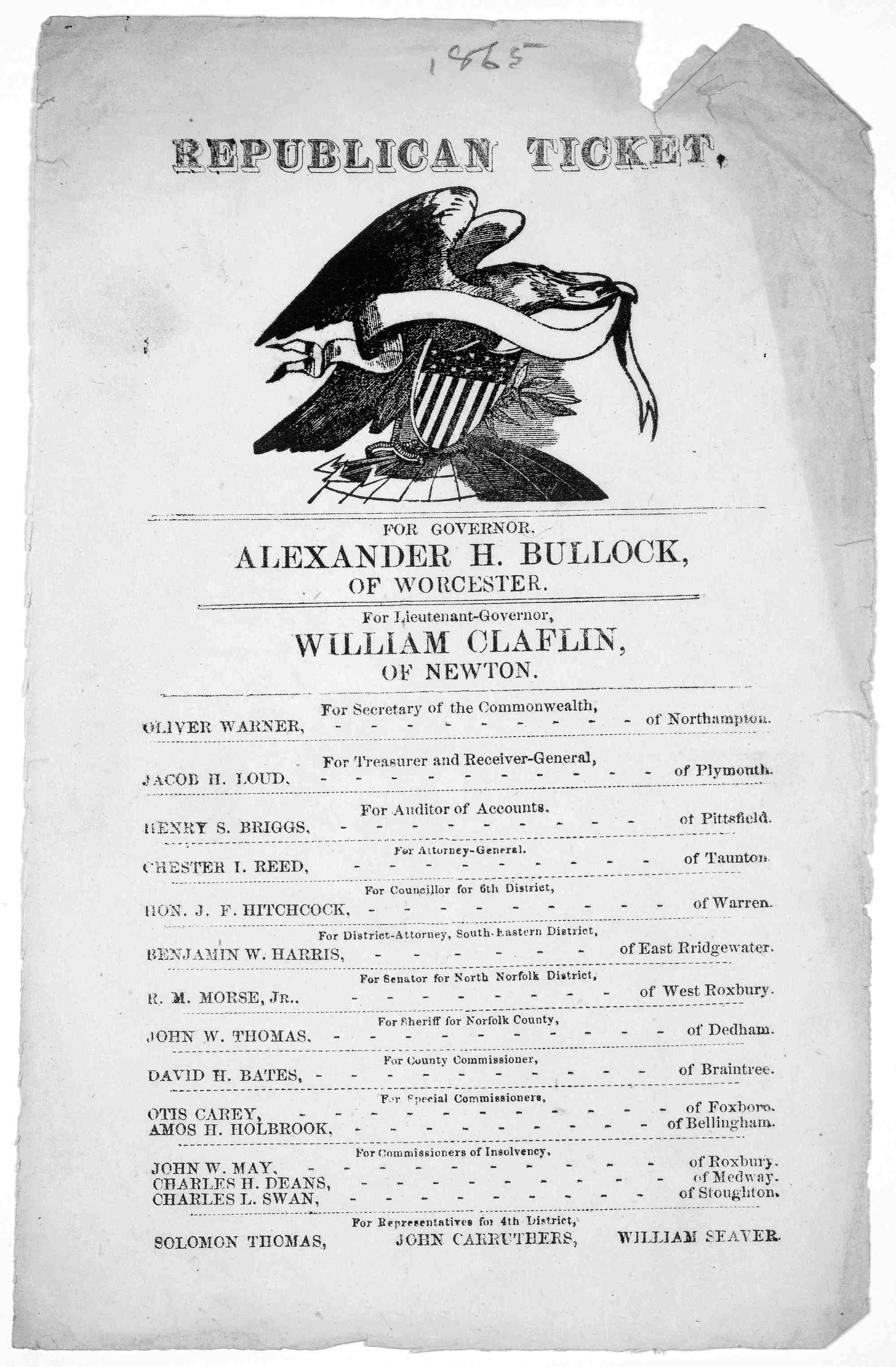
Republican Party ticket from 1865 gubernatorial election in Massachusetts. The Republican candidate, Alexander H. Bullock, defeated Democratic challenger Darius N. Couch.

Flyer for 2008 Democratic Party ticket in Monmouth County, New Jersey. Even though a "ticket" is no longer a physical reality in voting, parties still push the notion of voting for them in every race on the ballot.
