= 2012 Taiwanese general election =

Two elections were held in Taiwan on the same day 14 January 2012:

- 2012 Taiwanese presidential election
- 2012 Taiwanese legislative election
