= Li Ao =

Chinese-Taiwanese writer

- 李敖
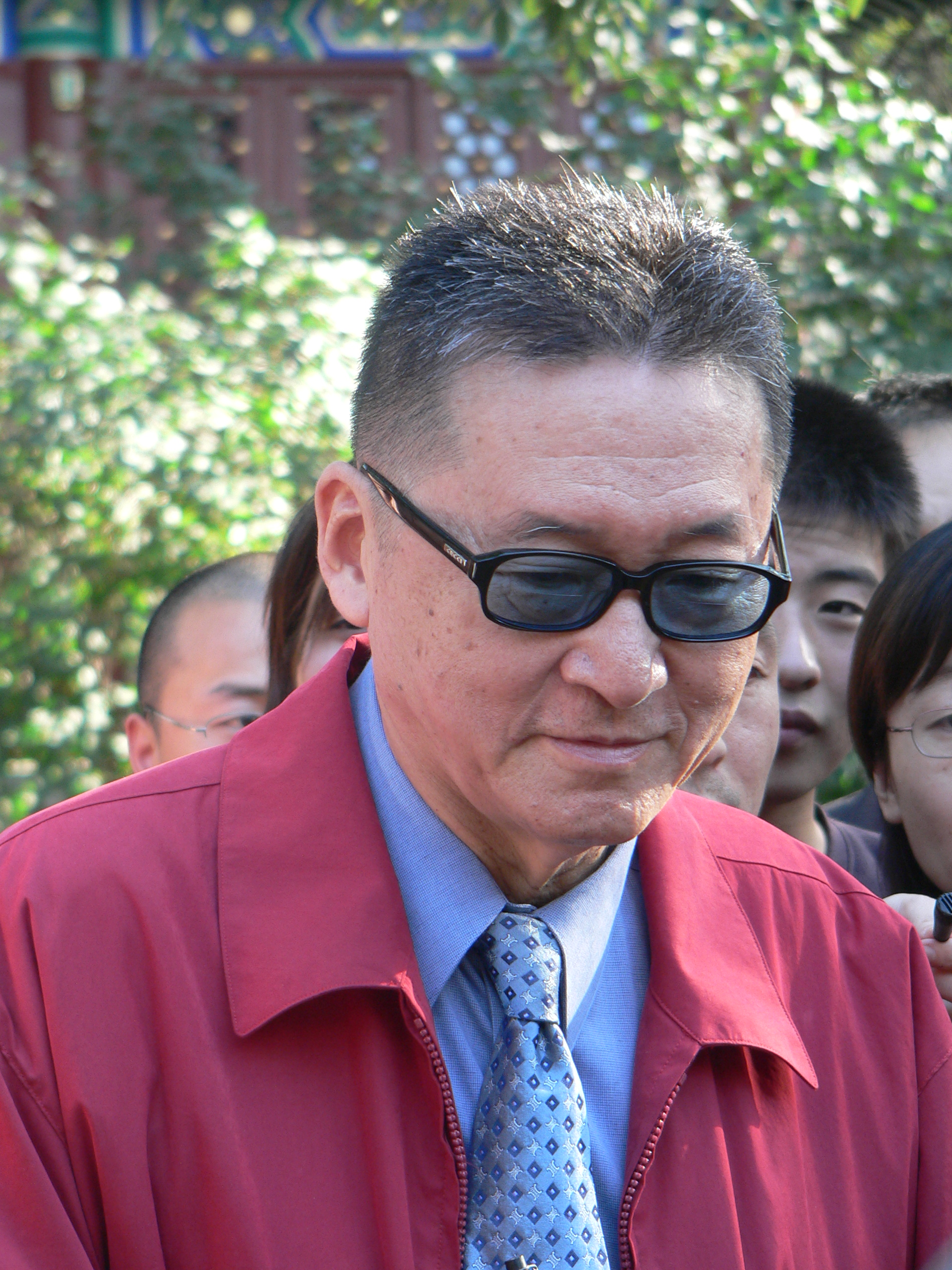
- Li Ao at Fayuan Temple in Beijing in 2005

Member of the Legislative Yuan
- In office 1 February 2005 – 31 January 2008
- Constituency: Taipei 2

Personal details
- Born: 25 April 1935 Harbin, Manchukuo
- Died: 18 March 2018 (aged 82) Taipei, Taiwan
- Spouses: Terry Hu (m. 1980; div. 1980) Wang Zhihui (m. 1992)
- Children: Hedy Lee (1964, daughter); Li Kan (1992, son); Li Chen (1994, daughter)
- Education: National Taiwan University (BA, MA)
- Occupation: Writer; social commentator; historian; independent politician
- Courtesy name: Aozhi (敖之) (Pe̍h-ōe-jī: Ngô͘ Chi)

Li Ao (Chinese: 李敖; pinyin: Lǐ Áo; Pe̍h-ōe-jī: Lí Ngô͘; 25 April 1935 – 18 March 2018), also spelled Lee Ao, was a Taiwanese writer, politician, and public intellectual. He wrote more than 100 books, primarily on historical and political topics, and developed a reputation as a confrontational political firebrand.

Li rose to prominence in the early 1960s through his articles in Wen Hsing (1957–1988), an intellectual Taiwanese magazine where he defended Hu Shih, criticized traditional Chinese culture, and advocated for complete Westernization, igniting a cultural debate over Chinese and Western ideologies. During the 1970s, he became active in the pro-democracy Tangwai movement, which resulted in two prison sentences as a political prisoner.

After martial law was lifted in Taiwan in 1987, Li frequently ran for public office. In 2000, he ran for the presidency of Taiwan as the New Party candidate. From 2004 to 2008, he served as an independent legislator in the Legislative Yuan. After leaving office, Li focused on writing and teaching, and became a media personality hosting shows such as Li Ao Speaks His Mind (李敖有话说) and Li Ao's Wit and Humor (李敖语妙天下).

Over his prolific career, Li espoused liberalism, Chinese nationalist ideals, anti-American and anti-Japanese sentiments. He was prominent critic of the Chiang family and of the Kuomintang's authoritarian rule in Taiwan. Following Taiwan's democratization in the late 1980s, he also criticized the Democratic Progressive Party and the Taiwanese independence movement. In his later years, Li acknowledged the Chinese Communist Party's role in revitalizing China while calling for greater freedom of speech.

== Early life and education ==
Li was born on April 25, 1935, in Harbin, Manchukuo, to Li Dingyi (李鼎彝), a prominent professor of Chinese, and his wife Zhang Kuichen (張桂貞). His family had ancestry in Wei County (modern-day Weifang), Shandong, and Fuyu, Jilin. When Li was two years old, the family moved to Beijing, where Li's father worked in the government's opium suppression bureau.

While the family lived in Beijing, Li's father was accused of being a traitor to the Kuomintang by his superiors. Li then began feeling enmity towards the party. The entire Li family, except for two children, moved to Taiwan at the end of the Chinese Civil War in 1949. Li earned his bachelor's degree in history from National Taiwan University (NTU) in 1959. In 1963, he earned a master's degree in history from NTU. As a graduate student, he was the executive editor of the magazine Wen Hsing, a liberal literary magazine.

== Writing career ==
Li participated in the democratic movement in Taiwan between the 1960s and 1980s. In the 1960s, he was the editor-in-chief of pro-democracy magazine Wen Hsing (文星). He was jailed by the Kuomintang government from 1971 to 1976, for helping a pro–Taiwan independence legal scholar, Peng Ming-min, escape to Japan in 1970; even though Li himself had a long history of being an advocate of reunification. Throughout the 1970s, Li received international attention for his imprisonment. He was highlighted by Amnesty International as one of the three most important political prisoners in Taiwan in 1974. From 1981 to 1982 Li was imprisoned over a dispute with a former employer.

Li's novel Mountaintop Love (上山．上山．愛), about a mother and a daughter who fall in love with the same man, though several years apart, established his status as a novelist, solidified by Martyrs' Shrine: The Story of the Reform Movement of 1898 in China (北京法源寺), a novel about the Hundred Days' Reform. Ninety-six of his books were banned in Taiwan until 1991. Popular in mainland China in the 1990s and 2000s, the majority of his books have been prohibited from republishing since 2012 amid China's tightened censorship under General Secretary of the Chinese Communist Party Xi Jinping, except his two memoirs and Martyrs' Shrine.

== Political career ==
Li participated in Taiwan's presidential election in 2000 as a candidate for the New Party. Li usually played the role of a political gadfly, and his campaign was largely symbolic. He took the election as an opportunity to "educate" the people of Taiwan. Both Li and his party publicly encouraged people to vote for James Soong. During the presidential debates, Li even stated that he was not planning to vote for himself and that people should vote for Soong.

2000 Republic of China Presidential Election Result
Political affiliation	Candidate		Votes
Political affiliation	President	Vice President	Total votes	Percentage
Democratic Progressive Party	Chen Shui-bian	Annette Lu	4,977,737	39.3%
Independent	James Soong	Chang Chau-hsiung	4,664,932	36.8%
Kuomintang	Lien Chan	Vincent Siew	2,925,513	23.1%
Independent	Hsu Hsin-liang	Josephine Chu	79,429	0.63%
New Party	Li Ao	Elmer Fung	16,782	0.13%
Total			12,786,671	82.69% voter turnout
Valid votes			12,664,393
Invalid votes			122,278

Since the 2000 Taiwanese presidential election, Li had bitterly spoken out against pro-independence Nobel laureate Yuan T. Lee, who publicly supported Chen Shui-bian. He also accused former President Lee Teng-hui of corruption. In October 2004, Li ran in the December 11 legislative election as a non-partisan candidate of the South Taipei constituency, and was subsequently elected to be the last winning place. He took office as an independent legislator on 1 February 2005.

In February 2005, Li held a press conference, accusing the PFP leader, James Soong of having changed his opposition towards military weapons purchase from the United States under the influence of people of pro-American inclination, people with CIA backgrounds and arms traders who would receive kick-backs. Li threatened Soong that he would reveal the names of the people with CIA backgrounds, who were influencing Soong, to the general public unless Soong reverted to his previous opposition position. PFP legislators dismissed the accusation and responded that Li Ao should reveal his evidence to support his story.

Later that year, in June, Li claimed to the Taiwanese press that he had exclusive information from the CIA concerning the 3-19 shooting incident. He alleged that the real motive of the killer was to assassinate the Vice-President Annette Lu in order to garner sympathy votes for Chen Shui-bian, and that the killer had been condoned by the governing party for ulterior political reasons. After flashing several allegedly CIA-endorsed documents to reporters, he mailed them to Annette Lu, claiming that she needed to know the truth about the assassination attempt to the full extent.

On 19 September 2005, Li returned to Mainland China for the first time in 56 years. He was invited to give speeches at Peking University, Tsinghua University and Fudan University where he was warmly received, and the trip was claimed to have had significant impact on observers of Cross-Strait relations.

Li was a candidate for the 2006 Taipei Mayoral election, and a candidate for the 2012 Legislative Yuan elections, campaigning in Taipei City District 8 under the People First Party (PFP) banner. Li also satirized Mao Zedong's Little Red Book in his article.

2006 Taipei City Mayoral Election Result
No	Candidate	Party	Votes	%
1	Li Ao	Independent	7,795	0.61%
2	Clara Chou (Note: Despite Chou's expulsion from the Taiwan Solidarity Union on November 9, 2006, the party could not withdraw their recommendation for Chou under Republic of China's Public Officials Election and Recall Law. She would still contest the elections as a TSU candidate.)	Taiwan Solidarity Union	3,372	0.26%
3	Frank Hsieh	Democratic Progressive Party	525,869	40.89%
4	James Soong (Note: James Soong was Chairman of the People's First Party at the time of the elections, but entered the elections as an independent.)	Independent	53,281	4.14%
5	Hau Lung-pin	Kuomintang	692,085	53.81%
6	Ke Tsi-hai	Independent	3,687	0.29%

On 24 October 2006, Li sprayed tear gas and wielded a stun gun during a Legislative Yuan National Defense Committee meeting, forcing several members of the parliament to flee. He was attempting to stop debate on purchasing attack submarines and Patriot anti-aircraft missiles for $16 billion from the U.S. He was also wearing the Guy Fawkes mask from V for Vendetta.

== Personal life ==
In the early 1960s, Li cohabited with Wang Shangqin, a National Taiwan University student and the younger sister of the writer Wang Shangyi. In 1964, Wang went to the United States for study, only to discover that she was pregnant with Li's child. She gave birth to their daughter, Hedy W. Lee, out of wedlock in Seattle. However, during Wang Shangqin's pregnancy, Li Ao became romantically involved with another woman, Wu Haidi. In 1966, Wang brought their daughter to Taiwan and briefly reconciled with Li, but their relationship ultimately ended due to his involvement with multiple other women. Wang has acrimonious relationships with both Li and their daughter Lee thereafter. After she returned to the US from Taiwan, she remarried Wen Naijian, an engineer. Lee, in a book published in 2004, accused Wen, her stepfather, of molesting her when she was 14, which Wang denied.

On 6 May 1980, Li married Taiwanese film star Terry Hu. The couple divorced on 28 August 1980.

On 8 March 1992, Li married his second wife, Wang Zhihui (王志慧). They had one son and one daughter. Their son, Li Kan (李戡), graduated with a BA degree in history from Peking University and with a PhD degree in Chinese Studies from the University of Cambridge.
