= 2001 Taiwanese legislative election =

- 1 December 2001

All 225 seats in the Legislative Yuan 113 seats needed for a majority
- Turnout: 66.16%
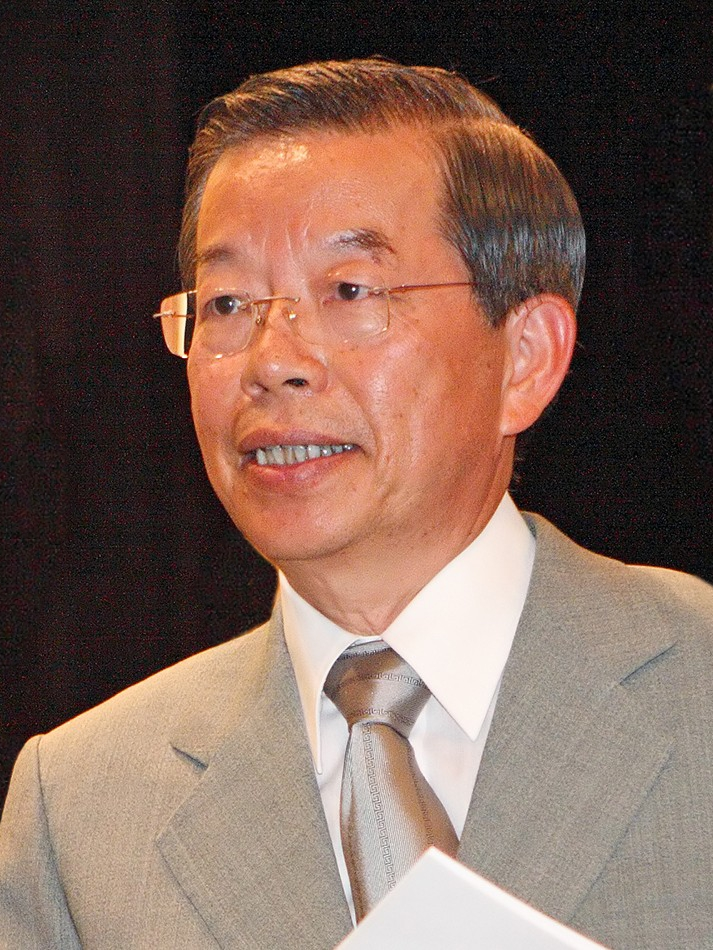

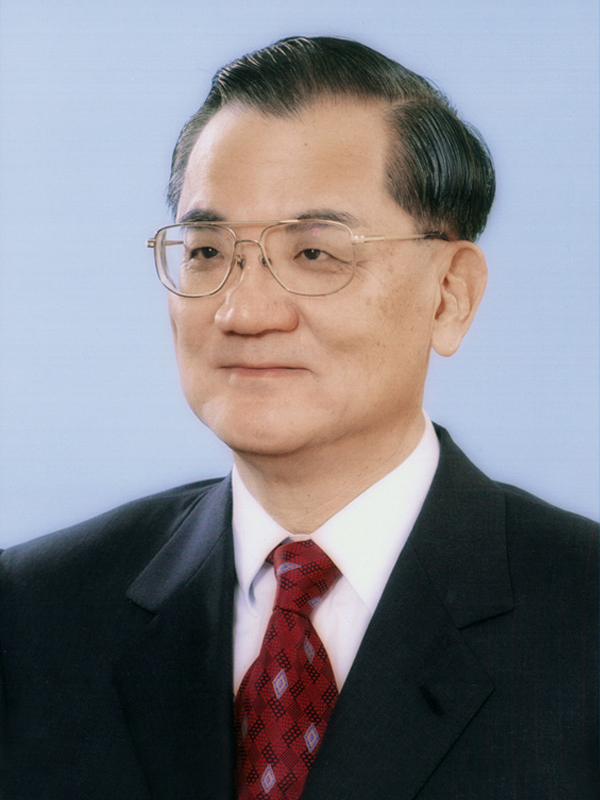

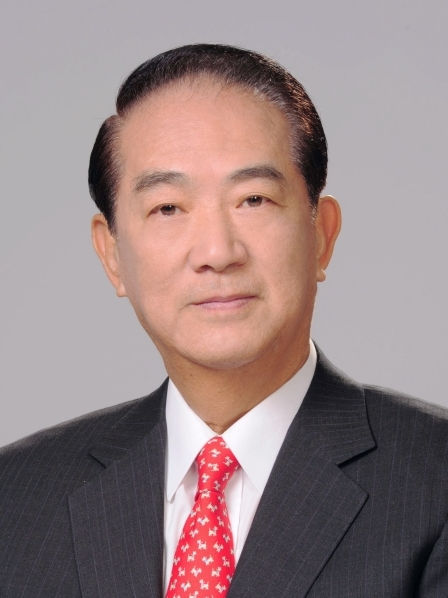

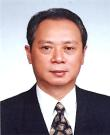
	Majority party	Minority party
Leader	Frank Hsieh	Lien Chan
Party	DPP	KMT
Alliance	Pan-Green	Pan-Blue
Leader since	20 April 2000	20 March 2000
Last election	29.56%, 70 seats	46.43%, 123 seats
Seats won	87	68
Seat change	▲17	▼55
Popular vote	3,447,740	2,949,371
Percentage	33.38%	28.56%
Swing	▲3.82pp	▼17.87pp
	Third party	Fourth party
Leader	James Soong	Huang Chu-wen
Party	People First	TSU
Alliance	Pan-Blue	Pan-Green
Leader since	31 March 2000	12 August 2001
Last election	–	–
Seats won	46	13
Seat change	New	New
Popular vote	1,917,836	801,560
Percentage	18.57%	7.76%
Swing	–	–

- Elected member party by seat: Democratic Progressive Party; Kuomintang; People First; Taiwan Solidarity Union; New Party; Taiwan Number One; Independent
President before election
Wang Jin-pyng
KMT
Elected President
Wang Jin-pyng
KMT

The 2001 Taiwanese legislative election was held on 1 December 2001. All 225 seats of the Legislative Yuan were up for election: 168 elected by popular vote, 41 elected on the basis of the proportional representation based on the nationwide votes received by participating political parties, eight elected from overseas Chinese constituencies on the basis of the proportion of nationwide votes received by participating political parties, eight elected by popular vote among the Taiwanese aboriginal populations. Members served three year terms from February 1, 2002, to February 1, 2005.

== Background ==
The first national election to be held after Chen Shui-bian's victory in the 2000 presidential election, the election resulted for the first time in the Kuomintang (KMT) losing its majority and President Chen's Democratic Progressive Party to emerging as the largest party in the legislature. However, the Pan-Blue Coalition developed between the Kuomintang, the People First Party and the New Party, enabled the Chinese reunificationist and conservative opposition to muster a slim majority over the pro-Taiwan independence Pan-Green Coalition formed between the Democratic Progressive Party and the Taiwan Solidarity Union. This resulted in much of President Chen's agenda being derailed or deadlocked for the following three years.

== Results ==
The KMT lost its majority for the first time, losing 46 seats and falling to 68 seats. The largest party had become the DPP with 87 seats, followed by the KMT, and the PFP with 46 seats. Various parties and independents held the remainder. The New Party which lost all of its seat except the one seat on Quemoy while the newly formed Taiwan Solidarity Union (TSU) captured 13 seats, with independents holding on to 10 seats. Overall the pan-blue opposition got 115 seats, while the government pan-green got 100 seats. The pan-blue remained majority.

Part of the KMT's loss could be attributed to defections to both the People First Party and Taiwan Solidarity Union. The People First Party formed by James Soong and his supporters after the 2000 presidential elections. Soong had been expelled from the KMT after launching an independent bid for the presidency and narrowly lost the race to Chen Shui-bian. The Taiwan Solidarity Union was formed by supporters of former President and KMT Chairman Lee Teng-hui, who took the title of "spiritual leader" in the party. For this, Lee was also expelled from the KMT. Though the both offshoots of the Kuomintang, the People First Party advocated a more conservative position than the KMT while the Taiwan Solidarity Union took on a radical pro-independence stance. After Lee's expulsion, the KMT and PFP had a warming of relations and cooperated in the election. The more moderate pro-independence Democratic Progressive Party cooperated with the Taiwan Solidarity Union likewise, leading to the formation of the pan-blue and pan-green coalitions.

The KMT's loss in the election could also be attributed partly to the single non-transferable vote scheme in place. Though the DPP won 40% of the seats they only polled 36% of the vote because of the inability of the KMT, PFP, and New Party to coordinate their electoral strategies. Despite winning a plurality of votes in Hualien, vote-splitting between KMT candidates led to the election of one DPP and one PFP candidate instead. This led to more stringent vote allocation strategies by pan-blue in 2004, which helped prevent pan-green from gaining a majority.

Party	Votes	%	Seats	+/–
Democratic Progressive Party	3,447,740	33.38	87	+17
Kuomintang	2,949,371	28.56	68	–55
People First Party	1,917,836	18.57	46	New
Taiwan Solidarity Union	801,560	7.76	13	New
New Party	269,620	2.61	1	–10
Democratic Non-Partisan Alliance	22,784	0.22	0	–3
Taiwan Number One Party	12,917	0.13	1	New
Wisdom Action Party	3,224	0.03	0	New
Taiwan Independence Party	1,382	0.01	0	–1
Green Party Taiwan	1,045	0.01	0	0
Chinese Taiwan Aborigine Democratic Party	790	0.01	0	New
Great Chinese Battle Line of Unification	332	0.00	0	New
Independents	899,254	8.71	9	–3
Total	10,327,855	100.00	225	0
Valid votes	10,327,855	98.65		
Invalid/blank votes	141,150	1.35		
Total votes	10,469,005	100.00		
Registered voters/turnout	15,822,583	66.16		
Source: Election Study Center, Psephos
