= Chang Chau-hsiung =

Taiwanese physician and politician

- 張昭雄

Vice Chairperson of People First Party
- In office 31 March 2000 – July 2016
- Chairperson: James Soong

Personal details
- Born: 3 February 1942 (age 84) Takao, Taiwan, Empire of Japan
- Party: People First Party (after 2000)
- Spouse: Lee Fang-hui
- Children: Howard Y. Chang (son)
- Education: National Taiwan University (MD)
- Profession: Surgeon

Chinese name
- Traditional Chinese: 張昭雄
- Simplified Chinese: 张昭雄
Transcriptions
Standard Mandarin
- Hanyu Pinyin: Zhāng Zhàoxióng
Southern Min
- Hokkien POJ: Tiuⁿ Chiau-hiông

Chang Chau-hsiung (Chinese: 張昭雄; pinyin: Zhāng Zhàoxióng; born 3 February 1942) is a Taiwanese physician and politician. He served as the vice-chairman of the People First Party from 2000 to 2016.

== Early life and education ==
Chang was born in Takao Prefecture, Taiwan, on February 3, 1942. After graduating from Kaohsiung Municipal Kaohsiung Senior High School, he attended medical school at National Taiwan University and earned his Doctor of Medicine (M.D.) in 1967.

== Early career ==
In 1967, Chang finished his surgical training in the university hospital. He then served as a resident doctor and chief resident doctor until 1972. He then went to the United States for further training. He worked in Michael Reese Hospital, Texas Heart Institute and Mokral Hospital for medical research and surgical practice. He returned to Taiwan in 1976.

Chang worked in the university hospital as a part-time attending physician from 1976 to 1977. He worked at Chang Gung Memorial Hospital from 1976 to 1999, and was the president of Chang Gung University from 1997 to 1999. He is the author of sixteen and coauthor of 167 scientific citation index papers.

== Political career ==
Chang, a former adviser to Chen Shui-bian, ran as an independent vice-presidential candidate (on the ticket of James Soong) in the 2000 election. Along with Soong, he established the People First Party in 2000, after their defeat in the presidential election. Chang was named the PFP's top choice as a fusion candidate for the 2002 Kaohsiung mayoral election. When Chang ended his campaign, the PFP moved to support Chang Po-ya. The Pan-Blue coalition formally selected Kuomintang member Huang Jun-ying. In 2006, Chang announced his retirement from politics after Soong heavily lost in the Taipei mayoral election.

2000 Republic of China presidential election results
Political affiliation	Candidate		Votes	
Political affiliation	President	Vice President	Total votes	Percentage
Democratic Progressive Party	Chen Shui-bian	Annette Lu	4,977,737	39.3%
Independent	James Soong	Chang Chau-hsiung	4,664,932	36.8%
Kuomintang	Lien Chan	Vincent Siew	2,925,513	23.1%
Independent	Hsu Hsin-liang	Josephine Chu	79,429	0.63%
New Party	Li Ao	Elmer Fung	16,782	0.13%
Total			12,786,671	82.69% voter turnout
Valid votes			12,664,393	
Invalid votes			122,278	

Chang resigned the vice chairmanship of the People's First Party in July 2016.

== Personal life ==
He is married to Lee Fang-hui (Chinese: 李芳惠; pinyin: Li Fanghui) with two sons.

== See also ==
- Politics of Taiwan
