= 2012 Taiwanese presidential election =

- 14 January 2012
- Opinion polls
- Registered: 18,086,455
- Turnout: 74.38% (▼1.95pp)
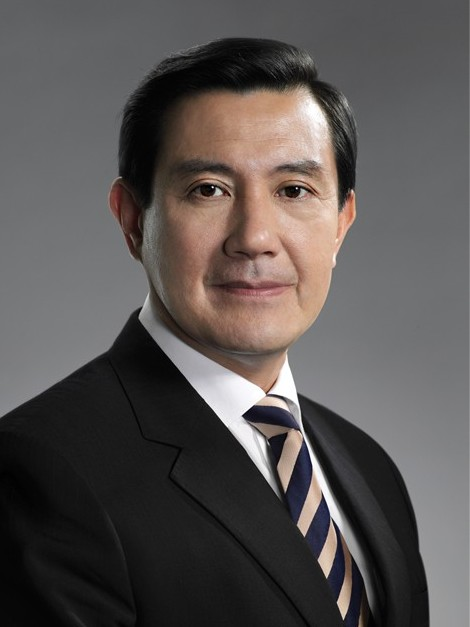

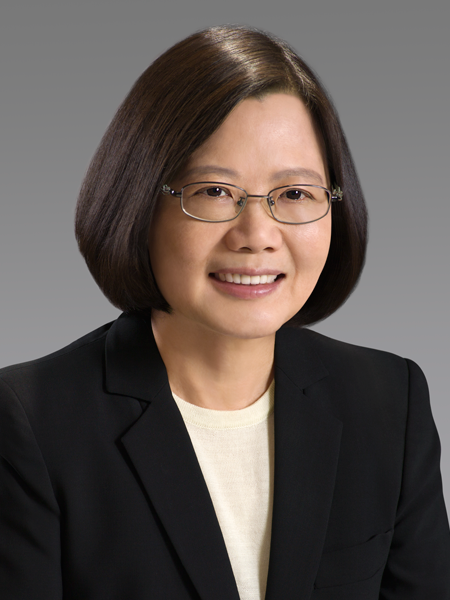
Nominee	Ma Ying-jeou	Tsai Ing-wen
Party	KMT	DPP
Running mate	Wu Den-yih	Su Jia-chyuan
Popular vote	6,891,139	6,093,578
Percentage	51.60%	45.63%
President before election
Ma Ying-jeou
KMT
Elected President
Ma Ying-jeou
KMT

Presidential elections were held in Taiwan on 14 January 2012. The election was held concurrently with legislative elections. It was the fifth direct election for the President of the Republic of China. Prior to 1996, the President was elected by the ROC's National Assembly and not directly by the people.

Incumbent Ma Ying-jeou was re-elected as President with 51.6% of the vote. DPP challenger Tsai Ing-wen resigned her post as chairperson of the DPP following her election defeat.

== Background ==
The Kuomintang (KMT) ticket won a landslide victory in 2008 over the incumbent Democratic Progressive Party, with a 2.2 million vote margin on 58% of the valid votes.

The administration of Ma Ying-jeou had been friendlier in policy towards the People's Republic of China and also signed the Economic Cooperation Framework Agreement (ECFA), a preferential trade agreement between the governments of the PRC and the ROC.

The Democratic Progressive Party was hit hard with former president Chen Shui-bian's corruption revelations, but new chairwoman Tsai Ing-wen rebuilt the party, leading to a series of victories in legislative by-elections and local elections.

One big election topic was the "1992 consensus", a term describing the declared outcome of a meeting in 1992 between the semi-official representatives of mainland China and Taiwan. The KMT agrees that this consensus should be the basis for negotiations with the PRC and supports it during the election, while the DPP believes that no such consensus was reached and that as a policy it is equivalent to the One-China principle, which the DPP opposes. Instead, the DPP has advocated that a "Taiwan consensus" be produced democratically, by the legislature and a referendum of the people of Taiwan.

== Candidates ==
As determined by a random draw, the DPP's Tsai-Su ticket was listed first on Election Day ballots; the incumbent KMT's Ma-Wu ticket was listed second; and the People First Party (PFP)'s Soong-Lin ticket, third.

=== Democratic Progressive Party ===
Incumbent chairperson Tsai Ing-wen was the DPP nominee. She was designated the party's candidate in April 2011 following a primary by opinion polls. Candidates for the DPP primary were Tsai, former premier Su Tseng-chang and former chairman Hsu Hsin-liang. Former Vice President Annette Lu Hsiu-lien announced her intention to run but withdrew. On 9 September 2012 candidate Tsai chose DPP secretary-general Su Jia-chyuan as her running mate.

==== Democratic Progressive nominees ====
2012 Democratic Progressive ticket
Tsai Ing-wen	Su Jia-chyuan
for President	for Vice President
Vice Premier of Taiwan (2006–2007)	Minister of the Council of Agriculture (2006–2008)

==== Democratic Progressive candidates ====
Su Tseng-chang	Hsu Hsin-liang
Premier (2006–2007)	Magistrate of Taoyuan County (1977–1979)
41.15% poll rating	12.21% poll rating

=== Kuomintang ===
Incumbent President Ma Ying-jeou was standing for re-election. There were no challengers within the party, so no primary was necessary.

Vice President Vincent Siew chose not to run for a second term, and on 19 June 2011 President Ma selected Premier Wu Den-yih as his running mate.

Ma's campaign was run by King Pu-tsung, a former party Secretary-General.

==== Kuomintang nominees ====
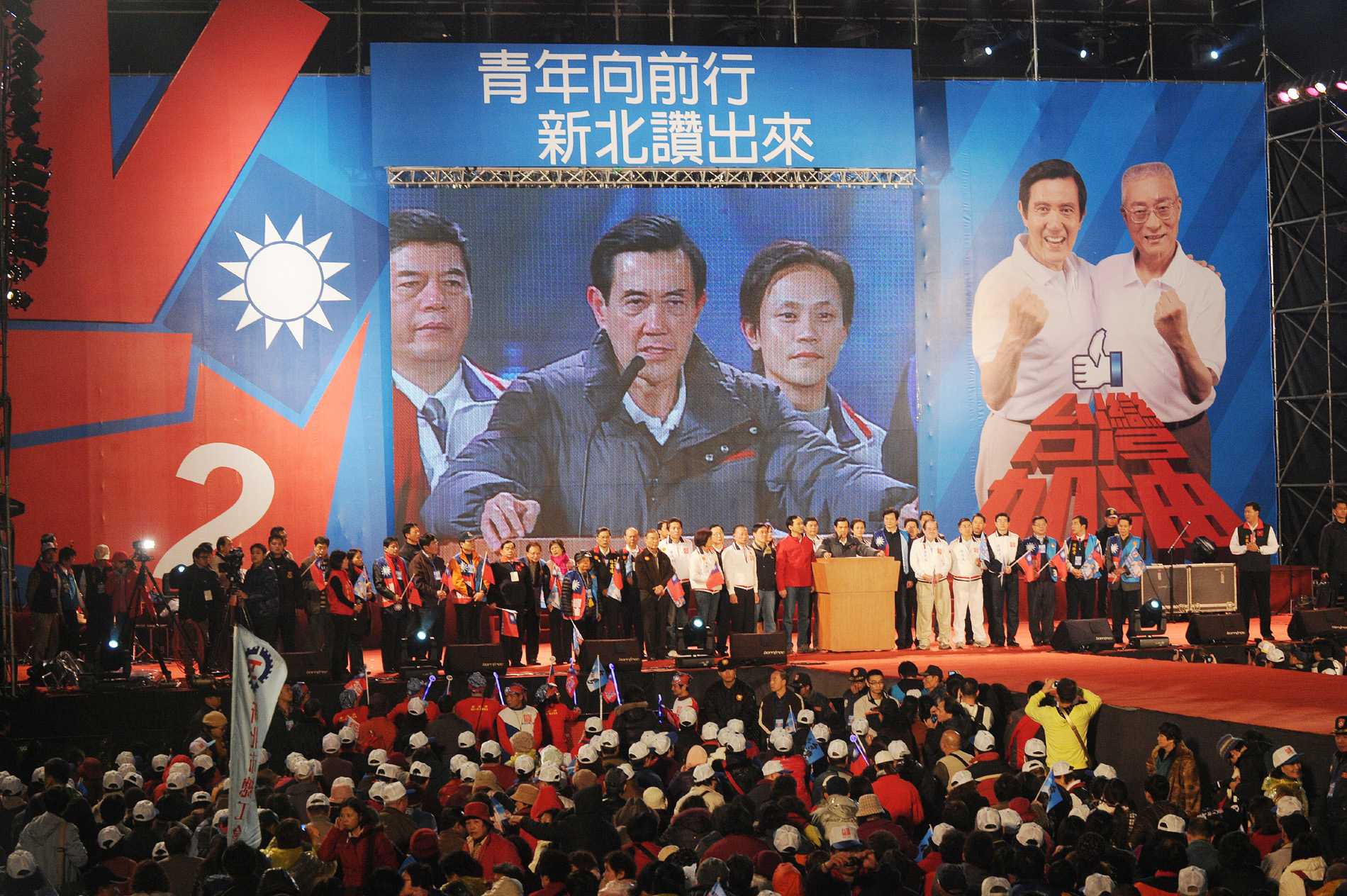
Ma Ying-jeou and Wu Den-yih election rally in Banqiao District, New Taipei.

2012 Kuomintang ticket
Ma Ying-jeou	Wu Den-yih
for President	for Vice President
President of Taiwan (2008–2012)	Premier of Taiwan (2009–2012)

=== People First Party ===
PFP chairman James Soong Chu-yu launched the party's first-ever presidential bid on 20 September 2011. Soong stated, however, that his candidacy was contingent on the success of a nationwide signature drive, organized by Kao Tsu-min and Yang Fu-mei. He vowed to run and keep his candidacy active through the election if his campaign garnered one million signatures throughout Taiwan.

Soong chose National Taiwan University professor emeritus Lin Ruey-shiung, a career scientist and academic with no political experience, to be his running mate.

Soong contended that the Taiwanese people desire a third choice outside the two main parties (KMT and DPP), despite concerns that his decision may split the Pan-Blue coalition vote to hand victory to the Pan-Green candidate as may have happened in the 2000 presidential election.

==== People First nominees ====
2012 People First ticket
James Soong	Lin Ruey-shiung
for President	for Vice President
Governor of Taiwan Province (1993–1998)	Dean of the National Taiwan; University Medical School (1993–1996)

== Opinion polls ==
Local regression of polls conducted since 2011

After initially trailing, Ma started to pick up the lead, without Soong as a candidate, after September 2011 in most opinion polls. However, Tsai benefited from the debates in the later stages.

== Results ==
Candidate	Running mate	Party	Votes	%
Ma Ying-jeou	Wu Den-yih	Kuomintang	6,891,139	51.60
Tsai Ing-wen	Su Jia-chyuan	Democratic Progressive Party	6,093,578	45.63
James Soong	Lin Ruey-shiung	People First Party	369,588	2.77
Total			13,354,305	100.00
Valid votes			13,354,305	99.27
Invalid/blank votes			97,711	0.73
Total votes			13,452,016	100.00
Registered voters/turnout			18,086,455	74.38
Source: CEC

Voting took place between 8:00 and 16:00 local time at 14,806 polling stations. After Ma's re-election, he announced that his victory had vindicated his policies in regards to cross-strait relations. Tsai conceded the election and resigned from her position as head of the DPP. Turnout was reported to be over 74%.

Ma Ying-jeou and Wu Den-yih were inaugurated as the President and Vice President of Taiwan respectively at the Presidential Office Building on 20 May 2012.

=== By administrative division ===
Subdivision	Electorate	1		2		3		Invalid	Turnout	Margin
Subdivision	Electorate	Tsai Ing-wen		Ma Ying-jeou		James Soong		Invalid	Turnout	Margin
Subdivision	Electorate	Su Jia-chyuan		Wu Den-yih		Lin Ruey-shiung		Invalid	Turnout	Margin
Subdivision	Electorate	Votes	%	Votes	%	Votes	%	Invalid	Turnout	Margin
Taipei City	2,102,664	634,565	39.54%	928,717	57.87%	41,448	2.58%	9,669	76.78%	294,152
New Taipei City	3,074,849	1,007,551	43.46%	1,245,673	53.73%	65,269	2.81%	15,215	75.90%	238,122
Keelung City	302,139	79,562	36.77%	128,294	59.29%	8,533	3.94%	1,414	72.09%	48,732
Yilan County	358,059	135,156	52.53%	115,496	44.89%	6,652	2.58%	2,437	72.54%	-19,660
Taoyuan County	1,506,311	445,308	39.85%	639,151	57.20%	32,927	2.95%	7,610	74.69%	193,843
Hsinchu County	384,261	89,741	30.93%	190,797	65.76%	9,599	3.31%	2,176	76.07%	101,056
Hsinchu City	312,118	92,632	39.49%	134,728	57.43%	7,216	3.08%	1,628	75.68%	42,096
Miaoli County	436,219	107,164	33.18%	206,200	63.85%	9,597	2.97%	2,600	74.63%	99,036
Taichung City	2,018,158	678,736	44.68%	792,334	52.16%	48,030	3.16%	9,953	75.76%	113,598
Changhua County	1,005,714	340,069	46.49%	369,968	50.58%	21,403	2.93%	7,367	73.46%	29,899
Nantou County	411,482	123,077	42.37%	158,703	54.63%	8,726	3.00%	2,165	71.13%	35,626
Yunlin County	563,034	214,141	55.81%	159,891	41.67%	9,662	2.51%	4,348	68.92%	-54,250
Chiayi County	431,588	181,463	58.58%	120,946	39.04%	7,364	2.38%	3,052	72.48%	-60,517
Chiayi City	205,711	76,711	51.04%	69,535	46.27%	4,042	2.69%	973	73.53%	-7,176
Tainan City	1,485,047	631,232	57.72%	435,274	39.80%	27,066	2.48%	8,090	74.18%	-195,958
Kaohsiung City	2,192,005	883,158	53.42%	730,461	44.19%	39,469	2.39%	10,944	75.91%	-152,697
Pingtung County	684,517	271,722	55.13%	211,571	42.93%	9,562	1.94%	4,571	72.67%	-60,151
Taitung County	178,938	33,417	30.50%	72,823	66.47%	3,313	3.02%	1,019	61.79%	39,406
Hualien County	263,888	43,845	25.94%	118,815	70.30%	6,359	3.76%	1,570	64.64%	74,970
Penghu County	77,817	20,717	45.65%	22,579	49.75%	2,082	4.58%	543	59.01%	1,862
Kinmen County	83,949	3,193	8.21%	34,676	89.23%	990	2.54%	316	46.67%	31,483
Lienchiang County	7,987	418	8.03%	4,507	86.60%	279	5.36%	51	65.79%	4,089
Source: CEC Overview Table CEC Visual Query

=== Maps ===

Result by County level

Result by Township level

Vote leader and vote share in township-level districts.

Vote leader in county-level districts.

Swing between the two major parties from the previous presidential election.

Winner vote lead over runner-up by township/city or district.

Size of lead between the two tickets.

=== Reactions ===
- China – The State Council's Taiwan Affairs Office stated Ma's reelection proved the developments in cross-strait relations during his term is "the correct path that has won the support of the majority of the Taiwanese compatriots."
- Hong Kong – Chief Executive candidate Henry Tang said the result reflects that Taiwanese people approve Ma's cross-strait policies, and expressed his wishes for peaceful and stable situation for economic development.
- Singapore – Even before the confirmation of the result, the Ministry of Foreign Affairs issued a statement congratulating Ma saying: "Singapore and Taiwan enjoy a close and friendly relationship which goes back many years [and that] they will continue to strengthen this relationship based on Singapore's "One China" policy." It added by wishing "all the parties success in working towards greater peace and prosperity, and securing the well-being of the future generations."
- United States – The White House issued a statement congratulating Ma and added it congratulates "the people of Taiwan on the successful conduct of their presidential and legislative elections;" also adding: "We hope the impressive efforts that both sides have undertaken in recent years to build cross-strait ties continue."
