= Shelley Rigger =

American political scientist and author (born 1962)

Shelley Rigger (born March 23, 1962) is an American political scientist and author. She is the Brown Professor of Asian Politics at Davidson College, where she has also served since 2022 as Vice President for Academic Affairs and Dean of the Faculty. She earned a Bachelor of Arts at Princeton University and a PhD at Harvard University.

== Books ==
- Politics in Taiwan: Voting for Democracy (Routledge, 1999)
- From Opposition to Power: Taiwan’s Democratic Progressive Party (Lynne Rienner Publishers, 2001)
- Why Taiwan Matters: Small Island, Global Powerhouse (2011)
- The Tiger Leading the Dragon: How Taiwan Propelled China’s Economic Rise (Rowman & Littlefield, 2021)
