= Lin Ruey-shiung =

Taiwanese physician-scientist, epigeneticist, and professor of public health (born 1938)

- 林瑞雄
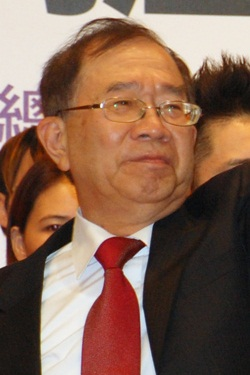
- Born: 17 December 1938 (age 87); Chiayi, Tainan Prefecture, Taiwan, Empire of Japan
- Citizenship: Empire of Japan (until 1945); Republic of China (since 1945); United States (until 2012)
- Education: National Taiwan University (MB, MPH); University of Heidelberg (MD); Johns Hopkins University (DPH)
- Occupation: Professor of public health
- Scientific career
- Fields: Epigenetics; Public health
- Institutions: National Taiwan University; University of Kansas; University of Maryland
- Thesis: An epidemiological study of familial patterns in cardiovascular mortality (1977)

Lin Ruey-shiung (Chinese: 林瑞雄; pinyin: Lín Ruìxióng; Pe̍h-ōe-jī: Lîm Sūi-hiông; born 17 December 1938) is a Taiwanese physician-scientist, epigeneticist, and professor of public health. He was the vice presidential nominee of the People First Party ticket for the 2012 Taiwan presidential race, running with James Soong. Prior to his vice presidential run, Lin never held political or elected office.

After graduating from medical school at National Taiwan University, Lin earned a doctorate in medicine from the University of Heidelberg in Germany and then a second doctorate in the United States from Johns Hopkins University in public health.

== Early life and education ==
Lin was born in Chiayi, Tainan Prefecture, on December 17, 1938. After graduating from National Tainan First Senior High School, he graduated from National Taiwan University with a Bachelor of Medicine (M.B.) in 1965 and a Master of Public Health (M.P.H.) in 1967. He then completed graduate studies in epigenetics in Germany at the University of Heidelberg, where he earned a doctorate (Dr. med.) in epidemiology and genetics in 1970.

After receiving his first doctorate from Heidelberg, Lin went to the United States to complete further advanced studies at Johns Hopkins University, where he earned a second doctorate, a Doctor of Public Health (D.P.H.), in 1977 from the Johns Hopkins Bloomberg School of Public Health. His second doctoral dissertation was titled, "An epidemiological study of familial patterns in cardiovascular mortality".

== Academic career ==
Lin has taught at the National Taiwan University Medical School, the University of Kansas, and the University of Maryland. He was a professor at National Taiwan University's School of Public Health from 1985 to 2006 and served as the school's dean from 1987 to 1993.

== 2012 election ==
PFP chairman James Soong chose Lin to be his ticket's vice presidential nominee in late-September 2011. Lin, a political novice, had to renounce his American citizenship (he had held dual citizenship of the United States and the Republic of China) in order to be an eligible candidate.

Lin claimed that for three consecutive nights, beginning Sept. 20, his residence was attacked by electromagnetic waves and that he had to flee to a hotel.
