= Kao Tsu-min =

Taiwanese physician and politician

Kao Tsu-min (Chinese: 高資敏; born 1939) is a Taiwanese physician and politician.

Kao is a native of Yunlin County. After graduating from Kaohsiung Medical University, he pursued further study in physiatry at New York University. Kao practiced medicine in the United States, and his medical career in America included a stint at the White House. He accepted a presidential appointment to the Legislative Yuan, serving from 1990 to 1993, as a representative of overseas Chinese.
