= Elmer Fung =

Taiwanese philosophy professor and politician (1948–2021)

Fung Hu-hsiang
- 馮滬祥
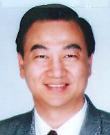
- Feng during his tenure on the Fourth Legislative Yuan

Member of Legislative Yuan
- In office 1 February 1999 – 31 January 2002
- Constituency: Taipei City

Personal details
- Born: 8 May 1948 Shanghai, Republic of China
- Died: 25 September 2021 (aged 73) Taipei, Taiwan
- Party: New Party (since 1993); Kuomintang (until 1993)
- Education: Tunghai University (BS); National Taiwan University (MA); Boston University (PhD)

Fung Hu-hsiang (Chinese: 馮滬祥; pinyin: Féng Hùxiáng; 8 May 1948 – 25 September 2021), also known by his English name Elmer Fung, was a Taiwanese philosophy professor and politician. A member of the New Party, he represented Taipei City in the Legislative Yuan from 1999 to 2002. In 2000, he and Li Ao formed the New Party presidential ticket, which finished fifth.

== Education ==
Fung graduated from Tunghai University with a Bachelor of Science (B.S.) in chemistry in 1970 and earned a Master of Arts (M.A.) in philosophy from National Taiwan University in 1974. He then completed doctoral studies in the United States, where he earned his Ph.D. in philosophy from Boston University in 1978. His doctoral dissertation, completed under philosophy professors Robert S. Cohen and Marx W. Wartofsky, was titled, "Marxist humanism and Confucian humanism: A comparative study of the concept of man".

== Academic career ==
Fung became the head of the Department of Philosophy of Tunghai University in 1979. He co-chaired the Research Center of Philosophy of the same college from 1983 to 1986. After leaving Tunghai, Fung served as the Dean of College of Liberal Arts of National Central University from 1986 to 1988.

== Political career ==
Fung was secretary to President Chiang Ching-kuo from 1979 to 1986; advisor to premier Hau Pei-tsun from 1991 to 1992; an honorary chairman of the Service Centre Across the Taiwan Strait; and a member of the National Assembly. In 1986, Chen Shui-bian was jailed for eight months for libel after his pro-opposition magazine accused, among other things, Fung of plagiarism. His argument in court was he merely translated an English book for his doctoral thesis. The court ruled in his favor and sentenced Chen Shui-bian to jail for libel.

He and Li Ao formed the New Party ticket in the 2000 presidential election. Only Fung showed up to represent the New Party at a post-election press conference, where he stated that Chen Shui-bian won only because President Lee Teng-hui chose to "Dump Lien to save Chen."

Shortly after the election, First Lady of the Republic of China Tseng Wen-hui sued Fung, Hsieh Chi-ta, and Tai Chi for defamation. The three were cleared of charges, but fined upon appeal to the Taiwan High Court. Hsieh refused to pay the fine and was imprisoned for three months. The Supreme Court heard an appeal of the case in 2010, and upheld the rulings for both Fung and Tai.

In 2001, the Taiwan Association of University Professors ranked him at the top of a list delineating thirteen of the worst legislators. Shortly after stepping down from the Legislative Yuan in 2002, Fung started a business in China.

In 2003, investigator Ko Ching-ming named Fung one of the people who had collaborated with the Taiwan Garrison Command in 1974 to expel thirteen philosophy professors from National Taiwan University, where Fung was then a student.

In February 2004, a Taiwan-based foreign labourers' organization publicly accused Fung of raping his Filipina housekeeper. At least two incidents were alleged to have occurred, once in November 2003 and another in January 2004. Soon after the accusation, Democratic Progressive Party legislators discussed removing Fung from his position as a counselor to the legislature. On 8 July 2005 the presiding judge found him guilty based on matching DNA evidence. The decision was appealed to the Taiwan High Court, which upheld the ruling in 2007 and again in 2008. After the first High Court ruling, the Supreme Court offered to review the case. The Taiwan High Court heard the case again, and in February 2012 had cleared Fung of the charges because the housekeeper had made a statement recanting her accusations. However, in December, the High Court chose to reverse its ruling, stating that the housekeeper's earlier statements and assorted medical evidence showed that the accusation was not a lie. After a total of seven High Court trials, the Supreme Court ruled on the case in October 2016, and sentenced Fung to three years and four months imprisonment. Fung claimed he was severely ill, and his sentence was suspended until the completion of a health examination. Fung eventually served 85 days of the sentence before he was released on medical parole in January 2017.

== Death ==
Fung fell in mid-September 2021, and sought medical treatment for a fracture. During his hospital stay, doctors discovered that cancer had recurred, and Fung died on 25 September 2021.
