= 2000 Taiwanese presidential election =

- 18 March 2000
- Registered: 15,462,625
- Turnout: 82.69% (▲6.65pp)
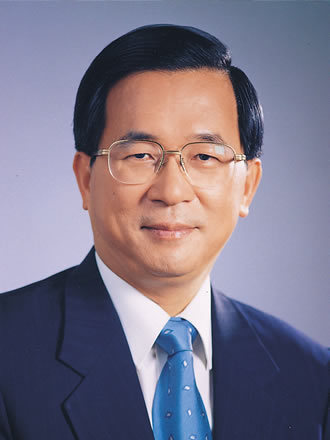

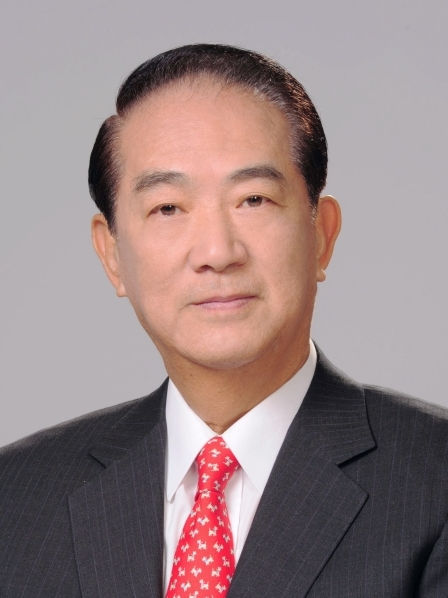

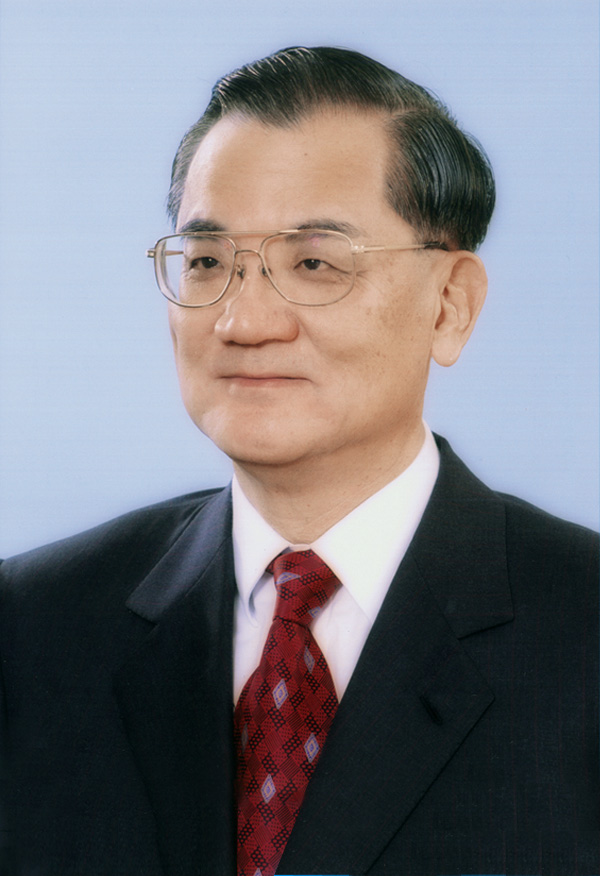
Nominee	Chen Shui-bian	James Soong	Lien Chan
Party	DPP	Independent	KMT
Running mate	Annette Lu	Chang Chau-hsiung	Vincent Siew
Popular vote	4,977,697	4,664,972	2,925,513
Percentage	39.30%	36.84%	23.10%
President before election
Lee Teng-hui
KMT
Elected President
Chen Shui-bian
DPP

Presidential elections were held in Taiwan on 18 March 2000 to elect the president and vice president. With a voter turnout of 83%, Chen Shui-bian and Annette Lu of the Democratic Progressive Party (DPP) were elected president and vice president respectively with a slight plurality.

This election ended more than half a century of Kuomintang (KMT) rule on the island, during which it had governed as a one-party state since the retreat of the government from mainland China during the closing stages of the Chinese Civil War in 1949. This was also the first time in Chinese history that a ruling political party peacefully transferred power to an opposition party under a democratic system. The nominees included the then-current vice president Lien Chan for the KMT, former provincial governor James Soong as an independent candidate (upon his loss of the KMT nomination), and former Taipei mayor Chen Shui-bian for the DPP.

Controversy arose throughout the course of the election; in particular, the candidacy of James Soong was beset by accusations of splitting the Kuomintang vote and involvement in corruption during the presidency of Lee Teng-hui, culminating in protests and the expulsion of the latter from the Kuomintang, while Chen's campaign attracted criticism from neighboring China due to his party's traditionally pro-independence stance. The issues of corruption and cross-strait relations were dominant during this election. Chen's victory was initially seen as unlikely, but several compounded effects like the splitting of the Kuomintang vote and the aforementioned controversies are seen as having led to his victory. Chen performed most strongly in the southern part of Taiwan, while Soong tended to win in northern areas.

== Candidates and platforms ==
=== Kuomintang ===
The ruling Kuomintang (KMT) ran vice president Lien Chan for president and Premier Vincent Siew for vice president. Both were career civil servants and Lien, originating from the Taiwanese elite, was seen as aloof and unable to empathize with the common people.

Though more popular and consistently ranked higher in the polls, the outspoken former Taiwan governor James Soong failed to gain the Kuomintang's nomination. As a result, he announced his candidacy as an independent candidate. The Kuomintang responded by expelling Soong in November 1999. It is a very common belief among KMT supporters that president Lee Teng-hui was secretly supporting Chen Shui-bian, and purposely supported the less popular Lien in order to split the Kuomintang, and this belief was given a great deal of credibility after the 2000 election with Lee's defection to the Pan-Green coalition, though Lee's defection came only after his expulsion by the KMT. Soong, a mainlander, tried to appeal to the native Taiwanese by nominating surgeon Chang Chao-hsiung, who is a native Taiwanese, as his running-mate. This, combined with the fact that Chang had connections to both the Democratic Progressive Party and the KMT reinforced Soong's campaign message of bridging political and cultural divide.

In December 1999 the KMT began to attack Soong's integrity. They sued Soong for theft, alleging that as party secretary-general, he stole millions of Taiwan dollars in cash intended for the family of the late president Chiang Ching-kuo and hid the money in the Chunghsing Bills Finance Co. Soong defended himself by saying he was acting under Lee's direction, though Lee denied this and many found the explanation unconvincing. Initially holding a commanding lead in the polls, Soong ended up losing by just over 300,000 votes.

Both candidates had some obstacles presenting themselves as reform candidates with regard to corruption, given their high rank in the Kuomintang government. Soong's strategy was to openly admit his past wrongdoing and present his insider status as an advantage: i.e. that he could most easily tackle the corruption because of his experience with it; however, many saw his credibility as a reformer as broken by his financial scandal. Lien advocated for reform, but had some difficulty in direct criticism as such attacks may have offended the ruling government; this is thought to have contributed to his defeat.

=== Democratic Progressive Party ===
The DPP ran former Taipei mayor Chen Shui-bian and Taoyuan County magistrate Annette Lu for vice president. Having run for the 1996 election on a radical independence platform and lost by a landslide, the DPP in May 1999 moderated its stance by issuing the "Resolution on the Future of Taiwan". The resolution accepted the status quo and promoted the moderate view that Taiwan was already independent, so any formal declaration would not be urgently necessary, if at all, and Chen presented a more conciliatory stance regarding the mainland. Also included was the pledge that any change in Taiwan's international status will have to be done through a referendum, thus alleviating the fear that, if elected, a DPP government would unilaterally declare independence without popular approval. The Chen-Lu ticket also promised to be more aggressive in fighting black gold, a system of connections and corruption which had become intertwined with the KMT. The last minute public endorsement of Chen Shui-bian by President of the Academia Sinica and Nobel laureate Yuan T. Lee is also thought to have played a role in his election, with Yuan T. Lee offering to negotiate with the PRC on Taiwan's behalf.

=== Other candidates ===
All independent presidential tickets were required to turn in a petition of 224,000 names to the Central Election Commission to confirm their candidacy and appear on the ballot.

Former DPP Chairman Hsu Hsin-liang, who had quit the party after failing to prevent Chen from running, ran as an independent with New Party (NP) legislator Josephine Chu as his running mate. As DPP Chairman, Hsu had moderated the platform of the party, promoting reconciliation with the People's Republic of China and the opening of direct links, a move not then supported by the KMT. During the 2000 campaign, the Hsu-Chu ticket promoted unification under something similar to, but not the same as, 'one country, two systems', claiming that that exact system would be "bound to bring immediate loss to Taiwan".

The New Party nominated independent social commentator Li Ao—an acclaimed author, historian, and former political prisoner—for president and legislator Elmer Fung for vice president. Li, who supported "one country, two systems", said he took the election as an opportunity to educate the people in Taiwan on his ideas, and show them the nation's "dark side". Despite his nomination Li refused to join the NP. Both he and the NP publicly encouraged people to vote for James Soong to the point of stating during the televised presidential debates that he was not planning to vote for himself and that people should vote for Soong so that the pro-unification vote would not be split.

A white paper issued by the People's Republic of China (PRC) prior to the election had mentioned that they would "not permit the 'Taiwan question' to drag on", which generated condemnation from American leaders, including John Kerry and Stanley Roth; along with a downturn in the stock market, but little in terms of a Taiwanese reaction. Then, shortly before the election, Zhu Rongji, the premier of the People's Republic of China attempted to influence the outcome, warning that voters should "not just act on impulse at this juncture, which will decide the future course that China and Taiwan will follow" and should "shun a pro-independence candidate", further stating that "[n]o matter who comes into power in Taiwan, Taiwan will never be allowed to be independent. This is our bottom line and the will of 1.25 billion Chinese people." According to Christopher R. Hughes, emeritus professor of International Relations at the London School of Economics, a conclusion was made that the statements of Chinese government had actually been counterproductive and helped Chen to win; consequently, China avoided making such an open attempt to influence the 2004 elections, adopting a "wait and see" attitude with Chen.

== Results ==
Voting was held on 18 March 2000. The Soong-Chang ticket appeared first on the ballot, followed by the Kuomintang's Lien and Siew, then two independent tickets, Li-Fung and Hsu-Chu. The eventual winning DPP ticket of Chen and Lu were listed fifth. Chen's ticket won by a margin of about 2.46%, ahead of Soong in second place and Chan in third. Generally, the Soong ticket led in the northern half of Taiwan, while the Chen ticket led in the south; however, there were exceptions, including Yilan County in the north, whose vote Chen won, and Taitung County in the south, whose vote Soong won.

Candidate	Running mate	Party	Votes	%
Chen Shui-bian	Annette Lu	Democratic Progressive Party	4,977,697	39.30
James Soong	Chang Chau-hsiung	Independent	4,664,972	36.84
Lien Chan	Vincent Siew	Kuomintang	2,925,513	23.10
Hsu Hsin-liang	Josephine Chu	Independent	79,429	0.63
Li Ao	Elmer Fung	New Party	16,782	0.13
Total			12,664,393	100.00
Valid votes			12,664,393	99.04
Invalid/blank votes			122,278	0.96
Total votes			12,786,671	100.00
Registered voters/turnout			15,462,625	82.69
Source: CEC

=== By administrative division ===
Subdivision	Electorate	1		2		3		4		5		Invalid	Turnout	Margin
Subdivision	Electorate	James Soong		Lien Chan		Li Ao		Hsu Hsin-liang		Chen Shui-bian		Invalid	Turnout	Margin
Subdivision	Electorate	Chang Chau-hsiung		Vincent Siew		Elmer Fung		Josephine Chu		Annette Lu		Invalid	Turnout	Margin
Subdivision	Electorate	Votes	%	Votes	%	Votes	%	Votes	%	Votes	%	Invalid	Turnout	Margin
Taipei City	1,914,915	631,538	39.79%	347,564	21.90%	1,876	0.12%	8,723	0.25%	597,465	37.64%	12,449	83.53%	-34,073
Taipei County	2,437,456	812,821	40.26%	451,707	22.37%	2,384	0.12%	10,641	0.53%	741,596	36.73%	22,711	83.77%	-71,225
Keelung City	275,256	106,032	47.01%	48,545	21.52%	295	0.13%	1,116	0.49%	69,555	30.84%	1,958	82.65%	-36,477
Yilan County	325,691	86,549	33.05%	51,082	19.51%	350	0.13%	736	0.28%	123,157	47.30%	2,029	81.03%	36,608
Taoyuan County	1,134,413	413,370	43.83%	208,881	22.15%	1,140	0.12%	20,581	2.18%	299,120	31.72%	11,628	84.16%	-114,250
Hsinchu County	295,192	128,231	51.58%	51,442	20.69%	309	0.12%	7,093	2.85%	61,533	24.25%	2,607	85.10%	-66,698
Hsinchu City	249,395	88,412	42.83%	46,234	22.40%	292	0.14%	1,746	0.85%	69,760	33.97%	2,185	83.65%	-18,652
Miaoli County	390,780	160,533	49.54%	71,798	22.20%	399	0.12%	3,931	1.22%	86,707	26.81%	3,298	83.59%	-73,826
Taichung County	992,527	318,499	38.10%	206,832	24.74%	1,176	0.14%	4,304	0.51%	305,219	36.51%	9,344	85.17%	-13,280
Taichung City	636,533	217,486	41.37%	111,391	21.19%	616	0.12%	2,463	0.47%	193,796	36.86%	5,000	83.38%	-23,690
Changhua County	896,075	251,310	33.71%	191,685	25.71%	1,070	0.14%	2,811	0.38%	298,571	40.05%	7,997	84.08%	47,261
Nantou County	383,478	144,863	46.94%	56,025	18.15%	395	0.13%	914	0.30%	106,440	34.49%	2,622	81.17%	-38,423
Yunlin County	538,140	114,188	27.70%	102,177	24.78%	975	0.24%	1,230	0.30%	193,715	45.99%	3,298	77.23%	79,527
Chiayi County	410,702	85,890	26.98%	73,409	23.06%	561	0.18%	920	0.29%	157,512	49.49%	3,006	78.23%	71,622
Chiayi City	183,325	43,773	29.34%	34,670	23.24%	169	0.11%	448	0.30%	70,124	47.01%	1,134	82.00%	26,351
Tainan County	789,844	136,217	21.10%	159,443	24.70%	1,164	0.18%	1,582	0.25%	347,210	53.78%	5,531	82.44%	210,993
Tainan City	508,517	114,299	27.53%	107,679	25.93%	580	0.14%	1,408	0.34%	191,261	45.06%	3,282	82.30%	76,962
Kaohsiung City	1,042,117	259,023	29.78%	208,544	23.97%	877	0.10%	3,103	0.36%	398,381	45.79%	8,103	84.25%	139,358
Kaohsiung County	874,875	206,616	28.43%	174,021	23.95%	1,024	0.14%	2,478	0.34%	342,553	47.14%	5,851	83.73%	135,937
Pingtung County	647,524	131,371	25.48%	142,934	27.73%	692	0.13%	1,939	0.38%	238,572	45.28%	4,008	80.23%	107,201
Taitung County	177,706	63,913	52.78%	28,659	23.66%	136	0.11%	294	0.24%	28,102	23.20%	1,418	68.95%	-35,811
Hualien County	252,771	109,962	58.81%	36,042	19.28%	194	0.10%	736	0.39%	40,044	21.24%	2,201	74.84%	-69,918
Penghu County	64,887	17,723	39.55%	10,418	23.25%	64	0.14%	119	0.27%	16,487	36.79%	388	69.66%	-1,236
Kinmen County	35,808	19,991	81.81%	3,543	14.50%	37	0.15%	105	0.43%	759	3.11%	214	68.84%	-19,232
Lienchiang County	4,698	2,362	73.31%	787	24.43%	7	0.22%	8	0.25%	58	1.80%	16	68.92%	-2,304
出典：CEC Overview Table CEC Visual Query

=== Maps ===

Result by County level

Result by Township level

Vote leader and vote share in township-level districts.

Vote leader in county-level districts.

National winner vs. national runner-up vote difference by township/city or district (Note: The third-place ticket led in some township-level units.)

== Aftermath ==
Chen's victory was seen as unlikely before Soong's financial scandal broke out. Under the first-past-the-post voting system, the split of the KMT vote between James Soong and Lien Chan, who together polled nearly 60% of the vote (compared to Chen's 39%), played a large role in the Taiwan independence-leaning candidate Chen's victory. Soong Chu-yu's financial scandals, Nobel laureate Lee Yuan-tseh's endorsement, and arguably the last minute saber-rattling by the PRC tipped the balance to Chen's favor. Chen's victory marked the first time since the retreat from the mainland that a party other than the KMT won the presidency, ending 50 years of rule by the latter, which was partly under a one-party state. This also marked the first peaceful transition of power under a democratic regime in Chinese history.

As the results were announced, several thousand protesters, mostly KMT loyalists who believed Lee Teng-hui had intentionally tried to sabotage the pro-unification vote, gathered outside the KMT headquarters in Taipei and demanded Lee resign as Chairman. Lee promised to resign at the party congress in September 2000. Though the protest was without permit, the government did not order an end to it, though Taipei mayor Ma Ying-jeou attempted to dispel the crowd on the first night. The protesters blocked the entrances to the building and kept Lee holed in his office for hours until riot police with water cannon were able to open a path for the motorcade. Protesters also dragged presidential advisor Hsu Li-teh out of his car and beat him. The protests ended in success on 24 March when Lee resigned as KMT Chairman and was replaced by Lien. Ma Ying-jeou also resigned from the Central Standing Committee of the KMT as a result of his dissatisfaction with the leadership at the time, calling for reform.

On the day of the election, Soong announced the formation of the People First Party before a crowd of his supporters, though he urged calm and the avoidance of "bloodshed". In the following party congress, Lien Chan was able to achieve Lee's expulsion and began to move the party back towards a unificationist platform. Lee and his supporters later formed the radical pro-independence Taiwan Solidarity Union. Lee was expelled from KMT on 21 September 2001, the first party chairman thus far to have membership revoked. To avoid a repeat of the 2000 split, Lien and Soong agreed to run on a single ticket as president and vice president, respectively, in the 2004 election. They made the announcement on 14 February 2003, more than a year before the next presidential election. Nevertheless, they were still defeated by Chen Shui-bian in the next election.

Some authors, including John Fuh-hsieng Hsieh and Shelley Rigger, surmised that Chen Shui-bian's ascent to the presidency was not as groundbreaking as might be thought: the presidency's supposed power was largely drawn from the power a KMT leader would have when both the legislature and the presidency were controlled by the party, but the government of Taiwan was largely dominated by the legislative branch, which remained under the control of the KMT. As such, Chen ascended into a relatively weak presidency. Consequently, Chen's first cabinet consisted of some KMT members along with DPP members. However, after the legislative elections in 2001, Chen was expected to be able to exert more influence, due to the KMT's loss of a majority. Chen's more pro-independence stance initially caused concerns on behalf of the United States to raise such that they sent senior officials to the PRC to ease tensions. Tensions later relaxed, though a somewhat rocky relationship remained.

== Bibliography ==
- Chang, Pao-min (June 1996). "The Dynamics of Taiwan's Democratization and Crisis in the Taiwan Strait". Contemporary Southeast Asia. 18 (1): 1–16. JSTOR 25798317. Archived from the original on 2 November 2022.
- Copper, James F. (2000). "Taiwan's 2000 Presidential and Vice Presidential Election: Consolidating Democracy and Creating a New Era of Politics". Maryland Series in Contemporary Asian Studies (2): 1–66. Archived from the original on 15 August 2022.
- Hsieh, John Fuh-sheng (December 2001). "Whither the Kuomintang?*". The China Quarterly. 168: 930–943. doi:10.1017/s0009443901000547. S2CID 154769884. Archived from the original on 2 November 2022.
- Ling, Yu-Long; Ger, Yeong-Kuang (April 2000). "The Great Showdown: Taiwan's Presidential Election in the Year 2000*". American Journal of Chinese Studies. 7 (1): 1–27. JSTOR 44288614. Archived from the original on 2 November 2022.
- Rigger, Shelley (December 2001). "The Democratic Progressive Party in 2000: Obstacles and Opportunities" (PDF). The China Quarterly. 168: 944–959. doi:10.1017/s0009443901000559. S2CID 154393722. Archived (PDF) from the original on 23 December 2021.
- Schafferer, Christian (2003). "The legislative Yuan election, Taiwan 2001". Electoral Studies. 22 (3): 532–537. doi:10.1016/s0261-3794(02)00068-9. Archived from the original on 2 November 2022.
- Simon, Scott; Wang, Fu-cheng; Wong, Joseph; Laliberté, André; Henderson, Robert D'A. (2004). "Domestic and International Considerations of Taiwan's 2004 Presidential Election: An Interdisciplinary Roundtable". Pacific Affairs. 77 (4): 683–713. JSTOR 40023538. Archived from the original on 2 November 2022.
- Wang, T. Y. (2001). "Cross-Strait Relations After the 2000 Election in Taiwan". Asian Survey. 41 (5): 716–736. doi:10.1525/as.2001.41.5.716. JSTOR 10.1525/as.2001.41.5.716. Archived from the original on 3 November 2022.
