= Josephine Chu =

Taiwanese politician

Chu Hui-liang MLY
- 朱惠良
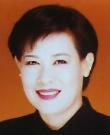
- Chu as a member of the Third Legislative Yuan

Member of the Legislative Yuan
- In office 1 February 1996 – 31 January 2002
- Constituency: Taipei 2

Personal details
- Born: 16 December 1950 (age 75) Nantou City, Taiwan
- Education: National Taiwan University (BA, MA); Princeton University (MA, PhD)
- Profession: Museum director

Chu Hui-liang (Chinese: 朱惠良; pinyin: Zhū Huìliáng; born 16 December 1950), also known by her English name Josephine Chu, is a Taiwanese art historian and former politician. She served in the Legislative Yuan from 1996 to 2002. Chu and Hsu Hsin-liang formed an independent ticket in the 2000 presidential election, finishing fourth.

== Early life and education ==
Chu was born in Nantou City in 1950 to a waishengren family. She graduated from National Taiwan University with a Bachelor of Arts (B.A.) in history in 1974 and earned a master's degree from the university in art history in 1977. She won a government scholarship to complete graduate studies in the United States, where she studied Chinese and Japanese art at Princeton University under historians Wen Fong and Frederick W. Mote.

As a graduate student at Princeton University, Chu received a Mellon Fellowship to study at the Metropolitan Museum of Art in New York City. She earned a Master of Arts (M.A.) in art and archaeology and her Ph.D. in art and archaeology in 1990 from Princeton. Her doctoral dissertation was titled, "The Chung Yu (A.D. 151–230) Tradition: A Pivotal Development in Sung Calligraphy".

== Academic career ==
After receiving her doctorate from Princeton, Chu became a research fellow at the National Palace Museum. She also held associate professorships at National Taiwan University and the National Institute of the Arts.

== Political career ==
Chu served two terms in the Legislative Yuan, winning the 1995 and 1998 elections. Throughout her legislative career, she was occasionally covered in local media as a New Party politician, but most often as an independent. Chu and Hsu Hsin-liang formed an independent ticket in the 2000 presidential election, won by Chen Shui-bian and Annette Lu. Chu ran for the Hsinchu district seat in the legislative elections of 2001 with the endorsement of the Gender Sexuality Rights Association, but lost.

=== Political stances ===
Chu has worked to expand LGBT rights in Taiwan, and has advocated for rights of foreign spouses.

Chu backed efforts to maintain an unbiased media, as well as cultural outreach initiatives. To this end, she supported a proposal by the Taiwan Media Watch Foundation to have government workers barred from working in the media, and has criticized political interference in the Public Television Service. In 2001, she expressed support for expanding the National Palace Museum to southern Taiwan, a project that was not completed until 2015.

When the United States government announced that it would not ratify the Kyoto Protocol, Chu sought a meeting with the American Institute in Taiwan to argue for the ratification of the treaty. In 2004, she criticized the Chen Shui-bian administration for backing a NT$610.8 billion proposal to acquire American weapons, saying that the results of the cross-strait referendum showed that most Taiwanese did not approve of the action.

== Later career ==
After leaving politics, Chu taught at Taipei National University of the Arts. In 2009, she returned to the National Palace Museum as assistant director of educational outreach, assuming the departmental head position the next year.
