= People First Party (Taiwan) =

People First Party 親民黨
- Leader: James Soong
- Founded: 31 March 2000
- Split from: Kuomintang
- Headquarters: Taipei, Taiwan
- Ideology: Liberal conservatism
- Political position: Centre to centre-right
- National affiliation: Pan-Blue Coalition
- Colors: Orange
- Legislative Yuan: 0 / 113
- Municipal mayors: 0 / 6
- Magistrates/mayors: 0 / 16
- Councilors: 2 / 912
- Township/city mayors: 0 / 204

Party flag
- PFP Flag

Website
- www.pfp.org.tw

People First Party
- Traditional Chinese: 親民黨
- Simplified Chinese: 亲民党
Transcriptions
Standard Mandarin
- Hanyu Pinyin: Qīnmín Dǎng
- Bopomofo: ㄑㄧㄣ ㄇㄧㄣˊ ㄉㄤˇ
Hakka
- Pha̍k-fa-sṳ: Chhîn-mìn Tóng
Southern Min
- Hokkien POJ: Chhin-bîn-tóng

The People First Party (PFP, Chinese: 親民黨; pinyin: Qīnmín Dǎng; Pe̍h-ōe-jī: Chhin-bîn-tóng) is a centrist to centre-right political party in Taiwan.

The party was founded by James Soong in March 2000 after his failed independent presidential bid earlier in the March 2000 presidential election; Soong was previously expelled from the Kuomintang after launching an independent bid. In the 2001 legislative election, it became the third-largest party in the Legislative Yuan. In the 2004 presidential election, the KMT-PFP joint ticket of Lien Chan and James Soong narrowly lost to President Chen Shui-bian. In the 2008 legislative election, the party lost all but one of its seats, though it rebounded to three seats in the 2012 legislative election.

Soong ran again in the 2012 and 2016 presidential elections, gathering 2.77% and 12.84% of the vote respectively. In 2020, Soong announced his last presidential bid; he lost the election with a vote share of 4.26%. In the concurrent 2020 legislative election, the PFP lost all of its seats in the Legislative Yuan.

== History ==
The PFP was founded by James Soong and his supporters after his failed independent bid for the presidency in 2000. Soong was previously a member of the Kuomintang but was expelled from the party after he announced an independent presidential bid. Soong himself is the chairman, and dominates much of its politics. The name of the party, People First (親民), has Confucian connotations. (Note: 親民 literally means "to be close to the people." The Great Learning states, "What the Great Learning teaches, is—to illustrate illustrious virtue; to renovate the people; and to rest in the highest excellence" (Tr. Legge, 大學之道明明德，在親民，在止於至善。))

The party maintains a close but tense relationship with the Kuomintang (KMT) as part of the pan-blue coalition. However, since PFP had, like the New Party, evolved from KMT, the two parties has had to compete for the same set of voters. The simultaneous competition and cooperation between the KMT and PFP have resulted in intricate political dynamics.

In several notable cases, this has led to situations in which both parties have run candidates, but close to the election the party with the less popular candidate unofficially dropped out of the race. This in turn has led to some notable situations when either the PFP or the KMT has campaigned against its own candidate, which has led to intra-party resentment.

To avoid a repeat of this effect, which led to the election of Democratic Progressive Party candidate Chen Shui-bian to the presidency in 2000 by a low share of votes, Chairman Soong ran as vice-president on KMT Chairman Lien Chan's presidential ticket in the 2004 presidential election.

After his defeat in the Taipei mayoral elections held on 9 December 2006, Soong announced that he would retire from politics. At this point, with no clear goals, the PFP faced an uncertain future, and considered merging with the Kuomintang (KMT). After much negotiation, the PFP and the KMT did not merge.

=== Presidential bids ===
In September 2011, James Soong mounted the PFP's first presidential bid and selected academic Ruey-Shiung Lin to be his running mate for the 2012 election, collecting enough signatures to make it on the ballot. While analysts feared that a PFP run would split the Pan-Blue Coalition vote and hand a winnable election to the DPP (as was the case in the 2000 Presidential election), Soong insisted that his campaign was a serious one and that he would complete his run. On election day, the Soong-Lin ticket underperformed and garnered 2.77% of votes, while Ma Ying-jeou of the KMT defeated Tsai Ing-wen of the DPP by a margin of 51.60% to 45.63%. In the concurrent legislative election the PFP won 5.46% of the party-list vote, gaining them two seats in the Legislative Yuan, and in addition won one district seat for a total of three seats.

Soong would launch presidential bids in 2016 and 2020 as well. In 2016, he would garner 12.84% of the vote, compared with 31.04% going to Eric Chu of the KMT and 56.12% going to Tsai Ing-wen of the DPP. In 2020 he would garner 4.26% of the vote, compared with 38.61% going to Han Kuo-yu of the KMT and 57.13% going to Tsai Ing-wen of the DPP. In 2016, they would maintain their seats in the legislature; however, in 2020, the PFP failed to meet the 5% threshold for party-list representation and also did not win any district seats, and was no longer represented in the Legislative Yuan. Prior to the election result in 2020, James Soong announced that his 2020 bid would be his last, throwing the future of the party into question.

== Political positions ==
The People First Party is considered to be a centrist or centre-right political party.

The official goals of PFP, as regards cross-strait relationships and diplomacy, is for the ROC to: participate in more international organizations, promote Chinese culture overseas and seek economic and cultural interaction between Taiwan and the mainland. Its views are seen as generally favorable towards Chinese unification and staunchly against Taiwan independence.

== Election results ==
=== Presidential elections ===
Election	Candidate	Running mate	Total votes	Share of votes	Outcome
2000	James Soong Chu-yu	Chang Chau-hsiung	4,664,932	36.8%	Defeated ✗
2004	Lien Chan ( KMT)	James Soong Chu-yu	6,423,906	49.8%	Defeated ✗
2012	James Soong Chu-yu	Lin Ruey-shiung	369,588	2.77%	Defeated ✗
2016	James Soong Chu-yu	Hsu Hsin-ying ( MKT)	1,576,861	12.84%	Defeated ✗
2020	James Soong Chu-yu	Sandra Yu	608,590	4.26%	Defeated ✗

=== Legislative elections ===
Election	Total seats won	Total votes	Share of votes	Seat changes	Election leader	Status	President
2001	46 / 225	1,917,836	20.3%	▲29 seats	James Soong Chu-yu	3rd Party	Chen Shui-bian
2004	34 / 225	1,350,613	14.78%	▼12 seats	James Soong Chu-yu	3rd Party	Chen Shui-bian
2008	1 / 113	28,254	0.3%	▼33 seats	James Soong Chu-yu	4th Party	Chen Shui-bian
2008	1 / 113	28,254	0.3%	▼33 seats	James Soong Chu-yu	4th Party	Ma Ying-jeou
2012	3 / 113	722,089	5.49%	▲2 seats	James Soong Chu-yu	4th Party	Ma Ying-jeou
2016	3 / 113	794,838	6.52%	0 seats	James Soong Chu-yu	4th Party	Tsai Ing-wen
2020	0 / 113	518,921	3.66%	▼3 seats	James Soong Chu-yu	Did not represent	Tsai Ing-wen
2024	0 / 113	69,817	0.51%	0 seats	James Soong Chu-yu	Did not represent	Lai Ching-te

=== Local elections ===
Election	Mayors & Magistrates	Councils	Third-level Municipal heads	Third-level Municipal councils	Fourth-level Village heads	Election Leader
2001-2002	1 / 23	49 / 897	4 / 319	—N/a	—N/a	James Soong Chu-yu
2002 municipalities only	0 / 2	15 / 96	—N/a	—N/a	—N/a	James Soong Chu-yu
2005	1 / 23	31 / 901	3 / 319	—N/a	—N/a	James Soong Chu-yu
2006 municipalities only	0 / 2	6 / 96	—N/a	—N/a	—N/a	James Soong Chu-yu
2009	0 / 17	1 / 587	0 / 211	—N/a	—N/a	James Soong Chu-yu
2010 municipalities only	0 / 5	4 / 314	—N/a	—N/a	0 / 3,757	James Soong Chu-yu
2014 unified	0 / 22	9 / 906	0 / 204	0 / 2,137	1 / 7,836	James Soong Chu-yu
2018 unified	0 / 22	8 / 912	0 / 204	0 / 2,148	1 / 7,744	James Soong Chu-yu
2022 unified	0 / 22	2 / 910	0 / 204	0 / 2,139	0 / 7,748	James Soong Chu-yu

=== National Assembly elections ===
Election	Total seats won	Total votes	Share of votes	Changes	Election leader	Status	President
2005	18 / 300	236,716	6.11%	▲18 seats	James Soong Chu-yu	4th Party	Chen Shui-bian

== See also ==
- Politics of the Republic of China
- Elections in Taiwan
- List of political parties in Taiwan
