= James Soong =

Taiwanese political scientist and politician (born 1942)

Soong Chu-yu
- 宋楚瑜
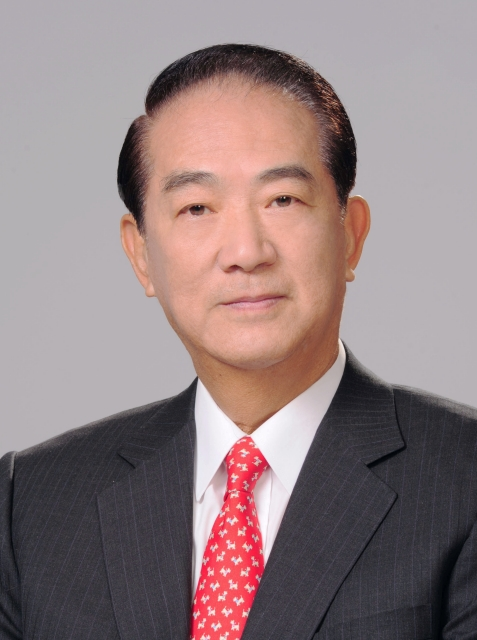
- Official portrait, 2016

1st Chairman of the People First Party
- Incumbent
- Assumed office 31 March 2000
- Deputy: Chang Chau-hsiung
- Preceded by: Position established

Senior Advisor to the President
- In office 9 November 2016 – 2 May 2019
- President: Tsai Ing-wen

1st Governor of Taiwan Province
- In office 20 December 1994 – 20 December 1998
- Deputy: Lin Fong-cheng; Lai In-jaw
- Preceded by: Position established (Note: Himself as Chairman of the Taiwan Provincial Government)
- Succeeded by: Position abolished
- 14th Chairman of the Provincial Government
- In office 20 March 1993 – 20 December 1994
- Appointed by: Executive Yuan
- Prime Minister: Lien Chan
- Preceded by: Lien Chan
- Succeeded by: Chao Shou-po

Minister of the Government Information Office
- In office 25 January 1979 – 24 August 1984
- Prime Minister: Sun Yun-suan
- Preceded by: Ting Mao-shih
- Succeeded by: Chang King-yuh

Personal details
- Born: 30 April 1942 (age 84) Xiangtan, Hunan, Republic of China
- Party: People First Party (2000–); Kuomintang (1981–1999); Independent (1999–2000)
- Spouse: Viola Chen (1968–2011)
- Education: National Chengchi University (LLB); University of California, Berkeley (MA); Catholic University of America (MS); Georgetown University (PhD)

Military service
- Branch/service: ROC Military Police
- Years of service: 1964–1966
- Rank: Second Lieutenant

Chinese name
- Chinese: 宋楚瑜
Transcriptions
Standard Mandarin
- Hanyu Pinyin: Sòng Chǔyú
- Wade–Giles: Sung^{4} Ch'u^{3}-yü^{2}
- IPA: [sʊ̂ŋ ʈʂʰù.y̌]
Southern Min
- Hokkien POJ: Sòng Chhó-jû
- Tâi-lô: Sòng Tshó-jû

Soong Chu-yu (Chinese: 宋楚瑜; pinyin: Sòng Chǔyú; born 30 April 1942), also known by his English name James Soong, is a Taiwanese political scientist and politician who is the founder and chairman of the People First Party. Soong was the first and only elected governor of Taiwan Province from 1994 and 1998, after which he became a perennial candidate in Taiwanese politics.

Born in China to a Kuomintang military family, Soong graduated from National Chengchi University and earned his doctorate from Georgetown University in political science in 1974. He began his political career as a secretary to Premier Chiang Ching-kuo and rose to prominence as director-general of the Government Information Office (GIO) from 1979 to 1984. Upon Chiang's death, Soong was instrumental in silencing conservatives in the KMT from blocking the ascendancy of Lee Teng-hui as KMT leader. From 1994 to 1998, he was the only elected governor of Taiwan Province.

After failing to gain the KMT nomination, Soong ran as an independent in the 2000 presidential election. Though he placed second, his candidacy split the pan-Blue vote between himself and the KMT candidate, Vice President Lien Chan, leading to the victory of DPP candidate Chen Shui-bian. In the 2004 presidential election, he ran as vice president on the ticket of Lien Chan; they narrowly lost to Chen Shui-bian. Soong ran again as a candidate in the 2012 presidential race, garnering 2.77% of popular support. Soong's third presidential campaign in 2016 formed a split ticket with Minkuotang chairwoman Hsu Hsin-ying and won 12.84% of the vote. His 2020 campaign with running mate Sandra Yu finished last, with 4.2% of the vote.

== Early life and education ==
Soong was born in China on April 30, 1942, in Xiangtan, Hunan, province. His father, Soong Ta, was a career military officer under Chiang Kai-shek who was an enlisted sailor who rose to the rank of major general in the National Revolutionary Army. Ta had left Hunan to join the Kuomintang army at age 14 and was a close aide to Chiang and his son, Chiang Ching-kuo.

Soong's mother and two younger sisters were Protestant Christians while his father was a Buddhist. He was his father's first son and his childhood was largely defined by the Chinese Civil War. After the Kuomintang (KMT) defeat in the Chinese Civil War, the family fled to Taiwan in 1949 during the Retreat of the government of the Republic of China. Soong then began his early schooling in Taipei, where classmates remembered him as a "taciturn boy who stayed out of most of the usual social activities" and was "buried in his books."

In 1964, Soong graduated first in his class from National Chengchi University with a Bachelor of Laws (LL.B.) degree specializing in diplomacy. He then went to complete graduate studies in the United States, where he earned a Master of Arts (M.A.) in political science from the University of California, Berkeley, in 1967, then a Master of Science (M.S.) in library and information science from the Catholic University of America in 1971. He remained in Washington, D.C., to study for his doctorate and earned his Ph.D. in political science from Georgetown University in 1974. His doctoral dissertation was titled, "An Elite Perspective On Developmental Crisis: China's Experiences in Inner Mongolia." During his time studying in the U.S., Soong acquired "a near-perfect command of English."

== Early career ==
As he was finishing his doctoral studies, Government Information Office (GIO) Director Fredrick Chien recommended Soong to be the English secretary of then-premier Chiang Ching-kuo. Soong served as secretary to the premier from 1974 to 1977 and with Chiang Ching-kuo's accession to the presidency, the personal secretary to the president from 1978 to 1981 and 1984 to 1989. Soong gained his public fame on December 16, 1978, when he addressed the nation following the decision of the administration of U.S. president Jimmy Carter to break ties with the ROC in order to switch ties to the People's Republic of China.

Soon afterwards, President Chiang promoted Soong to become the youngest director-general of the GIO, in which he served from 1979 to 1984.

=== Rise of Lee Teng-hui ===
Upon Chiang Ching-kuo's death in 1988, Soong was seen as instrumental in consolidating the power of the new president, Lee Teng-hui. Soong was part of the Palace Faction (宮廷派) that included Chiang loyalists such as Hau Pei-tsun and Lee Huan and which sought to limit Lee Teng-hui and his native Taiwanese faction's role in the government. During the KMT's central standing committee on the day of Chiang's funeral, when the Palace Faction sought to delay Lee's accession to the party chairmanship, Soong unexpectedly made an impassioned plea in favour of Lee, declaring that "Each day of delay is a day of disrespect to Ching-kuo." He also made a veiled criticism of Soong Mei-ling (no relation), implying that she had returned to Taiwan after her stepson's death to try to reassume power.

Soong established himself as one of the few mainlanders who were also loyal to Lee. In support of Soong, Lee coined the term "New Taiwanese" to describe a person born in mainland China, raised in Taiwan, who calls Taiwan home. Lee moved swiftly to promote Soong to KMT Secretary-General, a position Soong held from 1989 to 1993. In 1993, Lee appointed him Governor of Taiwan Province.

In June 1993, Soong opened a Credit Suisse account, three months after he had stepped down as KMT secretary-general, and it closed in 2010. In 2007 he held over 13 million Swiss francs in it, which is incompatible by his official salary as a public servant. The account is one of a number of things which have led to implications of his involvement in the Taiwan frigate scandal.

== Governor of Taiwan (1994–98) ==
In 1994 Soong was elected and became the only directly elected governor of Taiwan Province. He was widely perceived to be an excellent campaigner and his excellent showing in the governorship ended hopes by the DPP of a "Yeltsin effect", by which an elected governor would have more legitimacy than the national government, due to the president being still elected by the National Assembly at that time.

Despite his Waishengren background, Soong proved to be a popular politician among all ethnic groups on Taiwan, in part because he was one of the first KMT politicians to attempt to speak in Taiwanese Hokkien in political and formal occasions.

After Premier Lien Chan was elected vice-president in 1996, the premiership was vacated in 1997 after the Judicial Yuan ruled out that the person could not serve both vice-president and premier. Soong felt that as Governor of Taiwan, he was the natural successor to Lien, but President Lee believed that Soong should serve out his term. President Lee appointed Vincent Siew, whom Soong considered a subordinate, and this act led to the split between Soong and Lee.

The position of Governor of Taiwan was eliminated in December 1998 following a National Development Council meeting in 1996, when it suggested that the administrative structure of the Taiwanese government be streamlined. Soong and his supporters believe this to have been a political move by President Lee to cut off Soong's power base, but proponents of the downsizing called it a pragmatic move to eliminate administrative redundancies. Soong tendered his resignation on December 31 of the same year, but President Lee did not accept it.

== Perennial candidate (2000–present) ==
=== 2000 presidential election ===
After losing the KMT presidential nomination to then-vice president Lien Chan, Soong ran as an independent in the 2000 presidential election. Soong advocated a gradual union between Taiwan and the mainland by first signing a non-aggression pact followed by the formation of a cross-strait union similar to the European Union. His platform called for the characterization of relations between the mainland and Taiwan as neither foreign nor domestic. Although widely seen as the candidate most friendly to mainland China, Soong took particular effort to counter the perception that he would "sell out" Taiwan.

The KMT responded by expelling Soong and his supporters from the party. In the final months leading to the 2000 elections, the KMT, then under Lee Teng-hui's leadership, sued Soong for theft, alleging that as party secretary-general, he stole millions of Taiwan dollars in cash intended for the family of the late president Chiang Ching-kuo and hid the money in the Chunghsing Bills Finance Company. In defense he stated that the money in those bank accounts was in fact all from the KMT, and he insisted that the money transfer was authorized by then-KMT chairman Lee Teng-hui. These statements have been substantiated by an internal KMT memo signed by Lee which were published by the court many years later.

The scandal hurt Soong's clean image. Initially leading in the polls, Soong narrowly lost the election with 36.84% of the vote to Chen Shui-bian of the Democratic Progressive Party with 39.3%. Lien came in a distant third with only 23.1%.

After losing the election, Soong's supporters protested in front of the KMT party headquarters and blockaded the building for a few days. They succeeded in pressuring Lee Teng-hui to resign as KMT chairman in favor of Lien Chan. Within weeks, Soong and his supporters formed the People First Party (PFP), considered a spin-off from the KMT.

Prosecutors later dropped all charges against Soong in the Chunghsing scandal. In 2003, the investigation was reopened, with former president Lee (now expelled from the KMT and the "spiritual leader" of the pro-independence Taiwan Solidarity Union) testifying against Soong in court. However, with the KMT allied with the PFP for the 2004 presidential election, the KMT aided Soong in his defence, providing documents signed by Lee. KMT chairman Lien Chan claimed the KMT was misled into filing the lawsuit against Soong.

=== 2004 presidential election ===
Despite the personal rivalries between Lien, the KMT chairman after 2000, and Soong, the KMT and People First Party pledged to cooperate in future elections to prevent splitting the vote. Though losses in the 2001 legislative election made the DPP the largest single party in the Legislative Yuan, the pan-Blue Coalition retained a narrow majority over the pan-Green Coalition.

Soong ran as a vice presidential candidate under Lien Chan in the 2004 election. Some believe that the PFP's lack of experienced candidates in the December 2002 mayoral elections in Taipei and Kaohsiung (the PFP supported the KMT's candidates), and the PFP's poor performance the city council elections in those cities at the same time were major setbacks to Soong's chances of being the KMT-PFP candidate for president. There were widespread rumours that Soong agreed to take the vice-presidential post in exchange for a pledge by Lien to give him significant power, including the premiership. Many KMT members opposed the linkage, considering Soong an opportunist and traitor. Soong's supporters pointed out that he was more popular than Lien, as consistently demonstrated by polls and the results of the 2000 presidential elections. Though both men garnered a combined 60% of the vote in 2000 (compared to Chen's 39%), they lost to Chen in 2004 by a mere 0.22% of the vote and never conceded.

=== 2005 ===
After the 2004 presidential election, Soong actively sought the merger of the KMT and People First Party. However, he ceased doing so after the 2004 legislative election. Although the pan-blue coalition did well, the PFP did not, and Soong ended talk of a KMT-PFP merger. In February 2005, he signed a 10-point consensus program with President Chen Shui-bian, which brought heavy criticism to Chen. The possibility of DPP-PFP cooperation ended in May 2005, when Soong visited mainland China to meet with General Secretary Hu Jintao of the Chinese Communist Party. Initially, Chen stated that Soong would deliver a secret message to the PRC leadership, but Soong denied this.

In the 2005 KMT chairmanship election, Soong, who retained a significant following within the KMT, despite initially instructing party officials not to support either Ma Ying-jeou or Wang Jin-pyng, endorsed Wang at the last minute. However, the endorsement appeared to backfire as Ma defeated Wang by a large margin of 72% to 28%. On July 22, 2005, Soong, unopposed, was re-elected chairman of the PFP.

=== 2006 Taipei mayoral election ===
On October 18, 2006, Soong formally announced and registered his candidacy for the mayoralty of Taipei City, Taiwan's capital and largest city, in the local government elections to be held in December 2006. Soong registered as a "non-partisan" candidate without a party affiliation, declaring that he had taken a leave of absence from his post as chairman of the PFP.

After his defeat in the Taipei mayoral election on 9 December 2006, in which he won only 4% of cast ballots, James Soong announced that he would retire from politics, which entailed giving up the chairmanship of his party, the PFP. With this announcement and no clear goal, the PFP face an uncertain future, which could speed up any merger with the Kuomintang.

=== 2012 presidential election ===
After a petition, Soong, for the first time as a People First Party presidential candidate, ran the 2012 presidential election together with Lin Ruey-shiung, a National Taiwan University professor in public health. Soong described the "Blue-Green rivalry" in Taiwanese politics as an epidemic and stated that Lin, as a doctor, was his partner to cure this "disease". He contended that Taiwanese people wanted a third party other than the KMT and the DPP and that the PFP was their choice.

=== 2016 presidential election ===
Soong announced his intention to join the 2016 presidential election on 6 August 2015 with running mate Hsu Hsin-ying of the Minkuotang. The Soong–Hsu ticket finished third, with 12.8% of the vote.

=== 2020 presidential election ===
Soong contested the 2020 presidential election, beginning his campaign on 13 November 2019. He had promised that this campaign would be his last attempt for the presidency. Soong and Sandra Yu formed the People First Party ticket. The pair registered their candidacy with the Central Election Commission on 18 November 2019. Soong and Yu finished third in the presidential election, with 4.2% of the vote.

== Personal life ==
As a graduate student at Berkeley, Soong met his wife, Viola Chen (陳萬水), with whom he had a son and a daughter.

=== Awards and honors ===
Soong has been awarded multiple honorary degrees, including honorary doctorates by the Catholic University of America, the University of South Australia, the University of Maryland, and Sookmyung Women's University. He has also received multiple national decorations, including the Order of Good Hope (Grand Cross) in 1980 and the Order of Diplomatic Service Merit (Kwanghwa Medal) in 1982. He was awarded an Eisenhower Fellowship in the U.S. in 1982 and he was named an Ellsworth Bunker Distinguished Fellow in 1999 by the Asia Foundation.

== Notes ==
Political offices
Preceded by Lien Chan as Chairman of the Taiwan Provincial Government	Governor of Taiwan Province; 1993–1998	Succeeded by Chao Shou-po as Chairman of the Taiwan Provincial Government
Preceded by Ting Mao-shih	Head of the Government Information Office; 1979–1984	Succeeded by Chang King-yuh
Party political offices
New office	Chairman of the People First party 2000–present	Incumbent
