= List of political parties in Taiwan =

This article lists the political parties in the Republic of China (Taiwan) from 7 December 1949.

The organization of political parties in Taiwan is governed by the Political Parties Act, enacted on 6 December 2017. The Political Parties Act defines political parties as "political groups consisting of Republic of China (ROC) citizens with a common political ideology who safeguard the free, democratic, constitutional order, assist in shaping the political will of the people, and nominate candidates for election to public office."

Prior to the passage of the Political Parties Act, political organizations in Taiwan followed the Civil Associations Act, also known as the Civil Organizations Act, promulgated in 1989. The Civil Associations Act required that groups held a convention to announce the formation of a political party, and within thirty days of the announcement, provide a list of party members and a party charter to the Ministry of the Interior. Groups established when the Civil Associations Act was in effect should have revised their charters to comply with the Political Parties Act by 7 December 2019. To be compliant with the Political Parties Act, political groups must additionally convene a representative assembly or party congress for four consecutive years and have followed relevant laws and regulations governing the nomination of candidates to campaign in elections for public office for the same time period. Within one year of filing for political party status, a political group must complete legal person registration. The Ministry of the Interior requires that political parties submit annual property and financial statements. Political organizations that do not meet these regulations were dissolved and removed from the registry of political parties.

== Current parties ==
=== Parties with national or local representation ===
- National representation includes the President, the Vice President, and the 113 national legislator seats in the Legislative Yuan.
- Local representation includes the 22 mayors/magistrates executive positions and 912 local legislator (councils) seats of the 6 special municipalities, 3 cities and 13 counties.

| Alliance | Party | | Legislative Yuan | Local leaders | Local councillors | Party leader | Cross-strait position | Ideology | International affiliation |
|---|---|---|---|---|---|---|---|---|---|
| | DPP | Democratic Progressive Party (Note: In local languages: Traditional Chinese script: 民主進步黨; Mandarin Pinyin: Mínzhǔ Jìnbù Dǎng; Hokkien: Bîn-chú Chìn-pō͘ Tóng) | 51 / 113 | 5 / 22 | 277 / 910 | Lai Ching-te | Huadu; Status quo; Taiwanese statehood | Progressivism; Social liberalism; Taiwanese nationalism | LI |
| | NPP | New Power Party (Note: In local languages: Traditional Chinese script: 時代力量; Mandarin Pinyin: Shídài Lìliàng; Hokkien: Sî‑tāi Le̍k‑liōng) (Note: NPP is being disputed as a member of Pan-Green coalition, see DPP–NPP Relationship.) | 0 / 113 | 0 / 22 | 4 / 910 | Claire Wang | Taiwanese statehood | Progressivism; Taiwanese nationalism | —N/a |
| | TSU | Taiwan Solidarity Party (Note: In local languages: Traditional Chinese script: 台灣團結聯盟; Mandarin Pinyin: Táiwān Tuánjié Liánméng; Hokkien: Tâi-oân Thoân-kiat Liân-bêng) | 0 / 113 | 0 / 22 | 3 / 910 | Chou Ni-an | Taiwanese statehood | Economic nationalism; Taiwanese nationalism | —N/a |
| | SBP | Taiwan Statebuilding Party (Note: In local languages: Traditional Chinese script: 台灣基進; Mandarin Pinyin: Táiwān Jījìn; Hokkien: Tâi-oân Ki-chìn) | 0 / 113 | 0 / 22 | 2 / 910 | Wang Hsing-huan | Taiwanese statehood | Progressivism; Radicalism; Taiwanese nationalism | —N/a |
| | SDP | Social Democratic Party (Note: In local languages: Traditional Chinese script: 社會民主黨; Mandarin Pinyin: Shèhuì Mínzhǔ Dǎng; Hokkien: Siā-hōe Bîn-chú Tóng) | 0 / 113 | 0 / 22 | 1 / 910 | Hsu Yung | Taiwanese statehood | Social democracy; Progressivism | —N/a |
| Pan-Green coalition total | | | 51 / 113 | 5 / 22 | 290 / 910 | | | | |
| | KMT | Chinese Nationalist Party (Note: In local languages: Traditional Chinese script: 中國國民黨; Mandarin Pinyin: Zhōngguó Guómíndǎng; Hokkien: Tiong-kok Kok-bîn-tóng) (Kuomintang) | 54 / 113 (Note: Including 2 independent Yuan members joining the KMT Caucus) | 14 / 22 | 367 / 910 | Cheng Li-wun | Status quo; 1992 Consensus; Unification under ROC | Conservatism; Tridemism; ROC nationalism | IDU; CDI |
| | NPSU | Non-Partisan Solidarity Union (Note: In local languages: Traditional Chinese script: 無黨團結聯盟; Mandarin Pinyin: Wúdǎng Tuánjié Liánméng; Hokkien: Bû-tóng Thoân-kiat Liân-bêng) | 0 / 113 | 0 / 22 | 7 / 910 | Lin Pin-kuan | Status quo; 1992 Consensus; Unification under ROC | Third Way | —N/a |
| | PFP | People First Party (Note: In local languages: Traditional Chinese script: 親民黨; Mandarin Pinyin: Qīnmín Dǎng; Hokkien: Chhin-bîn Tóng) | 0 / 113 | 0 / 22 | 2 / 910 | James Soong | Status quo; 1992 Consensus; Unification under ROC | Liberal conservatism | —N/a |
| | NP | New Party (Note: In local languages: Traditional Chinese script: 新黨; Mandarin Pinyin: Xīn Dǎng; Hokkien: Sin Tóng) | 0 / 113 | 0 / 22 | 1 / 910 | Wu Cherng-dean | 1992 Consensus; One country, two systems (joint regime) | Conservatism; Chinese nationalism | —N/a |
| Pan-Blue coalition total | | | 54 / 113 | 14 / 22 | 377 / 910 | | | | |
| | TPP | Taiwan People's Party (Note: In local languages: Traditional Chinese script: 台灣民眾黨; Mandarin Pinyin: Táiwān Mínzhòng Dǎng; Hokkien: Tâi-oân Bîn-chiòng Tóng) | 8 / 113 | 2 / 22 | 16 / 910 | Huang Kuo-chang | Status quo | Social liberalism; Populism; Civic nationalism | —N/a |
| | LP | Labor Party (Note: In local languages: Traditional Chinese script: 勞動黨; Mandarin Pinyin: Láodòng Dǎng; Hokkien: Lô-tōng Tóng) | 0 / 113 | 0 / 22 | 1 / 910 | Wu Jung-yuan | One country, two systems under PRC | Socialism; Chinese nationalism | —N/a |
| | ZSM | Zheng Shen Min Party (Note: In local languages: Traditional Chinese script: 正神名黨; Mandarin Pinyin: Zhèng Shén Míng Dǎng; Hokkien: Chìng Sîn Bîng Tóng) | 0 / 113 | 0 / 22 | 1 / 910 | Hsu Jung-te | | Centrism | —N/a |

=== Parties with representation only in town councils and village administrations ===
| Party | Seats | | | Party leader | Ideology |
| Party | Township | | Village representatives | Party leader | Ideology |
| Party | Mayor | Representative | Village representatives | Party leader | Ideology |
|---|---|---|---|---|---|
| Chinese Unification Promotion Party | 0 | 0 | 2 | Chang An-lo | Chinese unification Chinese conservatism |
| People's Democratic Party | 0 | 0 | 2 | Lai Tsung-yu | Socialism; Environmentalism; Minority rights |

=== Parties with no representation ===
| Party | Party leader | Ideology |
|---|---|---|
| China Old Veterans Unification Party | Unclear | Veterans' interests |
| Chinese People's Party | Wang Zhongquan | Chinese unification Social democracy Anti-communism |
| For Public Good Party | Chen Po-kuang | Chinese unification Chinese conservatism |
| MiLinguall Party | Wen Hsiao | Multilingualism |
| Patriot Alliance Association | Chou Ching-chun | Chinese unification Chinese conservatism Socialism with Chinese characteristics |
| Peasant Party | Chang Ming Hsien | Taiwan independence |
| Taiwan Farmers' Party | Hsieh Yung-hui | Agrarianism; Centrism |
| Taiwan First Nations Party | Lin Kuang-yi | Indigenism; Taiwanese indigenous interests |
| The Motorists' Party of ROC | Bryan Dong | Motorists' interests Right-wing populism |
| People's Communist Party | Lin Te-wang | Socialism with Chinese characteristics Chinese unification |
| National Socialism Association | Joshua Yue Shu-ya | Neo-Nazism; Chiangism; Ultranationalism; Chinese unification |
| Young China Party | Lin Yishan | Chinese unification Chinese conservatism Three Principles of the People |

== Historical parties ==
=== Taiwan under Japanese rule ===
Political party movements in Taiwan started in the late 1910s after World War I, during the Taishō era (Taishō democracy). Taiwanese political movements at this time were to modify the discriminatory colonial laws established in earlier years, and to set up local autonomy systems like in Mainland Japan. The largest political movement at this time was the Petition Movement for the Establishment of a Taiwanese Parliament. At the same time, the International Communist Movement also influenced Taiwan, many Left-wing parties and organizations were also established.

Notable Taiwanese parties during this time are:

- Taiwan Dōkakai (Chinese: 臺灣同化會; Pe̍h-ōe-jī: Tâi-oân Tông-hòa-hōe, Japanese: Taiwan Dōkakai)
- New People Society (新民會; Sin-bîn-hōe; Shinminkai)
- Taiwanese Cultural Association (臺灣文化協會; Tâi-oân Bûn-hòa Hia̍p-hōe; Taiwan Bunka Kyōkai)
- Taiwanese Federation of Workers' Unions (臺灣工友總聯盟; Tâi-oân Kang-iú Chóng Liân-bêng; Taiwan Kōyū Sōrenmei)
- Taiwanese Peasants Union (臺灣農民組合; Tâi-oân Lông-bîn Cho͘-ha̍p; Taiwan Nōmin Kumiai)
- Taiwanese Communist Party (臺灣共產黨; Tâi-oân Kiōng-sán Tóng; Taiwan Kyōsan-tō)
- Taiwanese People's Party (臺灣民眾黨; Tâi-oân Bîn-chiòng Tóng; Taiwan Minshu-tō)
- Taiwan Local Autonomy Union (臺灣地方自治聯盟; Tâi-oân Tē-hng Chū-tī Liân-bêng; Taiwan Tihō-jiti Renmei)

At the same time, the political parties in Mainland Japan also affected Taiwan. Those who served as Governor-General of Taiwan were also members of the House of Peers of the Imperial Diet (帝国議会). Party affiliations of the Governor-Generals were:

- Rikken Seiyūkai (立憲政友会; Pe̍h-ōe-jī: Li̍p-hiàn Chèng-iú-hōe)
- Kenseikai (憲政会; Hiàn-chèng-hōe)
- Rikken Minseitō (立憲民政党; Li̍p-hiàn Bîn-chèng Tóng)

In the late 1930s, the Empire of Japan joined the Second World War. To prepare for the Pacific War, all political parties in Mainland Japan were merged by then-Prime Minister Fumimaro Konoe into a single organization

- Imperial Rule Assistance Association (大政翼贊會, Taisei Yokusankai; Pe̍h-ōe-jī: Tāi-chèng-i̍k-chàn-hōe)

with its Taiwanese branch

- Imperial Subject Public Service Association (皇民奉公會; Pe̍h-ōe-jī: Hông-bîn Hōng-kong-hōe)

was the only legal political party-like organization in Taiwan until the end of World War II.

=== Taiwan under the Republic of China ===
The Republic of China effected its retrocession of Taiwan on 25 October 1945. From 1945 until 1949, political parties in China which had operated covertly under Japanese rule were permitted to operate in Taiwan. The ruling Kuomintang set up formal branches in Taiwan, and so did other major political parties including the Chinese Communist Party (in 1946). Although it had no formal connection with the Taiwanese Communist Party suppressed by Japanese authorities in the 1930s (which was instead affiliated with the Communist Party of Japan), the Taiwan branch of the Chinese Communist Party absorbed many former members of the Taiwanese Communist Party. However, against the backdrop of the Chinese Civil War which erupted soon after the retrocession of Taiwan, the Kuomintang-controlled Republic of China government attempted to restrict the operation of Chinese Communist Party cells in Taiwan, and other opposition parties.

With the Republic of China government rapidly losing the Chinese Civil War against the Chinese Communist Party, the ruling Kuomintang began preparing to move the government to Taiwan in 1949. Taiwan was placed under martial law from 19 May 1949 to 15 July 1987. The Taiwan provincial branch of the Chinese Communist Party was particularly targeted, and by 1952 had been completely destroyed.

During this time, all forms of opposition were forbidden by the government, and only three political parties that retreated to Taiwan were allowed to participate the elections.

- Kuomintang (Chinese: 中國國民黨; pinyin: Zhōngguó Guómíndǎng; Pe̍h-ōe-jī: Tiong-kok Kok-bîn-tóng) (Note: KMT's prior body was Revive China Society (興中會; xīngzhōnghuì), founded on 24 November 1894. It officially renamed itself as China Nationalist Party (中國國民黨) in 1919.)
- Chinese Youth Party (中國青年黨; Zhōngguó Qīngniándǎng; Tiong-kok Chheng-liân-tóng)
- China Democratic Socialist Party (中國民主社會黨; Zhōngguó Mínzhǔ Shèhuìdǎng; Tiong-kok Bîn-chú Siā-hoē-tóng) (Note: The prior body of China Democratic Socialist Party (中國民主社會黨) was China National Socialist Party (中國國家社會黨), which was founded on 16 April 1932. It renamed itself as China Democratic Socialist Party (中國民主社會黨) on 15 August 1946.)

All other oppositions who were not allowed not form a political party could only be listed as "independent candidate". These movements were called Tangwai movement (黨外, literally outside of Kuomintang). A notable exception in this era was

- Democratic Progressive Party (民主進步黨; Mínzhǔ Jìnbù Dǎng; Bîn-chú Chìn-pō͘ Tóng).

It was established "illegally" on 28 September 1986, then was legalized in the next year by the lifting of the martial law.

As Taiwan democratized in the late 1980s, the number of legally registered political parties in Taiwan had increased exponentially and continued to increase year by year, indicating a liberal democracy and high political freedom in Taiwan.

Number of registered political parties by year
| Year | 1990 | 1992 | 1994 | 1996 | 1998 | 2000 | 2002 | 2004 | 2006 | 2008 | 2010 | 2012 | 2014 | 2016 | 2017 | 2018 |
| No. parties | 60 | 72 | 75 | 82 | 87 | 94 | 99 | 110 | 122 | 145 | 177 | 234 | 264 | 310 | 334 | 220 |

In recent decades, Taiwan's political campaigns can be classified to two ideological blocs

- The Pan-Green Coalition, led by Democratic Progressive Party, favors Taiwanization and the Taiwan independence movement, eventually aiming to establish a Taiwanese sovereign state.
- The Pan-Blue Coalition, led by Kuomintang, is in favor of building closer ties with mainland China and the eventual Chinese unification under the Government of the Republic of China.

The majority in both coalitions state a desire to maintain the status quo for now. Many minor parties in Taiwan are unaligned with either coalition.

On 6 December 2017, the Political Parties Act (政黨法) was enforced. The Act requires the political parties to maintain a number of compliance, including

- File a declaration to the Ministry of the Interior, AND register as a legal person to a District Court,
- Convene representative assembly or party congress at least once in a four-year period,
- Nominate candidates in national or local elections at least once in a four-year period, and
- Compliance on funding source, accounting, and financial transparency.

By the end of 2018, among the 343 existing political party declarations: 220 have met the new compliance, 56 chose to dissolve or transformed to a national political association.

== See also ==
- Conservatism in Taiwan
- Progressivism in Taiwan
- February 28 Incident
- History of Taiwan
- Economic history of Taiwan
- Politics of the Republic of China
- Political parties of the Empire of Japan
- History of political parties in China
- List of political parties by country
- List of rulers of Taiwan
- Elections in Taiwan
