= List of Taiwanese flags =

Taiwan has been controlled by various governments and has been associated with various flags throughout its history. Since 1945, Taiwan has been governed by the Republic of China (ROC), and since 1949, it has served as the ROC's principal territorial base. Accordingly, the flag most commonly associated with Taiwan today is the Flag of the Republic of China.

The first national flag of Taiwan was first used in 1663 during the Kingdom of Tungning, which had a plain white flag with the character 鄭 (zhèng) on the red bordered circle. The flag of the Qing dynasty was also used from 1862 until 1895, when the Republic of Formosa was declared. The Formosan flag had a tiger on a plain blue field with azure clouds below it.

During Japanese rule from 1895 to 1945, Taiwan was governed as part of the Japanese Empire, and the national flag of Japan was used by the colonial administration.

Following the transfer of the control of Taiwan from Japan to China in 1945, the national flag was specified in Article Six of the 1947 Constitution of the Republic of China. After the Chinese Civil War in 1949, the government of Chiang Kai-shek relocated the Republic of China (ROC) to the island of Taiwan.

== Current flag ==
Flag	Duration	Use	Description
	1945–Present	Flag of the Republic of China	A red field, with a blue canton containing a 12-ray white sun.

== Historical flags ==
Flag	Duration	Use	Description
	1624–1662	Flag of Dutch Formosa	Same as the Flag of the Dutch East India Company
	1626–1642	Flag of Spanish Formosa	Same as the Flag of the Spanish Empire
	1661–1683	Flag of the Kingdom of Tungning	The Han character "鄭" (zheng) in a red circle outline on a plain white field.
	1890–1895	Flag of the Qing Dynasty	Azure Dragon on a plain yellow field with the red sun of the three-legged crow in the upper left corner.
	1895	Flag of the Republic of Formosa	Tiger on a plain blue field with azure clouds below it.
	1895–1945	Flag of Japan for use in Taiwan	White field with red disc in the centre.

== Royal flags ==
Flag	Duration	Use	Description
	1626–1642	Royal Flag of the House of Habsburg in Spain. (Inescutcheon of Portugal in the Royal arms)	
	1863–1895	Standard of the Qing Emperor	Azure Dragon on a plain right triangle yellow field with the red sun of the three-legged crow in the upper left corner.
	1895-1945	Imperial Standard of the Japanese Empire	Red field with the golden 16-petal chrysantemum in the centre.

== Political divisions ==
Below are the flags used in the political divisions of Taiwan.

=== Provinces ===
Flag	Duration	Use	Description
	1945-2018	Taiwan Province	A bright yellow background with a light blue circular seal with a map of Taiwan the same color of the background & the Republic of China (Taiwan)'s flag in the center with the nation's nation flowers, the plum blossoms, and a black ring surrounding it. There is red text on the bottom that says "Taiwan Provincial Government" in Traditional Chinese.

=== Special municipalities ===
Flag	Duration	Use	Description
	2009–Present	Kaohsiung City 高雄市	Stylized "高". Colors symbolizing sunshine, vitality, environmental protection, & ocean.
	2009–Present	New Taipei City 新北市	Highly stylized "北" in the form of four hearts arranged to resemble a four-leaf clover.
	2009–Present	Tainan City	
	2025-Present	Taichung City	Mid-Lake Pavilion of Taichung Park on the middle. "TAICHUNG" and "臺中" on the bottom.
	2009–Present	Taipei City	
	2014–Present	Taoyuan City	

=== Provincial cities ===
Flag	Duration	Use	Description
		Chiayi City	
		Keelung City	

=== Counties ===
Flag	Duration	Use	Description
		Changhua County	
		Chiayi County	
		Hsinchu County	
		Hualien County	
		Kinmen County	
		Lienchiang County	
		Miaoli County	
		Nantou County	
		Penghu County	
		Pingtung County	
		Taitung County	
		Yilan County	
		Yunlin County	

== Military flags ==
Flag	Duration	Use	Description
	1945– present	Flag of the Republic of China Army (formerly National Revolutionary Army)	The Blue Sky with a White Sun with a red border.
		Republic of China Navy	Identical to the Kuomintang flag (see below).
		Republic of China Air Force	
		Republic of China Marine Corps	
		Republic of China Military Police	
		Armed Forces	
		Armed Forces Reserve	
		Republic of China Military Academy	
		Combined Logistics Command	
		ROCA General's Flag	
		Coast Guard Administration	
		Chairman of the ROC Military Affairs Commission	
		National Defense University	

== Transport flags ==
Flag	Duration	Use	Description
	?-Present	Flag of Taiwan Area National Freeway Bureau	
	?-2018	Flag of Taiwan Area National Expressway Engineering Bureau	
	?-2023	Flag of Taiwan Railways Administration	
	2024-Present	Flag of Taiwan Railways Coporation	

== Other state flags ==
Flag	Duration	Use	Description
	1929–	Commander-in-chief flag of the Republic of China, also known as standard of the president of the Republic of China	
	1930–	Standard of the vice president of the Republic of China (abolished)	
	1947–1986	Standard of the vice president of the Republic of China	Abolished with Act of Ensign of the Republic of China Navy (海軍旗章條例) on Jan. 3rd, 1986.
	1929–1966	Civil ensign of the Republic of China	Four serrated yellow stripes are added to the flag of the Republic of China for use as a civil ensign at sea. Present civil ensign is national flag.

== Political party flags ==
Flag	Duration	Use	Description
	19th–20th century	Yellow Sand Society flag	
	1894–	Kuomintang flag (shared as the Naval Jack of the nation)	The "Blue Sky with a White Sun", 12 rays of the sun represent progressive ideals.
	1911–?	Royalist Party flag	
	1921–1949	Chinese Communist Party flag	
	1923-	Young China Party flag	
	1925–1946	Inner Mongolian People's Revolutionary Party flag	
	1927–?	Guangdong Peasants' Association flag	
	1927–1931	Taiwanese People's Party flag	
	1933–1934	Productive People's Party flag	
	1946–2020	China Democratic Socialist Party flag	
	1952–	China Youth Corps flag	
	1970–	World United Formosans for Independence flag	
	1986–	Democratic Progressive Party flag	
	1989–	Labor Party (Taiwan) flag	
	1993-	New Party (Taiwan) flag	
	1994–2020	Taiwan Communist Party flag	
	1996–2020	Taiwan Independence Party flag	
	2000–	People First Party flag	
	2006–	Hakka Party flag	
	2007–2019	Home Party flag	
	2009–2020	Taiwan Democratic Communist Party flag	
	2010s–	Patriot Alliance Association flag	
	2015–2019	Minkuotang flag	
	2017–	Taiwan People's Communist Party flag	
	2018–2020	Congress Party Alliance flag	

== Chinese Taipei sports flags ==
Flag	Duration	Use	Description
	1981–1986	Chinese Taipei Olympic flag.	The ROC is recognized as "Chinese Taipei" in the Olympics, due to the political status of Taiwan.
	1986–2010	Chinese Taipei Olympic flag.	The ROC is recognized as "Chinese Taipei" in the Olympics, due to the political status of Taiwan.
	2010–	Chinese Taipei Olympic flag.	The ROC is recognized as "Chinese Taipei" in the Olympics, due to the political status of Taiwan.
	1994-2004	Chinese Taipei Paralympic flag	
	2004-2019	Chinese Taipei Paralympic flag	
	2019–Present	Chinese Taipei Paralympic flag	
	1997-2019	Chinese Taipei Deaflympics flag	
	2019–Present	Chinese Taipei Deaflympics flag	
	2014–Present	Chinese Taipei Volleyball Association flag	
	Pre-2006	Chinese Taipei football flag	
	2006-2012	Chinese Taipei football flag	The Chinese Taipei Olympic flag replaced this flag as the football flag in 2012
	2012–Present	Chinese Taipei football flag	
	2009–Present	Chinese Taipei Universiade flag	
	2013–Present	Chinese Taipei WorldSkills flag	
	2019–Present	Chinese Taipei FIRST Robotics Competition flag	
	2016–Present	Chinese Taipei electronic sports flag used in Blizzard competitions.	

== Other historical flags ==
Flag	Duration	Use	Description
	1981–2010	Flag of Taipei City	Previous flag used by Taipei City, with its seal on top of 16 horizontal stripes of white and blue.
	1999-2006	Old flag of New Taipei City	
	1980s-1999	Old flag of New Taipei City	
	2006-2010	Old flag of New Taipei City	
	?-2010; 2018-2019	Old flag of Hsinchu County	
	2010-2018	Old flag of Hsinchu County	
	1945-2025	Old flag of Taichung City	A red text "臺中市" (Taichung City) on the middle of yellow background.
	1951-2010	Old flag of Taichung County	
	1978-2010	Old flag of Tainan City	
	?-2010	Old flag of Tainan County	
	1974-2009	Old flag of Kaohsiung City	
	?-1999	Old flag of Kaohsiung County	
	1999-2010	Old flag of Kaohsiung County	
	1984-2014	Old flag of Taitung County	

== Ethnic groups flags ==
=== Indigenous ===
Flag	Duration	Use	Description
	2018–present	Flag of Tao people	A white flag with the traditional "boat's eye" symbol and traditional triangular ornaments on the top and bottom.
	2017–present	Flag of Rukai people	The "Lily Flag" composed of three colors: red, yellow and green, representing hope, love and peace. The lilies and eagle feathers represent the purity and fairness of the Rukai tribe, was designed by Jin Shaohua.
	2017–present	Flag of Taiwanese indigenous peoples in Taichung	
	2016–present	"National flag" of Amis people in the Amis Music Festival.	
	?–present	Flag of Amis people in Taidong (Falangaw tribe^{zh})	
	1984–1998	Flag of Taiwan Association for the Promotion of Aboriginal Rights^{zh}	

== See also ==
- List of Chinese flags
- Proposed flags of Taiwan
