= Taiwanese Communist Party (disambiguation) =

The Taiwanese Communist Party (1928–1931) was a political party active in Taiwan during Japanese rule. It may also refer to the:

- Taiwan Communist Party (1994–2020), a social democratic party
- Taiwan Democratic Communist Party (2009–2020)
- Taiwan People's Communist Party
- Communist Party of the Republic of China (2009–2018)
- International Socialist Forward, a Trotskyist organisation
