= 2005 Taiwanese National Assembly election =

- 14 May 2005

All 300 seats in the ad hoc National Assembly 151 seats needed for a majority
- Registered: 16,750,867
- Turnout: 23.36%
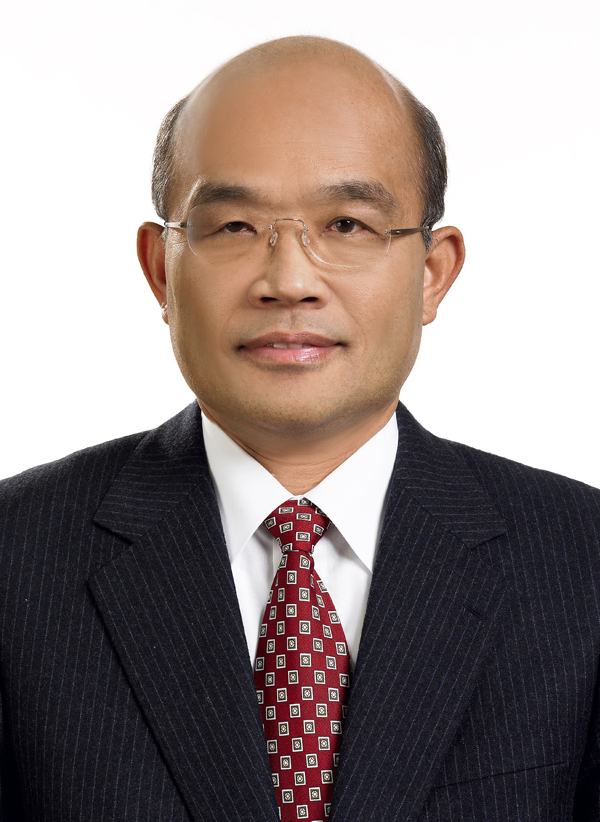

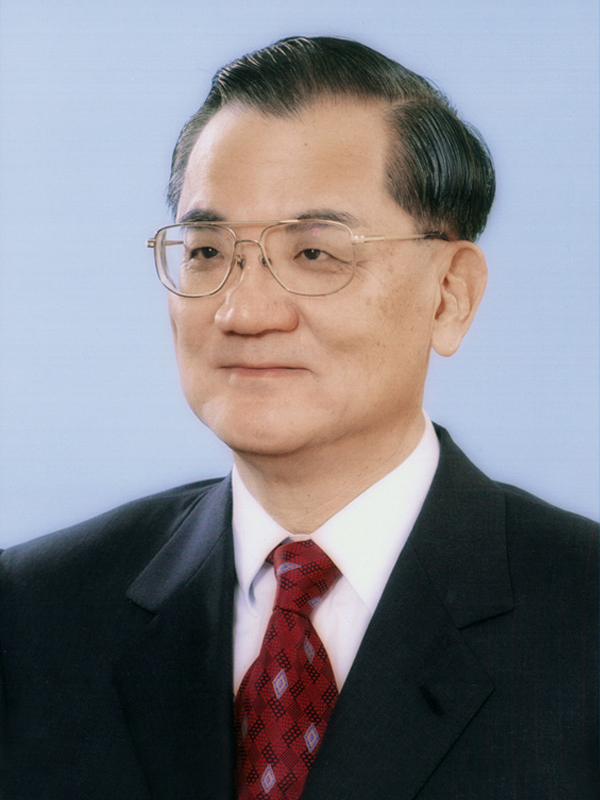

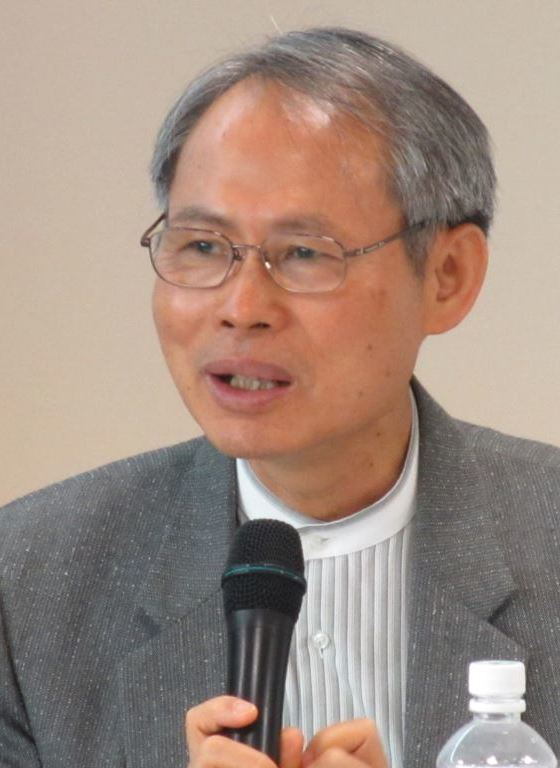

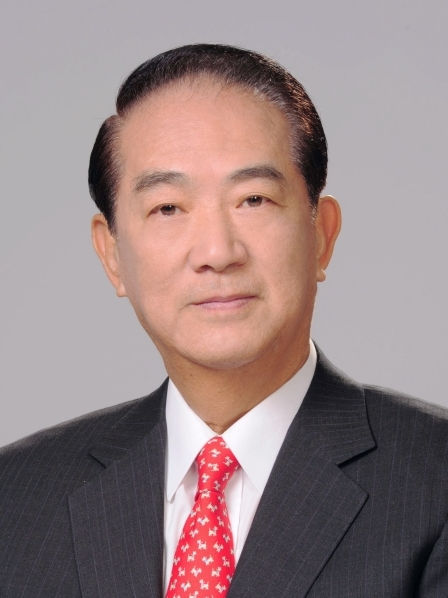
	First party	Second party
Leader	Su Tseng-chang	Lien Chan
Party	DPP	KMT
Leader since	15 February 2005	24 March 2000
Seats won	127	117
Popular vote	1,647,791	1,508,384
Percentage	42.52%	38.92%
Position	Pro-amendment	Pro-amendment
	Third party	Fourth party
Leader	Shu Chin-chiang	James Soong
Party	TSU	People First
Leader since	10 January 2005	31 March 2000
Seats won	21	18
Popular vote	273,147	236,716
Percentage	7.05%	6.11%
Position	Anti-amendment	Anti-amendment
- Vote lead by party position by township/city and district

An election for the National Assembly took place in Taiwan on Saturday, 14 May 2005, from 07:30 to 16:00 local time. It elected an ad hoc National Assembly whose only function was to serve as a constituent assembly in order to approve or reject amendments to the Constitution of the Republic of China already proposed by the Legislative Yuan. The results indicated that the amendments would be approved, as the parties supporting them won an overwhelming majority, and indeed the amendments were passed on 7 June 2005.

The election was carried out using purely the party-list proportional representation system. The official campaign period was 07:00 to 22:00 each day from 4 May 2005 to 13 May 2005. Official election broadcasts by the ad hoc coalitions (officially termed 'unions') and (established) parties were provided by the Public Television Service Taiwan on 7 May 2005; several unofficial debates were also arranged. Notably, this election saw the temporary breakdown of the traditional two-coalition system in Taiwanese politics: instead of dividing into the Pan-Green Coalition and Pan-Blue Coalition over the political status of Taiwan, the parties divided themselves into larger and smaller parties, with the larger Democratic Progressive Party and Kuomintang in support of the amendments and the smaller People First Party and Taiwan Solidarity Union against them.

== Background ==
This election initially generated little interest, as it was largely a procedural formality to elect a new National Assembly whose sole purpose would be to deal with the amendments, which were passed almost unanimously by the Legislative Yuan in August 2004. However, the unexpected pan-blue coalition victory in the December 2004 legislative election considerably changed the electoral landscape.

Originally, the Taiwan Solidarity Union supported the constitutional amendments on the belief that they would be a prelude to a more thorough move toward Taiwan independence. The Constitutional amendments were part of a package originally promoted by the Democratic Progressive Party, but were passed almost unanimously after compromises were made on the wording. However, after the December elections, which returned a pan-blue majority opposed to a rapid move toward independence, the TSU reconsidered its support, and has announced its opposition to the amendments.

Similarly, the People First Party changed its position. Most analysts believe that PFP leader James Soong had initially planned to have a major role in a reformed KMT which would consist of a merger of the KMT and PFP. However, the PFP performed poorly in the December elections, and after the elections Soong ended any talk of a merger and began an effort to improve relations with the DPP. The reconsideration of support is widely believed to be because the reforms would hurt small parties such as the PFP.

Following the visit by Kuomintang leader Lien Chan to mainland China and a similar trip by PFP leader James Soong, the election has been unexpectedly turned into a referendum on pan-blue and pan-green plans for relations with China. During the week before the election, President Chen Shui-bian gave a television interview in which he argued that a vote against the constitutional amendments would play into the hands of the PRC and that the amendments marked a step toward legal Taiwan independence. However, these arguments have were widely criticized in Taiwan, since the Kuomintang, which is anti-Taiwan independence strongly supported the amendments, while the pro-independence Taiwan Solidarity Union strongly opposed them.

== Constitutional amendments ==
The proposed amendments may be summarized as follows:

1. Reducing the number of members in the Legislative Yuan from 225 to 113;
2. Changing the term of office for Legislative Yuan members from 3 years to 4 years to synchronize the election cycle with the President of the Republic of China;
3. Changing the electoral system for the Legislative Yuan to first-past-the-post system with single member constituency, along with a separate party-list top-up (Additional Member System);
4. Abolishing the National Assembly in favour of referendums for the ratification of constitutional amendments and territorial changes (proposed by a three-fourths vote of the Legislative Yuan) in the future; and
5. Changing the impeachment procedure for the president and vice-president so they are dealt with by the Grand Justices.

Using referendums to ratify constitutional amendments has been portrayed by some as a step toward Taiwan independence. However, the requirement that such a referendum must first be approved by a three-fourths vote of the Legislative Yuan, and that at least 50% of the whole electorate had to vote for the change for the referendum to succeed considerably reduced the chance that these amendments would trigger a conflict with the People's Republic of China.

== Parties and campaign ==
The 300 seats in the National Assembly were up for election. The follow parties fielded candidates on their party lists:

- Taiwan Solidarity Union (TSU): 50 candidates on its party list
- Taiwan Independence Party 22
- Non-Partisan Solidarity Union 30
- People First Party (PFP) 83
- New Party 26
- Democratic Progressive Party (DPP) 150
- Kuomintang (KMT) 147.
- Democratic Action Alliance led by Chang Ya-chung (ad hoc electoral coalition): 150
- 20 persons union led by Wang Ting-hsing (ad hoc electoral coalition): 20
- Peasant Party and Civil Party: 3 each
- Chinese People's Party: 4

Each party or coalition, by law, had to register and announce whether it supported or disapproved of the proposed amendment; this was announced in the short gazette that was distributed along with the poll card. Since this assertion was binding on the members elected, the election was de facto a referendum on the proposed amendments. Only the Kuomintang, the governing DPP, and the three minor party registered their support for the amendments; the others have announced objection. Notably, the political tendencies dubbed pan-green and pan-blue coalitions were each split down the middle in their opinions on the proposed amendments, with the dominant partner in each coalition supporting the amendments, probably because the proposed electoral system would benefit large parties.

Each individual in the electorate voted for one from the 10 parties and 2 coalitions. The seats were distributed amongst the parties and coalitions based on the total number of votes garnered by each. There was to be at least 1 female member guaranteed for every 4 elected in each party/coalition; and 1 aboriginal member guaranteed for every 30 in each party/coalition.

The elections themselves generated very little interest in Taiwan, which accounted for the record-low turnout. Polls indicated that most Taiwanese did not plan to vote and had little interest in or knowledge of what the election is about. In addition, most parties did not spend very much in campaign funds. Terrible weather in the north of Taiwan on election day also affected the turnout.

== Results ==
The official results showed that the turnout was only 23.36%, a record low despite the Central Election Commission holding an official raffle for those who turned out to vote. The parties supporting the amendments won 249 out of a total of 300 seats, compared to the opposition's 51 seats, which was enough to ensure that the constitutional amendments were passed by the elected National Assembly. Though this election was not campaigned along the coalition tendencies, some analysts are inclined to see it as a forerunner for the upcoming elections such as the county-level gubernatorial, mayoral, and council elections that may take place later in the year. Tallying along those lines, Pan-Green Coalition has won 49.6% of the vote and 149 seats out of the 300, with strength in southern Taiwan; the Pan-Blue Coalition garnered 45.9% with 138 seats, strongest in the north.

Party	Votes	%	Seats
Democratic Progressive Party	1,647,791	42.52	127
Kuomintang	1,508,384	38.92	117
Chinese People's Party	41,940	1.08	3
Peasant Party	15,516	0.40	1
Civil Party	8,609	0.22	1
Parties in favour of the amendments	3,222,240	83.14	249
Taiwan Solidarity Union	273,147	7.05	21
People First Party	236,716	6.11	18
150 persons union (Democratic Action Alliance)	65,081	1.68	5
New Party	34,253	0.88	3
Non-Partisan Solidarity Union	25,162	0.65	2
Taiwan Independence Party	11,500	0.30	1
20 persons union	7,499	0.19	1
Parties against the amendments	653,358	16.86	51
Total	3,875,598	100.00	300
Valid votes	3,875,598	99.04	
Invalid/blank votes	37,740	0.96	
Total votes	3,913,338	100.00	
Registered voters/turnout	16,750,867	23.36	

== Aftermath ==
The only authority of the National Assembly was to accept or reject amendments which were proposed almost unanimously by the Legislative Yuan in August 2004, one of which was to abolish the National Assembly.

One question which was unresolved until after the elections was the threshold for passage of the amendments. The DPP and KMT had advocated a majority vote for passage, while the smaller parties advocated a three-fourths threshold. It wasn't until the week after the election that the Legislature agreed on the three-quarters voting threshold - when it was already clear that the parties which supported the amendments controlled more than 75% of the National Assembly. Also, the TSU has advocated voting on the amendments separately, which was impossible as the inter-party agreement for these amendments stipulated that they be adopted all or none.

The proposed system of electing Legislative Yuan members was considered unfavourable to smaller parties, but was originally supported by the two smaller parties in Taiwan for different reasons.

7 June 2005 vote on the 7th constitutional amendment
	Count	%	% members
Members	300	100.00	
Minimum votes	225	75.00	
Agree votes	249	83.84	83.00
Disagree votes	48	16.16	16.00
Valid votes	297	99.66	99.00
Invalid votes	1	0.34	0.33
Total votes	298	100.00	99.33
Outcome	Adopted		
