= Peasant Party (Taiwan) =

Peasant Party 農民黨 Nóngmíndǎng (Mandarin) Nùng-mìn Tóng (Hakka)
- Leader: Chang Ming Hsien (張銘顯)
- Founded: February 3, 1989
- Headquarters: Taipei, Taiwan
- Ideology: Taiwan Independence

The Peasant Party (Chinese: 農民黨; pinyin: Nóngmíndǎng; Pe̍h-ōe-jī: Lông‑bîn-tóng) is a minor party in the Republic of China (Taiwan). It was established on 3 February 1989, but only came into the political horizon when its founder Tiuⁿ Bêng-hián (張銘顯) was elected in the 2005 National Assembly election. Tiuⁿ claimed that the party has more than 6,000 members. On the national question, it leans towards Taiwan independence.

== Policy stance ==
The Peasant Party regards the two belligerent parties of the Chinese Civil War (the People's Republic of China versus the Republic of China; or the Chinese Communist Party versus the Kuomintang) should recognize each other as sovereign States, similar to the model adopted by the Federal Republic of Germany and the German Democratic Republic. It predicts that the two parties will reunite when the economic conditions become similar. However, the Peasant Party does not consider the islands of Taiwan and the Pescadores part of China, because they consider the Republic of Formosa of 1895 recovers de jure sovereignty over these islands, after the surrender of Japan following World War 2. This led them to assert that the current sovereign territory of the Republic of China only covers Quemoy and Matsu (both historically and administratively part of Fujian).

It regards 'the Taiwanese people' to be all who were born in Taiwan ('jus soli'). It considers Taiwan to be (almost) terra nullius, but acknowledges that several states have exercised sovereignty over Taiwan, seemingly in an attempt to counter any claim of sovereignty by arguments of jus sanguinis.

Economically, the party believes that the government should protect the basic income of the farmers (peasants); that Taiwan's membership of the World Trade Organization is not an excuse to give up agriculture, allowing a flood of imported agricultural produce.

It supports a constitutional basis for ecological principles, and that constitutional reform should be 'internationalized'.

The Peasant Party has been sending groups to pay tribute to the Yasukuni Shrine in Japan, to pay tributes to the 30,308 Taiwanese soldiers drafted during the Japanese rule over Taiwan.

In June 2005, the Peasant Party joined the staunchly independence-leaning Taiwan Defense Alliance.

== Electoral history ==
The Peasant Party had campaigned unsuccessfully in Chiayi County and Changhua County during legislative and National Assembly elections. It broke this pattern for the first time in the 2005 National Assembly election when its leader won a seat with 15,516 votes (0.4%) under the party-list proportional representation system.

== See also ==
- Elections in Taiwan
- List of political parties in Taiwan
