= Chou Ching-chun =

Taiwanese social activist and politician (1943–2021)

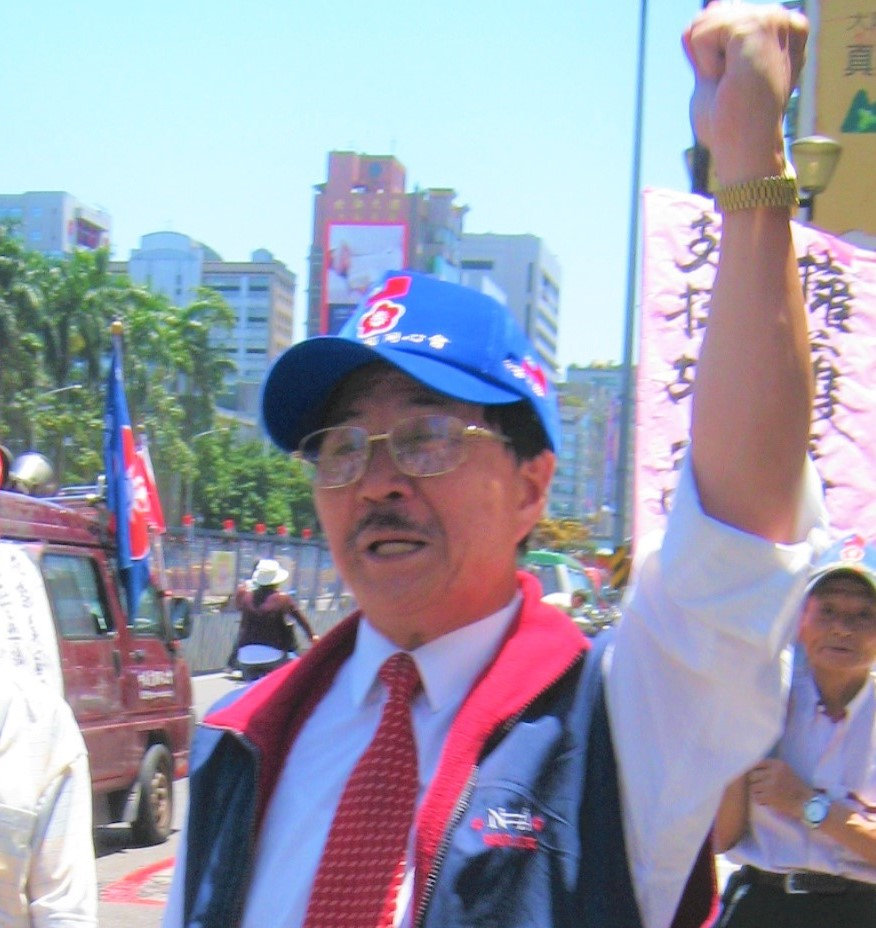
- Born: 28 June 1943; Taipei, Taiwan
- Died: 16 June 2021 (aged 77); Taipei, Taiwan
- Political party: Patriot Alliance Association

Chou Ching-chun (simplified Chinese: 周庆峻; traditional Chinese: 周慶峻) was a Taiwanese politician and Chinese nationalist who was president of the Patriot Alliance Association.

== Biography ==
Chou Ching-chun was born in 1943 in Haifeng County, Guangdong Province of a large family. He and his family was suppressed after the Chinese Communist Revolution, and he escaped to Hong Kong, then a British colony, by stowaway between 1961 and 1962. He moved to Taiwan after the Sino-British Joint Declaration because of his antipathy towards communism. He also held Taiwanese citizenship after 1949. He ran for a legislative seat in 1995 campaigning on an anti-communist Chinese unification platform, but became publicly pro-Chinese Communist Party after his crushing defeat.

Chou was president of the Patriot Alliance Association.

Chou died at the Taipei City Hospital Zhongxing Branch on 16 June 2021, aged 77, from COVID-19. His wife Lin Ming-mei was charged with violations of the Anti-Infiltration Act in July 2022, following an investigation into the PAA led by the Taipei District Prosecutors' Office. Prosecutors stated that Chou would not be posthumously indicted.
