= Communist Party of the Republic of China =

Political party in Taiwan that existed from 2009 to 2018

- Chairman: Lu Yubao
- General Secretary: Chen Tianfu (until 25 September 2009)
- Founded: 31 March 2009
- Dissolved: 23 May 2018
- Ideology: Chinese communism Chinese unification
- National affiliation: Pro-Beijing camp

The Communist Party of the Republic of China (Chinese: 中華民國共產黨; pinyin: Zhōnghuá Mínguó Gòngchǎndǎng) was a political party in the Republic of China (Taiwan). It was officially registered on 31 March 2009 by the Ministry of the Interior, making it the 147th registered political party in the country and the second legally named "communist party" in Taiwan after the Taiwan Communist Party.

The party's inaugural meeting was held at the Chung-Shan Building in the Yangmingshan National Park in October 2008 and is led by Lu Yubao as the party's chairman and Chen Tianfu as the General Secretary. The party supported the platform of the Chinese Communist Party and Chinese unification.

The party was dissolved by the Ministry of Interior on 23 May 2018.

== See also ==
- Taiwan Democratic Communist Party
