= Chinese People's Party =

Chinese People's Party Chinese: 中國民眾黨; pinyin: Zhōngguó Mínzhòng Dǎng
- Leader: Wang Zhongquan
- Ideology: Chinese unification Social democracy Democratic socialism Anti-communism
- Political position: Left-wing

The Chinese People's Party (Chinese: 中國民眾黨; pinyin: Zhōngguó Mínzhòng Dǎng) is a small political party in the Republic of China that was established by Wang Zhongquan (Chinese: 王忠泉) in 1987. It won three seats in the National Assembly election of 2005. It combines the Pan-Blue Coalition and Pan-Green Coalition platforms, upholding the Three Principles of the People while simultaneously aiming for Chinese unification.

== Party Objectives ==
The CPP supports Chinese nationalism, socialism, anti-bureaucracy, anti-privilege, anti-dictatorship, anti-corruption, justice for all, world unity, and democratic constitutional government. advocates strengthening substantive exchanges with Mainland China, supports the Three Principles of the People, and Chinese unification.

== Electoral Experience ==
In the 2005 Taiwanese National Assembly election, which implemented the Proportional Representation system, the Chinese People's Party (CPP) ended up with 1.08% of the vote, winning three seats and ranking fifth among the parties.

At the time, some KMT members argued that the reason why the PPP won three seats was because many voters mistook the Chinese People's Party for the Chinese Kuomintang, and that some voters even found out immediately after voting that they wanted to re-collect their ballots and vote again; however, the PPP argued that it was in fact due to the similarity of the party names that the party's supporters mistakenly voted for the KMT, which resulted in the loss of votes for the PPP.

In the 2005–06 Taiwanese local elections, the Chinese People's Party nominated one person: Wang Xiaoyu (Chinese: 王小玉)of the 6th constituency to run for Taipei City councilor, who was eventually defeated by 416 votes.

== Controversy ==
In April 2011, Wang Zhongquan's account was frozen after he failed to declare his political donations, and he was fined by the Supervisory Yuan two consecutive times. He said that he would hire a lawyer to sue Supervisory Yuan Chairman Wang Jianxuan and Legal Affairs Minister Zeng Yongfu. The Deputy Secretary of the Supervisory Yuan, Mr. Xu Haiquan, said that the Property Claims Office had communicated with Mr. Wang many times in accordance with the law and even suggested that he close his account to save trouble, but Mr. Wang did not accept the suggestion, and that the Supervisory Yuan could only respect Mr. Wang's decision to sue Mr. Wang if he insisted on filing a lawsuit.

== See also ==
- List of political parties in the Republic of China
