= China Old Veterans Unification Party =

Taiwanese political party

The China Old Veterans Unification Party (Chinese: 中國老兵統一黨) is a minor party in Taiwan. It has had a very minor role in politics.

== See also ==
- List of political parties in the Republic of China
