= Zhang Xiuye =

Taiwanese politician (born 1960)

- Born: 22 November 1960 (age 65); Shanghai, China
- Political party: Patriot Alliance Association; Chinese Democratic Progressive Party

Zhang Xiuye (simplified Chinese: 张秀叶; traditional Chinese: 張秀葉; pinyin: Zhāng Xiùyè; born 22 November 1960) is a Taiwanese politician who supports Chinese reunification. She is the secretary-general of the Patriot Alliance Association.

== Biography ==
Zhang is from Shanghai, China. She was interviewed by Public Television Director Cai Chonglong for the documentary "Chinese Brides in Taiwan". She claimed that she married and moved to Taiwan in 1992 and later filed for divorce, claiming domestic violence. However, her ex-husband refuted this, saying that Zhang had advertised in the newspaper and the two had corresponded with each other for many times before getting married. However, Zhang did not fulfill her cohabitation obligations after marriage, and the case ended in court.

Zhang "created political violence" against the Falun Gong group in Taipei 101 and shouted political slogans in support of the Chinese Communist Party. Some reports even pointed out that she "openly incited racial discrimination and slandered Europeans and Americans or passers-by who spoke in foreign languages." She is considered a repeat offender of creating political violence. In October 2014, Zhang was reported to have assaulted a female tourist from Chiayi, Taiwan, with Xiao Qin. On 3 January 2015, when the Tongxinhui and the pro-independence group confronted each other in front of Taipei 101, they said, "We want the Chinese Communist Party to wipe out Falun Gong!" On 19 January 2015, Zhang further insulted the Falun Gong group and publicly declared, "It would be useless even if we changed the Xinyi branch chief 10 times." She also attempted to attack Falun Gong members but was dissuaded by the police. On 6 March 2015, Zhang and others went to Taipei 101 to protest. Because the car was illegally parked and refused to obey the police's persuasion, the police forcibly towed the car back. Zhang herself also refused to obey the police's ban and had an argument with the police with three people present. She was then arrested and taken back for investigation.

In the 2018 local elections, she was suspected of bribery through dinner parties, and her funds were also suspected to come from overseas. On 8 March 2022, the second trial sentenced Zhang to three years and five months in prison for vote-buying in 2018.

== Legal problems ==
Zhang ran for Taipei City Council in the 2018 nine-in-one local elections and bribed voters by hosting a dinner. The Supreme Court rejected her appeal and sentenced her to three years and five months in prison for violating the Public Officials Election and Recall Act. In addition, because of the case of the Patriotic United Association involving violations of the National Security Law, she had fled to the People's Republic of China during the investigation and was wanted. Now that the sentence for the vote-buying case has been finalized, the prosecutor will reissue a warrant for her for the power of execution, and the statute of limitations will last until 2062.
