= 2009 Taiwanese local elections =

- 5 December 2009

17 magistrates/mayors and others (Note: 592 councillors; 211 township/city mayors; Figures in this infobox are for magistrate/mayor elections unless otherwise noted)
- Registered: 7,051,039
- Turnout: 63.34% ▼2.87 pp (Note: Compared to the turnout of the 23 magistrate/mayor elections of 2005)
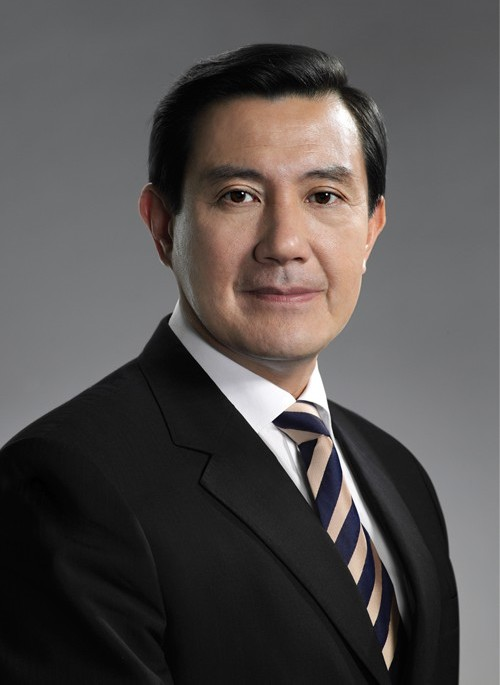

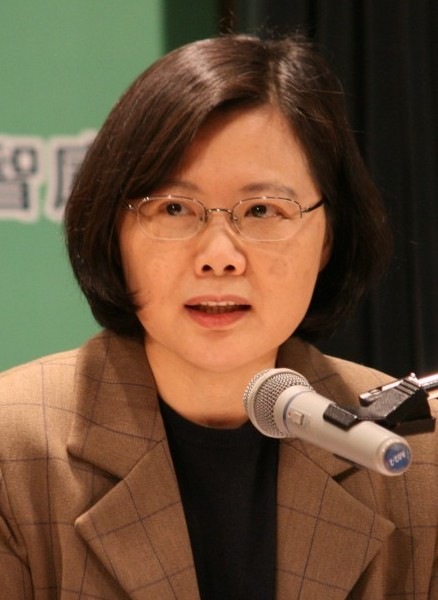
	First party	Second party
Leader	Ma Ying-jeou	Tsai Ing-wen
Party	KMT	DPP
Leader since	17 October 2009	20 May 2008
Last election	11 seats, 49.80%	3 seats, 38.19%
Seats won	12	4
Seat change	▲1	▲1
Popular vote	2,094,518	1,982,914
Percentage	47.88%	45.32%
Swing	▼1.93 pp	▲7.13 pp
Councillors	289	128
Township/city mayors	121	34
- Elected magistrate/mayor party by seat

Local elections were held in Taiwan on 5 December 2009 to elect magistrates of counties and mayors of cities, councillors in county/city councils, and mayors of townships and county-administered cities, known as the three-in-one elections (Chinese: 三合一選舉). The elections were not held in the special municipalities of Kaohsiung and Taipei as well as the counties and cities that were set to be reform as special municipalities in 2010, including Taipei County, Taichung County, Taichung City, Tainan County, Tainan City, or Kaohsiung County. The new formed municipalities has their elections in 2010.

== Election summaries ==
=== Magistrate and mayor elections ===
In the elections held for the 17 posts of county magistrates and city mayors, the Kuomintang (KMT) won control of 12 Counties and Cities, the Democratic Progressive Party (DPP) won control of 4 Counties, while the remaining county, Hualien, was won by an independent candidate. The DPP won 1,982,914 votes, or 45.32 per cent, which was a substantial increase from its 41.95 per cent in the 2005 elections. On the other hand, the KMT received 2,094,518 votes, or 47.87 percent, which was less than the 50.96 percent it won in the 2005 elections of 23 county magistrates and city mayors.

The KMT's traditional strongholds of Northern Taiwan was maintained, although its complete dominance in Northern Taiwan, was terminated when DPP candidate won the Election for the Yilan County Magistrate by a large margin. However, this north-eastern county was once a DPP stronghold for more than two decades until KMT incumbent Lu Kuo-hua, won power four years ago. In Keelung City and Hsinchu City the KMT incumbent Mayors won by a considerable margin, although in Taoyuan County, the KMT candidate won by an unexpectedly narrow margin. The fiercely contested position for Hsinchu County Magistrate, was eventually won by a KMT candidate who received 38% of the vote, whilst the DPP candidate garnered 31%, and an independent candidate received 30%.

In Central Taiwan, all four of the incumbent Magistrates secured their second term. In the traditionally Pan-Blue stronghold of Miaoli County, the KMT incumbent Magistrate won his second term with a large margin of approximately 30% of the votes. While in Changhua County and Nantou County, the KMT incumbent Magistrates both gained just over 50% of the votes, to secure their second terms. In Yunlin County, the DPP incumbent Magistrate gained nearly twice the number of votes as her opposition KMT candidate to secure her second term.

The DPP maintained its traditional strongholds of Southern Taiwan, winning both Chiayi County and Pingtung County by a great margin of 15% and 20% respectively. The KMT incumbent Mayor of Chiayi City won her second term by an unexpectedly narrow margin of 8000 votes. In Eastern Taiwan, the KMT's candidate for Taitung County Magistrate won the DPP's candidate by less 6000 votes, whilst Hualien County Magistrate was won by an Independent Candidate who gained more than twice the number of votes of his opposition KMT candidate. In the outlying islands, the incumbent Magistrate of Penghu County won the DPP's Candidate by less than 600 Votes, whilst in Kinmen County and Lienchiang County, the KMT Candidates gained respectively 38% and 57% of the vote to win both posts.

=== Councillor elections ===
The KMT maintained its unchallenged majority in the county and city councilmen elections, winning 289 seats of the 17 County and City Councils. The DPP won 128 seats, the Taiwan Solidarity Union won 3 seats, the People First Party won 1 seat and the Labor Party won 1 seat. The remaining 170 seats were won by independent candidates. The KMT won 43.94% of the votes, while the DPP won 24.42%.

=== Township Chiefs ===
The KMT maintained its unchallenged majority in the township chiefs elections, winning 121 posts. The DPP won 34 posts, while the remaining 56 posts were won by independent candidates. The KMT won 48.82% of the votes, while the DPP won 20.04%.

== Results ==
Taiwanese local elections, 2009
Party	County Magistrates and City Mayors			County and City Council legislators			Township Chiefs		
Party	Votes	Percentage	Seats	Votes	Percentage	Seats	Votes	Percentage	Seats
Kuomintang	2,094,518	47.88%	12	1,920,086	43.94%	289	1,865,159	48.82%	121
Democratic Progressive Party	1,982,914	45.32%	4	1,067,010	24.42%	128	765,816	20.04%	34
Taiwan Solidarity Union	－	－	－	27,286	0.62%	3	－	－	－
People First Party	－	－	－	5,748	0.13%	1	－	－	－
Labor Party	－	－	－	4,736	0.11%	1	－	－	－
Hakka Party	15,807	0.36%	0	－	－	－	－	－	－
Noble Savior Party	－	－	－	－	－	－	7,966	0.21%	0
Chinese Reunification Party	－	－	－	－	－	－	2,257	0.06%	0
Green Party	－	－	－	843	0.02%	0	－	－	－
Taiwan Nationalist Party	－	－	－	208	0.00%	0	－	－	－
Independent	281,693	6.44%	1	1,344,232	30.76%	170	2,095,128	28.00%	56
Total	4,374,932	100.00%	17	4,379,149	100.00%	587	3,820,810	100.00%	211
Voter turnout	63.34%			63.39%			64.11%		

=== Magistrate/mayor elections ===
Taiwanese county magistrates and city mayoral elections, 2009
County/City	Winning candidate	Party	Votes	Percentage
Changhua County	Cho Po-yuan	Kuomintang	348,341	54.89%
Chiayi City	Huang Min-hui	Kuomintang	69,962	52.20%
Chiayi County	Helen Chang	Democratic Progressive Party	177,333	55.92%
Hsinchu City	Hsu Ming-tsai	Kuomintang	92,667	55.63%
Hsinchu County	Chiu Ching-chun	Kuomintang	97,151	38.49%
Hualien County	Fu Kun-chi	Independent (Note: Fu Kun-chi was a member of Kuomintang. He ran as independent after lost the primary elections. He later expelled from the party.)	85,532	56.37%
Keelung City	Chang Tong-rong	Kuomintang	86,001	55.11%
Kinmen County	Li Wo-shi	Kuomintang	14,269	37.28%
Lienchiang County	Yang Sui-sheng	Kuomintang	3,135	57.19%
Miaoli County	Liu Cheng-hung	Kuomintang	181,256	63.79%
Nantou County	Lee Chao-ching	Kuomintang	136,951	50.87%
Penghu County	Wang Chien-fa	Kuomintang	22,664	49.37%
Pingtung County	Tsao Chi-hung	Democratic Progressive Party	270,402	59.33%
Taitung County	Justin Huang	Kuomintang	56,354	52.59%
Taoyuan County	John Wu	Kuomintang	396,237	52.22%
Yilan County	Lin Tsung-hsien	Democratic Progressive Party	133,394	54.26%
Yunlin County	Su Chih-fen	Democratic Progressive Party	229,958	65.37%

=== Councillor elections ===
Taiwanese county and city councilmen elections, 2009
County/City	No. of seats won by each party							
County/City	KMT	DPP	TSU	PFP	Labor	Green	TNP	IND
Changhua County	26	14	0	－	－	－	－	14
Chiayi City	8	6	1	－	－	－	－	9
Chiayi County	10	16	0	－	－	－	－	11
Hsinchu City	12	7	－	－	－	－	－	14
Hsinchu County	23	2	－	－	1	－	－	9
Hualien County	25	5	－	－	－	－	－	3
Keelung City	20	9	0	1	－	－	－	2
Kinmen County	9	0	－	－	－	－	－	10
Lienchiang County	4	－	－	－	－	－	－	5
Miaoli County	20	4	－	－	－	－	－	14
Nantou County	15	5	－	－	－	－	－	17
Penghu County	10	2	－	－	－	0	－	7
Pingtung County	25	12	0	－	－	－	－	18
Taitung County	22	1	1	－	－	－	－	6
Taoyuan County	30	17	－	0	－	－	0	13
Yilan County	17	15	－	0	－	－	－	2
Yunlin County	13	13	1	－	－	－	－	16

=== Township/city mayor elections ===
Taiwanese township chiefs elections, 2009
County	No. of posts won by each party				
County	KMT	DPP	NSP	CRP	IND
Changhua County	15	2	－	－	9
Chiayi County	5	8	－	0	5
Hsinchu County	11	－	－	－	2
Hualien County	12	1	－	－	0
Kinmen County	6	－	－	－	0
Lienchiang County	4	－	－	－	0
Miaoli County	14	－	－	－	4
Nantou County	8	1	0	－	4
Penghu County	5	0	－	－	1
Pingtung County	12	10	－	－	11
Taitung County	14	－	－	－	2
Taoyuan County	7	2	－	－	4
Yilan County	6	4	－	－	2
Yunlin County	2	6	－	－	12

== See also ==
- Elections in Taiwan
