= Anti-Infiltration Act =

Law of Taiwan

Legislative Yuan
- Citation: Anti-Infiltration Act
- Passed: 31 December 2019
- Signed by: President Tsai Ing-wen
- Signed: 15 January 2020
- Effective: 17 January 2020

Legislative history
- Second reading: 29 November 2019
- Third reading: 31 December 2019
- Status: In force

The Anti-Infiltration Act (Chinese: 反滲透法) is a law regulating the influence of entities deemed foreign hostile forces on the political processes of the Republic of China (commonly known as Taiwan), including elections and referendums. The act was passed by the Legislative Yuan on 31 December 2019 and promulgated by the Tsai Ing-wen presidential administration on 15 January 2020. The law has been used to prosecute individuals connected to united front organizations in Taiwan.

== History ==
President Tsai Ing-wen said in July 2016, and again in January 2017, that laws against espionage were necessary. Bills to counter espionage were proposed by the Ministry of Justice three times by February 2017, but all were rejected by a minister without portfolio. Democratic Progressive Party legislators Chen Ming-wen, Chuang Jui-hsiung, and Lo Chih-cheng stated that such bills should have included anti-infiltration measures. During the 2019 Democratic Progressive Party presidential primary, William Lai called for an anti-infiltration law to be passed. Later that year, the New Power Party was reported to be forming an anti-infiltration bill for consideration during the legislative session starting in September.

=== Proposal and passage ===
On 25 November 2019, the Democratic Progressive Party caucus formally proposed an anti-infiltration bill for legislative consideration. The anti-infiltration bill was moved to a second reading four days later. Kuomintang legislators boycotted the vote, and proposed the "bill against the annexation of the Republic of China" to replace the DPP's anti-infiltration bill.

Cross-caucus negotiations on the anti-infiltration bill took place in late December 2019, although only two of twelve articles were discussed, and the only agreement reached regarded the title of the act. The bill passed its third legislative reading on 31 December 2019, and became the Anti-Infiltration Act. The act passed 67–0 due to a Kuomintang boycott of the final reading, as the Democratic Progressive Party held a majority in the Ninth Legislative Yuan. Prior to its promulgation, Kuomintang and People First Party legislators petitioned the Council of Grand Justices for a ruling on the law. The Anti-infiltration Act took effect on 15 January 2020.

==== Proposed amendments ====
Legislator Kuo Kuo-wen proposed an amendment to Article 6 of the act in May 2020, linking the Anti-infiltration Act to provisions of the Criminal Code of the Republic of China covering cybersecurity, murder, intimidation and harm to others. An amendment drafted by Chiu Chih-wei in April 2022 proposed permitting the dissolution of political parties found by the Constitutional Court to have colluded with an enemy state to affect the outcome of an election in Taiwan.

== Content ==
The Anti-Infiltration Act contains twelve articles. It bars people from accepting money or acting on instructions from foreign hostile forces to lobby for political causes, make political donations, or disrupt assemblies, social order, elections, and referendums. Foreign hostile forces are defined by the act as countries or political entities at war or engaging in a military standoff with Taiwan. The act also includes provisions on disinformation. Violations of the act are punishable by a maximum fine not to exceed NT$10 million or five years imprisonment. Acts of infiltration were defined by considering applicable provisions of other laws, among them the Presidential and Vice Presidential Election and Recall Act, the Civil Servants Election and Recall Act, the Referendum Act, the Assembly and Parade Act and the Social Order Maintenance Act.

== Reception ==
=== Support ===
In addition to the Democratic Progressive Party caucus and majority in the Ninth Legislative Yuan, support for the Anti-Infiltration Act came from former defense minister Michael Tsai.

The New Power Party offered measured support, stating that the law could be further strengthened.

Taipei mayor Ko Wen-je supported the purpose of the bill but called for its wording to be clearly defined and for its contents to be discussed.

The bill/law has been cited by researchers as an important means for Taiwan to combat Mainland China’s propaganda and disinformation campaigns. Prior to its passage, Sung Cheng-en of the Taiwan Democracy Watch stated that the Anti-Infiltration Act should have included regulations on political propaganda.

=== Opposition ===
Taiwanese businesses and industry organizations located in China expressed opposition to the act, as did Terry Gou.

James Soong, chairman of the People First Party, was critical of the act, as were multiple high ranking Kuomintang officials, including Han Kuo-yu, Ma Ying-jeou, William Tseng, Wu Den-yih, and Eric Chu. The Labor Party described it in "White Terror 2.0". The former vice president Annette Lu commented that authoritarianism has been "restored".

Before the bill's passage in December 2019, Taiwan Affairs Office spokeswoman Zhu Fenglian stated that it had "already caused alarm and panic" amongst Taiwanese businesspeople and students in China.

== Effects ==
Tsai Ing-wen responded to criticisms of the Anti-Infiltration Act in a speech on 1 January 2020. After the act was promulgated on 15 January 2020, Tsai stressed that legal exchanges with China would not be adversely affected, and asked the Executive Yuan and Straits Exchange Foundation to clarify questions about the law.

Flags of the People's Republic of China, first flown along Mofan Street in Jincheng, Kinmen, in 2018 to welcome Chinese tourists, were voluntarily taken down days after the Anti-Infiltration Act passed its third legislative reading, as residents feared that the law made flying the PRC flag illegal.

Master Chain (大師鏈), a pro-Chinese government media outlet, withdrew from the Taiwan market following the passage of the Anti-Infiltration Act.

The first warrants and searches under the purview of the act were carried out during the 2022 local election cycle. Legal actions for violations of the Anti-Infiltration Act during the 2022 elections continued into 2024. In August 2023, three individuals connected to united front organizations in Taiwan were indicted for violations of the law. In October 2023, the founder of the Taiwan People's Communist Party, Lin Te-wang, and two other party members were indicted under the Anti-Infiltration Act for undertaking pro-Chinese Communist Party influence operations in coordination with the Taiwan Affairs Office to interfere in elections. In 2025, The Taipei District Court found two of the three defendants not guilty. In December 2023, one month before presidential and legislative elections were to be held, seventeen indictments for violations of the Anti-Infiltration Act were issued. The same month, the former deputy chairman of the For Public Good Party and others were arrested on suspicion on contravening the Anti-Infiltration Act for receiving money from China to fabricate political opinion polling. In January 2024, a former Taiwan People's Party candidate, Ma Chih-wei, was arrested on allegations of receiving campaign funding from China in violation of the Anti-Infiltration Act. Investigative efforts expanded as the 2024 general election drew closer. Over fifty people were questioned by the Yilan District Prosecutors' Office for suspected violations of the Anti-Infiltration Act, and former legislator Chang Hsien-yao was questioned by the Ciaotou District Prosecutors Office.

== See also ==
- Fake news
- Foreign electoral intervention
- Foreign Agents Registration Act (United States)
- Foreign Interference (Countermeasures) Act 2021 (Singapore)
- National Security Act, law to block 'pro-North Korea' united front in Republic of Korea (South Korea).
