= Taiwan Nationalist Party =

Taiwan Nationalist Party 台灣國民黨
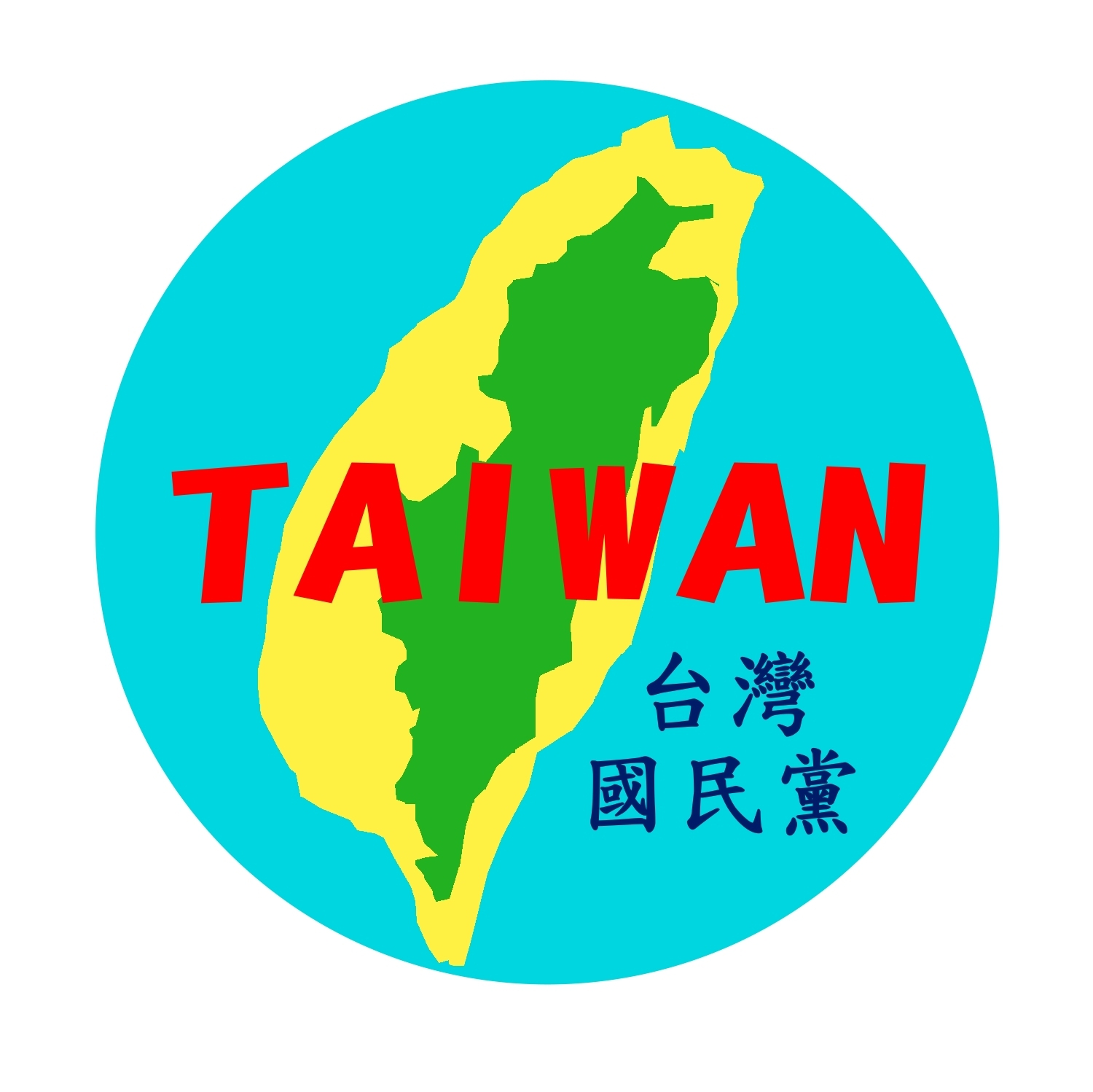
- Abbreviation: TNP
- Chairperson: Kan Nai-ti (甘乃迪)
- Registered: 27 May 2007
- Dissolved: 29 April 2020
- Headquarters: Taoyuan, Taoyuan, Taiwan
- Ideology: Taiwanese nationalism Taiwanese independence

Website
- www.twkmt.mymailer.com.tw

The Taiwan Nationalist Party (TNP; Chinese: 台灣國民黨; pinyin: Táiwān Guómíndǎng) was a political party officially registered on 27 May 2007, being the 127th legal political party in Taiwan. The party was founded in July 2005 by activists supportive of Taiwanese independence. It has been dissolved by the Ministry of the Interior.

== History ==
Kan Nai-ti (甘乃迪) became the first chairperson of the Taiwan Nationalist Party on 30 July 2005 in Taoyuan. Lacking in preparations, it was not legalised until 27 May 2015. Before registration, there was a suggestion to change the name to distinguish from the Kuomintang (Chinese Nationalist Party) from the Ministry of the Interior.

On 29 April 2020, the Taiwan Nationalist Party was dissolved by the Ministry of the Interior for failing to comply with the requirements of the Political Parties Act.

== Ideology ==
The Taiwan Nationalist Party stated it was centrist and supported Taiwanese nationalism. The party's core ideology focused on promoting Taiwanese independence and the establishment of Taiwan as a de jure sovereign nation, separate from the People's Republic of China.

This stance aligned with the broader Taiwanese independence movement, which emphasizes Taiwan’s distinct cultural and political identity and supports the formal declaration of an independent Taiwanese state.

== Election results ==
Officially registered in 2007 and dissolved in 2020, the Taiwan Nationalist Party did not participated in Taiwan's national-level elections. Instead, it focused on local politics, though with limited success.

The TNP fielded candidates in the 2009 Taiwanese local elections for the Taoyuan County. The party secured only 208 votes, accounting for <0.01% of the total, and did not win any seats in county and city councils.
