= For Public Good Party =

For Public Good Party 中華民族致公黨
- Chairperson: Chen Po-kuang
- Founded: 18 December 2000
- Registered: 21 April 2002
- Headquarters: 21 Chang'an East Road Section 1, Taipei
- Ideology: Chinese unification Conservatism (Taiwanese)
- Political position: Right-wing to far-right
- National affiliation: Pro-Beijing camp
- Legislative Yuan: 0 / 113
- Municipal mayors: 0 / 6
- Magistrates/mayors: 0 / 16
- Councilors: 0 / 912
- Township/city mayors: 0 / 204

Website
- www.facebook.com/fpg.org.tw/

For Public Good Party (Chinese: 中華民族致公黨; pinyin: zhōnghuá mínzú zhìgōngdǎng; lit. 'Chinese Nation Public Interest Party'), or For All Mankind Equality Party, is a Chinese nationalist right-wing political party in Taiwan (Republic of China). Advocating Chinese unification, the party was elected to local council and as township mayors.

== History ==
For Public Good Party and other parties, including China Zhi Gong Party which was part of the ruling United Front in China, originated from "Chee Kung Tong", an organisation under Hongmen. The party was founded on 18 December 2000 and was registered on 21 April 2002, with Wang Jui-sheng as founding chairperson. The Chinese name of the party originally carried "Taiwan, China" (中國台灣), and was only amended to "Chinese nation" in 2017, two years after Chen Po-kuang took over.

"For Public Good", "For All Mankind Equality", "Zhi Gong", and "Chee Kung" all refer to the Chinese word "致公", with the latter two being transliterations. "致公" is believed to be from "致和欲事，公義同謀。", meaning "committed to golden mean for justice".

The party supports the unification of Taiwan and China, and is relatively active in the interaction with Chinese political parties.

In December 2023, the former deputy chairman of the party and others were arrested on suspicion on contravening the Anti-Infiltration Act for receiving money from China to fabricate political opinion polling.

== Leaders ==
Below is the list of chairpersons of For Public Good Party:

1. Wang Jui-sheng (王瑞陞) (2000–2015)
2. Chen Po-kuang (陳柏光) (2015–)

== Electoral performances ==
The party first ran in 2018 local election, winning in Taoyuan and Kinmen.

Election	Magistrates and mayors	Councillors	Township/city mayors	Township/city council representatives	Village chiefs	Party leader
2018	0 / 22	1 / 912	1 / 204	2 / 2,148	1 / 7,744	Chen Po-kuang

== See also ==
- China Zhi Gong Party
- Tiandihui
