= Flag of Taichung =

City flag in Taiwan

Flag of Taichung (Chinese: 臺中市市旗; pinyin: Táizhōngshì Shìqí) is a city flag representing Taichung City, Taiwan. The current flag was adopted on August 26, 2025.

== History ==
Old flag of Taichung

The flag of Taichung used to featured a yellow background with red text of the city's name ("臺中市") since its establishment in 1945, and was continued to be used after Taichung County merged with the city.

The new flag's design was criticised by local media, politicians, and unofficial online voting, with some describing the flag as "the ugliest city flag in Taiwan". After an online voting on PTT in 2016, the Taichung City government held an online audition for a new city flag. The flag was voted on 18 February 2017. The government promised to modify its minor design before using it, but it was not used in the end.

On August 26, 2025, the Taichung City government published the Taichung City Flag Design and Usage Guidelines (臺中市市旗制式及使用要點) and announced the new city flag. The new city flag featured a mid-lake pavilion of Taichung Park in the middle, and the city's name in Latin ("TAICHUNG") and Chinese ("臺中") on the bottom. The Chinese text's font is designed by Xiao Shiqiong (蕭世瓊), a professor of the National Taiwan Normal University who had designed the Taichung City Hall's logo. Lu Shiow-yen, then mayor of Taichung, explained that the flag can fit its government flag and minimise the cost of designing and adapting. The flag costed 140,000 NTD to design.
