= Taiwan Democratic Communist Party =

Political party in Taiwan (2009–2020)

Taiwan Democratic Communist Party 臺灣民主共產黨
- Leader: Chen Tien-fu
- Founded: 1 October 2009
- Dissolved: 29 April 2020
- Split from: Communist Party of the Republic of China
- Headquarters: No. 26, Quanzhou Street, Zhongzheng District, Taipei
- Ideology: Socialism with Chinese characteristics; Chinese unification
- National affiliation: Pro-Beijing camp

Party flag

Taiwan Democratic Communist Party
- Traditional Chinese: 臺灣民主共產黨
- Simplified Chinese: 台湾民主共产党
Transcriptions
Standard Mandarin
- Hanyu Pinyin: Táiwān Mínzhǔ Gòngchǎndǎng
Hakka
- Romanization: Thòi-vàn Mìn-chú Khiung-sán-tóng
Southern Min
- Hokkien POJ: Tâi-oân Bîn-chú Kiōng-sán-tóng

The Taiwan Democratic Communist Party (Note: In local languages: Traditional Chinese script: 臺灣民主共產黨; Mandarin Pinyin: Táiwān Mínzhǔ Gòngchǎndǎng; Hokkien: Tâi-oân Bîn-chú Kiōng-sán-tóng; Sixian Hakka: Thòi-vàn Mìn-chú Khiung-sán-tóng) was a minor political party in Taiwan. It was founded on 1 October 2009 by Chen Tien-fu, cousin of former president Chen Shui-bian. The party's stated purpose was to create a distinct form of socialism in Taiwan and work towards unification with the People's Republic of China.

== History ==
Chen Tien-fu co-founded the Communist Party of the Republic of China on 31 March 2009 and became its general secretary. However, five months later, Chen announced that he and his supporters could not accept the use of "Republic of China" in the party's name, and that he did not have any real power as general secretary. The Communist Party of the Republic of China subsequently expelled Chen from the party on 25 September 2009, prompting Chen to establish the Taiwan Democratic Communist Party on 1 October 2009 as a rival party. Chen later said that he specifically chose the date 1 October 2009 because it was the 60th anniversary of the establishment of the People's Republic of China.

On 18 September 2013, Democratic Progressive Party legislator Tien Chiu-chin announced that she had been invited by the Taiwan Democratic Communist Party to attend a National Day of the People's Republic of China celebration in Shanghai. Tien criticized the invitation as an attempt by the PRC government "to use Taiwan's freedom of speech and freedom of association to create a united front in Taiwan." Tien further said that the invitation was "unacceptable" and that action should be taken. Huang Li-hsin, the director of Taiwan's Department of Civil Affairs at the time, commented that the Act Governing Cross-Strait Relations only prohibited Taiwanese citizens from holding public office in mainland China, and that there were no restrictions preventing Taiwanese political parties from hosting or participating in pro-PRC events in mainland China. The Taiwan Democratic Communist Party later announced on 25 September 2013 that they had cancelled their National Day celebration in Shanghai. In an interview with Taiwan's Central News Agency, Chen said that the decision was made due to "many unspeakable reasons" but declined to elaborate.

The party was dissolved by the Ministry of the Interior on 29 April 2020.

== See also ==
- Taiwanese Communist Party
- Taiwan People's Communist Party
