= Patriot Alliance Association =

Chinese Patriot Alliance Association 中華愛國同心會/中華愛國同心黨
- Leader: Chou Ching-chun
- Secretary-General: Zhang Xiuye
- Founded: August 13, 2018
- Headquarters: Wanhua District, Taipei, Taiwan
- Ideology: Chinese unification Socialism with Chinese characteristics (de jure); One country, two systems Chinese conservatism Anti–Taiwan independence
- Political position: Right-wing to far-right
- National affiliation: Pro-Beijing camp
- Colours: Red, Blue, White
- Legislative Yuan: 0 / 113

Party flag
- Politics of Taiwan; Political parties; Elections; A: It is the day the Patriot Alliance Association (PAA) was founded as a political party; the PAA was founded as a political organization in November 12, 1993.

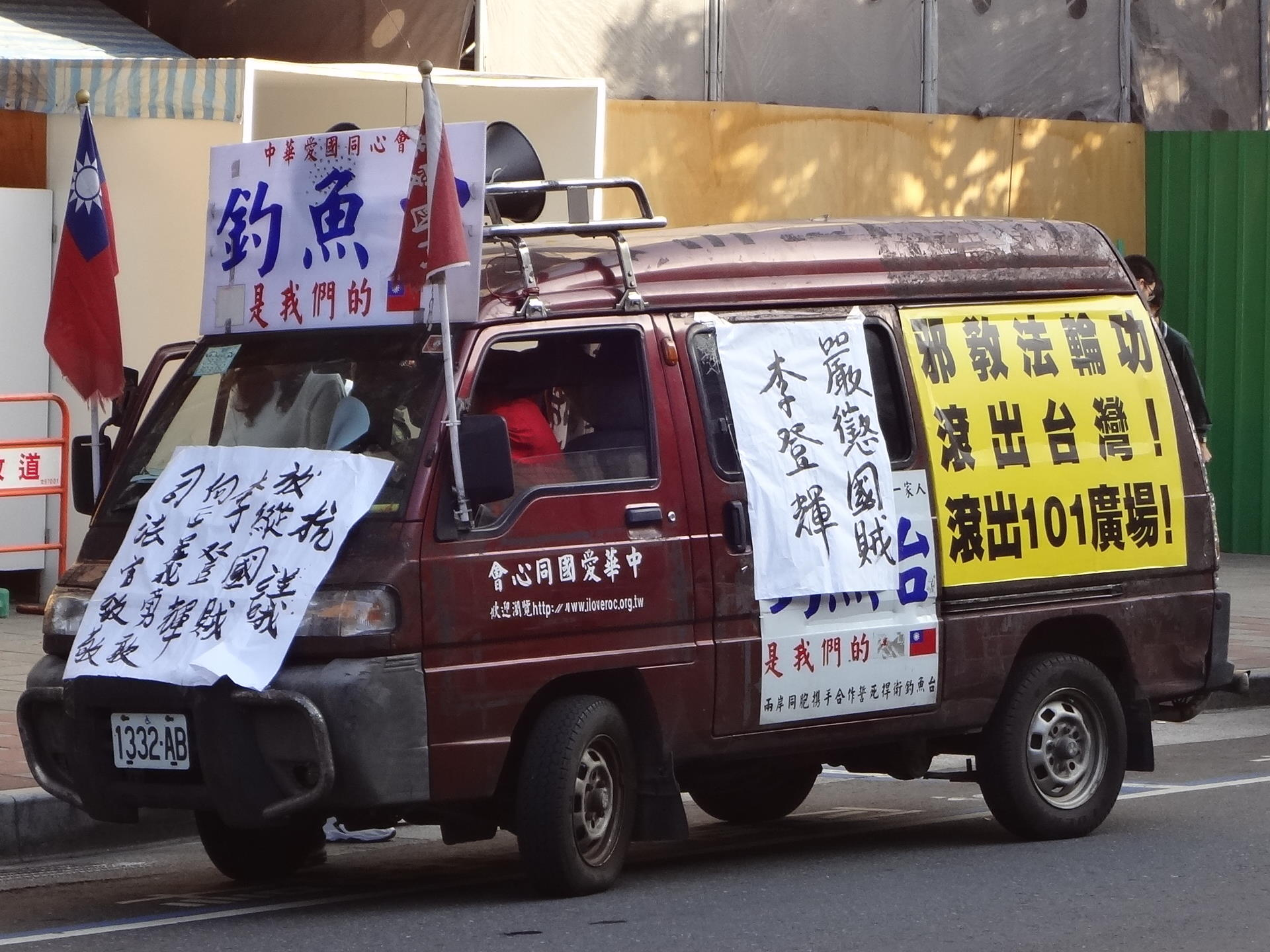
Sound truck belonging to the Patriot Alliance Association bearing ROC flags, with anti-Falun Gong and anti-Lee Teng-hui slogans, and declaring that the Senkaku (Diaoyu) Islands belong to China.

The (Chinese) Patriot Alliance Association (Chinese: 愛國同心會), abbreviated PAA, also known as the Concentric Patriotism Alliance (Chinese: 中華愛國同心會) or the Concentric Patriotism Association of China is a pro-Chinese Communist Party (CCP) organization that supports the unification of Taiwan and China. The PAA is principally described as a pro-CCP party and it is described by Xiao Jiahong writing for Minbao as a far-right party. Despite its pro-Communist position, it continues to use ROC symbolism.

== History ==
The organization was founded in 1993 and has been subjected to multiple public complaints of harassment and aggression. Because of this, its members have been informally labeled "Communist thugs in Taiwan". Members of the PAA engaged in altercations with Falun Gong-practitioners during demonstrations in front of the Taipei 101 square in 2010 which escalated to physical violence.

Zhang Xiuye is a founding member of the PAA. She was born in Shanghai, married a Taiwanese and then moved to Taiwan around 1993, after which she and her husband divorced. According to some sources, Zhang is considered the leader of the PAA.

In January 1997, the Chosun Ilbo, a conservative South Korean newspaper, reported that the PAA, along with the New Party, was a "far-right" and "anti-Korean"; the report stated that they had torn up the South Korean national flag in protest against the South Korean government and pro-environmental South Korean demonstrators who opposed the Lee Teng-hui administration’s attempt to transfer Taiwan’s nuclear waste to North Korea's territory through negotiations with the North Korean government.

Another member of the PAA is the Vietnamese-born Su An-sheng (蘇安生), who had reportedly kicked the former President of Taiwan, Chen Shui-bian, in the back.

On August 2018, 30 members of pro-Beijing Taiwanese groups, including the PAA, staged a protest in downtown Taipei in front of the Japan–Taiwan Exchange Association—Japan’s official liaison office for Taiwan—chanting slogans such as "Don’t forget Japan’s history of aggression against China" and "Japan must pay compensation to the comfort women." They are accused of collusion with mainland China, claiming Taiwan's sovereignty over Senkaku Islands (known as the Diaoyu Islands in China and Taiwan) claims. In recent years, pro-Beijing groups waving the Five-Star Red Flag in the streets have become a prominent sight in Taiwan, prompting calls for regulations to be imposed.

In July 2022, the Taipei District Prosecutors' Office disclosed that the PAA's attempts to influence Taiwanese politics were funded by the Taiwan Affairs Office in China. Wanted notices were issued for Lin Ming-mei, the wife of former party chairman Chou Ching-chun, and the party's secretary-general, Zhang Xiuye.

== See also ==
- United front in Taiwan
- Chinese Democratic Progressive Party
- Chinese Unification Promotion Party
