= Conservatism in Taiwan =

Political ideologies focused on the One-China policy

Conservatism in Taiwan is a broad political philosophy that espouses the identification of the Republic of China (ROC) government on the island of Taiwan as the legitimate ruler of all of China as opposed to the current rule of mainland China and their competing claims by the People's Republic of China (PRC).

It adopted the One China policy and the 1992 Consensus as a basis for Taiwan's security and economic development, as opposed to Taiwanization and Taiwanese sovereignty. Fundamental conservative ideas are grounded in Confucian values and strands of Chinese philosophy associated with Sun Yat-sen's teachings, a large centralized government that intervenes closely in the lives of individuals on both social and economic levels and the construction of a unified Sinocentric national identity. Conservative ideology in Taiwan constitutes the character and policies of the Kuomintang (KMT) and that of the Pan-Blue camp against the progressive Taiwanese nationalist Democratic Progressive Party and the Pan-Green camp.

== Origins and philosophy ==
=== Socioreligious tradition of Confucianism ===
There are four basic elements of Confucianism which apply to conservatist governance. The Paternalistic State entails top-down decision making under the notion that the “Father is the head of the house, and likewise, the state the head of society.” Leaders possess jen, a supreme virtue representing human qualities at their best, which determines their right to rule. The idea of social order and harmony translates into the assumption of the benevolent state – ren/humaneness, with which civil society works together – shu/reciprocity, rather than oppose, monitor, and scrutinize.

=== Sun Yat-sen's political perspectives ===
Many of the Kuomintang's policies were inspired by its founder Sun Yat-sen’s vision, and his Three Principles of the People: nationalism (民族主義), democracy (民權主義) and people’s livelihood (民生主義). The Three Principles combine to make Taiwan a free, powerful, and prosperous nation although they are selectively interpreted in a specific context which deviates from Sun Yat-sen's original intent. For example, during Chiang Kai-shek’s rule and much of Chiang Ching-kuo’s, the authoritarian state overshadowed democracy by censoring the people’s voice. However, most of his political ideas which were later adapted by his successors in governing Taiwan included equalization of land ownership, learning Chinese traditional morality through Confucian values, and the regulation of state capital by national corporations.

== Current status ==
=== Kuomintang and internal dilemmas ===
Domestically, conservatism within the KMT treads a thin line. Most Chinese nationalists in the party insist that it is the “real” China, advocating unification under the ROC through military force (during Chiang era) or through peaceful means by cross-straits interactions (present era), implementing Sun's Three Principles as the governing ideology in all of China and Taiwan, sticking to ROC-legalism, anti-communism, opposing PRC-centered unification efforts by mainland China and opposing Taiwanese localist movements.

The rise of a pan-Taiwanese independence movement by younger members, that does not acknowledge the 1992 consensus and hence claims that Taiwan is already an independent country, has challenged the status quo and ROC legitimacy. The KMT advocated maintaining pragmatic diplomacy to maintain cross-straits peace, participate in international institutions, maintaining diplomatic ties, signing economic deals et.. which foreseeably involves drawing Taiwan closer to the powerful communist mainland, and earning the disdain and ire of a vigilant populace. To further exacerbating this tension, the KMT has also suffered from undemocratic perceptions with its opaque tendencies, after its evasion of a clause by clause review of the Cross-Strait Service Trade Agreement, which prompted the Sunflower Student Movement to damage the party's credibility.

Some anti-communist conservatives of Taiwan, has historically maintained a friendly and complex ideological relationship with American neoconservativism. "Blue Team" as a political term refers to a group of politicians and journalists involved in the belief that the People's Republic of China is a security and political threat to the United States and democracies, and is ideologically related to neoconservatism; blue is also the symbolic color of the Republic of China and the Kuomintang.

=== Deteriorating relationship with the PRC ===
In recent years, the KMT has been gradually falling out of China's favor. Following the KMT election loss of 2016, the KMT began to shift its pro-China policy towards the median to better represent the view of the electorate. In short, it began campaigning under the ideal of dual identity, which included both “Chinese” and “Taiwanese” citizens. However, this change in the party line was criticized by China, which it perceived as capitulating to localist forces.

== Other conservatives ==
=== Conservative Taiwanese nationalists ===
Lee Teng-hui, president of the Republic of China from 1988 to 2000, was a member of the conservative Kuomintang when he took office and led Taiwan's democratizing reforms. He sought to "Taiwanize" the Kuomintang (or Chinese Nationalist Party). After Lee endorsed the candidates of the newly formed Pan-Green Taiwan Solidarity Union, a party established by a number of his KMT allies, Lee was expelled from the KMT on 21 September 2001. Lee is known as a devout Christian. In 2014, there was a controversy when he expressed his negationist views on Nanjing Massacre and Comfort women, sensitive issues in Korea and China, in the Japanese magazine SAPIO published by Shogakukan.

The Taiwan Solidarity Union (TSU) is politically conservative pan-Green party, which opposes transgender rights. Unlike TSU, other progressive pan-Green parties support LGBT rights.

The Taiwanese Localism Front, a radical anti-communist organization, is also referred to as far-right. It is strongly opposed to China and defends militarist policies.

=== Pro-Beijing camp ===
Some Chinese nationalists, called "radical pro-unification factions", disillusioned with the increasing successful localization efforts to Taiwanize the ROC and dissatisfied with the Kuomintang's policy changes, have begun to advocate the ethnic nationalist notion that the PRC represent the "true" China and the People's Liberation Army should use military force to "liberate" Taiwan to stop such efforts and pose a physical threat to Taiwanese nationalists, moderate democrats in the KMT and Chinese dissidents in Taiwan. Because the PRC is a one-party dictatorship, pro-Beijing conservatism in Taiwan, a liberal democracy, is sometimes described as "far-right".

Known examples of pro-Beijing right-wing parties include the Chinese Unification Promotion Party, Patriot Alliance Association, For Public Good Party, and New Party. However, within the pro-Beijing camp, there are also leftist, socialist / communist parties, including the Labor Party, Taiwan Democratic Communist Party and Taiwan People's Communist Party. The organized crime groups in Taiwan, driven by financial incentives also support the PRC unification efforts; in modern times, Taiwan's triads has been under investigation over allegations of ties to the government of the People's Republic of China.

== Political parties ==
The Conservative parties in Taiwan or the "pan-blue camp" includes the Kuomintang (KMT), the People First Party (PFP) and the New Party (NP). However, conservative parties in Taiwan do not always belong to pan-blue camp.

As of 2024, the Kuomintang is the main conservative party and the largest opposition party in the Legislative Yuan, with 52 seats.

People's First Party is a liberal conservative party, founded by former KMT General Secretary and Taiwan Provincial Governor James Soong after the 2000 presidential elections.

=== Current parties ===
- Chinese Unification Promotion Party
- For Public Good Party
- Kuomintang
- New Party
- Patriot Alliance Association
- People First Party
- Taiwan Solidarity Union
- Young China Party

=== Historical parties ===
- Congress Party Alliance
- Minkuotang
- The Motorists' Party of ROC

== Media ==
- Central Daily News (1928–2006)
- Chung T'ien Television (1994–present)
- China Television (1968–present)
- China Times (1950–present)
- Commercial Times (1978–present)
- TVBS (1993–present)
- United Daily News (1951–present)

== Prominent figures ==
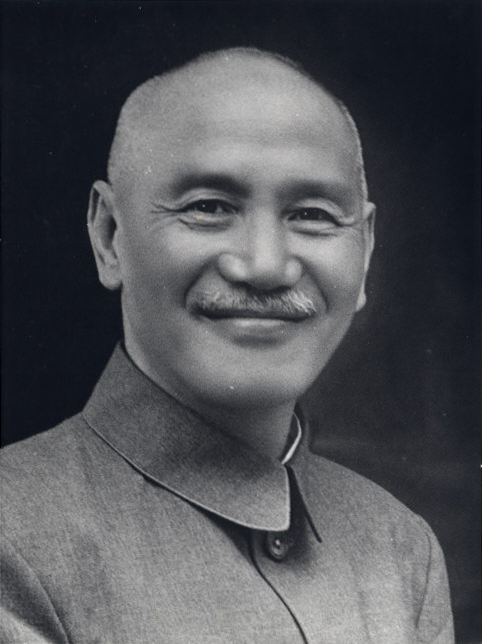
Chiang Kai-shek

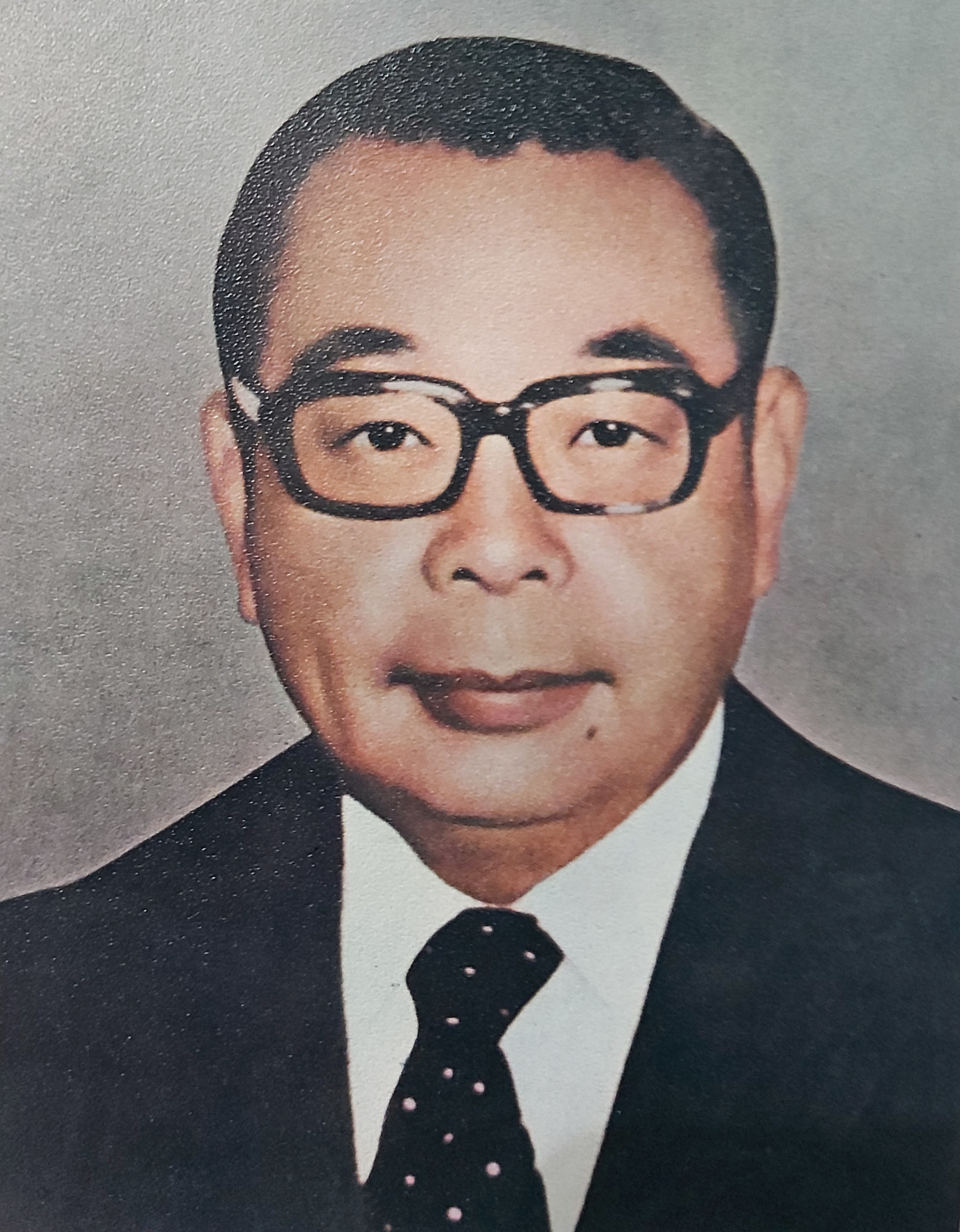
Chiang Ching-kuo

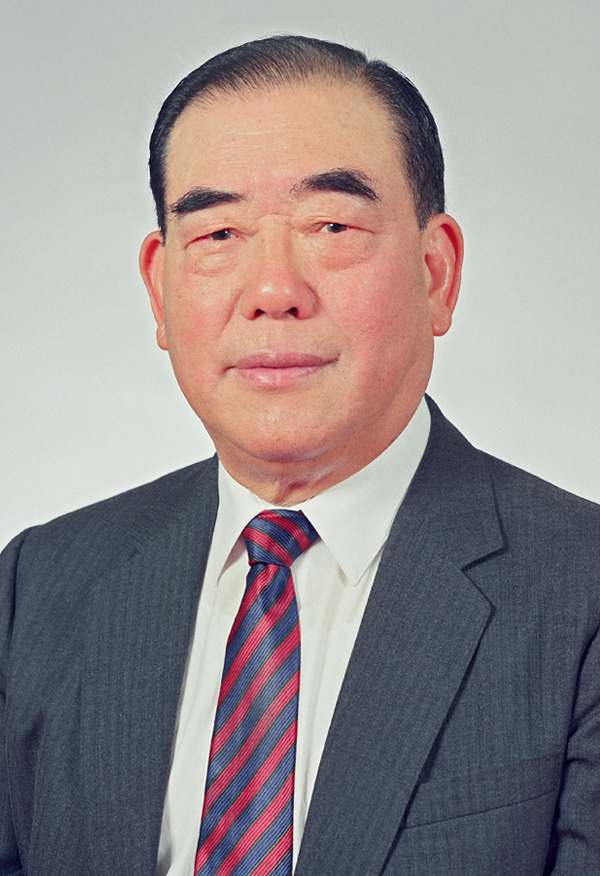
Hau Pei-tsun

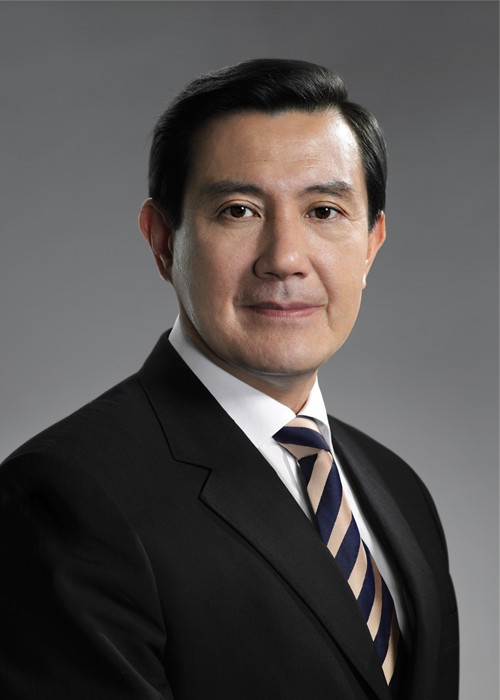
Ma Ying-jeou

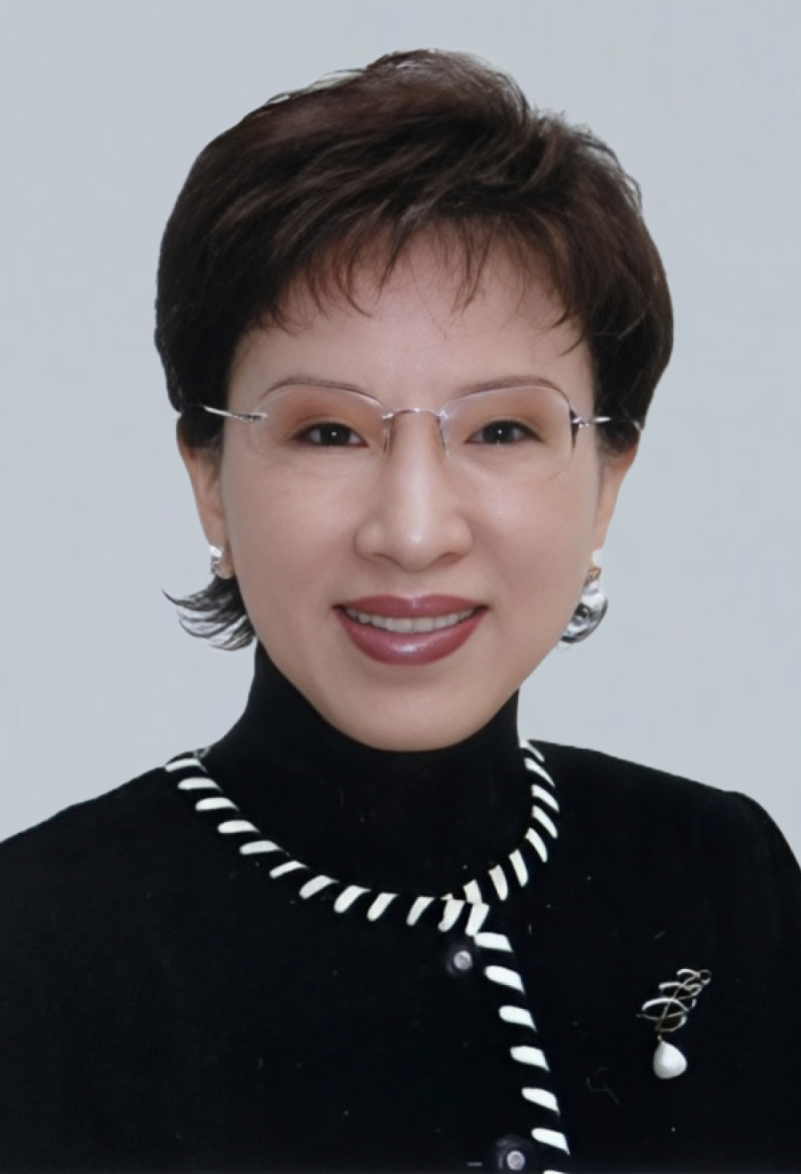
Hung Hsiu-chu

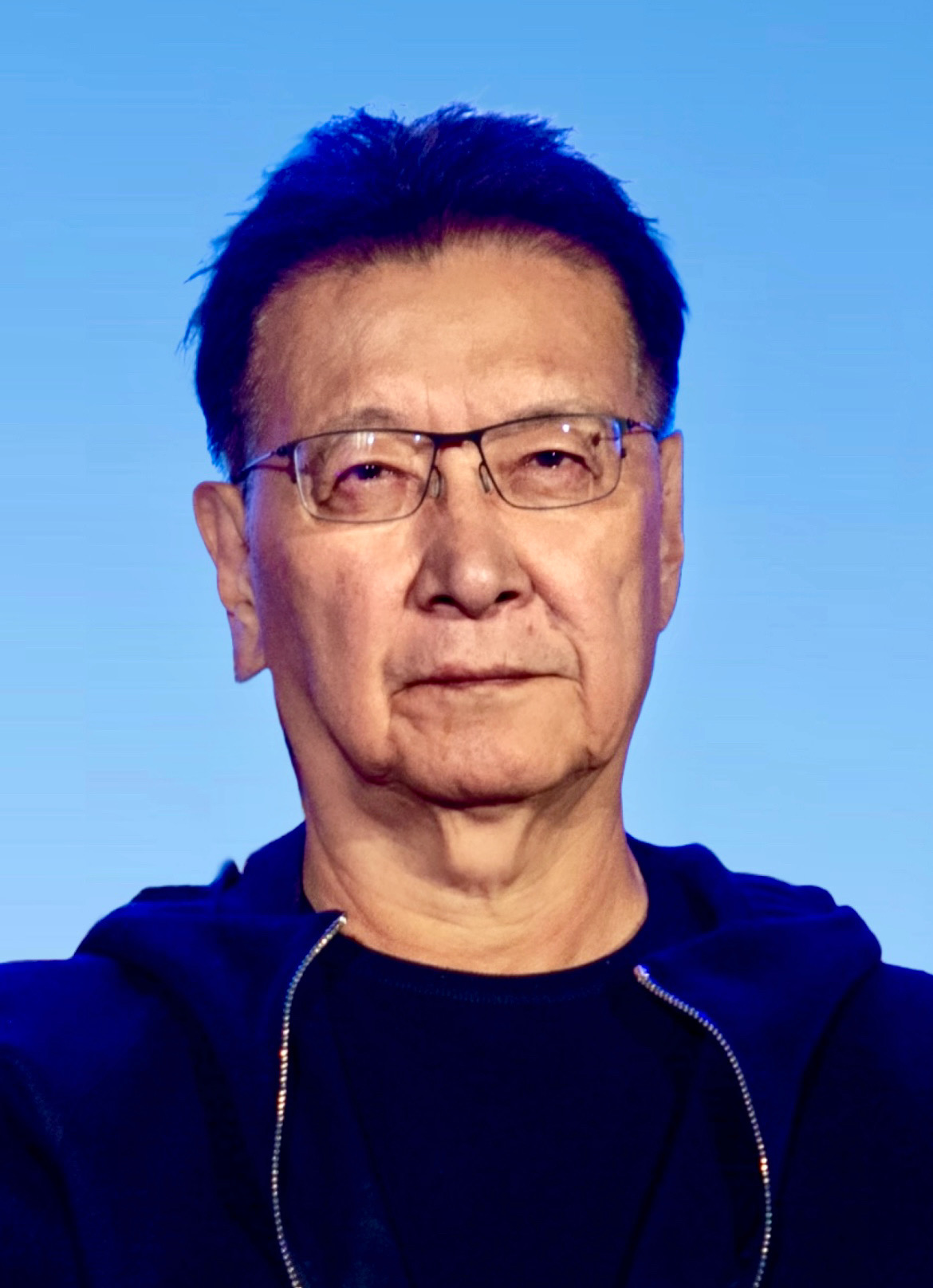
Jaw Shaw-kong

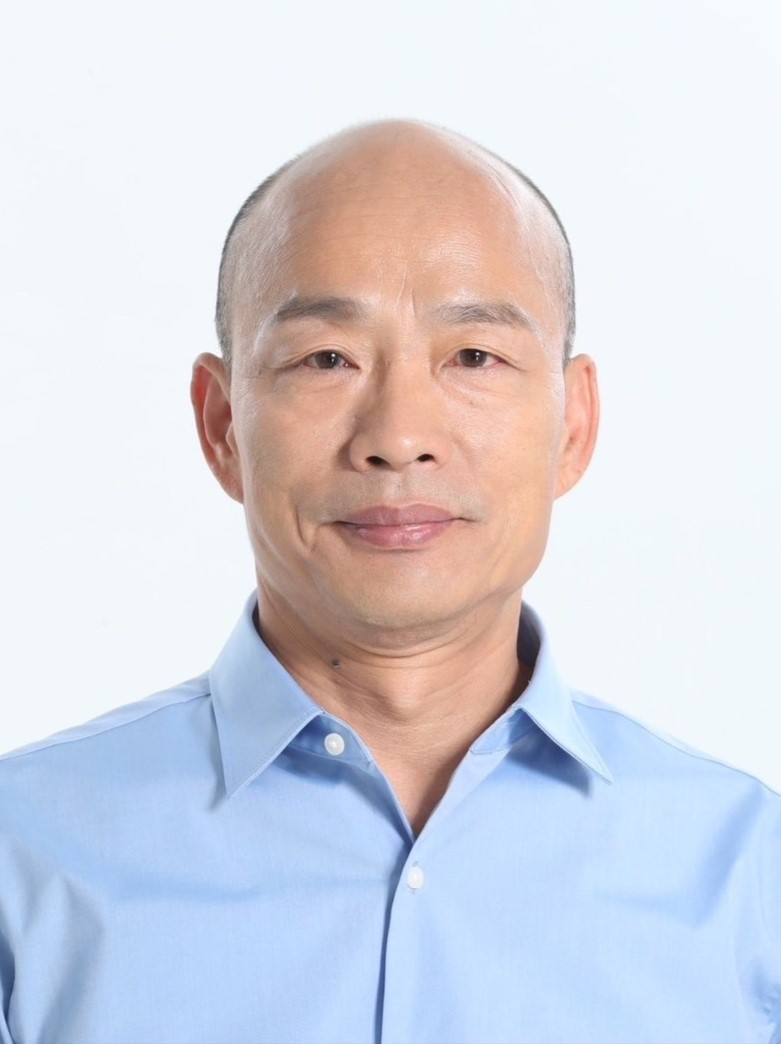
Han Kuo-yu

== See also ==
- Chiangism
- Conservatism in China
- Progressivism in Taiwan
- Want Want
