= Taiwan People's Communist Party =

Political party in Taiwan

- Leader: Lin Te-wang
- Secretary-General: Lu Hsin-shang
- Founded: 4 February 2017; 9 years ago
- Headquarters: Xinying District, Tainan
- Ideology: Socialism with Chinese characteristics; Chinese unification
- National affiliation: Pro-Beijing camp

Party flag
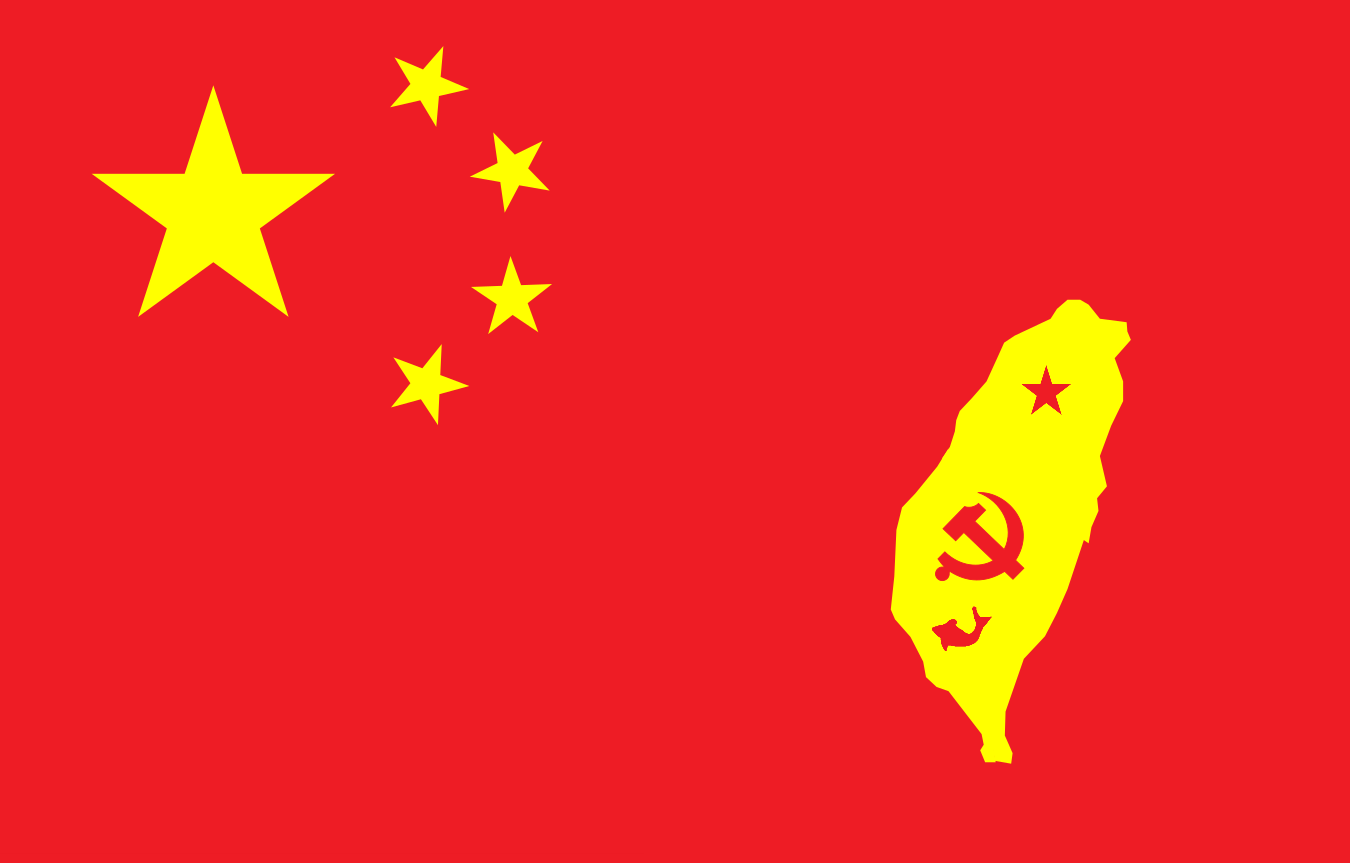

Chinese name
- Traditional Chinese: 臺灣人民共產黨
- Simplified Chinese: 台湾人民共产党
Transcriptions
Standard Mandarin
- Hanyu Pinyin: Táiwān Rénmín Gòngchǎndǎng
Hakka
- Romanization: Thòi-vàn Ngìn-mìn Khiung-sán-tóng
Southern Min
- Hokkien POJ: Tâi-oân Lîn-bîn Kiōng-sán-tóng

The Taiwan People's Communist Party (Note: In local languages: Traditional Chinese script: 臺灣人民共產黨; Mandarin Pinyin: Táiwān Rénmín Gòngchǎndǎng; Hokkien: Tâi-oân Lîn-bîn Kiōng-sán-tóng; Sixian Hakka: Thòi-vàn Ngìn-mìn Khiung-sán-tóng) is a minor political party in Taiwan. It was founded by businessman Lin Te-wang in 2017 and was the sixth party with "communist" in its name to register with the Ministry of the Interior. It advocates socialism and Chinese unification.

Taiwanese authorities accused Lin and two other party members of colluding with the Chinese Communist Party to influence the 2024 presidential and legislative elections. The trio were consequently indicted under Taiwan's Anti-Infiltration Act. Two of the three were found not guilty by a district court in 2025.

== History ==
Before establishing the Taiwan People's Communist Party, Lin Te-wang was a member of the Kuomintang's central committee. Lin sought the Kuomintang's nomination for Tainan City Constituency 1 in the 2016 legislative election, but the party declined. He subsequently left the Kuomintang and ran unsuccessfully as an independent.

Disgruntled with both the Kuomintang and the Democratic Progressive Party, Lin established the Taiwan People's Communist Party a year later, on 4 February 2017. It was the sixth party with "communist" in its name to register with the Ministry of the Interior. Lin originally applied for party registration under the name "Communist Party of China in Taiwan", but was told by the Ministry of Interior that the name could not be used due to existing laws on Cross-Strait relations. The party's inaugural meeting was held on 4 February 2017 in Xinying District, Tainan.

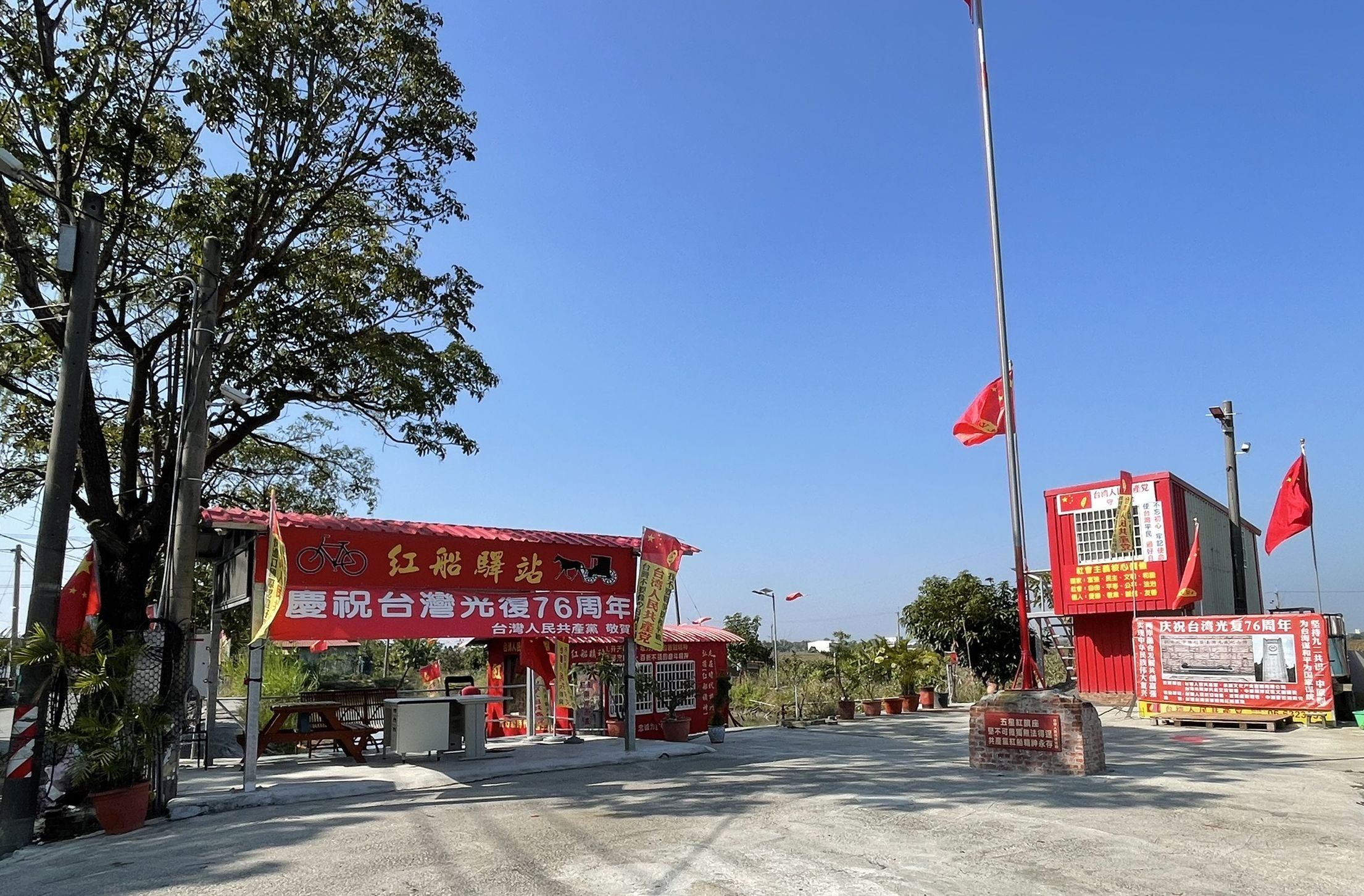
The party headquarters shortly before a court ordered its demolition in 2022

In the run-up to the 2020 legislative election, the Taiwan People's Communist Party was accused of vote buying with money channeled from mainland China. Tainan authorities launched a preliminary investigation after being tipped off and raided the party's offices on 30 December 2019. Sixty party members were detained for questioning. Tainan Deputy Chief Prosecutor Lin Chung-pin announced a few days later that those detained would be charged with contravening Taiwan's National Security Act and provisions of the Civil Servants Election and Recall Act. According to the prosecution, the party's leadership took several Tainan residents on trips to Jiangsu Province in exchange for their votes.

In 2023, Lin Te-wang and two other party members were indicted under the Anti-Infiltration Act for allegedly colluding with the Chinese Communist Party to influence the 2024 presidential and legislative elections. The Chinese government's Taiwan Affairs Office subsequently condemned the indictments. The Taipei District Court ruled in June 2025 that Lin and the party's vice chairman Cheng Chien-hsin were not guilty of violating Article 45 of the Public Officials Election and Recall Act, nor the Anti-Infiltration Act.

On 8 November 2026, Lin was detained for allegedly receiving funds from the CCP to run for the position of Tainan Ward Chief during the 2026 Taiwanese local elections. Another party member,Chen Zhen-zhou, was arrested for receiving foreign funds to run for Wuling Ward Chief in North District, Hsinchu; Chen was eventually released on bond.

== Ideology ==
The stated purpose of the Taiwan People's Communist Party is to "advocate modern socialism for economic development, adhere to the 1992 Consensus, and promote Cross-Strait peace." The party regards Taiwan as "a sacred part of China's territory", and commemorates annually the National Day of the People's Republic of China (PRC) by singing the PRC anthem and raising the PRC flag.

== See also ==
- Taiwan Democratic Communist Party
- United front in Taiwan
