= Labor Party (Taiwan) =

Left-wing political party in Taiwan

Labor Party 勞動黨
- Chairman: Wu Jung-yuan
- Vice Chairmen: Tang Shu; Wang Chuan-ping
- Honorary Chairman: Luo Mei-wen
- Founded: 29 March 1989
- Headquarters: 6th Floor, No. 25, Lane 344, Nanjing West Road, Datong District, Taipei
- Membership (2019): ~400
- Ideology: Socialism; Chinese unification; Anti-imperialism
- Political position: Left-wing
- National affiliation: Pro-Beijing camp
- International affiliation: International Communist Seminar (until 2014)
- Legislative Yuan: 0 / 113
- Municipal mayors: 0 / 6
- Magistrates / mayors: 0 / 16
- Councilors: 1 / 912
- Township / city mayors: 0 / 204

Party flag

Website
- laborparty.tw

Labor Party
- Traditional Chinese: 勞動黨
- Simplified Chinese: 劳动党
Transcriptions
Standard Mandarin
- Hanyu Pinyin: Láodòng Dǎng
Hakka
- Romanization: Lò-thung Tóng
Southern Min
- Hokkien POJ: Lô-tōng Tóng

The Labor Party (Note: In local languages: Traditional Chinese script: 勞動黨; Mandarin Pinyin: Láodòng Dǎng; Hokkien: Lô-tōng Tóng; Sixian Hakka: Lò-thung Tóng) is a left-wing, pro-Beijing political party in Taiwan, founded on 29 March 1989 by a striking trade union in Xinpu, Hsinchu County. It regards itself as part of the wider labor movement in Taiwan, and advocates for labor reforms and the redistribution of social resources under a centralised authority. The party also supports the unification of Taiwan and mainland China, with a high level of autonomy reserved for Taiwan under the "one country, two systems" principle of the People's Republic of China.

Party members often assist in unionizing workers and regularly hold protests against the government's labor policies, as well as perceived imperialism from the United States and Japan. Notable labor demonstrations that the Labor Party helped organize include the 2004 Yaowen Electric protests, 2004 Hsinta strike and 2009 labor dispute against TSMC.

== History ==
The Labor Party was founded on 29 March 1989 by unionized workers of the Far East Synthetic Fiber Company in Xinpu, Hsinchu County. The trade union had been protesting the company's mass layoffs and refusal to increase workers' wages; the protests culminated in the 1989 Far East Synthetic Fiber Company strike a month later. When establishing the party, the union leadership considered adopting the name "Taiwanese Communist Party" but elected not to do so due to the widespread anti-communism in Taiwan at the time.

In the years following its founding, the Labor Party grew in size and influence, with its membership consisting mainly of former political prisoners of the White Terror, labor movement organizers and the working class. The party, however, did not see electoral success until the 2009 local elections, when Labor Party candidate Kao Wei-kai was elected to the Hsinchu County Council. After Kao was elected, a majority of his monthly salary (NT$80,000) was put back into the party's treasury to fund future political activities.

In the 2018 local elections, Kao was reelected to the Hsinchu County Council, alongside Labor Party veteran Luo Mei-wen. The party won a total of two seats in the county council, representing the townships of Hukou and Xinpu.

The party received 0.05% of the votes in the 2024 Taiwanese legislative election.

== Ideology ==
The Labor Party regards itself as a socialist party and views itself as the ideological successor to the Taiwanese Communist Party. The party opposes the electoral system in Taiwan, calling it a bourgeois democracy, but participates in elections nonetheless.

The Labor Party opposes Taiwan independence and supports the unification of Taiwan and mainland China, under the government of the People's Republic of China and the "one country, two systems" principle.

== Election results ==
Labor Party local election results
Election	Number of popular votes	% of popular votes	Total elected seats	+/−
2009	4,736	0.11	1 / 587	1 ▲
2014	5,827 ▲	0.05 ▼	1 / 532	0
2018	10,247 ▲	0.08 ▲	2 / 912	1 ▲
2022	7,308 ▼	0.06 ▼	1 / 910	1 ▼

== Gallery ==
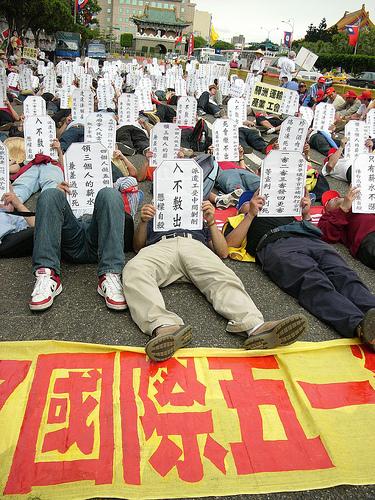
May Day protest by Labor Party members in 2007

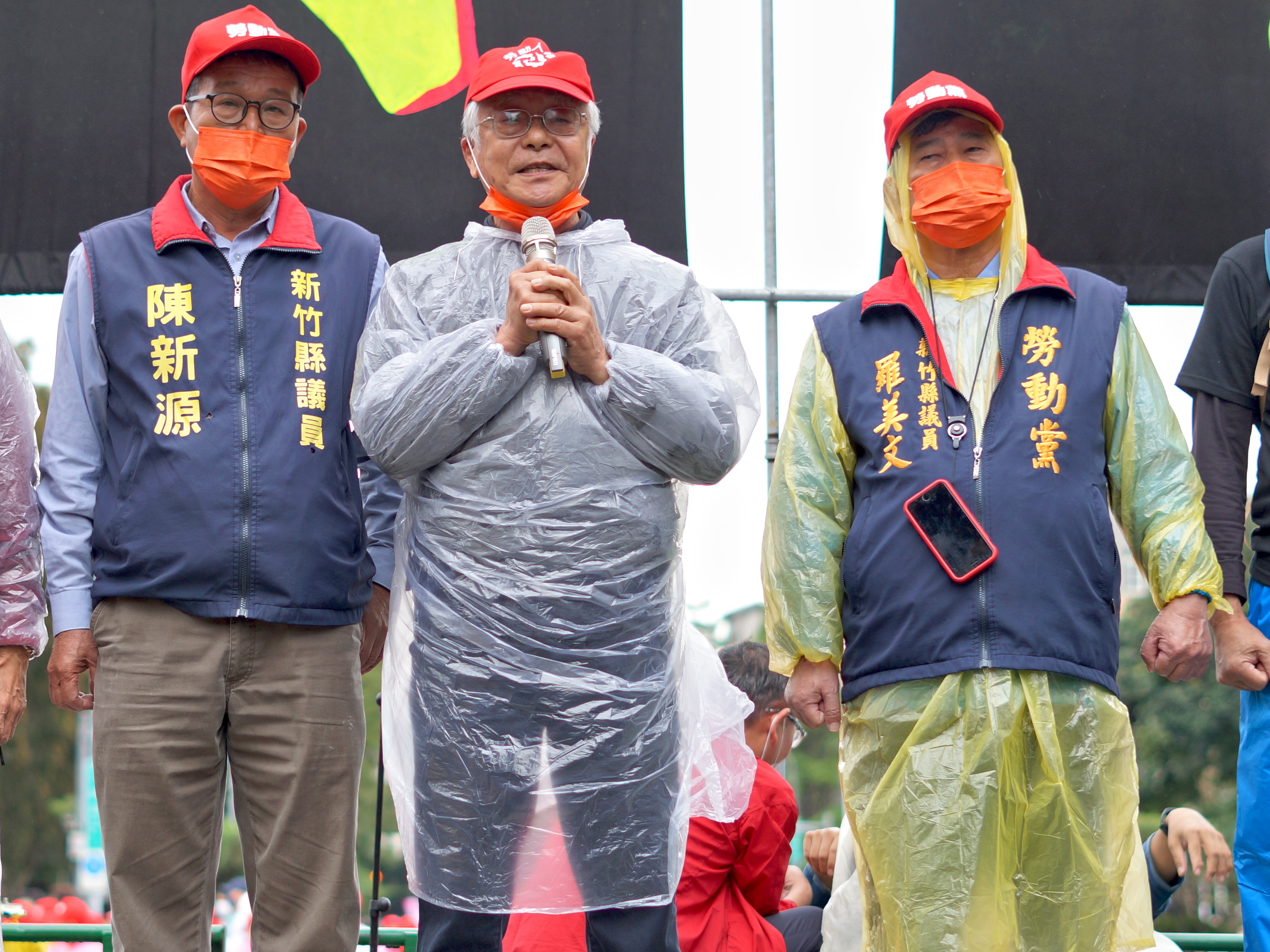
Prominent members of the Labor Party at a public rally on 12 December 2021. From left to right: Wu Jung-yuan, Chen Shin-yuan, and Luo Mei-wen

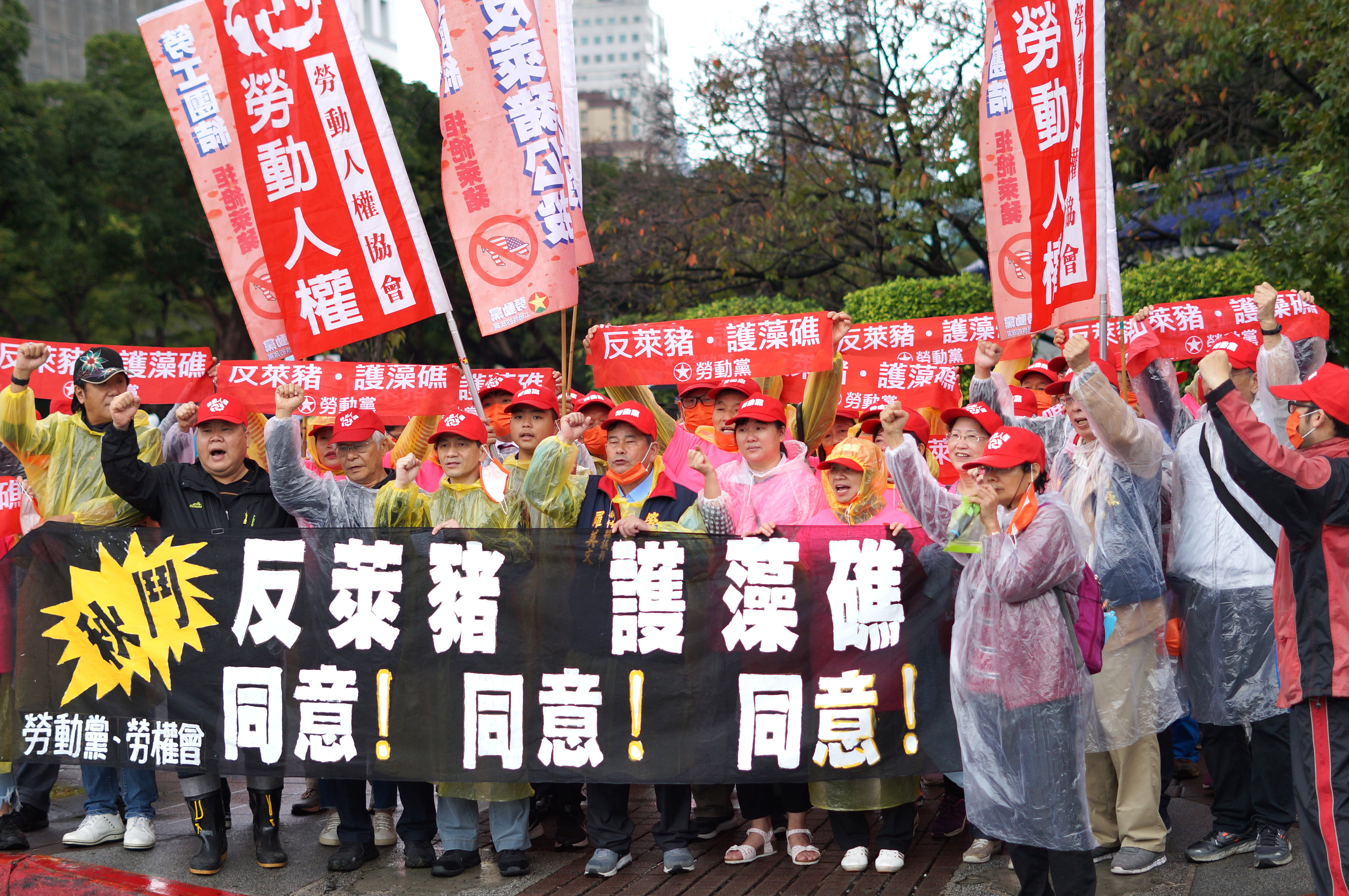
Labor Party protest in Taipei against pork imports from the United States, 12 December 2021

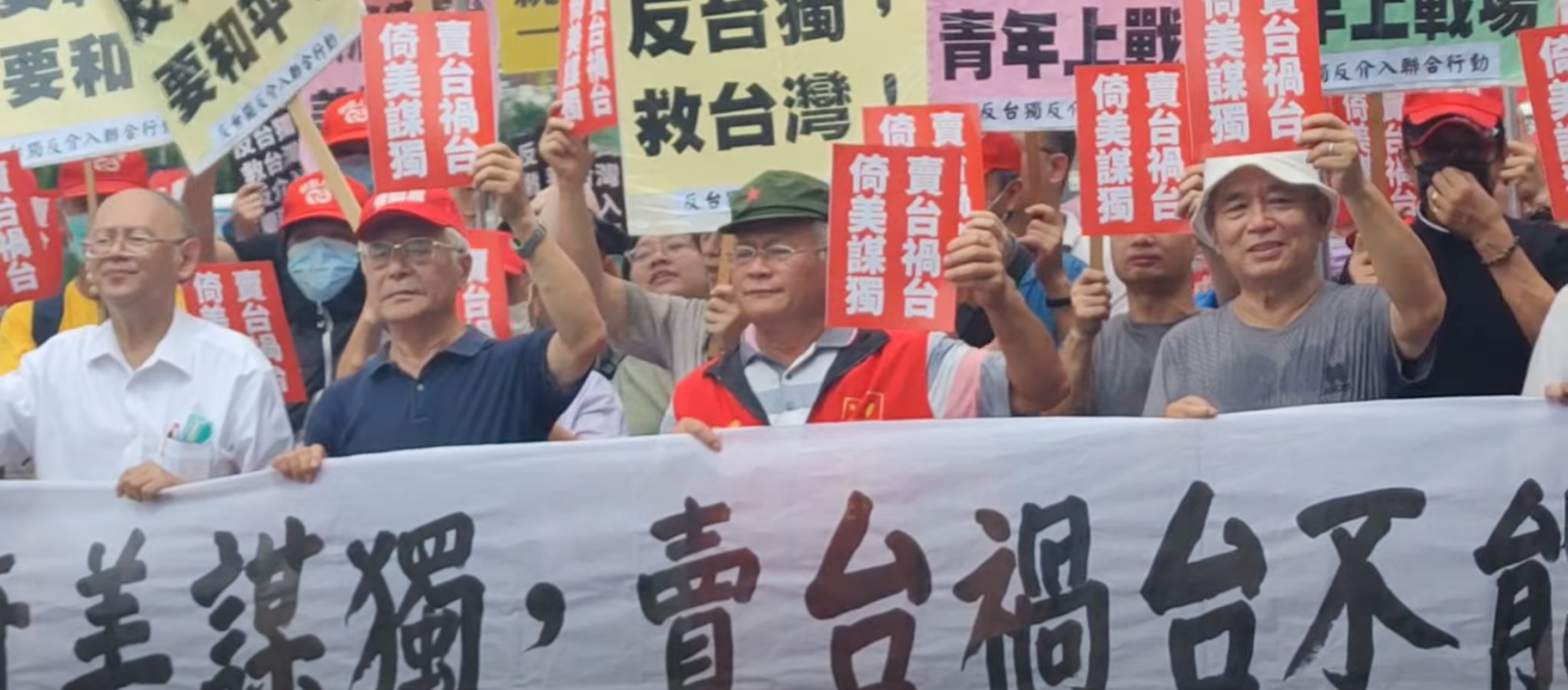
Labor Party protest in Taipei against Taiwanese independence and DPP presidential candidate Lai Ching-te, 11 August 2023
