= Kuo Lin-yung =

Taiwanese politician and lawyer

- 郭林勇
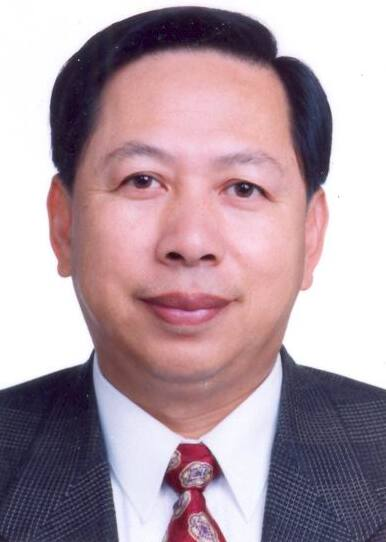
- Kuo during his tenure on the Sixth Legislative Yuan

Member of the Legislative Yuan
- In office 1 February 2005 – 31 January 2008
- Constituency: Republic of China
- In office 1 February 1984 – 31 January 1987
- Constituency: Taiwan 3rd Taichung City, Taichung County, Changhua, Nantou

Personal details
- Born: 20 November 1946 (age 79) Yuanlin, Changhua County, Taiwan, Republic of China
- Party: Taiwan Solidarity Union (from 2004)
- Other political affiliations: Kuomintang
- Education: National Chung Hsing University

Kuo Lin-yung (Chinese: 郭林勇; pinyin: Guō Línyǒng; born 20 November 1946), is a Taiwanese politician. During his first term on the Legislative Yuan from 1984 to 1987, he was affiliated with the Kuomintang. He returned to the legislature between 2005 and 2008, representing the Taiwan Solidarity Union. He is also a lawyer who has led the Taichung Bar Association and Taiwan Bar Association, and served as deputy minister of justice. In 2010, he was a member of the Referendum Review Committee convened by the Executive Yuan.

== Personal life and education ==
Kuo earned a law degree at National Chung Hsing University. He led the Taichung Bar Association, and later the Taiwan Bar Association. Kuo married a junior high school teacher. When she retired, she took an art class and was soon joined by Kuo. Kuo returned to painting in 1998 and jointly exhibited his works alongside his wife's for the first time in 2003.

== Political career ==
Kuo was elected to the first Legislative Yuan in 1983, representing the Kuomintang and the Taiwan 3rd district. He resumed the practice of law after losing the 1986 legislative election. During the 2004 presidential election, Kuo served as legal counsel for the Democratic Progressive Party. He represented the Taiwan Solidarity Union party list in the 2004 legislative election. In June 2005, Lin was selected one of four caucus whips for the TSU, serving alongside Ho Min-hao, David Huang, and George Liu. Party chairman Huang Chu-wen stepped down from the position in December 2004 and supported Kuo's candidacy for the leadership, who registered for the election later that month. Lee Teng-hui backed Shu Chin-chiang, who eventually was appointed party chairman in January 2005, Lin expressed dissatisfaction with the procedure. When the Ministry of Finance proposed an alternative minimum tax in 2005, Kuo stated that the proposal would not tax overseas income. Commenting on a People First Party bill to grant investigative powers to legislators, Kuo said that, while the Constitutional Court had ruled favorably on the legislature's investigative rights, such a bill should not violate constitutionally guaranteed separation of powers. While reviewing amendments to the Domestic Violence Prevention Law in 2006, Kuo opined that LGBT rights had been neglected up to that point, and cited the impact of the 2005 film Brokeback Mountain to improve protections. Alongside Hsiao Bi-khim, Kuo urged adherence to the Administrative Procedure Law, which stated that foreigners who were denied residency or deported from Taiwan should be provided a document explaining the reasoning for the decision. Later that year, Kuo commented on the judicial career of Cheng Chung-mo and urged respect for an independent Taiwanese judiciary. In 2007, Business Weekly magazine named him one of the top legislators in Taiwan. During the year, Kuo expressed support for Taiwan to apply for membership in intergovernmental organizations under the name Taiwan. He later criticized the Pan-Blue coalition for blocking a TSU bill regarding Kuomintang party assets. In June 2007, Kuo stated that the Taiwan Solidarity Union caucus would not support a no-confidence motion proposed by Chen Chin-te. However, Ker Chien-ming, Shyu Jong-shyong, and Kuo worked together to pass amendments to consumer debt clearance regulations. That same month, Costa Rica ended official bilateral relations with Taiwan, and Kuo questioned the Ministry of Foreign Affairs on initiatives to prevent other nations from ending diplomatic relations with Taiwan. The next month, the foreign ministry suggested a debt reduction plan for allies. Kuo stated that he would support the plan if it did not cancel the debt, but instead focused on extending the repayment period. In August 2007, the French government detained and searched two Taiwanese citizens because they provided two differently designed Taiwan passports as identification. The cover of one indicated "Taiwan," while the other lacked that designation. The "Taiwan" design was introduced to distinguish its holders from People's Republic of China citizens. In light of the incident, Kuo urged the Kuomintang not to oppose the newer designs.

After stepping down from the Legislative Yuan at the end of his second term in 2008, Kuo succeeded Lee Chin-yung as deputy minister of justice. After Liu Cheng-hung suggested that townships that had 75 percent or higher turnout in the 2008 presidential election be rewarded with NT$1 million in construction funds, Kuo stated that encouraging high turnout was legal, but suggesting support for a specific candidate was not. In 2010, Kuo served on the Executive Yuan's Referendum Review Committee. As a committee member, he voted for a TSU-proposed referendum question: "Do you agree that the government should sign an ECFA with China?" The committee as a whole voted against the referendum proposal, 12–4 in June 2010, and again, 10–2, in August 2010.
