= Huang Jun-ying =

Taiwanese academic (1941–2014)

- 黃俊英

Minister without Portfolio of the 11th Examination Yuan
- In office September 1, 2008 – January 10, 2014
- President: Wu Jin-lin (acting); John Kuan

Personal details
- Born: December 31, 1941 Kaohsiung, Takao Prefecture
- Died: January 10, 2014 (aged 72) Kaohsiung, Taiwan
- Party: Kuomintang
- Education: National Taiwan University (BA); National Chengchi University (MA); Michigan State University (MBA); University of Iowa (PhD)
- Scientific career
- Fields: Business administration
- Thesis: A Laboratory Study of Some Problems Involved in the Use of Nonmetric Multidimensional Scaling for Prediction Decisions in Marketing (1974)
- Doctoral advisor: David J. Curry

Huang Jun-ying (Chinese: 黃俊英; December 31, 1941 – January 10, 2014) was a Taiwanese academic and business administration professor. He served as a minister without portfolio in the Examination Yuan from 2008 to 2014.

After earning his doctorate from the University of Iowa, Huang was a professor of management at I-Shou University and served as the deputy mayor of Kaohsiung. In 2002 and 2006, he was nominated twice by the Kuomintang to run for the Kaohsiung mayoralty. However, he was defeated by Frank Hsieh, who was seeking re-election in 2002, by more than 20,000 votes, and by Chen Chu, the former chairman of the Labor Committee, in 2006 by only 1,114 votes.

== Early life and education ==
Huang was born on December 31, 1941, in Lingya Liao (now Lingya District) in Kaohsiung City, Takao Prefecture, during the Japanese rule of Taiwan.

After high school, Huang graduated from National Taiwan University with a bachelor's degree in commerce in 1964 and earned a master's degree in business administration from National Chengchi University in 1968. He then completed graduate studies in the United States, where he earned a Master of Business Administration (M.B.A.) from Michigan State University in 1970 and his Ph.D. in business administration from the University of Iowa in 1974 under professor David J. Curry. His doctoral dissertation was titled, "A Laboratory Study of Some Problems Involved in the Use of Nonmetric Multidimensional Scaling for Prediction Decisions in Marketing".

== Academic career ==
In 1987, Huang became the dean and provost of the School of Management of National Sun Yat-sen University.

== Political career ==
In 1995, he was chosen to serve as the deputy mayor of Kaohsiung City.

At the end of 2002, Huang Jun-ying was nominated by the Kuomintang to run for mayor of Kaohsiung City in the 2001–02 Taiwanese local elections. However, he lost to incumbent mayor and Democratic Progressive Party candidate Frank Hsieh by less than 30,000 votes.

Results of the third Kaohsiung City Mayoral election

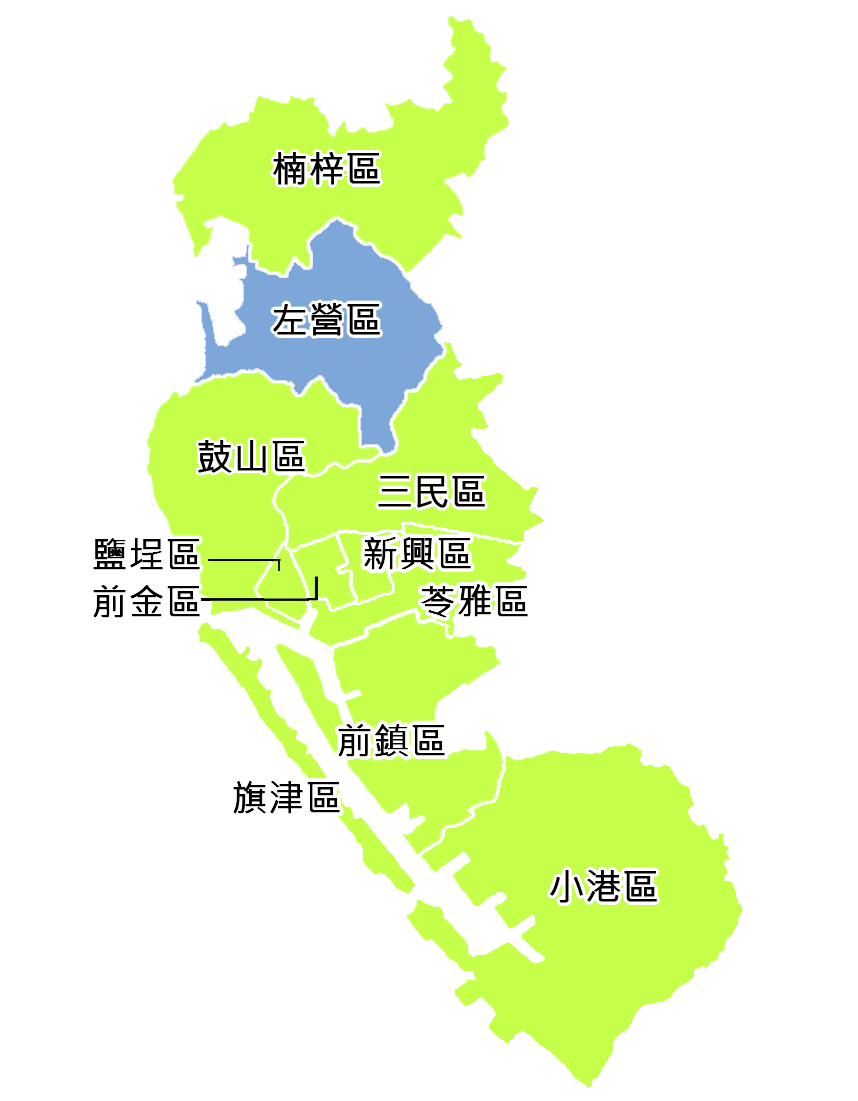
2002 Kaohsiung City Mayoral election results Frank Hsieh leading but with less than 60% of the vote Huang Jun-ying leading but with less than 60% of the vote

In the Kaohsiung City Mayoral election, Frank Hsieh, nominee of the Democratic Progressive Party, was re-elected as mayor with a lead of nearly 25,000 votes.

2002 Mayor of Kaohsiung election results
No.	Candidate	Party	Votes	Percentage	Elected
1	Shih Ming-teh	Independent politician	8,750	1.13%	
2	Chang Po-ya	Independent politician	13,512	1.75%	
3	Huang Tien-sheng	Independent politician	1,998	0.26%	
4	Huang Jun-ying	Kuomintang	361,546	46.82%	
5	Frank Hsieh	Democratic Progressive Party	386,384	50.04%	
Number of voters			1,092,668		
Number of votes			779,911		
Valid ticket			772,157		
Invalid vote			7,754		
Voter Turnout			71.38%		

At the end of 2006, Huang Junying was once again nominated by the Chinese Kuomintang to participate in the Kaohsiung City mayoral election, but ultimately lost to Chen Ju, who ran on behalf of the Democratic Progressive Party by a slight margin of 1,114 votes.

Results of the fourth Kaohsiung City Mayoral Election

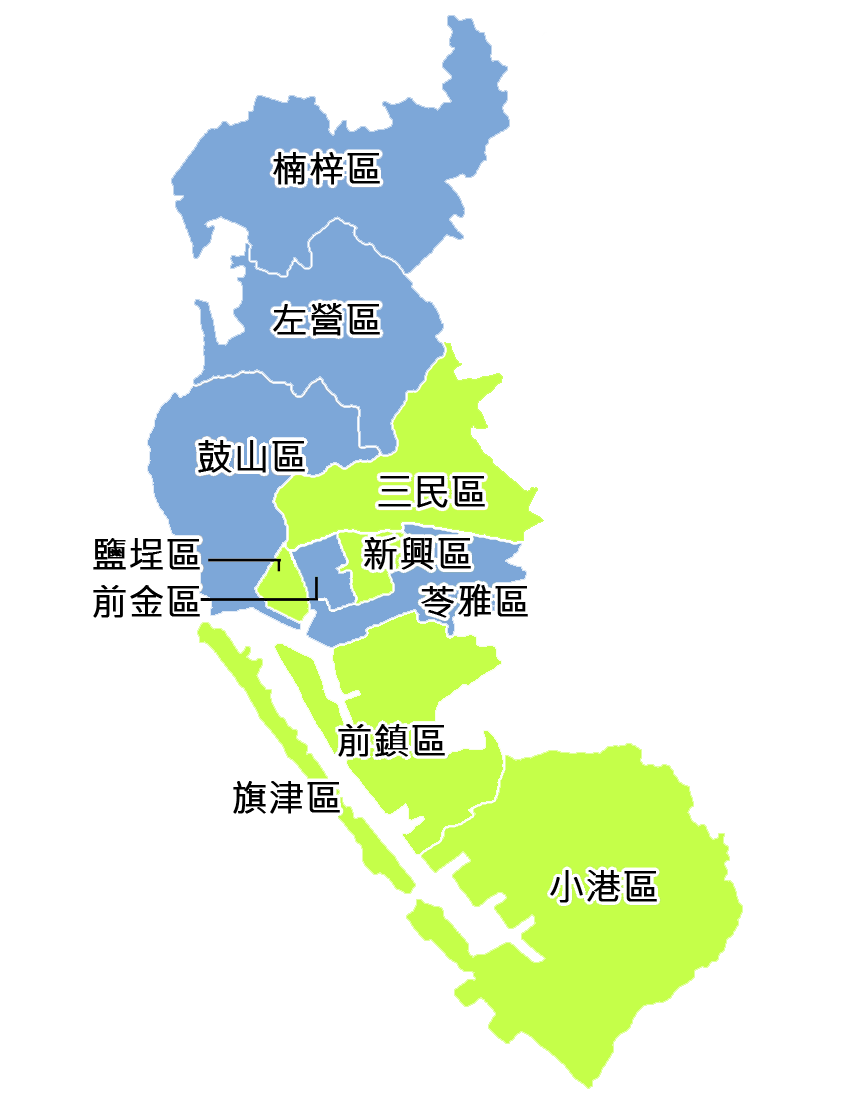
2006 Kaohsiung City Mayoral election result Chen Chu leading but with less than 60% of the vote Huang Jun-ying leading but with less than 60% of the vote

This election is extremely tight as the two parties are evenly matched in strength. Chen Chu narrowly won with 1,114 votes (less than 0.2%).

No.	Party	Candidate	Votes	Percentage	Elected
1	Kuomintang	Huang Jun-ying	378,303	49.27%	
2	Taiwan Defense Alliance	Lin Chih-sheng	1,746	0.23%	
3	Taiwan Solidarity Union	Lo Chih-ming	6,599	0.86%	
4	Independent politician	Lin Ching-yuan	1,803	0.23%	
5	Democratic Progressive Party	Chen Chu	379,417	49.41%	

=== "Walking workers" scandal ===
The court ruled that the defendant Gu Zinmo, nicknamed "Gu Yi", helped mobilize and distributed bribes together with Cai Nengxiang, nicknamed "Black Pine". They were sentenced to 3 years and 6 months in prison and 9 months in prison respectively.

The final communication records were not found to be related to Huang, which dispelled the "conspiracy theory".

On the night before the election, Chen Chu's camp held a press conference with the title: "Huang Jun-ying was caught bribing the election". Huang Jun-ying was dissatisfied and sued for violating the election and recall law and the criminal law and aggravated defamation. The prosecutor ruled that the defendants Chen Chu, Kuan Bi-ling, Xiao Yuzheng and Chen Chi-mai would not be prosecuted.

After Huang Jun-ying's defeat, Apollo Chen, spokesman for Huang Jun-ying's campaign team, addressed directly to Chen Ju through press conferences and political commentary programs, saying "If the law proves that Huang Jun-ying is innocent, Chen Ju, do you dare to re-elect?" Chen Chu's campaign headquarters said it would respect judicial investigations.

=== "Election invalid" lawsuit ===
On June 15, 2007, the Kaohsiung District Court issued a first-instance verdict. Chen Chu was ruled to be "invalid for election", but the case for "invalid election" was dismissed. After the verdict of the first trial, both Huang Jun-ying and Chen Ju lodged appeals, on the grounds of the dismissed "invalid election" and the charge of "invalid for election" respectively.

After the second trial, the Kaohsiung branch of the High Court reversed the verdict. It overturned the first trial verdict that the election of Chen Chu was invalid and changed the verdict to be valid.

Huang Jun-ying expressed that he respects judicial decisions and will serve as a political volunteer to assist in the election of party legislators and presidential candidates to win the election.

=== Member of Examination Yuan ===
On June 19, 2008, President Ma Ying-jeou nominated Huang Jun-ying to serve as a member of the 11th Examination Yuan, as a member specialized in business. After the Legislative Yuan approved the nomination, he took office on September 1, 2008.

== Personal life ==
On January 10, 2014, Huang died of lung adenocarcinoma at his home in Kaohsiung on January 10, 2014, while serving as a member of Examination Yuan.
