= George Liu =

Taiwanese-American politician and diplomat

- 劉寬平
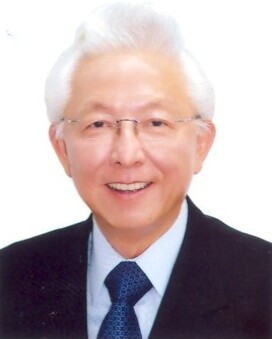

ROC Representative to Switzerland
- In office 15 November 2007 – 16 August 2008
- Preceded by: Rex Wang
- Succeeded by: Hsieh Fa-dah

Member of the Legislative Yuan
- In office 1 February 2005 – 15 October 2007
- Constituency: Overseas Chinese

Personal details
- Born: 20 June 1935 (age 90) Tainan Prefecture, Taiwan, Empire of Japan
- Party: Taiwan Solidarity Union (until 2008)
- Education: University of Pittsburgh (MA)

George Liu Kuan-ping (Chinese: 劉寬平; born 20 June 1935) is a Taiwanese-American former politician and diplomat. He was a member of Taiwan's Legislative Yuan from 2005 to 2007, and served as Taiwan's representative to Switzerland from 2007 to 2008. After his resignation from the latter position, Liu was found to have held United States citizenship during his political career in Taiwan.

== Early life and education ==
Liu was raised in Tainan. His father was a physician. Liu moved to the United States and earned a master's degree in international administration from the University of Pittsburgh Graduate School of Public and International Affairs.

== Political and diplomatic career ==
Liu served on the standing committee of the Formosan Association for Public Affairs. In the 2004 Taiwanese legislative election, Liu was elected to represent overseas Chinese on behalf of the Taiwan Solidarity Union. While serving on the Legislative Yuan, Liu remained affiliated with FAPA. As a sitting legislator, Liu advocated for Taiwanese participation within the World Health Organization, stating in 2005, "Health issues are more important than trade. Looking back at the SARS situation in 2003, without Taiwan's aggressive actions, the epidemic might not have been contained," and traveled to Washington, D.C. in 2007 in continued support for the cause, declaring "This is not a political issue but an issue of human rights." He also attended the 2007 Taiwan Transatlantic Dialogue and backed Taiwanese involvement in other intergovernmental organizations such as the United Nations.

In June 2005, Liu began serving as one of four caucus whips for the Taiwan Solidarity Union, alongside Ho Min-hao, David Huang and Kuo Lin-yung. In August 2006, Liu expressed support for Taiwan's capital to move from Taipei to a more southerly location, viewing such a move as an assertion of sovereignty. Liu attended a fundraising event in January 2007, during which the Taiwan Association of University Professors announced that it was founding an online college. Liu's final day as a member of the Legislative Yuan was 15 October 2007, and the Central Election Commission retroactively annulled his election to office because he held United States citizenship during his term. Questions regarding dual citizenship were also asked of Liu's former legislative colleague Diane Lee, who eventually resigned her seat.

Liu was appointed Taiwan's representative to Switzerland in November 2007, and began the process of relinquishing United States citizenship that year, but by June 2008, had not yet lost his dual citizenship status. Liu, who arrived in Switzerland to assume the position in February 2008, offered his resignation in June and submitted a formal resignation letter in late July, which was approved on 16 August. As Liu was stepping down, the Ministry of Foreign Affairs determined that he had displayed a lack of political judgment in delaying a letter from Switzerland's Federal Department of Justice and Police in regard to inquires about money laundering by the Chen Shui-bian family. Although his resignation had been approved by the Executive Yuan, the foreign affairs ministry also started an investigation into Liu for possible dereliction of duty. The investigation was turned over to the Control Yuan, which passed a resolution to impeach Liu for dereliction of duty on 30 September 2008. The Central Executive Committee of the Taiwan Solidarity Union reached a decision to expel Liu from the party on 13 October 2008. Governmental spokespeople separately asserted that Liu was the only political appointee within the Ministry of Foreign Affairs to hold dual citizenship, and that he was one of two officeholders within the Ma Ying-jeou presidential administration with dual citizenship. An investigation into Liu's citizenship status continued into 2009. On 22 May 2009, Taiwan's Central Election Commission determined that Liu had not renounced his American citizenship prior to contesting the 2004 legislative election, in contravention of the Civil Servants Election and Recall Act, and retroactively annulled his election to that office.
