= 2005–06 Taiwanese local elections =

- 3 December 2005 – 30 December 2006 (Note: 2005-12-03: magistrates of counties and mayors of cities, councillors in county/city councils, and mayors of township/cities; 2006-06-10: representatives in township/city councils and villages chiefs (all except in Taipei City); 2006-12-09: mayors and councillors of special municipalities; 2006-12-30: village chiefs in Taipei City)

25 magistrates/mayors and others (Note: 997 councillors; 319 township/city mayors; 3,654 township/city council representatives; 7,824 village chiefs; Figures in this infobox are for magistrate/mayor elections unless otherwise noted. Special municipalities are counted with counties/cities despite being counted separately in official statistics)
- Registered: 16,793,623
- Turnout: 66.13% ▼1.17 pp
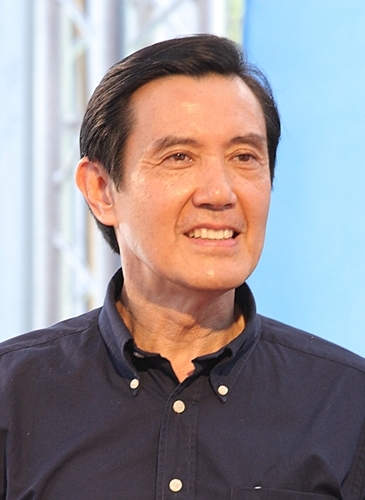

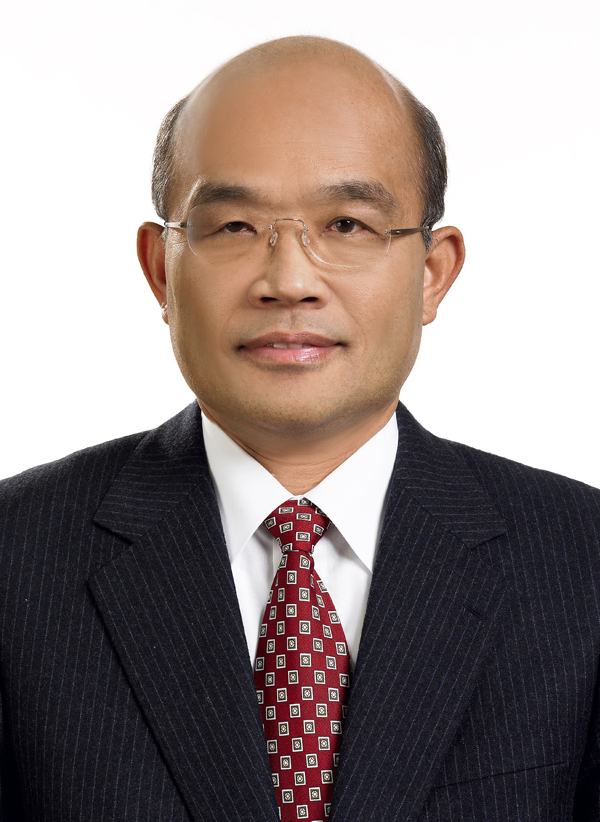

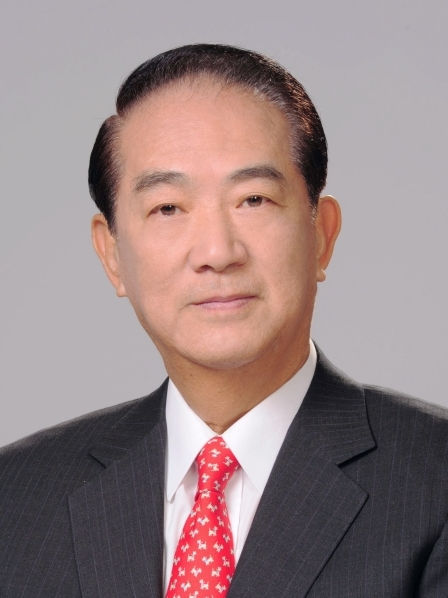

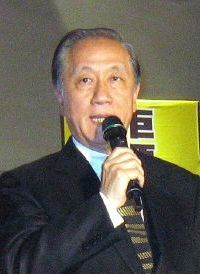
	First party	Second party
Leader	Ma Ying-jeou	Su Tseng-chang
Party	KMT	DPP
Leader since	27 July 2005	21 July 2002
Last election	10 seats, 39.75%	10 seats, 44.40%
Seats won	15	7
Seat change	▲5	▼3
Popular vote	5,594,163	4,629,576
Percentage	51.18%	42.35%
Swing	▲11.43 pp	▼2.05 pp
Councillors	450	225
Township/city mayors	173	35
	Third party	Fourth party
Leader	James Soong	Yok Mu-ming
Party	People First	New
Leader since	31 March 2000	1 June 2003
Last election	2 seats, 1.88%	1 seat, 7.93%
Seats won	1	1
Seat change	▼1	Steady
Popular vote	98,964	17,358
Percentage	0.91%	0.16%
Swing	▼0.97 pp	▼7.77 pp
Councillors	37	6
Township/city mayors	3	0
- Elected magistrate/mayor party by seat

Local elections were held in Taiwan on 3 December 2005 to elect magistrates of counties and mayors of cities, councillors in county/city councils and mayors of townships and cities, known as the three-in-one elections (Chinese: 三合一選舉), on 10 June 2006 to elect representatives in township/city councils and village chiefs (all except in Taipei City), on 9 December 2006 to elect mayors and councillors of special municipalities, and on 30 December 2006 to elect village chiefs in Taipei City.

The largest opposition party Kuomintang (KMT) replaced the governing Democratic Progressive Party (DPP) as the largest party at the local level. Kuomintang, together with other smaller parties in opposition, won control of 16 of the 23 counties and province-administered cities, most of the city and county councils, as well as most of the townships, towns and county-administered cities.

The party chairman of DPP Su Tseng-chang resigned following his promise on the eve of the elections. Premier Frank Hsieh has also submitted his resignation to President Chen Shui-bian, but Chen has stated that he does not plan to accept Hsieh's resignation. Hsieh finally resigned in 2006 and Su replaced him. Chairman Ma Ying-jeou pledged to resign if the KMT failed to win at least 11 of the magistrate and mayor positions and the results were considered a sign of confidence of Ma's leadership reinforced his position in the bid for the presidency in the 2008 presidential election.

== Background ==
The election was seen as a litmus test for the governing Democratic Progressive Party and the incumbent President Chen Shui-bian in the wake of damaging scandals affecting their image. It was also a test for the popularity of the leading opposition party Kuomintang, which Taipei mayor Ma Ying-jeou assumed the chairmanship of in August 2005.

In the months preceding the election the DPP was plagued by a rising unemployment rate and a series of scandals involving the Kaohsiung Mass Rapid Transit system, stock speculations by two deputy presidential secretaries-general, and "stock market vultures" profiting from insider information. DPP candidates in Taipei County and Ilan County were implicated in vote buying scandals. Publicized scandals concerning several KMT candidates failed to cause similar damage, in part because the DPP had built a reputation on its desire for reform, had the most to lose by the taint of corruption.

DPP planned to discontinue the current 18% pension interest rate for civil servants also backfired on the party. The pension reform plan had been put forward by the Chen administration as a way to stop a drain on the national treasury caused by paying a favored interest rate to long-term KMT officials who had worked relatively short stints in actual public government. Prominent beneficiaries of the high interest rate included KMT honor chairman Lien Chan and current Taichung mayor Jason Hu. The announcement of the reform plan cost the DPP a huge loss of support among civil service employees without the party winning offsetting increases in support from other segments of society.

== County/city elections ==
On 3 December 2005, 76 candidates competed for the positions as mayors or magistrates of the 23 provincial cities and counties, 1,690 competed for membership in the city or county councils, and 1786 for the 319 leadership for townships and county-administered cities.

Of the 23 county and city government positions, the Kuomintang won 14 posts, and its Pan-Blue Coalition allies the People First Party and the New Party each won one post. In contrast, the Democratic Progressive Party won only six posts. One post was won by an independent. Overall, the KMT garnered 50.96% of the vote, up from 35.06% in 2001. The DPP won 41.95% of the vote, down from 45.27% in 2001. The PFP and the Taiwan Solidarity Union each won about 1.1% of the votes, but the TSU did not win any posts. The New Party won 0.2% of votes. Independents won 4.65%.

In the 319 township governments at stake, the KMT won 173 posts and the PFP won three, while the DPP won 35 and independents took the remaining 108.

Heavily contested races included the Taipei County and Yilan County magistrate elections. In Taipei, DPP candidate Luo Wen-jia lost by a surprisingly large margin of 190,000 votes over KMT candidate Legislator Chou Hsi-wei, who had previously been with the PFP but left the PFP in favor of the KMT in order to receive the KMT nomination. In Yilan, KMT candidate Lu Kuo-hua won by only 8,000 votes over DPP candidate Chen Ding-nan, gaining control of the traditionally pro-DPP stronghold for the first time in 24 years. Both Luo and Chen had been plagued by allegations of vote buying. In Chiayi City, which had long been controlled by the independent Hsu clan, the KMT candidate won in a tight race against a DPP-backed former secretary of clan matriarch Hsu Shih-hsien, after current clan leader Chang Po-ya withdrew her endorsement for the DPP over perceived insults by a DPP legislator against the Hsu clan.

KMT also took Keelung City, Taoyuan County, Hualien County, Penghu County, Nantou County, Changhua County, Taichung County, Taichung City, Miaoli County, Hsinchu County, and Hsinchu City.

DPP won six constituencies, all in its traditional southern stronghold: Tainan County, Tainan City, Kaohsiung County, Pingtung County, Yunlin County, and Chiayi County. However, the Tainan County and Pingtung County victories were far closer than originally expected.

PFP and the New Party retained control in Lienchang County and Kinmen County respectively, both outlying islands to the coast of mainland Fujian that have been strongly pro-unification and anti-independence.

In Taitung County, independent Wu Chun-li, a former KMT member, won against two other independents. However, he was disqualified one day after inauguration on 20 December 2005 due to a corruption conviction that led him to be purged from the KMT. Lai Shun-hsien took over the position as acting Magistrate of Taitung County starting 21 December 2005 until 17 April 2006 when his successor Kuang Li-chen was elected to the magistrate office.

Voter turnout was around 66%.

=== Magistrate/mayor elections ===
Taiwanese county magistrates and city mayoral elections, 2005
County/ City	Winning candidate	Party
Changhua County	Cho Po-yuan	Kuomintang
Chiayi City	Huang Min-hui	Kuomintang
Chiayi County	Chen Ming-wen	Democratic Progressive Party
Hsinchu City	Lin Junq-tzer	Kuomintang
Hsinchu County	Cheng Yung-chin	Kuomintang
Hualien County	Hsieh Shen-shan	Kuomintang
Kaohsiung County	Yang Chiu-hsing	Democratic Progressive Party
Keelung City	Hsu Tsai-li	Kuomintang
Kinmen County	Lee Chu-feng	New Party
Lienchiang County	Chen Hsueh-sheng	People First Party
Miaoli County	Liu Cheng-hung	Kuomintang
Nantou County	Lee Chao-ching	Kuomintang
Penghu County	Wang Chien-fa	Kuomintang
Pingtung County	Tsao Chi-hung	Democratic Progressive Party
Taichung City	Jason Hu	Kuomintang
Taichung County	Huang Chung-sheng	Kuomintang
Tainan City	Hsu Tain-tsair	Democratic Progressive Party
Tainan County	Su Huan-chih	Democratic Progressive Party
Taipei County	Chou Hsi-wei	Kuomintang
Taitung County	Wu Chun-li	Independent
Taoyuan County	Eric Chu	Kuomintang
Yilan County	Lu Kuo-hua	Kuomintang
Yunlin County	Su Chih-fen	Democratic Progressive Party

== Municipal elections ==
Municipal elections were held on 9 December 2006.

=== Taipei Mayoral Elections ===
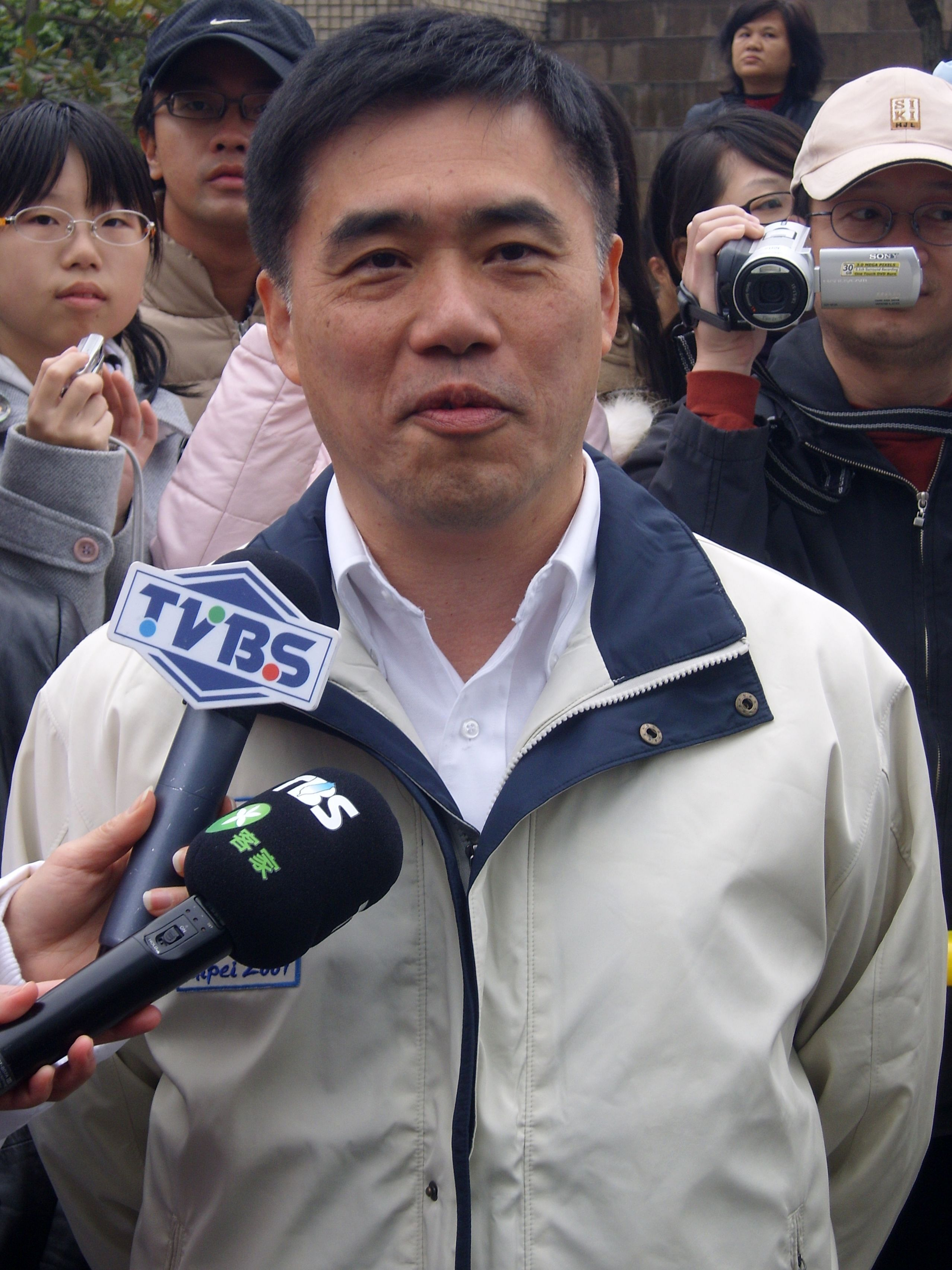
Hau Lung-pin, nominated by the KMT, elected as the Mayor of the Taipei City.

No	Candidate	Party	Votes	%
1	Li Ao		7,795	0.61%
2	Clara Chou (Note: Despite Chou's expulsion from the Taiwan Solidarity Union on November 9, 2006, the party could not withdraw their recommendation for Chou under Taiwan's Public Officials Election and Recall Law. She would still contest the elections as a TSU candidate.)		3,372	0.26%
3	Frank Hsieh		525,869	40.89%
4	James Soong (Note: James Soong was Chairman of the People's First Party at the time of the elections, but entered the elections as an independent.)		53,281	4.14%
5	Hau Lung-pin		692,085	53.81%
6	Ke Tsi-hai		3,687	0.29%

Hau Lung-pin of the opposition party Kuomintang was elected Mayor of Taipei City, defeating the main opponent, Frank Hsieh of the governing Democratic Progressive Party.

=== Taipei City Councillors Elections ===
Party	Seats	Votes	%
Kuomintang	24	555,480	43.65%
Democratic Progressive Party	18	391,674	30.77%
Chinese New Party	4	74,752	5.87%
People First Party	2	88,852	6.98%
Taiwan Solidarity Union	2	65,197	5.12%
Green Party	-	5,381	0.42%
Non-Partisan Solidarity Union	-	197	0.02%
Chinese People's Party	-	416	0.03%
Independent or others	2	90,908	7.14%
Total	52	1,272,857	100%

=== Kaohsiung City Mayoral Elections ===
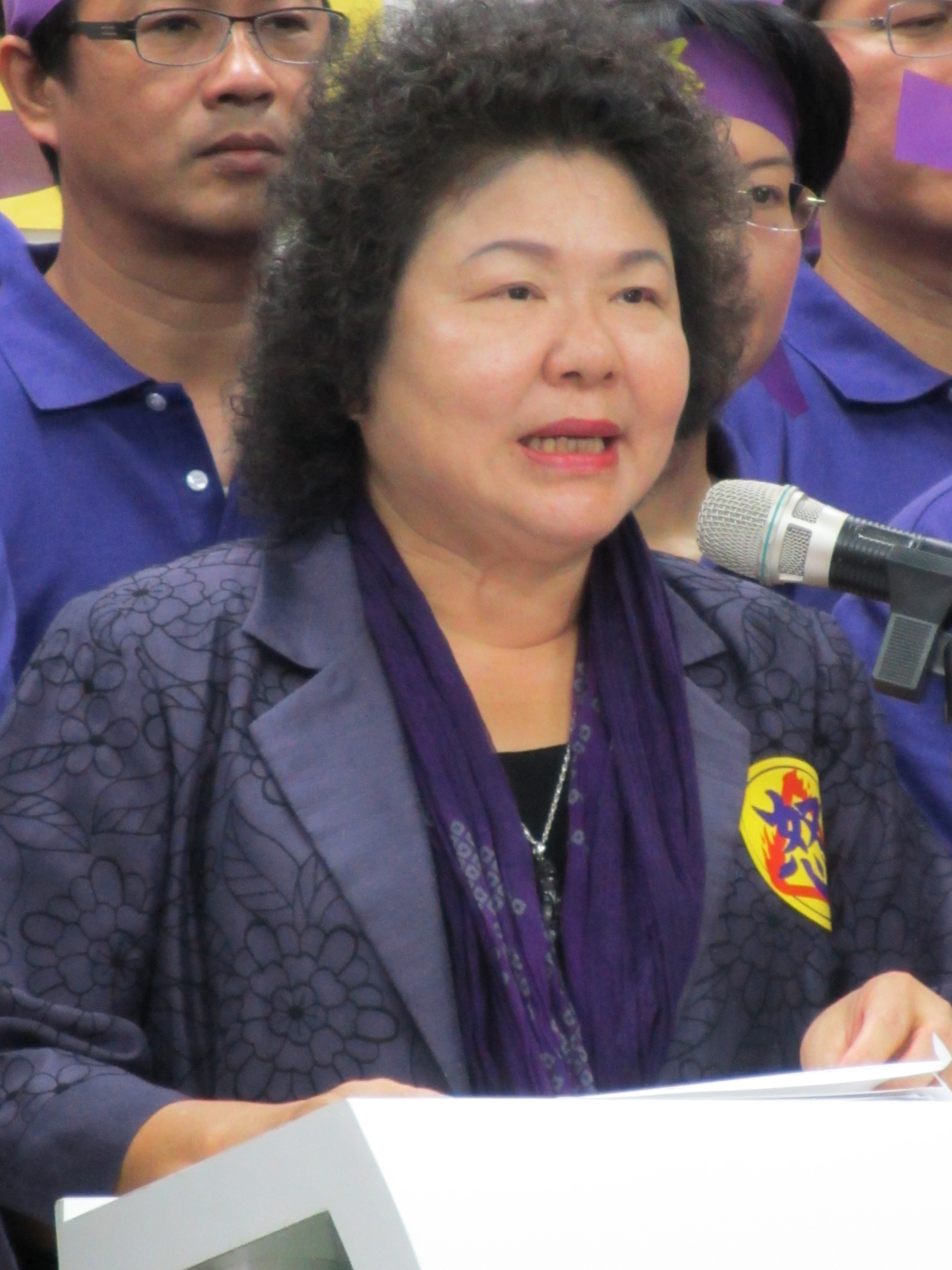
Chen Chu, nominated by the DPP, elected as the Mayor of the Kaohsiung City.

No	Candidate	Party	Votes	%
1	Huang Jun-ying		378,303	49.27%
2	Lin Chi-sheng 林志昇		1,746	0.23%
3	Lo Chih-ming		6,599	0.86%
4	Lin Ching-yuan 林景元		1,803	0.23%
5	Chen Chu		379,417	49.41%

Chen Chu of DPP was elected mayor of Kaohsiung, defeating the Kuomintang's Huang Jun-ying.

Huang contested the result, claiming that there had been voting irregularities and Chen had violated election law by holding press conferences and rallies well after the lawful time limit, and attacked him during this time period with unconfirmed information. Huang also filed the twin "Annulment of Election Result" and "Annulment of Election" lawsuits with Kaohsiung District Court on the same day Chen was proclaimed Mayor-Elected. Subsequently, the court ordered a complete recount of the votes, starting on 12 March 2007 and completed six days later on 18 March. The result of the recount would be used as evidences in the lawsuits.

On 15 June, the Kaohsiung District Court reached the decision to annulled the results of the Kaohsiung City Mayor Election, while dismissing the "Annulment of Election" lawsuit. Chen had since filed the appeal to the decision of "Annulment of Election Result", while Huang also filed the appeal to the decision of "Annulment of Election" lawsuit. On 16 November 2007, the High Court overturned the earlier decision and validated Chen's election victory, which was a final decision that could not be further appealed.

=== Kaohsiung City Councillors Elections ===
Party	Seats	Votes	%
Kuomintang	17	272,785	35.95%
Democratic Progressive Party	15	231,417	30.49%
Chinese New Party	-	233	0.03%
People First Party	4	51,475	6.78%
Taiwan Solidarity Union	1	43,564	5.74%
Taiwan Jianguo Union (台灣建國聯盟)	-	6,915	0.91%
Taiwan Defense Alliance	-	2,397	0.32%
Independent or others	7	150,125	19.78%
Total	44	758,911	100%

== Aftermath ==
Su Tseng-chang resigned as DPP chairman soon after election results were announced. Su had pledged to step down if the DPP lost either Taipei County or failed to win 10 of the 23 mayor/magistrate positions. Vice President Annette Lu was appointed acting DPP leader. Presidential Office Secretary-General Yu Shyi-kun was elected in a three-way race against legislator Chai Trong-rong and Wong Chin-chu with 54.4% of the vote.

Premier Frank Hsieh, DPP election organizer and former mayor of Kaohsiung (the city at the center of the MRT scandal) twice tendered a verbal resignation immediately following the election, but his resignation was not accepted by President Chen until January 17, 2006 after the DPP chairmanship election had concluded. The former DPP Chairman Su Tseng-chang was appointed to replace Hsieh as premier. Hsieh and his cabinet resigned en masse on January 24 to make way for Su and his new cabinet. President Chen had offered the position of Presidential Office Secretary-General (vacated by Yu) to the departing premier, but Hsieh refused and left office criticizing President Chen for his tough line stance on dealing with the PRC.

Newly elected KMT chairman Ma Ying-jeou saw his political fortunes bolstered by his party's election success. He had already successfully distanced himself from his predecessor, Lien Chan. Ma had declined to accompany Lien on his visit to mainland China earlier in the year and, as chairman, has appointed fresh faces to a number of party posts. He has now linked his name with the cause of clean government, a prominent KMT 2005 campaign pledge. The election is thus widely read as an expression of voter confidence in Ma's ability to achieve reform within his own party as well as in government. Ma has emerged as an early favorite in the 2008 presidential race.

The PFP's failure to win outside Matsu County has put additional pressure on PFP chairman James Soong to discuss merging the PFP with the KMT. The PFP lost its control of Taitung County to an independent. It also faced a defection in Taipei County where Chou Hsi-wei left the PFP to gain the KMT nomination.

In light of a controversial campaign tactic by DPP legislator Lin Chin-hsin (林進興), a physician, to publicize purported health records of KMT candidate Jason Hu (who won reelection as Taichung mayor), Lin and the other 11 physicians who participated in Lin's press conference have been disciplined by the Taichung City Department of Health. Lin's license was suspended for one year, while one of the physicians who organized the press conference as well, Kao Chia-chun (高嘉君) was suspended for one month. The other physicians received reprimands and mandatory ethics reeducation requirements. Lin, claiming both that the punishment was too severe and that since he practices in Kaohsiung, the Taichung authorities have no jurisdiction, has said that he will appeal the punishment.

== See also ==
- Elections in Taiwan
