= Yeh Yao-peng =

Taiwanese politician (born 1942)

- 葉耀鵬
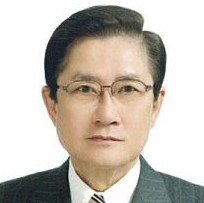

Member of the Control Yuan
- In office 1 December 2008 – 31 July 2014
- In office 1 September 1996 – 31 January 1999

Member of the National Assembly
- In office 26 May 2005 – 7 June 2005

Member of the Legislative Yuan
- In office 1 February 1993 – 30 October 1995
- Succeeded by: Chu Sheng-hao
- Constituency: Republic of China

Personal details
- Born: 3 October 1942 (age 83) Heitō, Taiwan, Empire of Japan (today Pingtung County, Taiwan)
- Party: Independent
- Other political affiliations: Democratic Progressive Party (until 1995); People First Party (2005)

Yeh Yao-peng (traditional Chinese: 葉耀鵬; simplified Chinese: 叶耀鹏; pinyin: Yè Yàopéng; born 3 October 1942) is a Taiwanese politician. He was a member of the Legislative Yuan, served on National Assembly, and was twice appointed to the Control Yuan.

== Political career ==
Yeh was elected to the Legislative Yuan in 1992, and stepped down in 1995 upon leaving the Democratic Progressive Party. Subsequently, he was succeeded by Chu Sheng-hao. The next year, President Lee Teng-hui nominated Yeh to the Control Yuan. In 1997, Yeh helped Hou You-yi and Frank Hsieh resolve the Alexander family hostage crisis. Yeh left the Control Yuan in 1999. He called for either President Chen Shui-bian or Premier Chang Chun-hsiung to resign in January 2001, as the Executive Yuan had issued an order to end work on the Longmen Nuclear Power Plant without consulting the legislature. Yeh ran as an independent in the legislative elections of 2001, and was defeated. Yeh then invested in Tsingtao Beer. In March 2004, Yeh faced Lo Chih-ming in debates about the cross-strait referendum to be held later that month. In October 2004, Yeh was named to a committee convened to investigate the 3-19 shooting incident. After the Judicial Yuan ruled to reduce the committee's powers in December, Yeh stated that "justice was interfering with the legislature." He was elected to the National Assembly as a representative of the People First Party in 2005, and subsequently granted a seat on the presidium of its fourth convocation. Yeh later became a political commentator.

The Kuomintang nominated Yeh to a second term on the Control Yuan in March 2007. He was renominated in September 2008, after the Ma Ying-jeou administration took office, and confirmed in November 2008. In 2009, Yeh co-wrote impeachment charges against Lin Ling-san, voted to censure the Ministry of National Defense over its handling of Justin Yifu Lin's 1979 defection, and took lead roles investigating Taiwan High Speed Rail and damage from Typhoon Morakot. In 2011, Yeh accepted a petition from the Public Television Service against the Government Information Office. He also participated on reviews of martial law, as well as probes of alleged corruption within Taipei City Government regarding the Xinsheng Overpass project and the International Flora Exposition.

In February 2012, Yeh and the Judicial Yuan began investigating Tsai Ing-wen's ties to the former Yu Chang Biologics Company. Though the Judicial Yuan ended its involvement that August, Yeh's probe continued, aided by colleagues Ma Yi-kung and Ma Hsiu-ru. As the Yu Chang case was pending, Yeh turned his attention to Lin Hsi-shan's investments, resulting in his impeachment. Yeh next participated in impeachment proceedings against Taipower executives, then reviewed housing restrictions placed on people accused of crimes. In August 2012, Yeh himself was investigated by the Special Investigation Division of the Ministry of Justice. Later that year, Yeh received a petition to review the death penalty. In February 2013, he announced the Control Yuan's decision to censure the Ministry of Economic Affairs for its failure to review contracts signed by China Steel, which led to Lin Yi-shih facing accusations of bribery. The Control Yuan issued a verdict on the Yu Chang case in October 2013, deciding to censure Tsai Ing-wen. Before he stepped down in 2014, Yeh led a discussion on the statute of limitations for Justin Yifu Lin, and helped Lee Fu-tien and Lin Chu-liang review the implementation of the Communication Security and Surveillance Act.
