= Chen Shui-bian corruption charges =

Corruption scandal in Taiwan

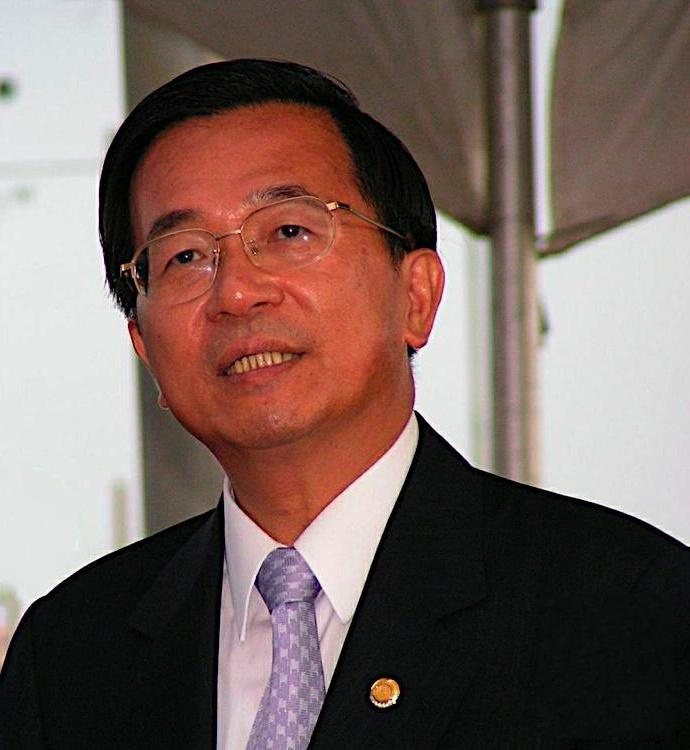
Chen Shui-bian

Chen Shui-bian, former President of the Republic of China, stepped down on May 20, 2008, the same day that Ma Ying-jeou took office as the new President of the Republic of China. About an hour after he left the Presidential Office Building, as a former President of the Republic of China and no longer enjoying presidential immunity, he was arrested and restricted from leaving the nation by Taiwanese prosecutors due to allegations of corruption and abuse of authority. Chen was accused of fraud in a case involving the handling of a special presidential fund used to pursue Taiwan's foreign diplomacy. However, the Special Investigation Division dropped money-laundering charges because of a lack of evidence.

President Ma Ying-jeou moved to declassify documents that would aid in the investigation of the former president's use of special expenses. President Ma was then sued by Chen's lawyers on August 6, 2008, who called Ma's declassification of case-aiding documents "politically motivated." The documents which were sought were classified earlier by Chen. The documents are mostly receipts and records of use of special expenses.

== Alleged money laundering ==
On August 14, 2008, shortly after a press conference held by rival party Kuomintang (KMT) legislators announcing the existence of a request for money laundering investigation assistance letter from the Swiss government, the former president called an evening press conference and admitted that his past election campaigns had misstated election finance expenses, and had leftover monies in campaign coffers forwarded to overseas accounts. Chen stated during the conference, "My conscience has told me that I cannot continue to lie to myself or to others, so I will choose to be bluntly honest: I have, in the past, committed deeds that are against the rule of law, and I am willing, for all campaign finance dishonesty from my four elections for mayor and for president, to apologize to the people".

Chen claimed that the money was wired overseas by his wife and without his knowing. There is also an investigation launched by Swiss authorities over a Swiss bank account bearing Chen's daughter-in-law's name: roughly US$31 million were wired to the account from Taiwan and was then forwarded again to an account in the Cayman Islands. Swiss and Taiwan authorities are cooperating in investigating whether or not there are instances of money laundering committed by members of the former first family. It is unknown whether or not the wiring of the Swiss accounts and the wiring of campaign money overseas by Mrs. Chen are related. Chen and his wife are currently restricted from leaving Taiwan.

Chen's August 14 admission was a reversal of his position just one day earlier, when he vehemently denied a Next Magazine report of the same story.

The following day, August 15, Chen announced that both he and his wife will leave the Democratic Progressive Party for good from the fallout of the previous day's admission.

Reaction to Chen's admission was negative. Former DPP chairman Shih Ming-teh (1994–96), claimed to have been eating while Chen called his press conference, and threw his chopsticks down in anger upon hearing his confession. Chen's vice-president for throughout his eight years, Annette Lu, has said, "If I had not heard it with my own ears, I would not have believed it; I am still in disbelief. Any person who genuinely loves Taiwan will not wire money of contributors and of the people overseas. The former first family have affronted Taiwan and the Taiwanese people"

Chen Shui-bian and his wife Wu Shu-jen, on August 15, resigned from the Democratic Progressive Party and apologized, saying "Today I have to say sorry to all of the DPP members and supporters. I let everyone down, caused you humiliation and failed to meet your expectations. My acts have caused irreparable damage to the party. I love the DPP deeply and am proud of being a DPP member. To express my deepest regrets to all DPP members and supporters, I announce my withdrawal from the DPP immediately. My wife Wu Shu-jen is also withdrawing from the party." DPP Chairwoman Tsai Ing-wen also apologized to the public on behalf of the party: "In regard to Chen and his wife's decision to withdraw from the party and his desire to shoulder responsibility for his actions as well as to undergo an investigation by the party's anti-corruption committee, we respect his decision and accept it." Taiwan prosecutors on August 16 interrogated Wu Shu-jen and asked her to explain overseas money transactions. A Kuomintang (KMT) party member alleged that Chen's wife bought jewelry to launder money. Hung Hsiu-chu, a member of the ruling KMT, charged that Chen's family opened four bank accounts in Switzerland, with total deposits of US$32 million, which Chen remitted through his daughter-in-law, Huang Jui-ching.

On August 17, Supreme Court Prosecutor's Office announced Taiwanese investigators took away boxes of documents, after search of Chen's home in Taipei City, his office, and in Tainan, at the home of his wife's brother Wu Ching-mao. Chen was prohibited by prosecutors from leaving Taiwan. Chen has (US?/NT?)$21 million at overseas banks held in the name of family members. Shih Ming-teh, a former leader of Chen's Democratic Progressive Party accused Chen of laundering at least (US?/NT?)$85 million from an entrepreneur bidding for bank ownership in 2005. Coast Guard Administration spokesman Hsieh Ching-chin said: "We received the order from the special investigation unit around 9:20 p.m. last night saying former president Chen was barred from leaving the country." Chen's probe concerns NT$14.8 million (US$480,500) in special expenses from the government, while he was president, and his wife is on trial for corruption and document forgery. Prosecutors found at least NT$1.5 million had been spent on diamond rings and other luxury items for his wife. Upon his return to Taiwan, Chen's son claimed that he was a mere "figurehead," and was not directly involved in the transfer of money.

Chen commented upon the public's suspicions that he had engaged in money laundering by colorfully stating: "Money is dry, it cannot be laundered; money is clean, not dirty, it does not need to be laundered."

Taiwan's representative to Switzerland George Liu had offered a written resignation from his position in July 2008 that was approved in August 2008. After Liu's resignation took effect, his actions regarding the letter sent by the Federal Department of Justice and Police were found to have shown a "lack of political judgement" and he was duly investigated for dereliction of duty. The Control Yuan passed a resolution to impeach Liu for dereliction of duty on September 30, 2008.

On October 31, 2008, Chiou I-jen was arrested and detained incommunicado, by Supreme Prosecutors Office's Special Investigation Division Prosecutors, for alleged embezzlement of about US$500,000 from diplomatic funds, in 2004, as secretary-general of the National Security Council. Chen Shui-bian called his arrest a "political persecution" by the Beijing-friendly Kuomintang government amid and after another senior DPP member -- Chiayi County magistrate Chen Ming-wen's detention on corruption charges: "The government abused the laws and its powers to persecute and humiliate us but the people and the history will return justice to us and prove our innocence. The government of President Ma Ying-jeou is settling old scores in the name of a campaign against corruption. The Special Investigation Division (SID), in order to indict and convict me, has been taking high-profile actions, locking up members of the former government team one by one." Chiou I-jen is the 8th suspect in spin-offs of Chen Shui-bian's money laundering probes under the jurisdiction of the Taipei District Court.

== Arrest and detention ==
Chen was escorted by security staff, on November 11, 2008, into the Taipei prosecutor's office for questioning. He was served a subpoena for the 5th time by the Special Investigation Division (SID) on November 10, but he opted to exercise his right to remain silent in the 6-month SID money-laundering probe, and the case terminates on November 24. Chen alleged that "The KMT and the Chinese Communist Party see me as their number one prisoner as I am the biggest stone blocking their way to reunification. Chinese envoy Chen Yunlin had a bad time in Taiwan... so (Taiwan's President) Ma Ying-jeou wants to put me in jail as a sacrifice to appease China. I am very honoured and proud to play such a role." He then commented, "the voice of Taiwanese people can never be suppressed by heavy-handed riot police presence, nor could it be clamped down by razor wires; Taiwan independence; my heart will be with all 23 million people... I will spend the rest of my limited life to fight for justice with the public; the prosecutors would file a request to detain me and the Taipei District Court would grant the request for detention. Long live Taiwanese democracy. Long live Taiwanese independence." On 12 November 2008, Taiwan Affairs Office of the PRC in a routine press conference denied the allegation describing it as a "rumour". It further stated it "believes that people can see through the purpose behind this clumsy tactic of rumour making".

After 6 hours, Chen left the Supreme Court prosecutor's office in handcuffs, arrested and detained. He held his cuffed hands up for journalists and shouted "Political persecution! Long live Taiwan!" Prosecutors, led by investigation spokesman Chen Yun-nan, filed a detention request with the Taipei District Court. He said he would enter "Taiwan's Bastille (Tucheng Detention Center)," but "it will only lock up my body, not my heart." The charges carry each a minimum penalty of 5 years imprisonment.

Chen, 57, arrived at the Taipei District Court, after the prosecutor's marathon interrogation (from 9:45 a.m. to 4:30 p.m. on November 11). The 11-hour trial started at 8:00 p.m. on November 11. The Court suspended the proceedings, after Chen's lawyer Lai Ching-te claimed a policeman hit him. Chen was rushed to National Taiwan University Hospital, and after 2 hours, the doctors confirmed a slight right arm muscle injury due to strain, possibly caused by a police officer's unintentional pulling of his arm while being detained.

Following a night of deliberation, the Taipei District Court formally arrested and jailed Chen, at 7:06 a.m. on November 12, under an order that does not constitute an indictment. Chen can be held for 4 months before being formally charged. Huang Chun-min, Taipei district court spokesman quoted the ruling: "The court, after questioning the suspect, believes the suspected crimes to be severe. And there are enough facts to believe there was buried evidence, fabrication, altered evidence and conspiracy among suspects or witnesses." He was sent to the Taipei Detention Center, 8:00 a.m., where, as a dissident leader 21 years ago, he served 8 months for defaming a Nationalist Party official. Chen's attorneys' filed waiver of his right to appeal the order. Chen, banned from communicating with anybody outside the Taipei Detention Center, can be in custody for a maximum of 2 months. He joins nine others detained on alleged laundering (US?/NT?)$30 million, which include Ma Yong-cheng, Chiou I-jen, the ex-vice premier, Yeh Sheng-mao, and Chen's brother-in-law, Wu Ching-mao, inter alia. Chen was assigned prisoner number 2630.

=== Hunger strike and privileges ===
His lawyer Cheng Wen-long (鄭文龍) stated, on November 13: "He intends to stop eating in protest ... in an okay condition now. He's not eating anything. I've been urging him, but he still refuses. Chen was willing to stay in the dark prison cell (Tucheng detention center in Taipei) for the people... to protest the death of justice and the regression of democracy ... he can sacrifice his life for the "Republic of Taiwan" (quotation). His arrest is like 'sentencing without a trial'. Chen had only drunk water since entering a detention centre early Wednesday and had not eaten a proper meal since late Tuesday." Corrections official Lee Ta-chu said his institution "is monitoring (Chen's) situation closely."

Meanwhile, Presidential Office spokesman Wang Yu-chi, stated "the office will act in accordance with a statute which allows for a secret service team of 8 to 12 persons assigned to a former president, for a payment of NT$250,000 per month to be made to him, and for him to collect an annual allocation of up to NT$8 million to cover the expenses of day-to-day operation of his office. Except for the security detail, Chen will retain all other aspects of the preferential treatment. The Presidential Office has listed NT$11.25 million in its 2009 annual budget for allocation to Chen."

Chen ended his two-week hunger strike on November 27.

=== Hospitalization, appeal and petition for release ===
On November 16, 2008, Chen collapsed and was rushed to Taipei's Far Eastern Memorial Hospital due to complications and weakness from dehydration caused by six days of malnutrition. He was treated with saline and glucose injections after experiencing "an excessively fast heartbeat and tightness in chest," amid slow metabolism. Chen was transferred to the Panchiao Hospital Monday for possible force-feeding.

Despite Chen's lack of interest to appeal, his lawyer Cheng Wen-long completed the motion to release from detention and notice of appeal of the court's decision, with a petition for constitutional interpretation to restrain actions violative of the Constitution.

== Formal indictment and further developments ==
Former president Chen Shui-bian was released without bail on December 13, 2008, after being indicted for money laundering and misuse of public funds hours earlier. The district court ordered that Chen remain in Taiwan to face pending trial. Chen was arraigned before judges at the Taipei district court, where he protested the "political persecution" against him. Chen reaffirmed his innocence, claiming the US$21 million his wife wired to their son's Swiss bank accounts came from leftover campaign donations. Also indicted were former first lady Wu Shu-chen, their son Chen Chih-chung and their son's wife Huang Jui-ching, as well as other relatives, friends and top assistants. Two of the nine other defendants are relatives of the Chen family. Prosecutors say Chen and his wife together embezzled NT$104 million (US$3.12 million) from a special presidential fund, and received bribes of US$11.73 million in connection with a government land procurement deal and a separate construction project. Prosecutor Lin Che-hui said that a particularly damning piece of evidence was the presence of NT$740 million (US$22.2 million) in cash stashed in a Taipei bank safety vault held by the Chens. "Ex-president Chen Shui-bian's crimes are major," said Chen Yun-nan, spokesman for the Supreme Court's special prosecutor's office. "We will ask the courts to give ex-president Chen Shui-bian the strictest punishment". President Ma Ying-jeou made no comment on the indictment, but Democratic Progressive Party leaders demanded that Chen be released on bail. No other former President of the Republic of China has faced criminal prosecution.

=== First appeal for continued detention ===
On December 16, 2008, prosecutors of the Special Counsel filed an appeal to reverse Chen's release and to resume his detention out of fear Chen may flee the country. "After serving as president for eight years," the appeal said, "Chen Shui-bian knows the national security mechanism full well, and the chances he has to flee the country are greater than ordinary citizens". The appeal cited several instances where other leaders (such as Alberto Fujimori of Peru, Pavlo Lazarenko of Ukraine, Thaksin Shinawatra of Thailand, and Ferdinand Marcos of Philippines) having been indicted, fled their respective countries after they had been charged with corruption and graft. On December 18, Judge Chou again ruled that Chen be released without bail, albeit the High Court warned of the possibility that he may collaborate or intimidate other defendants, including his relatives and Yu Cheng-hsien, former minister of the interior.

=== Second appeal for continued detention ===
On December 25, 2008, prosecutors of the same counsel appealed for the second time for continued detention of the former President. In this second appeal, the prosecution urged the Taiwan High Court to decide to detain or release Chen rather than remit the case to Judge Chou Chan-chun (周占春) again. Reversing their initial decision not to appeal, Special Counsel prosecutors submitted their written appeal to the Taiwan high court, requesting that Chen be detained. The grounds for the detention remain the same (fear that the former President might leave the country, conspire with witnesses or destroy evidence). The chances are that the High Court will pass the buck back to Chou, who said in releasing Chen for the second time, he hopes he would not have to hand down the same ruling again. One reason for the appellate court to remit the case again is that the Special Counsel failed to elaborate on the possibility of Chen's intimidation of other defendants. Rather it kept on elaborating on the possibility of Chen's escape alone. Another piece of evidence produced to sustain this second appeal was the fact that bodyguards stay overnight on the ground floor of the Paolai Estate in Taipei, where the Chens live in an 11th floor apartment. "There is little chance the bodyguards would know what is happening on the 11th floor," the new appeal says.

=== Judge change ===
On December 26, 2008, in a meeting held among the court's presiding judges, a vote decided that Tsai Shou-hsun (蔡守訓) would take over the Chen-related case from presiding judge Chou Chan-chun (周占春) because Tsai had previously handled cases concerning Chen. Judges at the court held a raffle for the assignment to handle the case. Panning the move as "political intervention," DPP caucus whip Ker Chien-ming declared that "the judiciary is doomed". Cheng Wen-lung (鄭文龍), who is Chen's defense attorney made his own public declaration: "We do not care for how the Special Investigation Division is conducting itself. How can the court change the judges after the lots have already been openly cast? (By doing so,) the public confidence in the system will greatly decrease". However, legislators of the ruling Kuomintang, such as Chiu Yi questioned whether Tsai had the wherewithal to rule in Chen's case: "Over the past two years, Tsai Shou-shun has allowed Wu Shu-jen to be absent from 18 court proceedings. The case has been stalled for more than two years and wasted a lot of public resources".

=== Lee Teng-hui connection ===
This same day (December 26), in an event related to this case, the Special Investigation Division of the Supreme Prosecutor's Office announced it would investigate former president Lee Teng-hui, who preceded Chen Shui-bian in the presidency of the Republic of China on suspicion of money laundering. SIP spokesman Chen Yun-nan (陳雲南) held a meeting with reporters. When asked if former president Chen Shui-bian was the accuser as some local media had reported, the prosecutor said "yes". Political reactions to this new accusation soon emerged: Taiwan Solidarity Union Secretary-General Lin Chih-chia slammed Chen Shui-bian for blurring the focus of the case by allegedly accusing Lee (the party's spiritual leader). "Everyone knows Chen's only tactic left is to blur the focus. I am 200 percent confident in Lee's integrity," Lin declared. Later the same day however, one of Chen Shui-bian's defense attorneys, Shih Yi-lin (石宜琳), said his client never filed any complaints with the prosecutors against Lee. Lee denied the charges on December 21, and said he welcomed investigation. On December 26, his office declined to comment on the prosecutors' move.

On December 27, 2008, former Democratic Progressive Party lawmaker Lin Cho-shui lashed out at the former president for not only being a corrupt president, but also a "ratting" president who is seriously plaguing the DPP, Taiwan, and the Taiwan independence movement. Lin declared this in response to press reports that Chen accused Lee Teng-hui of embezzling NT$ 1.6 billion from the national coffers when interrogated by prosecutors of his corruption scandals, but then immediately asked his lawmaker to deny the accusation after prosecutors confirmed that Chen did file the accusation against Lee. Lin said that Lee should face legal prosecution if he was really involved in the corruption scandal as accused by Chen, also adding that if Chen ratted on Lee's embezzlement scandal based on a sense of justice, "why is it okay for him to embezzle a tremendous amount of money, and why is it okay to accuse Lee and then deny the accusation?" "Such a ratting practice by Chen is designed mainly to divert public attention away from his corruption cases," Lin said.

This same day, former President of the Republic of China Lee Teng-hui said that the country's power transfer of 2000 only "provided someone with the opportunity to take bribes and launder money". He also added that "It is a pity that one man was able to mess up the administration's governance so badly." In another moment of his speech at the annual meeting of the Chiayi chapter of the Friends of Lee Teng-hui Association he declared that "what is even more pitiful is that some people continue to support the corrupt politician in defiance of his approaching court trial". "They (the supporters of Chen Shuibian) cannot tell right from wrong". He never mentioned the name of Chen in any moment. He also had harsh words for the Ma Ying-jeou administration, concerning the management of the 2008 financial crisis, also stating that democracy and the human rights conditions in Taiwan have been back pedaling since the 2008 legislative and presidential Kuomintang victories and the transfer of power.

Chen has accused Lee of having laundered as much as US$ 51 million through overseas dummy accounts, but Lee has repeatedly denied the allegations. Before boarding a high-speed train to Chiayi, when asked to comment on the money laundering allegations, he declared that "that's laughable stuff".

=== Back into detention (second appeal result) ===
On December 29, 2008, the former President strongly defended himself again as innocent of all corruption charges at a prolonged hearing held by three judges of Taipei District Court that tried to determine whether to put the former national leader back into custody on the second request of prosecutors. The debated hearing session started at 2:00 p.m. that day and continued into the early morning on 30 December. He was accompanied by a team of three lawyers. Outside the district court a large number of police were deployed to prevent possible confrontation between Chen's supporters and opponents. Chen's lawyers complained to new presiding Judge Tsai Shou-hsun (蔡守訓) about the lopsided manpower on each side, saying there were six prosecutors present at the hearing versus only four on their side (three lawyers plus Chen, who himself is a licensed lawyer). Tsai rejected all the requests. The former President stressed that he never took bribes concerning the payoff involving the construction of the Nangang Exhibition Hall or the transaction of a land parcel related to an industrial park in Longtan, Taoyuan County. Concerning the deposits at bank accounts abroad, Chen stressed that the money deposited abroad was all left over from political contributions he received and expenditures on campaigns. His lawyers also defined the money as residual funds from election campaigns and said Chen did not break any law because there were no regulations requiring candidates to report their finances at the time when the money was wired abroad. Concerning the land transaction, the prosecutors pointed out that Chen used his position to force the Cabinet to change its position to approve the deal. As a result, Taiwan Cement Corporation paid NT$400 million as commission for the land purchase. A total of US$6 million of the total amount was passed through several bank accounts held by the former first family and friends abroad in an attempt to hide the illegality of the fund, the prosecutors said. They also stressed, as in the first appeal, the necessity to place Chen under detention because there are several other scams allegedly related to him which are still under probe. The prosecutors have so far uncovered at least NT$740 million in illegal gains tied to the Chen family but they were able to seize only NT$172 million of the total fund.

After considering the case, this same day (30 December), the Court ordered former President Chen Shui-bian returned to jail pending trial on corruption charges, accepting prosecutors' arguments that he be locked up to prevent him fleeing or colluding with alleged coconspirators. In a statement the Taipei District Court said Chen's detention was necessary for his trial to go smoothly: "Out of concerns for human rights and the public interest, Chen Shui-bian should be detained but he should also be allowed to receive visitors". Chen was taken back to Tucheng detention center in suburban Taipei early on 30 December, following a 12-hour court hearing. He spent 31 days in Tucheng after his arrest 12 November. During that time he was only allowed to see his lawyers. Chen's lawyers said they will appeal the new detention order. One of the former president's lawyers, Cheng Wen-lung (Jen Wenlong), described the ruling as "unfair" and vowed to appeal: "The ruling is not a surprise, because apparently it is the result of politics intervening in justice," the lawyer said. "My client... said he would keep striving to prove his innocence," he said. He also stated that: "We question the work of the Taipei district court. Changing the judge is an interference with the justice system".

Political reactions to this new development soon emerged following party lines: Democratic Progressive Party Chairperson Tsai Ing-wen said that the government and the judicial authorities should explain to the public why they felt it necessary to detain Chen ahead of his trial. "The detention and handcuffing of Chen ahead of his trial may have violated the Constitution," she said, also adding that the government should clear up doubts on whether the change of judges before Chen's trial was a result of political pressure. Chen's office criticized the decision to re-detain Chen, saying it once again highlighted the Ma Ying-jeou administration's efforts to wage judicial persecution and a political vendetta against the former President. The statement also denounced the new presiding judge, saying his argument for Chen's custody was nothing but a show cooked up for the purpose of sending him back to prison. The office of the former President also questioned the impartiality of Minister of Justice Wang Ching-feng, who they said was not only "arrogant" but also "blind". When asked for comment, Kuomintang Legislator Lee Ching-hua applauded the court's detention of Chen: "The court's decision to detain Chen Shui-bian was the best possible gift to the public before year's end. All of the witnesses (in the case) no longer need to be afraid," Lee said.

=== Taiwan High Court ruling ===
On January 6, 2009, the Taiwan High Court upheld a lower court decision to detain the former President. The High Court determined that Chen's appeal against the Taipei District Court's ruling was unjustified and concluded that Chen's detention is necessary to facilitate subsequent trials. It mentioned the possibility that Chen could run away, destroy or forge evidence, or collude with co-conspirators. No further appeal of the detention ruling is permitted. Chen's lawyer Cheng Wen-lung called the ruling "unlawful" and "unconstitutional", and said he will petition for a constitutional interpretation by the Constitutional Court on behalf of the former President. The High Court noted in its ruling that Chen's intent to flee is demonstrated by the fact that the former first family has tried to conceal its alleged illicit gains in bank accounts created under the names of other people.

The court made the ruling after Chen's lawyer appealed the Taipei District Court's December 29 decision to put Chen back into custody. The trial is scheduled to begin at the Taipei District Court on January 19.

On June 8, 2010, the Taipei District Court found former President Chen Shui-bian not guilty of embezzling diplomatic funds. On June 11, the High Court decided to cut former president Chen's life sentence for corruption to 20 years in jail. Despite the reduced sentence, on June 18, 2010, the high court decided to retain the former president in jail for another 2 months.

=== Republic of China Supreme Court ruling ===
On November 11, 2010, the Supreme Court of the Republic of China sentenced Chen and his wife, Wu Shu-jen (吳淑珍), to 11 years in prison for taking bribes for a land procurement scam in Longtan and 8 years in a separate office-buying scandal. The rulings were the final convictions in a string of corruption cases implicating Chen and his wife. By law, the High Court can decide whether the combined 19-year sentence should be served concurrently or consecutively. It was ruled that Chen's total prison time should be 17-and-a-half years. Chen made history as Taiwan's first former head of state to be jailed. In addition Chen is ordered to pay a fine of NT$154 million. It is unusual as the same group of judges gave a not-guilty ruling on a similar case base on the reason "the officer duty has to be clearly specified and no violation of law if the officer does not violate his duty."

Both the Chinese Nationalist Party (KMT) and the Democratic Progressive Party (DPP) said that they respected the court's decision.

Three other cases, including charges related to another land deal, money laundering and embezzling secret diplomatic funds, for which the Taiwan High Court originally ruled the former president should serve a 20-year sentence, were returned to the lower court by the Supreme Court for another ruling.

=== United States Department of Justice ===
In July 2016, the United States Department of Justice announced it returned "approximately $1.5 million to Taiwan, the proceeds of the sale of a forfeited New York condominium and a Virginia residence that the United States alleged in its complaint were purchased with the proceeds of bribes." It also stated that Hong Kong and Swiss bank accounts, shell companies, and a St. Kitts and Nevis trust were used to launder the bribes that paid for the American properties. It was an inter-agency and international effort between the U.S. Justice Department, U.S. Immigration and Customs Enforcement’s Homeland Security Investigations, and Taiwan's Supreme Prosecutors Office’s Special Investigations Division.
