= Huang Cheng-che =

Taiwanese politician (born 1948)

Huang Cheng-che (Chinese: 黃政哲; born 30 November 1948) is a Taiwanese politician.

== Education and career ==
Huang received a military education at what is now known as National Defense University. He worked for a number of engineering and construction firms and was president of the board of trustees for the present-day Kainan University. Huang was elected to the Legislative Yuan for the first time in 2001 via proportional representation, as a candidate listed on the Taiwan Solidarity Union party list. During Huang's first term as a legislator, he commented that China Airlines should change its name to incorporate Taiwan, to assuage the airline of bad luck following the crash of Flight 611. He was reelected in 2004, again via the TSU party list. Following Huang's indictment for fraud in November 2006, his TSU party membership was suspended, and Lin Chih-chia was appointed to complete Huang's second legislative term.
