= Lin Cho-shui =

Taiwanese politician (born 1947)

Lin Cho-shui MLY
- 林濁水
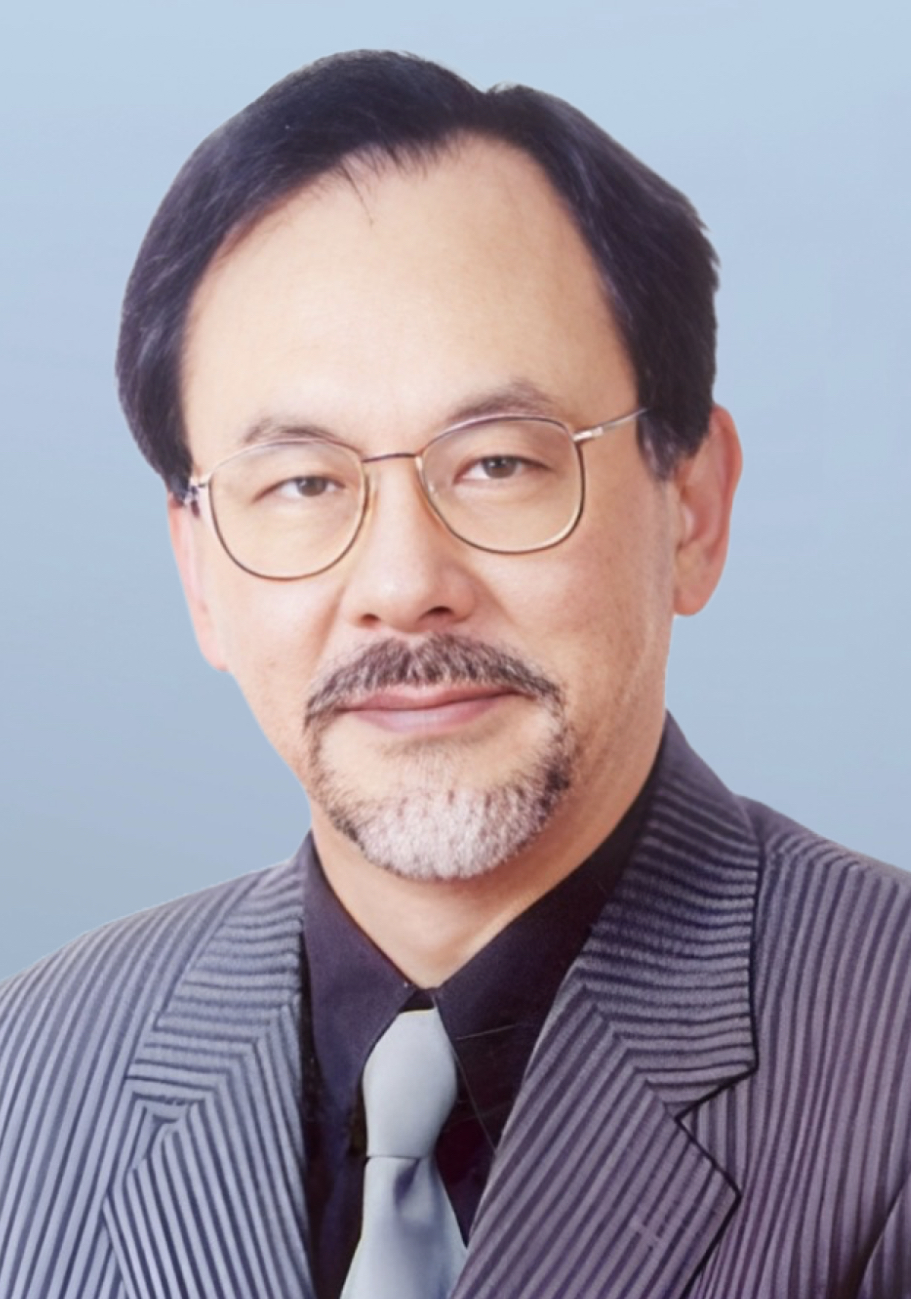

Member of the Legislative Yuan
- In office 1 February 2002 – 15 November 2006
- Succeeded by: Hsu Te-hsiang
- Constituency: Republic of China
- In office 1 February 1993 – 31 January 2002
- Constituency: Taipei 1 (Taipei North until 1999)

Personal details
- Born: 25 March 1947 (age 79) Puli, Taichung County, Taiwan
- Party: Democratic Progressive Party (since 1986)
- Education: National Chengchi University (BA)

Lin Cho-shui (Chinese: 林濁水; pinyin: Lín Zhuóshuǐ; born 25 March 1947) is a Taiwanese writer, newspaper editor and politician who served in the Legislative Yuan from 1993 to 2006. He was a longtime member of the Democratic Progressive Party's New Tide faction.

== Education ==
After graduating from National Hsinchu Senior High School, Lin earned a bachelor's degree in Arabic at National Chengchi University.

== Political career ==
Lin was an original member of the New Tide faction, a group within the Democratic Progressive Party formed by tangwai movement activists to oppose DPP politician Kang Ning-hsiang and later supportive of Chen Shui-bian. Lin helped write the party's founding charter. In 1998, it was suggested that the party platform be revised. Lin and Julian Kuo drafted an amendment delineating the DPP's acceptance of the Republic of China as the official name for Taiwan. By January 1999, it was decided that changes to the party platform would not be made.

Lin was elected to the Legislative Yuan three times as a representative of Taipei 1. For a portion of his first term, Lin was the Democratic Progressive Party caucus whip. In 1999, the Ministry of the Interior proposed a law on referendums. Lin opposed the bill, because the MOI draft did not make Taiwanese sovereignty an issue eligible for referendum. He won the 2001 and 2004 legislative elections via party-list proportional representation. In July 2003, President Chen Shui-bian recommended that the Lungmen Nuclear Power Plant and Taiwan's membership in the World Trade Organization both be considered for referendum, a move Lin supported. When the Referendum Act was promulgated in December 2003, a referendum on cross-strait relations did indeed occur in March 2004. A "sunshine code" provision, which mandated the use of blind trusts for all members of the Executive Yuan and every overseas diplomat, passed in February 2006 with support from Lin. In June 2006, the Statute Governing Preferential Treatment for Retired Presidents and Vice Presidents was revised, lowering pensions for former leaders of Taiwan. Lin stated that the amendments were not adequate. Also that month, Lin asked Chiou I-jen to step down as claims of corruption within the Chen administration began. Lin had pledged to resign if Chen were detained, and gave up his seat on 13 November 2006, officially leaving the legislature on 15 November. Lin declared his candidacy for the legislative elections of 2008, and quit the race after winning only 11.01% of the vote in a party primary.

== Political stances ==
Lin supports the Taiwan independence movement and believes that Cross-Strait relations are of an international nature. He often writes for the Taipei Times. Editorials authored for the publication have criticized increasing government bureaucracy, and the policies and actions of Ma Ying-jeou. Lin has written on party politics within the Democratic Progressive Party, and believes vice chairman positions within political parties contribute to bureaucracy. Lin has also expressed disapproval of the DPP, specifically targeting politicians Annette Lu and Yen Ching-chang. He supports pension reform, and expanding the investigative powers of the legislature and Control Yuan.

Lin has covered the 1992 Consensus repeatedly, as well as Cross-Strait relations, and China itself in his writings. Lin's contributions to the Times further include political survey analysis and opinions on the use and meaning of national symbols.
