= Wang Shih-hsun =

Taiwanese politician and journalist

Wang Shih-hsun (Chinese: 王世勛; born 15 January 1951) is a Taiwanese politician and journalist.

== Journalism career ==
Wang wrote for the Taiwan Times and the Capital Morning Post.

== Political career ==
Wang served two terms on the Taichung City Council and one term on the Taiwan Provincial Council before his election to the Legislative Yuan, on which he represented Taichung from 1999 to 2002. During his first Legislative Yuan term, Wang commented on the relationship between legislative immunity and news leaks, the use of Taiwanese Hokkien during legislative proceedings, and drew attention to a dispute between Taichung locals and the Ministry of Education regarding the rebuilding of Tungshi Vocational High School. Wang returned to the Legislative Yuan in 2005. During his second term, Wang and Lai Shyh-bao opposed a same-six marriage bill proposed by Hsiao Bi-khim in 2006. Wang lost to Ho Min-hao in a public opinion poll used to determine the Pan-Green Coalition candidate for Taichung's third district before the 2008 legislative election. Ho then left the Taiwan Solidarity Union to represent Wang's Democratic Progressive Party in the election.
