= Mark Ho =

Mark Ho may refer to:

- Ho Chih-wei (born 1982), Taiwanese politician, Taipei City Council member from 2010 to 2018, and member of the Legislative Yuan from 2019 to 2024
- Ho Min-hao (born 1958), Taiwanese politician and member of the Legislative Yuan from 2002 to 2008
