= Lin Chih-sheng =

Lin Chih-sheng may refer to:

- Lin Chih-sheng (baseball) (born 1982), Taiwanese professional baseball infielder
- Lin Chih-sheng (politician) (1950-2019), Taiwanese politician
