= Hsu Te-hsiang =

Taiwanese politician

Hsu Te-hsiang MLY
- 許德祥

Member of the Legislative Yuan
- In office 24 November 2006 – 31 January 2008
- Preceded by: Lin Cho-shui
- Constituency: Republic of China

Personal details
- Party: Democratic Progressive Party
- Occupation: Politician

Hsu Te-hsiang (Chinese: 許德祥) is a Taiwanese politician. He served on the Sixth Legislative Yuan from 2006 to 2008, succeeding Lin Cho-shui, who had resigned.

Hsu has led several fishing associations.
