= Huang Kun-huei =

Taiwanese politician and educator (born 1936)

- 黃昆輝
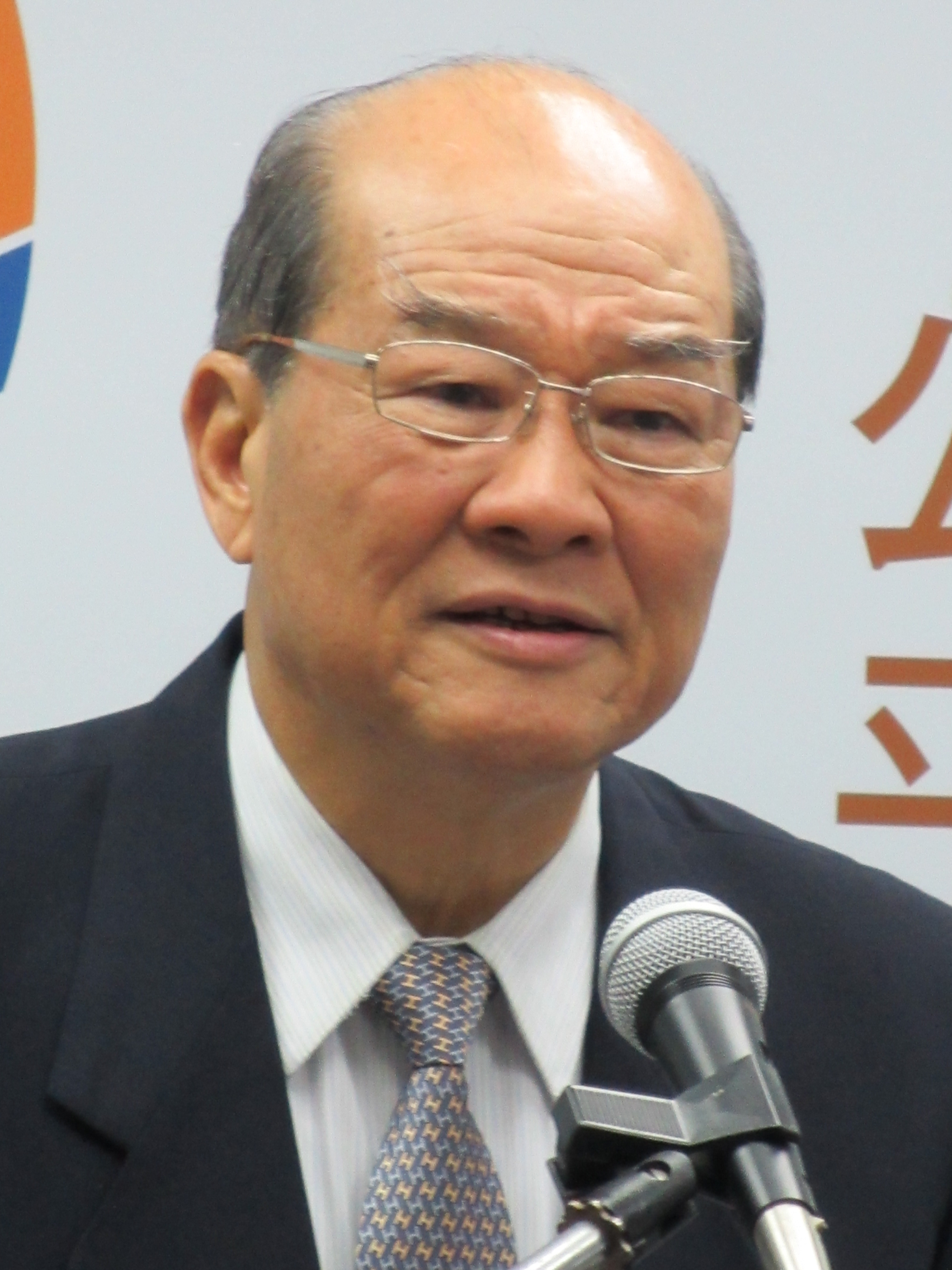

Chairman of the Taiwan Solidarity Union
- In office 26 January 2007 – 18 January 2016
- Preceded by: Shu Chin-chiang; Lin Chih-chia (acting)
- Succeeded by: Lin Chih-chia (acting); Liu Yi-te

Secretary-General of the Kuomintang
- In office 18 November 1999 – 20 March 2000
- Preceded by: John Chiang
- Succeeded by: Lin Fong-cheng

Secretary-General to the President
- In office 5 August 1996 – 17 November 1999
- President: Lee Teng-hui
- Deputies: Stephen S.F. Chen; Hwang Jeng-shyong; Su Chi; Lin Bih-jaw
- Preceded by: Wu Po-hsiung
- Succeeded by: John Chiang

Minister of the Interior
- In office 15 February 1994 – 10 June 1996
- Preceded by: Wu Po-hsiung
- Succeeded by: Lin Fong-cheng

Minister of the Mainland Affairs Council
- In office 1 June 1991 – 14 December 1994
- Deputy: Ma Ying-jeou
- Preceded by: Shih Chi-yang
- Succeeded by: Vincent Siew

Personal details
- Born: 8 November 1936 (age 89) Tainan, Taiwan, Empire of Japan
- Party: Taiwan Solidarity Union
- Education: National Taiwan Normal University (BEd); University of Northern Colorado (MEd, PhD)

Huang Kun-huei (Chinese: 黃昆輝; pinyin: Huáng Kūnhuī; born 8 November 1936) is a Taiwanese politician and educator. A former member of the Kuomintang, he had served as the party's secretary general from 1999 to 2000. Prior to that, Huang served as the minister of the Mainland Affairs Council from 1991 to 1994 and Minister of the Interior from 1994 to 1996. He later left the KMT and joined the Taiwan Solidarity Union, chairing the TSU from 2007 to 2016.

== Education ==
Huang graduated from National Taipei University of Education in 1964 with a bachelor's degree in education, then completed advanced studies in the United States, where he earned a master's degree and then a Ph.D. in education from the University of Northern Colorado in 1967 and 1971, respectively.

== TSU Chairmanship ==
Huang was elected leader of the Taiwan Solidarity Union on 19 January 2007.

=== Cross-Straits Economic Trade and Culture Forum ===
Huang stated in October 2013 that the Cross-Straits Economic Trade and Culture Forum that have been going on between the Kuomintang (KMT) and the Chinese Communist Party (CCP), has shown nothing to Taiwan, except how the high-ranking KMT officials fawn over Beijing for personal gain, either financially or politically. The forum has become the platform for the KMT to collaborate with the CCP in containing Taiwan. The Cross-Strait Service Trade Agreement had become a tool in which the government of China pressured Ma Ying-jeou's administration.

Huang resigned his post shortly after the TSU failed to win any legislative seats in the 2016 elections.
