= 2004 Taiwanese cross-strait relations referendum =

Nationwide referendum proposals 1 and 2
- 20 March 2004

The People of Taiwan demand that the Taiwan Strait issue be resolved through peaceful means. Should the Communist Party of China refuse to withdraw the missiles it has targeted at Taiwan and to openly renounce the use of force against us, would you agree that the Government should acquire more advanced anti-missile weapons to strengthen Taiwan's self-defense capabilities?
Yes	91.80%
No	8.20%
Proposal failed due to turnout being below 50%

Would you agree that our Government should engage in negotiation with the Communist Party of China on the establishment of a "peace and stability" framework for cross-strait interactions in order to build consensus and for the welfare of the peoples on both sides?
Yes	92.05%
No	7.95%
Proposal failed due to turnout being below 50%

A consultative referendum was held in Taiwan on 20 March 2004 to coincide with the 2004 presidential elections. Voters were asked two questions regarding the cross-strait relations, that is, between Taiwan and China. The initiation of this referendum by President Chen Shui-bian came under intense criticism from China because it was seen as an exercise for an eventual vote on Taiwanese independence. The Pan-Blue Coalition urged a boycott, citing that the referendum was illegal and unnecessary.

Over 90% of voters approved the two questions, but the results were invalid due to insufficient voter turnout, which was below 50%.

== Background ==
On 29 November 2003 President Chen Shui-bian announced that given that the PRC had missiles aimed at Taiwan, he had the power under the defensive referendum clause of the Referendum Act to order a referendum on sovereignty, although he did not do so under pressure by the USA. This statement was very strongly criticized both by Beijing and by the Pan-Blue Coalition. But instead, he proposed a referendum to ask the PRC to remove the hundreds of missiles it has aimed at Taiwan.

In a televised address made on 16 January 2004 President Chen reiterated his "Four Noes and One Without" pledge, justified the "peace referendum," and announced its questions.

The vetting of the referendum bill appeared to alarm Beijing which issued more sharp threats of a strong reaction if a referendum bill passed which would allow a vote on sovereignty issues such as the territory and flag of the ROC. The final bill that was passed by the Legislative Yuan on 27 November 2003 did not contain restrictions on the content of any referendums, but did include very high hurdles for referendums on constitutional issues. These hurdles were largely put in place by the Pan-Blue Coalition majority in the legislature. The bill also contained a provision for a defensive referendum to be called if the sovereignty of the ROC was under threat. In response to the referendum passage, Beijing issued vague statements of unease.

== Questions ==
=== Proposal 1 ===
The People of Taiwan demand that the Taiwan Strait issue be resolved through peaceful means. Should the Communist Party of China refuse to withdraw the missiles it has targeted at Taiwan and to openly renounce the use of force against us, would you agree that the Government should acquire more advanced anti-missile weapons to strengthen Taiwan's self-defense capabilities? (「台灣人民堅持台海問題應該和平解決。如果中共不撤除瞄準台灣的飛彈、不放棄對台灣使用武力，您是否贊成政府增加購置反飛彈裝備，以強化台灣自我防衛能力？」)

=== Proposal 2 ===
Would you agree that our Government should engage in negotiation with the Communist Party of China on the establishment of a "peace and stability" framework for cross-strait interactions in order to build consensus and for the welfare of the peoples on both sides? (「您是否同意政府與中共展開協商，推動建立兩岸和平穩定的互動架構，以謀求兩岸的共識與人民的福祉？」)

== Campaign ==
A series of ten debates were held over five days (Wednesdays and Sundays) on the referendum (first pair on first question; second on second; pro-government listed before con-)

- 29 February – Cabinet spokesman Lin Chia-lung v. independent Legislator Kao Chin Su-mei; Kaohsiung Mayor Frank Hsieh v. Commentator Li Ao
- 3 March – Office of the President's Deputy Secretary-General Joseph Wu v. poet Chan Chao-li, Minister without Portfolio Yeh Jiunn-rong v. former DPP Chairman Hsu Hsin-liang
- 7 March – TSU Legislator Lo Chih-ming v. former Control Yuan member Yeh Yao-peng; DPP Legislator Chiu Tai-san v. sociologist Timothy Ting
- 10 March – DPP Legislator You Ching v. Green Party Taiwan acting convener Kao Cheng-yan; DPP Legislator Cho Jung-tai v. mainland exile Ruan Ming
- 14 March – DPP Legislator Julian Kuo v. anti-March 20 referendum alliance leader Jaw Shaw-kong; Mainland Affairs Council Chairwoman Tsai Ing-wen v. independent Legislator Sisy Chen

The "no" campaign was not argued by active political figures in the Pan-Blue Coalition, and the CEC at first found it difficult to find people to take the "no" position. The Pan-Blue Coalition made it clear that it was in favour of the proposals, but believed that the referendum process itself was illegal and a prelude to more controversial action. As a consequence, the Pan-Blue Coalition asked its supporters not to vote at all in the referendum, with the intention of having the number of valid votes fall below the 50% voter threshold necessary to have a valid referendum. Because of this strategy, a major controversy was the format of the referendum, specifically as to whether the referendum questions would be on the same ballots as the Presidency. After much debate, the CEC decided that there would be a U-shaped queue in which people would first cast a ballot for president and then cast a separate ballot for each of the two questions. Voters who chose not to cast a referendum ballot could exit the line at the base of the U. Near the end of the campaign, the CEC issued a number of conflicting and constantly changing directives as to what would constitute a valid ballot.

== Results ==
Question	For		Against		Invalid/ blank	Total	Registered voters	Turnout	Outcome
Question	Votes	%	Votes	%	Invalid/ blank	Total	Registered voters	Turnout	Outcome
Proposal 1	6,511,216	91.80	581,413	8.20	359,711	7,452,340	16,497,746	45.17	Quorum not reached
Proposal 2	6,319,663	92.05	545,911	7.95	578,574	7,444,148	16,497,746	45.12	Quorum not reached
Source: CEC
