= Chester Chou =

Taiwanese politician (born 1951)

Chou Wan-lai
- 周萬來
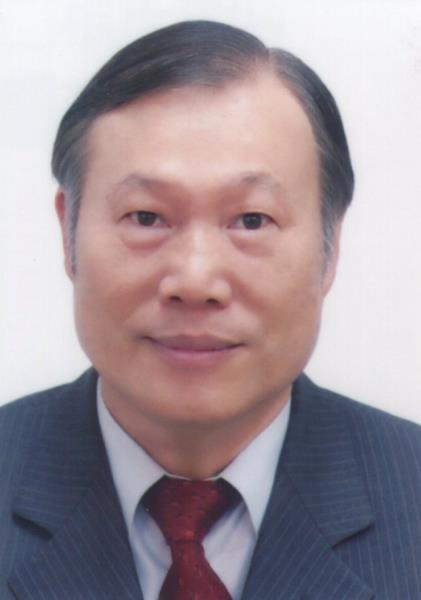
- Official portrait, 2024

20th Secretary-General of Legislative Yuan
- Incumbent
- Assumed office 5 February 2024
- President: Han Kuo-yu
- Deputy: Chang Yu-jung
- Preceded by: Lin Chih-chia

Member of the Examination Yuan
- In office 1 September 2014 – 31 August 2020
- President: Wu Jin-lin

4th Deputy Secretary-General of Legislative Yuan
- In office 1 March 1999 – 31 August 2014
- President: Wang Jin-pyng
- Secretary-General: Lin Hsi-shan
- Succeeded by: Wang Chuan-chong

Personal details
- Born: 12 October 1951 (age 74) Dalin, Chiayi County, Taiwan
- Education: National Taiwan University (BA, MA)

Chou Wan-lai (traditional Chinese: 周萬來; simplified Chinese: 周万来; pinyin: Zhōu Wànlái; born 12 October 1951), also known by his English name Chester Chou, is a Taiwanese politician. He was the deputy secretary-general of the Legislative Yuan from 1999 to 2014. He was appointed as the secretary-general of the Legislative Yuan in 2024 by Yuan President Han Kuo-yu.

== Early life and education ==
Chou was born in Dalin Township, Chiayi County, on 12 October 1951. His father worked as a technician at the Dalin Sugar Refinery. After graduating from Chiayi County High School, he attended National Taiwan University, where he earned a bachelor's degree in political science in 1974 and a master's degree in political science in 1976.

== Early career ==
Chou started to work for the Legislative Yuan on 5 July 1976. He spent years in parliamentary affairs, serving under five premiers and seven secretaries-general. In 1989, he was promoted to be the chief of the Parliamentary Affairs section. In 1999, the section was upgraded to the Parliamentary Affairs Office, and he was promoted to become the director and consultant.
