= David Huang =

Taiwanese politician

Huang Shih-cho MLY
- 黃適卓
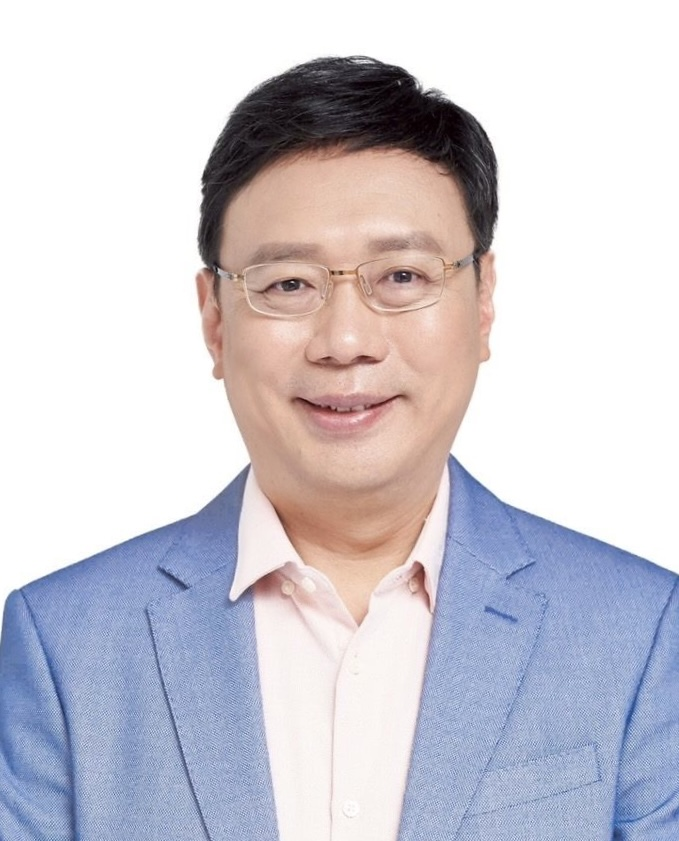
- Official portrait, 2023

20th Secretary-General of the Control Yuan
- Incumbent
- Assumed office 2 January 2026
- President: Lee Hung-chun
- Preceded by: Lee Chun-yi (Note: Wang Tseng-hua served as the Acting Secretary-General of the Control Yuan from 2 June 2025 to 2 January 2026.)

Member of the Legislative Yuan
- In office 1 February 2005 – 31 January 2008
- Constituency: Taipei II

Personal details
- Born: 14 August 1966 Chiayi City, Taiwan
- Party: Democratic Progressive Party (since 2007); Taiwan Solidarity Union (2001–2007)
- Parent(s): Huang Chu-wen (father); Huang Shu-ying (mother)
- Education: Chinese Culture University (BA); National Chengchi University (MA); University of Southern California (PhD)

Huang Shih-cho (Chinese: 黃適卓; born 14 August 1966), also known by his English name David Huang, is a Taiwanese politician and scholar of public administration who has served as the secretary-general of the Control Yuan since 2026.

He was the founding member of the Taiwan Solidarity Union, in which his father served as the chairman, but later left to join the Democratic Progressive Party.

== Early life and education ==
Huang was born in Chiayi in 1966. His mother was Huang Shu-ying and his father, Huang Chu-wen, was a politician.

Huang graduated from Chinese Culture University with a bachelor's degree in political science and earned a master's degree in public administration from National Chengchi University. He then completed doctoral studies in the United States at the University of Southern California, where he earned his Ph.D. in public policy from the Price School of Public Policy in 2001. His doctoral dissertation, completed under professor Chester A. Newland, was titled, "Taiwan's intergovernmental powers distribution: A historical and contextual analysis".

After receiving his doctorate, Huang taught at Tamkang University and the Kainan School of Management, then worked for the Examination Yuan. Huang also ran a consultancy firm.

== Political career ==
Huang was a founding member of the Taiwan Solidarity Union, and his father the party's first chairman. David Huang was a member of the Examination Yuan until launching a legislative campaign representing Taipei in 2004. Despite Democratic Progressive Party incumbent Shen Fu-hsiung actively supporting another DPP candidate, Huang managed to win a seat on the Legislative Yuan. Following his election, Huang was made TSU caucus leader. Huang spent most of his term opposing initiatives that he believed would increase Chinese influence on Taiwan. Huang stated on 5 November 2007 that he would leave the TSU if it did not reinstate expelled members Liao Pen-yen and Huang Chung-yuan. Two days later, he withdrew from the party to participate in a Democratic Progressive Party primary, which he lost to Tuan Yi-kang. The TSU then rescinded support of Huang's 2008 campaign. Huang spent the remainder of his legislative term as an independent. After stepping down from the legislature, Huang served as vice president of Kainan University. Huang was named a Democratic Progressive Party candidate for Taoyuan in preparation for the 2012 elections, and later became a DPP spokesman.
