= Lin Hsi-shan =

Politician from Taiwan

- 林錫山
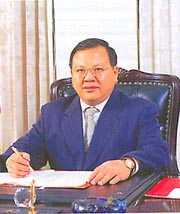

Secretary-General of the Legislative Yuan
- In office 1 March 1999 – 31 January 2016
- President: Wang Jin-pyng
- Deputy: Chester Chou; Wang Chuan-chong
- Preceded by: Liu Pi-liang
- Succeeded by: Lin Chih-chia

Member of the Legislative Yuan
- In office 1 February 1990 – 31 January 1999
- Constituency: Changhua County

Personal details
- Born: 17 March 1962 (age 64) Changhua County, Taiwan
- Party: Kuomintang
- Spouse: Liu Hsin-wei
- Education: Chinese Culture University (BS, MS)

Lin Hsi-shan (Chinese: 林錫山; pinyin: Lín Xīshān; born 17 March 1962) is a Taiwanese politician. He was the Secretary-General of Legislative Yuan from 1 March 1999 until 31 January 2016.

== Early life and education ==
Lin was born in Changhua County on 17 March 1962. He attended Chinese Culture University, where he earned a Master of Science (M.S.) in architecture and urban planning.

== Early career ==
Lin was elected as legislator for three consecutive terms in 1990-1999 during 1st to 3rd legislatures. During the term, he had been the convener for the Foreign Affairs and National Defense Committee, Economic Affairs Committee and Judiciary and Organic Laws and Statutes Committee; the member of Procedure Committee; the chairperson of the Judiciary and Economics Coordination Committees at the Legislative Yuan of Kuomintang (KMT); the senior deputy clerk of KMT (caucus) at Legislative Yuan; and deputy chief of KMT Coordination Committee at Legislative Yuan.

=== Secretary General ===
Lin was arrested in January 2016, as the Taipei Prosecutors Office suspected that the Legislative Yuan was favoring a certain computer company in negotiation for supply contracts. The contracts won by Far Net Technologies totaled NT$200 million, in return for over NT$10 million in kickbacks paid out to Lin. He was indicted on charges of corruption in May. The Taipei District Court ruled a year later that Lin was to serve sixteen years in prison. Upon appeal, the Taiwan High Court reduced Lin's sentence to fifteen years. Lin filed another appeal to the Supreme Court, which remanded the case to the High Court. The High Court found him guilty of ten offenses in a decision announced on 18 July 2019, and Lin reported to the Taipei District Prosecutors Office's Enforcement Section on 19 July 2019 to serve a 36-year sentence.

== Personal life ==
Lin is married to Liu Hsin-wei.
