= Shu Chin-chiang =

Taiwanese novelist and politician (born 1953)

- 蘇進強
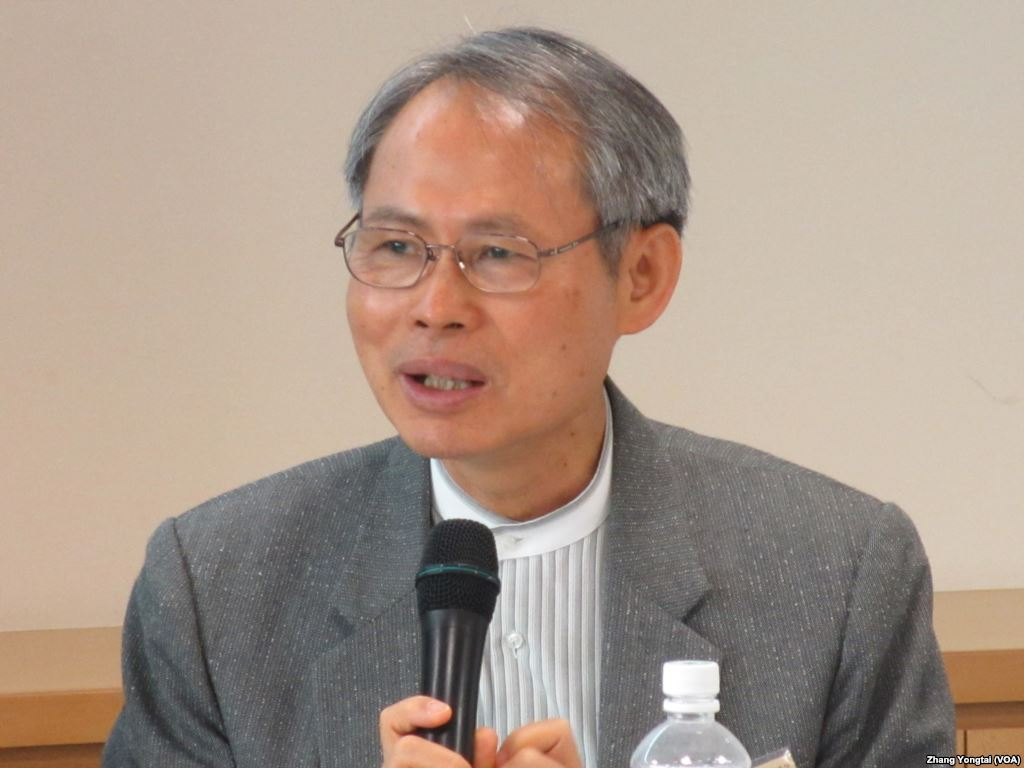
- Shu in 2014

Chairman of Taiwan Solidarity Union
- In office 10 January 2005 – 25 December 2006
- Preceded by: Huang Chu-wen; Huang Chung-yuan (acting)
- Succeeded by: Lin Chih-chia (acting); Huang Kun-huei

Personal details
- Born: 5 April 1953 (age 72) Baozhong, Yunlin, Taiwan
- Party: Taiwan Solidarity Union (2001-2014)
- Education: Republic of China Military Academy (BS); National Defense University (MS)
- Occupation: Politician
- Profession: Soldier; Novelist

Military service
- Allegiance: Republic of China
- Branch/service: Republic of China Army
- Rank: Colonel

Shu Chin-chiang (Chinese: 蘇進強; pinyin: Sū Jìnqiáng; Pe̍h-ōe-jī: So͘ Chìn-kiông; born 5 April 1953) is a Taiwanese novelist and politician. His pen name is "Lu Jiang" (履彊). He joined the Taiwan Solidarity Union in 2001 and served as party chairman from 2005 to 2006 before he was expelled in 2014 for renouncing Taiwanese independence.

== Political career ==
Shu was a military analyst at Nanhua University before being named a spokesman for the National Security Council. He then served as the secretary-general of the National Cultural Association. Upon the founding of the Taiwan Solidarity Union in August 2001, Shu was named party spokesperson and secretary-general.

=== TSU Chairmanship ===
In December 2004, Shu was reported as a possible candidate for the TSU chairmanship. Later that month, Shu officially declared his candidacy for the party chairmanship. Shu stepped down from his position at the National Cultural Association, where he was replaced by Tchen Yu-chiou, to declare his candidacy for the office.

Though an election was planned, the Taiwan Solidarity Union's central executive committee directly appointed Shu to the chairmanship on 10 January 2005.

==== Yasukuni Shrine visit controversy ====
In April 2005, Shu visited the controversial Yasukuni Shrine in Japan, incurring much criticism in Taiwan, as the shrine has posts for World War II war criminals. However, Shu said that his visit was not an endorsement of Japanese militarism, but an attempt to memorialize Taiwanese soldiers who had died while serving the Japanese during the era of occupation.

Shu resigned the party chairmanship on 25 December 2006, to take responsibility for the TSU's poor showing in the municipal elections.

=== Post-chairmanship ===
==== 2014 visit to mainland China ====
In February 2014, Shu and delegates led by Kuomintang Honorary Chairman Lien Chan, visited Beijing for three days, where they met with the head of Taiwan Affairs Office Zhang Zhijun and General Secretary of the Chinese Communist Party Xi Jinping. During the visit, Shu endorsed Lien as a champion for promoting cross-strait dialogue and advised the Democratic Progressive Party to seize this opportunity for change and to drop Taiwanese independence as a core value. His actions were viewed as seriously violating the core values of the TSU, and he was expelled from the party for making the trip to China.

==== New Homeland Think Tank Association ====
In 2023, Shu became chief executive officer of the New Homeland Think Tank Association, an organization affiliated with the Taiwan People's Party.
