= Huang Chung-yuan =

Taiwanese politician (born 1950)

Huang Chung-yuan MLY
- 黃宗源
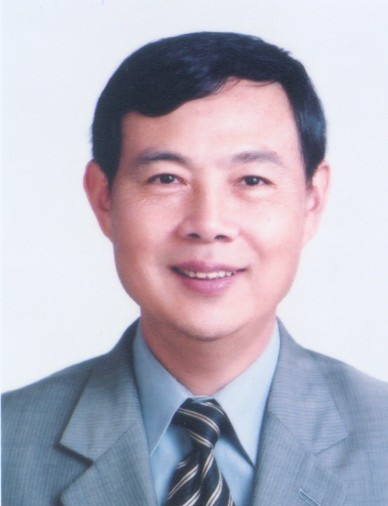

Chairperson of Taiwan Solidarity Union (acting)
- In office 25 December 2004 – 10 January 2005
- Preceded by: Huang Chu-wen
- Succeeded by: Shu Chin-chiang

Member of the Legislative Yuan
- In office 1 February 2005 – 31 January 2008
- Constituency: Taoyuan County
- In office 1 February 2002 – 31 January 2005
- Constituency: Republic of China

Personal details
- Born: 14 December 1950 (age 75) Taoyuan County, Taiwan
- Party: Democratic Progressive Party (since 2007)
- Other political affiliations: Taiwan Solidarity Union (2001–2007)
- Education: Chung Hua University (BS)

Huang Chung-yuan (Chinese: 黃宗源; pinyin: Huáng Zōngyuán; born 14 December 1950) is a Taiwanese politician. He was a member of the Taiwan Solidarity Union for most of his two-term stint in the Legislative Yuan and served the party as its acting chairman from December 2004 to January 2005. In 2007, Huang was expelled from the TSU and joined the Democratic Progressive Party.

== Early career ==
Huang attended Chung Hua University and served as president of the Industrial Park Manufacturers Federation.

== Political career ==
Huang represented the newly founded Taiwan Solidarity Union in the 2001 legislative elections, during which he was ranked first on the party's closed list. Upon taking office, he and the TSU mediated discussions between the Kuomintang and Democratic Progressive Party. By 2003, Huang was deputy caucus convener for the TSU and also deputy secretary-general for the party. He and four others formed a TSU working group to discuss SARS-related matters when an outbreak of the disease hit Taiwan that year. In 2004, Huang was TSU caucus whip. He assumed the party's acting chairmanship in December, and also ran for reelection to the Legislative Yuan, contesting a district seat from Taoyuan. In his stint as chairman, Huang attempted closer collaboration with the Democratic Progressive Party on electoral strategy and policy proposals. Huang declared support for Ker Chien-ming's candidacy for President of the Legislative Yuan, later joining the ticket as the Pan-Green Coalition's nominee for deputy speaker. Ker and Huang lost to Wang Jin-pyng and David Chung, the Pan-Blue Coalition's joint ticket. On 29 October 2007, Huang and Liao Pen-yen were expelled from the Taiwan Solidarity Union, and led others to consider leaving the party. He represented the Democratic Progressive Party in the 2008 legislative elections, and lost his seat to Yang Li-huan.

== Political stances ==
Huang is opposed to the economic integration of Taiwan and China, stating that, if made, such links must place both countries on equal ground.
