= Lin Chih-chia =

Taiwanese politician (born 1958)

- 林志嘉
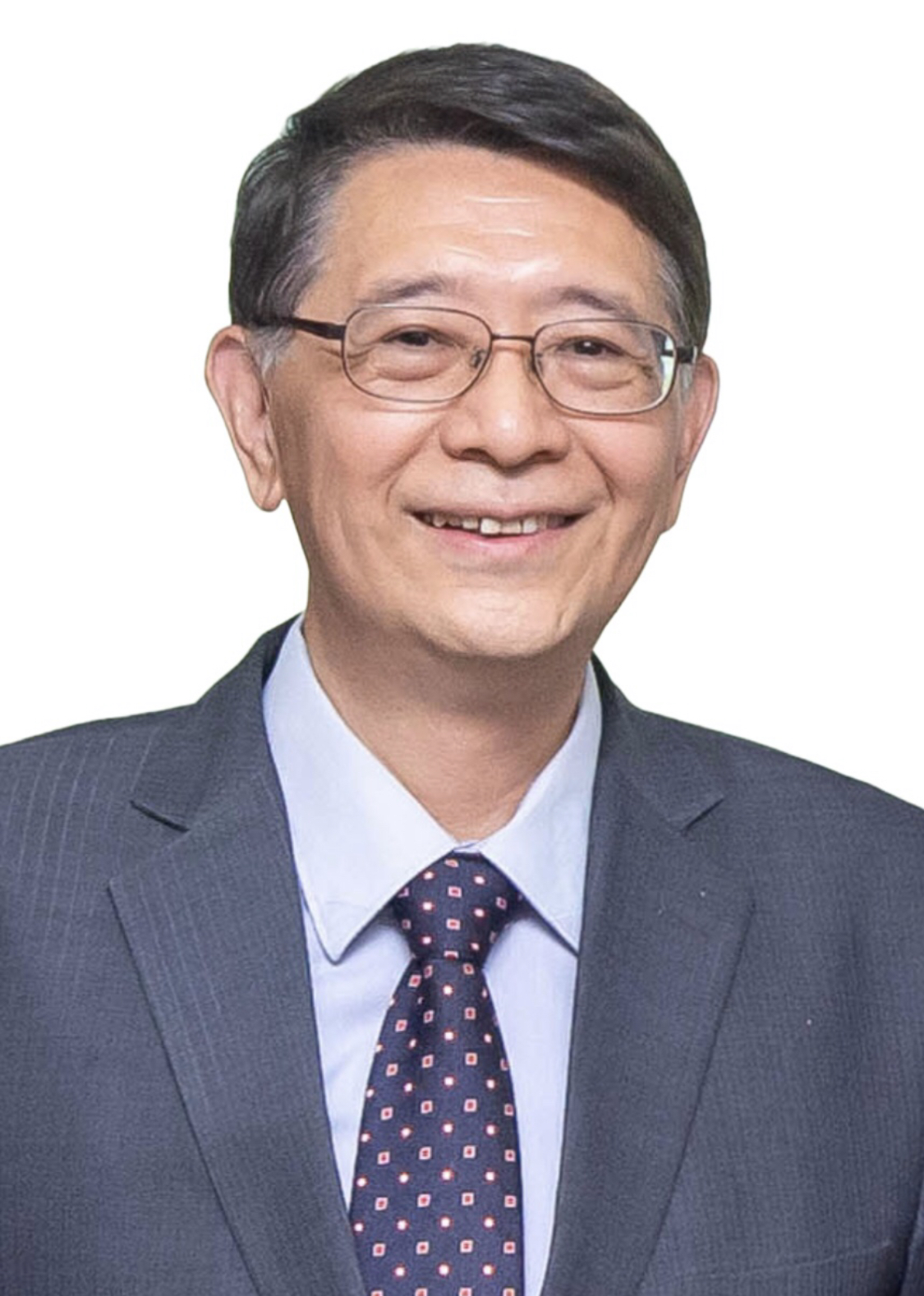
- Official portrait, 2023

19th Secretary-General of Legislative Yuan
- In office 1 February 2016 – 1 February 2024
- President: Su Jia-chyuan; Yu Shyi-kun
- Preceded by: Lin Hsi-shan
- Succeeded by: Chester Chou

Chairman of the Taiwan Solidarity Union
- Acting; 18 January 2016 – 16 April 2016
- Preceded by: Huang Kun-huei
- Succeeded by: Liu Yi-te
- Acting; 25 December 2006 – 26 January 2007
- Preceded by: Shu Chin-chiang
- Succeeded by: Huang Kun-huei

Member of the Legislative Yuan
- In office 2 March 2007 – 31 January 2008
- Preceded by: Huang Cheng-che
- Constituency: Party-list
- In office 1 February 1996 – 31 January 2002
- Constituency: Taipei County II
- In office 1 February 1993 – 31 January 1996
- Constituency: Taipei County
- In office 1 February 1990 – 31 January 1993

Personal details
- Born: 31 March 1958 (age 67) Wugu, Taipei County, Taiwan
- Political party: Taiwan Solidarity Union; Kuomintang (until 2001)
- Education: Fu Jen Catholic University (BS); University of Tennessee (MS)

Lin Chih-chia (Chinese: 林志嘉; pinyin: Lín Zhìjiā; born 31 March 1958) is a Taiwanese politician. He served as the secretary-general of the Legislative Yuan from 1 February 2016 to 1 February 2024.

== Education ==
Lin graduated in 1981 from Fu Jen Catholic University with a Bachelor of Science (B.S.) in chemistry. He then completed graduate studies in the United States, where he earned a Master of Science (M.S.) in 1987 from the University of Tennessee.
