= Huang Chu-wen =

Taiwanese politician

- 黃主文
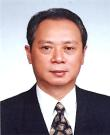

Chairman of Taiwan Solidarity Union
- In office 12 August 2001 – 25 December 2004
- Preceded by: Position created
- Succeeded by: Huang Chung-yuan (acting); Shu Chin-chiang

Minister of the Interior of the Republic of China
- In office 5 February 1998 – 20 May 2000
- Preceded by: Yeh Chin-fong
- Succeeded by: Chang Po-ya

Member of the Legislative Yuan
- In office 1 February 1983 – 31 January 1998

Personal details
- Born: 20 August 1941 (age 84) Minxiong, Tainan Prefecture, Taiwan, Empire of Japan
- Party: Taiwan Solidarity Union (since 2001)
- Other political affiliations: Kuomintang (before 2001)
- Spouse: Huang Shu-ying
- Children: David Huang
- Education: National Taiwan University (LLB)

Huang Chu-wen (Chinese: 黃主文; pinyin: Huáng Zhǔwén; born 20 August 1941) is a Taiwanese politician. He was the Minister of the Interior from 1998 to 2000.
