= Lin Chih-sheng (politician) =

Taiwanese politician

Lin Chih-sheng was a Taiwanese politician who represented the Taiwan Independence Party in the 2005 Taiwanese National Assembly election.
