= Lo Chih-ming =

Taiwanese engineer and politician (born 1957)

Lo Chih-ming MLY
- 羅志明

Member of the Legislative Yuan
- In office 1 February 2002 – 31 January 2008
- Succeeded by: Lin Yi-shih
- Constituency: Kaohsiung 2

Personal details
- Born: 13 November 1957 (age 68) Wanluan, Pingtung, Taiwan
- Party: Kuomintang (until 2001; since 2008); Taiwan Solidarity Union (2001–2007)
- Education: National Kaohsiung Normal University (BS); St. Cloud State University (MS); University of Iowa (PhD)
- Scientific career
- Fields: Industrial technology
- Thesis: A systematic model for developing technology education as the primary discipline for advancing technological literacy in general education in Taiwan, Republic of China (1991)

Lo Chih-ming (Chinese: 羅志明; pinyin: Luó Zhìmíng; born 13 November 1957) is a Taiwanese engineer and politician who served in the Legislative Yuan from 2002 to 2008.

== Education ==
After graduating from Kaohsiung Municipal Kaohsiung Senior High School, Lo studied at National Kaohsiung Normal University and received a bachelor's degree in industrial education. He then completed graduate studies in the United States, where he earned a Master of Science (M.S.) from St. Cloud State University and his Ph.D. in industrial education and industrial technology from the University of Iowa in 1991. His doctoral dissertation was titled, "A systematic model for developing technology education as the primary discipline for advancing technological literacy in general education in Taiwan, Republic of China".

== Political career ==
Lo served four terms in the Kaohsiung City Council as a member of the Kuomintang. He joined the Taiwan Solidarity Union upon its founding in 2001 to run for a legislative seat in Kaohsiung. In 2003, TSU legislator Su Ying-kuei was expelled from the party after charging Lo with illegal lobbying. Despite the accusations, Lo won reelection in 2004 by partnering with Democratic Progressive Party candidates during the campaign, and was named one of the TSU's four caucus whips at the start of his second term. In January 2005, Lo dropped out of a TSU chairmanship election, and Shu Chin-chiang was appointed to the position. After participating in an April 2005 protest, Lo was charged with violating the Assembly and Parade Law, and stepped down as whip until he was cleared. In February 2006, Lo declared his candidacy for the Kaohsiung mayoralty. As mayor, Lo said he would increase childcare subsidies, and expand the city's tourism industry. He also proposed an educational program that would offer elementary school textbooks for free. Chen Chu won the office, and Lo returned to the legislature. In his second reelection campaign, Lo originally stood as a Kaohsiung district incumbent, but was named one of the TSU's proportional representation candidates. Listed eighth on a closed party list, Lo was defeated. Shortly after the loss, he rejoined the Kuomintang.

After politics, Lo worked at the Xiamen subsidiary of a biotech company and led a property developer.

== Espionage allegation ==
In January 2023, Lo was arrested and questioned by prosecutors who alleged that he recruited retired admiral Hsia Fu-hsiang (夏復翔) and others into a mainland Chinese spy ring. A court in Kaohsiung released him on cash bail despite the investigators' request that he remain in custody. The Supreme Court acquitted Lo in October 2024.
