= Ho Min-hao =

Taiwanese politician

Mark Ho Ho Min-hao MLY
- 何敏豪

Member of the Legislative Yuan
- In office 1 February 2002 – 31 January 2008
- Constituency: Taichung

Personal details
- Born: 10 July 1958 (age 67) Taichung, Taiwan
- Party: Democratic Progressive Party (until 2001; since 2007)
- Other political affiliations: Taiwan Solidarity Union (2001–2007)
- Education: National Chung Hsing University (BA); Tunghai University (MPA)

Ho Min-hao (Chinese: 何敏豪; pinyin: Hé Mǐnháo; born 10 July 1958), also known by the English name Mark Ho, is a Taiwanese politician who served two terms in the Legislative Yuan between 2002 and 2008.

== Education ==
Ho earned a bachelor's degree from National Chung Hsing University and attended graduate school at Tunghai University.

== Political career ==
Ho served on the third National Assembly as a member of the Democratic Progressive Party, but switched affiliations to represent the newly founded Taiwan Solidarity Union in the 2001 legislative elections. During his first term, Ho was a member of the Legislative Yuan's National Defense Committee. Near the start of his second term, the Taiwan Solidarity Union named Ho one of its caucus whips. He was named the TSU candidate for the mayoralty of Taichung in April 2005, and reelected as one of four TSU caucus whips in June. Incumbent Taichung mayor Jason Hu retained his office, and Ho was later named a member of the Taiwan Solidarity Union's Central Executive Committee. Ho rejoined the Democratic Progressive Party in November 2007, after defeating Wang Shih-hsun in a public opinion poll used to determine the Pan-Green Coalition's legislative candidate, and lost his legislative seat to Daniel Huang.
