= Taiwan Defense Alliance =

Taiwanese political party

The Taiwan Defense Alliance (Chinese: 保護台灣大聯盟; pinyin: Bǎohù Táiwān Dà Liánméng) is a political party that appeared in Taiwan on 19 August 2004. It has called for the United States, which it considers the lawful occupier of Taiwan at the end of Pacific Theater of World War II, to take over Taiwan and include it as part of the U.S. defense system.

== See also ==
- Taiwan independence
- Democratic Progressive Party
