= Taiwan Solidarity Party =

Political party in Taiwan

Taiwan Solidarity Party 台聯黨
- Leader: Chou Ni-an
- Founded: 12 August 2001
- Split from: Kuomintang (Taiwanese nationalist factions)
- Headquarters: Taipei, Taiwan
- Membership: 500+
- Ideology: Conservatism (Taiwanese); Right-wing populism Taiwan independence Anti-communism; Anti–Chinese nationalism Historical: Progressivism (Taiwanese) Left-wing populism
- Political position: Right-wing Historical: Left-wing with centre-left to far-left factions
- Domestic affiliation: Pan-Green Coalition
- Legislative Yuan: 0 / 113
- Municipal mayors: 0 / 6
- Magistrates/mayors: 0 / 16
- Councilors: 3 / 912
- Township/city mayors: 0 / 204

Website
- https://www.tsu.org.tw/
- Politics of Taiwan; Political parties; Elections; a: The TSU had also been less commonly described as centrist.

Taiwan Solidarity Party
- Traditional Chinese: 臺聯黨
- Simplified Chinese: 台联党
Transcriptions
Standard Mandarin
- Hanyu Pinyin: Táilián Dǎng
Hakka
- Pha̍k-fa-sṳ: Thòi-lièn Tóng
Southern Min
- Hokkien POJ: Tâi-liân Tóng
- Tâi-lô: Tâi-liân Tóng

Taiwan Solidarity Union (until June 2025)
- Traditional Chinese: 臺灣團結聯盟
- Simplified Chinese: 台湾团结联盟
Transcriptions
Standard Mandarin
- Hanyu Pinyin: Táiwān Tuánjié Liánméng
Hakka
- Pha̍k-fa-sṳ: Thòi-vàn Thòn-kiet Lièn-mèn
Southern Min
- Hokkien POJ: Tâi-oân Thoân-kiat Liân-bêng
- Tâi-lô: Tâi-uân Thuân-kiat Liân-bîng

The Taiwan Solidarity Party (TSP or TSU) (Note: In local languages: Traditional Chinese script: 台聯黨; Mandarin Pinyin: Táilián Dǎng; Hokkien: Tâi-Liân-Tóng; Sixian Hakka: Thòi-Lièn-Tóng) is a political party in Taiwan which advocates Taiwan independence, and is affiliated with the Taiwanese localization movement. It was officially founded on 12 August 2001 as the Taiwan Solidarity Union (TSU) and is considered part of the Pan-Green Coalition. Unlike the Democratic Progressive Party, its larger companion party in the Pan-Green Coalition, the TSP actively campaigns for the creation of a de jure Republic of Taiwan.

== History ==
In the summer of 2001, supporters of former President Lee Teng-hui formed the Taiwan Solidarity Union. In the 2000 presidential elections, the Kuomintang (KMT) suffered a devastating defeat, in which internal turmoil had caused the party to lose its grip on power. This was blamed on Lee, the KMT Chairman at the time, and he was forced to resign in March 2001. The hardliners in the KMT, as well as the supporters of James Soong recently expelled from the KMT, believed Lee secretly harbored support for Taiwan independence and had purposely sabotaged the KMT (by not allowing Soong to run under the KMT) in order to allow Chen Shui-bian, the Democratic Progressive Party (DPP) candidate, to win. Meanwhile, after winning the presidential election, Chen Shui-bian moderated his pro-independence position, alienating some hardline independence supporters in the DPP. By July, just months before the December 2001 elections to the Legislative Yuan, these factors accumulated to result in the formation of the TSU to continue Lee's policies, and fill the void in Taiwanese politics caused by the DPP's abandonment of its strongly pro-independence political stance. It was hoped that this would lead to a pan-green majority in the nation's primary legislative body, thus giving the executive branch, under Chen, the political backing necessary to pursue policies supportive of Taiwanese independence.

The party name and emblem were announced on 25 July 2001, and was officially founded on 12 August.

The TSU's stated political aim is the advocacy of the creation of a Republic of Taiwan and a policy of desinicization which consists of eliminating the symbols and concepts which connect Taiwan to the idea of China. The TSU argues that any lingering connection with the concept of China renders Taiwan an "abnormal nation" and that clearly separating Taiwan from China is necessary to prevent Taiwan from being dominated by an enemy and foreign nation. The TSU has also strongly advocated the creation of a new constitution for Taiwan and the abandonment of "Republic of China" as Taiwan's formal name.

Lee was, naturally, identified as the "spiritual leader" (though he personally never joined the party); the TSU hoped that Lee's popularity would help the TSU make the 5% support mark. Further, Lee's dominance in the party was revealed when the candidates TSU nominated had all been personally approved by Lee beforehand. Meanwhile, as Lee's actions increasingly departed from the KMT's unificationist positions, he was eventually expelled from the Kuomintang. Although there was some initial speculation that Lee's expulsion would cause mass defections in the Kuomintang, none of the major Kuomintang leaders or Lee's close associates changed sides. Nonetheless, former members of the KMT were still to be the fundamental building blocks of the new party, with half of TSU candidates coming directly from the KMT.

After winning nine seats in the 225-member Legislative Yuan in December 2001, the TSU has largely displaced the Taiwan Independence Party (TAIP) as the strongly pro-Taiwan-independence political force and the TSU legislators began advocating relevant resolutions. For instance, they have opened the debates about changing the national flag and national anthem. In the 2002 Taiwanese municipal elections in Taipei and Kaohsiung, TSU fielded no mayoral candidate, and it suffered a defeat in winning no seats in the Taipei City council and won only two seats in the Kaohsiung City council.

== Political position ==
The TSU was once described as left-wing progressive, but now supports right-wing conservative policies. The TSU is politically conservative and opposed to transgender rights. TSU's socially conservative stance sets it apart from other progressive Pan-Green political parties.

The TSU endorsed Donald Trump at 2020 United States presidential election. After Trump won the 2024 United States presidential election, TSU's party leader Chou Ni-an expressed a favorable view of Trump, saying "the TSU is the closest party to the Republican Party within Taiwan".

The TSU is also described as "ultranationalist" due to its strong anti-Chinese sentiment.

== Yasukuni Shrine visit ==
The visit to the Yasukuni Shrine by TSU chairman Shu Chin-chiang in April 2005 generated a controversy across the political spectrum and further made their party goals more ambiguous to the voters. However, the TSU has made it clear that it would achieve its goal of total independence by all means. Chairman Shu denied the visit should be seen as support for militarism, and claimed it was a goodwill gesture to Japan to further strengthen the security of the Pacific region. Chairman Su also emphasized that there is a need to remind the Taiwanese public that the People's Republic of China is aiming 700 missiles towards Taiwan and that Japan would be an important ally if China were inclined to invade.

Chairman Shu's visit, however, gave opportunity to aboriginal legislator Kao Chin Su-mei to gain publicity by protesting with her supporters at the chairman's arrival at the Chiang Kai-Shek International Airport, now renamed Taiwan Taoyuan International Airport. Later on the TSU press conference was disrupted by an angry mob from the members of pro-unification Patriot Association who showed their disagreement and dissatisfaction by throwing eggs at the conference building. The DPP, the ruling party, kept a low profile in this controversy and attempts to distance itself from the incident.

== Current status ==
The TSU and its pan-green partner, the DPP, suffered defeat in the December 2005 local elections and failed to win any municipal mayoral or county magistrate seats. Its representation in the Legislative Yuan was eliminated by the 2008 election when it failed to win any district-contested seats and failed to gain the 5% threshold for proportional representation.

In the 2012 legislative elections, the TSU won 8.98% of the popular vote and earned three representatives to the Legislative Yuan, renewing its status as a credible third party in Taiwanese government. The 2016 legislative elections saw the TSU win 2.51% of all votes, which was insufficient for representation. The latest loss lead to the resignation of party chairman Huang Kun-huei. Shortly after, all of the party's workforce was laid off.

In June 2025, the Taiwan Solidarity Union changed its name to the Taiwan Solidarity Party to lessen confusion between it and non-political organizations such as societies, clubs, and labor unions.

== Election results ==
=== Legislative elections ===
Election	Total seats won	Total votes	Share of votes	Outcome of election	Election leader
2001	13 / 225	801,560	8.5%	▲13 seats; Minority governing coalition (Pan-Green)	Huang Chu-wen
2004	12 / 225	756,712	8.28%	▼1 seats; Minority governing coalition (Pan-Green)	Huang Chu-wen
2008	0 / 113	344,887	3.5%	▼12 seats; No seats	Huang Kun-huei
2012	3 / 113	1,178,896	8.96%	▲3 seats; Opposition coalition (Pan-Green)	Huang Kun-huei
2016	0 / 113	305,675	2.51%	▼3 seats; No seats	Huang Kun-huei
2020	0 / 113	50,435	0.36%	; No seats	Liu Yi-te
2024	0 / 113	43,372	0.31%	; No seats	Liu Yi-te

=== Local elections ===
Election	Mayors & Magistrates	Councils	Third-level Municipal heads	Third-level Municipal councils	Fourth-level Village heads	Election Leader
2001-2002	0 / 23	7 / 897	0 / 319	—N/a	—N/a	Huang Chu-wen
2002 municipalities only	0 / 2	2 / 96	—N/a	—N/a	—N/a	Huang Chu-wen
2005	0 / 23	11 / 901	0 / 319	—N/a	—N/a	Shu Chin-chiang
2006 municipalities only	0 / 2	3 / 96	—N/a	—N/a	—N/a	Huang Kun-huei
2009	0 / 17	3 / 587	0 / 211	—N/a	—N/a	Huang Kun-huei
2010 municipalities only	0 / 5	2 / 314	—N/a	—N/a	0 / 3,757	Huang Kun-huei
2014 unified	0 / 22	9 / 906	0 / 204	0 / 2,137	1 / 7,836	Huang Kun-huei

=== National Assembly elections ===
Election	Total seats won	Total votes	Share of votes	Outcome of election	Election leader
2005	21 / 300	273,147	7.05%	▲21 seats; Opposition (Rejecting amendments)	Shu Chin-chiang

== Chairperson ==
- Huang Chu-wen (12 August 2001 – 25 December 2004)
- Huang Chung-yuan (25 December 2004 – 10 January 2005) (acting)
- Shu Chin-chiang (10 January 2005 – 25 December 2006)
- Lin Chih-chia (25 December 2006 – 26 January 2007) (acting)
- Huang Kun-huei (26 January 2007 – 18 January 2016)
- Lin Chih-chia (18 January 2016 – 16 April 2016) (acting)
- Liu Yi-te (16 April 2016 – 29 January 2024)
- Chou Ni-an (29 January 2024 – present)

== See also ==
- List of political parties in Taiwan
- Formosa Alliance
