= Opinion polling for the 2020 Taiwanese general election =

This is a list of nationwide public opinion polls that have been conducted relating to the general election for the 2020 Taiwanese general election. The persons named in the polls are declared candidates or have received media speculation about their possible candidacy.

== Presidential election ==
Rating figures are in percentages.

=== Graphical summary ===
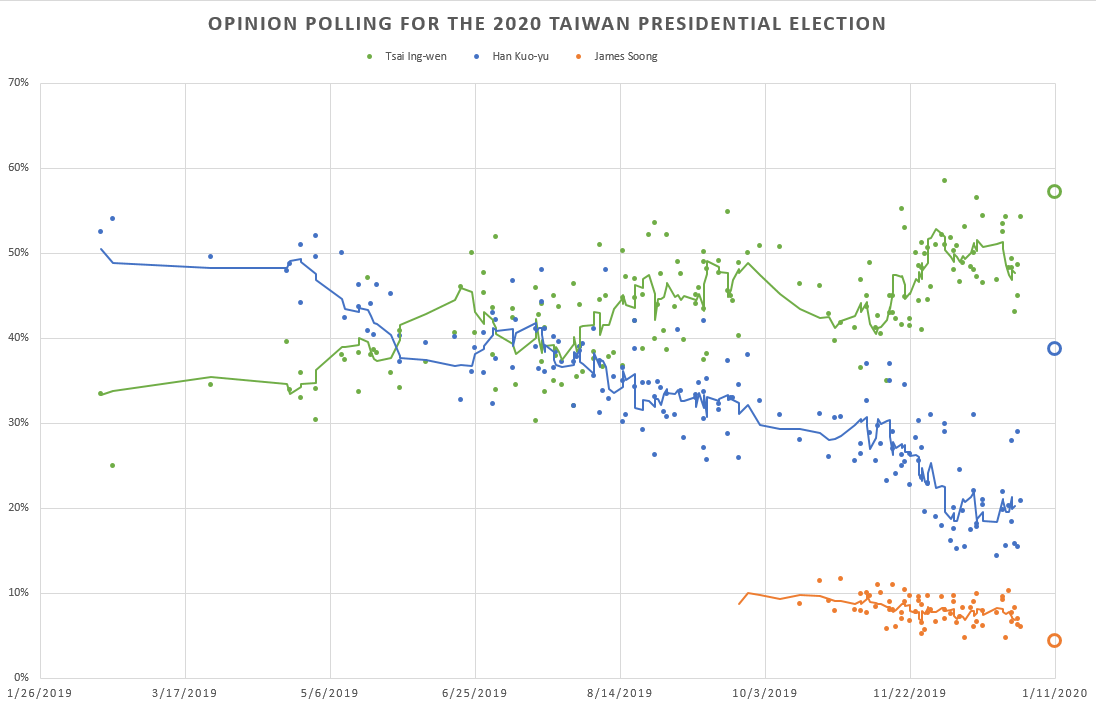
Opinion pollings of the 2020 Taiwanese presidential election between Tsai Ing-wen, Han Kuo-yu and James Soong.

=== Polls with candidates ===
Han–Soong–Tsai

Date	Pollster	Sample size	Han Kuo-yu KMT	James Soong PFP	Tsai Ing-wen DPP
30 December 2019	Green Party	1,044	20.8	6	54.2
26 December 2019	Formosa	1,072	20.3	10.3	48.2
17 December 2019	Green Party	1,022	20.4	7.9	54.4
15 December 2019	ETtoday	1,074	18.1	9.9	56.5
14 December 2019	United Daily	1,110	22	9	48
11 December 2019	Green Party	1,021	15.47	4.66	53.2
8 December 2019	ETtoday	2,875	24.5	7.2	46.6
4 December 2019	Green Party	1,021	17.9	9.5	52.1
26 November 2019	Formosa	1,071	23.7	5.2	51.2
26 November 2019	PinView	2,192	23.6	6.5	40.9
25 November 2019	ETtoday	2,308	30.3	9.5	44.4
20 November 2019	Green Party	1,048	25.4	8.9	44.9
19 November 2019	PinView	2,157	25.0	6.9	41.6
18 November 2019	Apple Daily	1,084	24.0	6.0	42.3
12 November 2019	Formosa	1,070	27.5	10.0	40.5

Han–Tsai

Date	Pollster	Sample size	Han Kuo-yu KMT	Tsai Ing-wen DPP
26 November 2019	PinView	2,192	24.5	42.9
25 November 2019	ETtoday	2,308	32.0	45.6
19 November 2019	PinView	2,157	25.7	42.6
12 November 2019	PinView	2,172	25.1	41.2
12 November 2019	Formosa	1,070	31.4	49.0
7 November 2019	ETtoday	4,451	33.7	45.7
7 November 2019	TVBS	1,187	40	49
5 November 2019	China Times	1,120	25.9	37.8
5 November 2019	PinView	2,182	27.7	39.6
29 October 2019	PinView	2,149	25.1	40.3
29 October 2019	Green Party	1,112	32.8	44.3
26 October 2019	United Daily	1,204	30	42
23 October 2019	TVBS	1,209	39	52
22 October 2019	PinView	2,175	28.2	40.1
18 October 2019	Formosa	1,072	32.5	51.6
17 October 2019	China Times	1,109	24.1	34.4
16 October 2019	Focus	1,072	31.3	48.7
15 October 2019	CNEWS	1,153	27.3	43.3
15 October 2019	PinView	2,169	27.9	40.5
8 October 2019	Green Party	1,010	31.0	50.7
1 October 2019	Green Party	1,021	32.6	50.9
27 September 2019	TVBS	1,083	38	50
24 September 2019	PinView	2,167	25.9	40.3
24 September 2019	Green Party	2,167	34.5	48.8
22 September 2019	Apple Daily	2,167	32.9	44.4
21 September 2019	Formosa	1,085	33	45
20 September 2019	United Daily	1,154	37.3	45.5
20 September 2019	CNews	1,085	28.7	54.8
17 September 2019	Green Party	787	32.3	49.1
17 September 2019	Formosa	1,073	31.6	47.7
13 September 2019	SETN	1,075	35.2	48.1
13 September 2019	China Times	1,344	25.7	38.1
12 September 2019	TVBS	1,294	42	49
10 September 2019	ETtoday	3,302	27.1	43.4
9 September 2019	Formosa	–	25.4	57.2
24 August 2019	TPOF	1,085	34.7	52.1
22 July 2019	TPOF	1,089	40.1	45.0
22 July 2019	China Times	1,102	36.5	34.9
1 July 2019	Apple Daily	1,093	42.1	33.9
1 July 2019	UDN	1,087	43.0	38.0
25 Jun 2019	Apple Daily	1,076	38.8	40.6
24 Jun 2019	TVBS	1,674	36.0	50.0
19 Jun 2019	Green Party	–	32.7	46.0
18 Jun 2019	Apple Daily	1,086	40.1	40.6
1 Jun 2019	CCS	1,823	39.4	37.2
28 May 2019	Formosa	1,086	37.2	40.8
19 May 2019	Apple Daily	1,080	40.4	38.6
16 May 2019	Fount Media	1,075	46.2	38.3
15 May 2019	United Daily	1,103	44.0	38.0
13 May 2019	EtToday	2,875	43.7	33.7
11 May 2019	Apple Daily	1,077	42.4	37.4
8 May 2019	TVBS	951	50.0	38.0
30 April 2019	China Times	1,004	49.6	30.4
29 April 2019	TVBS	1,090	52.0	34.0
25 April 2019	Formosa	1,068	44.1	35.9
25 April 2019	TVBS	1,222	51.0	33.0
21 April 2019	TPOF	1,072	47.9	39.6
17 April 2019	Formosa	1,078	48.7	33.9
26 March 2019	Formosa	1,072	49.5	34.5
5 March 2019	Fount Media	1,077	54.9	31.6
20 February 2019	TVBS	1,382	54.0	25.0
16 February 2019	Apple Daily	1,087	52.5	33.4
20 December 2018	Taiwan Brain Trust	1,072	48.7	32.3

=== Polls with previous potential candidates ===
Ko–Han–Tsai

Date	Pollster	Sample size	Ko Wen-je Ind.	Han Kuo-yu KMT	Tsai Ing-wen DPP
9 September 2019	Formosa	–	21.0	19.7	44.1
24 August 2019	TPOF	1,085	22.6	28.7	41.3
9 July 2019	ETtoday	2,271	16.5	38.4	33.0
9 July 2019	Trend poll	3,000	23.8	41.7	21.5
9 July 2019	Apple Daily	3,019	23.0	36.3	22.8
8 July 2019	You Media	2,501	25.0	31.0	30.3
8 July 2019	Landscape poll	1,079	25.0	37.0	26.1
5 July 2019	Trend poll	1,283	25.0	38.4	25.5
4 July 2019	TIP	1,071	21.2	35.7	26.7
2 July 2019	Green Party	1,433	27.2	29.6	34.4
2 July 2019	Apple Daily	1,093	23.1	35.8	24.0
1 July 2019	UDN	1,087	26	35	22
1 July 2019	You Media	2,498	26.9	27.1	31.0
28 June 2019	Trend poll	1,068	20.4	33.4	31.9
28 June 2019	Formosa	1,071	18.8	28.5	35.7
25 Jun 2019	Apple Daily	1,076	22.9	33.7	26.7
24 Jun 2019	TPOF	1,092	27.5	29.4	36.9
24 Jun 2019	TVBS	1,674	20.0	29.0	37.0
22 June 2019	Trend poll	1,109	25.5	29.8	33.9
21 June 2019	ETtoday	5,051	19.5	31.9	36.6
20 Jun 2019	China Times	1,113	22.7	36.4	24.8
20 Jun 2019	New Exhibition	1,099	26.0	28.1	31.8
19 Jun 2019	Green Party	–	26.0	28.1	31.8
19 Jun 2019	TISP	1,093	22.9	31.4	28.0
18 Jun 2019	ETtoday	4,047	24.1	31.0	31.6
18 Jun 2019	Apple Daily	1,086	25.5	32.7	27.4
17 Jun 2019	You Media	1,081	29.9	27.1	27.8
15 Jun 2019	Trend Poll	1,086	23.7	26.2	38.3
13 Jun 2019	Green Party Taiwan	2,426	23.4	22.9	37.9
13 Jun 2019	DPP primaries	15,000	22.7	24.5	35.7
11 Jun 2019	ETtoday	5,957	25.3	31.4	29.7
11 Jun 2019	Apple Daily	1,761	27.6	30.4	30.0
8 Jun 2019	Year poll	1,166	24.6	27.9	31.3
8 Jun 2019	New Exhibition	1,070	24.7	28.0	30.6
6 Jun 2019	CSPA	1,068	26.9	33.3	27.0
6 Jun 2019	Trend Poll	1,081	25.7	32.1	30.9
5 Jun 2019	Sanli News	1,100	23.6	30.1	24.6
2 Jun 2019	Apple Daily	1,084	24.3	34.2	24.8
1 Jun 2019	CCS	1,823	25.7	29.5	25.5
28 May 2019	Formosa	1,086	29.3	27.9	26.9
19 May 2019	Apple Daily	1,080	25.2	33.7	25.6
16 May 2019	Fount Media	1,075	25.4	36.9	26.7
15 May 2019	United Daily	1,103	32.0	31.0	22.0
13 May 2019	EtToday	2,875	23.5	38.5	23.8
11 May 2019	Apple Daily	1,077	22.7	34.3	28.3
8 May 2019	TVBS	951	26.0	39.0	25.0
30 April 2019	China Times	1,004	25.0	41.1	20.9
29 April 2019	TVBS	1,090	25.0	42.0	23.0
25 April 2019	Formosa	1,068	24.1	32.3	24.5
25 April 2019	TVBS	1,222	25.0	42.0	22.0
21 April 2019	ETtoday	7,868	23.0	38.9	27.8
21 April 2019	UDN	1,178	26.0	36.0	20.0
21 April 2019	TPOF	1,072	27.9	35.8	27.5
17 April 2019	Formosa	1,078	22.9	37.8	24.8
2 April 2019	Fount Media	1,079	30.1	37.4	22.3
26 March 2019	Formosa	1,072	27.8	35.4	22.6
5 March 2019	China Times	2,026	22.9	31.9	15.6
5 March 2019	Fount Media	1,077	28.3	42.1	20.3
20 February 2019	TVBS	1,382	35.0	37.0	16.0
18 February 2019	EtToday	1,072	30.6	38.0	19.7
16 February 2019	Apple Daily	1,087	28.6	35.1	22.0
20 December 2018	Taiwan Brain Trust	1,072	38.2	31.0	19.2

Gou–Tsai

Date	Pollster	Sample size	Terry Gou KMT/Ind.	Tsai Ing-wen DPP
1 July 2019	Apple Daily	1,093	43.8	26.1
1 July 2019	UDN	1,087	45	30
25 Jun 2019	Apple Daily	1,076	33.8	36.9
24 Jun 2019	TVBS	1,674	35.0	45.0
19 Jun 2019	Green Party	–	33.6	38.2
1 Jun 2019	CCS	1,823	40.1	37.0
28 May 2019	Formsa	1,086	37.3	37.7
19 May 2019	Apple Daily	1,080	40.7	33.5
16 May 2019	Fount Media	1,075	48.8	34.4
15 May 2019	United Daily	1,103	46.0	33.0
13 May 2019	EtToday	2,875	42.9	31.7
11 May 2019	Apple Daily	1,077	37.4	37.4
8 May 2019	TVBS	951	43.0	36.0
30 April 2019	China Times	1,004	45.6	30.3
29 April 2019	TVBS	1,090	44.0	35.0
25 April 2019	Formosa	1,068	37.1	35.9
25 April 2019	TVBS	1,222	44.0	33.0
17 April 2019	Formosa	1,078	48.2	32.1
17 April 2019	IPO	1,068	50.2	27.1
2 May 2017	CTW	825	35.7	24.2

Chu–Tsai

Date	Pollster	Sample size	Eric Chu KMT	Tsai Ing-wen DPP
1 Jun 2019	CCS	1,823	38.2	36.8
19 May 2019	Apple Daily	1,080	38.2	36.8
11 May 2019	Apple Daily	1,077	37.6	36.3
8 May 2019	TVBS	951	40.0	40.0
29 April 2019	TVBS	1,090	41.0	35.0
25 April 2019	TVBS	1,222	40.0	33.0
26 March 2019	Formosa	1,072	40.8	35.8
5 March 2019	Fount Media	1,077	50.0	34.9
22 February 2019	TPOF	1,089	46.5	37.9
20 February 2019	TVBS	1,382	46.0	27.0
16 February 2019	Apple Daily	1,087	50.2	33.6
27 December 2018	UDN	1,186	56.0	22.0
20 December 2018	Taiwan Brain Trust	1,072	53.6	27.8
14 December 2018	TVBS	834	50.0	23.0

Wang–Tsai

Date	Pollster	Sample size	Wang Jin-pyng KMT	Tsai Ing-wen DPP
1 Jun 2019	CCS	1,823	23.5	39.7
27 May 2019	Apple Daily	1,081	25.2%	38.2%
19 May 2019	Apple Daily	1,080	25.5	37.4
11 May 2019	Apple Daily	1,077	26.9	38.3
8 May 2019	TVBS	951	27.0	39.0
29 April 2019	TVBS	1,090	27.0	35.0
25 April 2019	TVBS	1,222	28.0	34.0
5 March 2019	Fount Media	1,077	43.3	34.2
20 February 2019	TVBS	1,382	39.0	26.0
16 February 2019	Apple Daily	1,087	39.6	34.6

Ma–Tsai

Date	Pollster	Sample size	Ma Ying-jeou KMT	Tsai Ing-wen DPP
14 December 2018	TVBS	834	37.0	29.0

Chang–Tsai

Date	Pollster	Sample size	Chang San-cheng Ind.	Tsai Ing-wen DPP
14 December 2018	TVBS	834	34.0	27.0

Wu–Tsai

Date	Pollster	Sample size	Wu Den-yih KMT	Tsai Ing-wen DPP
20 February 2019	TVBS	1,382	27.0	32.0
20 December 2018	Taiwan Brain Trust	1,072	29.4	41.4
14 December 2018	TVBS	834	26.0	34.0

Ko–Chu–Tsai

Date	Pollster	Sample size	Ko Wen-je Ind.	Eric Chu KMT	Tsai Ing-wen DPP
24 June 2019	TPOF	1,092	27.5	29.4	36.9
22 June 2019	Trend poll	1,109	26.9	21.0	32.9
14 June 2019	Trend poll	1,086	25.4	21.9	37.3
6 June 2019	Trend poll	1,081	31.4	23.5	31.2
1 Jun 2019	CCS	1,823	28.0	24.9	25.2
28 May 2019	Trend poll	1,145	29.6	30.0	31.9
22 May 2019	Trend poll	1,077	25.2	26.7	34.9
19 May 2019	Apple Daily	1,080	28.2	26.8	25.1
8 May 2019	TVBS	951	33.0	26.0	24.0
29 April 2019	TVBS	1,090	33.0	26.0	23.0
25 April 2019	TVBS	1,222	33.0	26.0	22.0
21 April 2019	ETtoday	7,868	28.8	24.7	27.8
21 April 2019	UDN	1,178	34.0	25.0	20.0
2 April 2019	Fount Media	1,079	35.9	30.1	22.7
26 March 2019	Formosa	1,072	32.4	24.6	23.2
5 March 2019	China Times	2,026	25.7	31.0	12.2
22 February 2019	TPOF	1,089	35.1	25.6	24.3
20 February 2019	TVBS	1,382	41.0	29.0	16.0
18 February 2019	EtToday	1,072	34.7	32.9	19.8
16 February 2019	Apple Daily	1,087	32.4	31.8	23.6
22 January 2019	TVBS	1,398	36.0	30.0	15.0
15 January 2019	NCCU	1,120	38.7	21.5	15.3
27 December 2018	UDN	1,186	45.0	30.0	11.0
24 December 2018	Formosa	1,074	33.3	27.2	22.8
20 December 2018	Taiwan Brain Trust	1,072	34.3	29.5	28.2

Ko–Wang–Tsai

Date	Pollster	Sample size	Ko Wen-je Ind.	Wang Jin-pyng KMT	Tsai Ing-wen DPP
1 Jun 2019	CCS	1,823	34.7	13.2	25.8
19 May 2019	Apple Daily	1,080	32.9	14.3	26.4
8 May 2019	TVBS	951	38.0	15.0	23.0
29 April 2019	TVBS	1,090	38.0	14.0	22.0
25 April 2019	TVBS	1,222	37.0	15.0	22.0
21 April 2019	ETtoday	7,868	33.5	9.4	28.0
21 April 2019	UDN	1,178	39.0	13.0	19.0
20 February 2019	TVBS	1,382	41.0	23.0	17.0
16 February 2019	Apple Daily	1,087	40.1	20.5	21.6
22 January 2019	TVBS	1,398	38.0	22.0	15.0

Ko–Gou–Tsai

Date	Pollster	Sample size	Ko Wen-je Ind.	Terry Gou KMT	Tsai Ing-wen DPP
9 July 2019	ETtoday	2,271	15.1	34.8	31.7
9 July 2019	Trend poll	3,000	21.0	31.1	21.3
9 July 2019	Apple Daily	3,019	21.0	27.4	21.3
8 July 2019	You Media	2,501	19.8	29.2	26.0
8 July 2019	Landscape poll	1,079	20.9	31.4	24.9
5 July 2019	Trend poll	1,283	24.1	28.8	19.9
4 July 2019	TIP	1,071	18.1	30.9	23.3
2 July 2019	Green Party	1,433	25.0	27.3	32.4
2 July 2019	Apple Daily	1,093	21.4	32.5	20.1
1 July 2019	UDN	1,087	24	31	19
1 July 2019	You Media	2,498	18.7	28.4	29.7
28 June 2019	Trend poll	1,068	19.8	25.6	31.2
28 June 2019	Formosa	1,071	18.5	24.7	33.3
25 Jun 2019	Apple Daily	1,076	21.0	27.3	25.2
24 Jun 2019	TVBS	1,674	21.0	24.0	35.0
22 June 2019	Trend poll	1,109	24.5	20.7	32.4
21 June 2019	ETtoday	5,051	14.9	31.9	35.0
20 Jun 2019	China Times	1,113	21.5	29.2	24.3
20 Jun 2019	New Exhibition	1,099	25.8	23.1	30.6
19 Jun 2019	Green Party	–	25.8	23.1	30.6
19 Jun 2019	TISP	1,093	22.3	23.1	28.0
18 Jun 2019	ETtoday	4,047	18.2	35.2	30.5
18 Jun 2019	Apple Daily	1,086	25.8	27.8	25.4
11 Jun 2019	ETtoday	5,957	28.4	35.4	13.2
11 Jun 2019	Apple Daily	1,761	28.2	23.9	28.7
2 Jun 2019	Apple Daily	1,084	26.8	26.1	25.9
1 Jun 2019	CCS	1,823	25.4	28.4	26.1
28 May 2019	Formsa	1,086	30.4	23.8	26.4
19 May 2019	Apple Daily	1,080	25.0	30.2	23.7
16 May 2019	Fount Media	1,075	27.2	34.1	26.4
15 May 2019	United Daily	1,103	31.0	29.0	21.0
13 May 2019	EtToday	2,875	23.3	35.3	23.1
11 May 2019	Apple Daily	1,077	23.6	27.6	28.4
8 May 2019	TVBS	951	30.0	31.0	24.0
29 April 2019	TVBS	1,090	28.0	33.0	21.0
25 April 2019	Formosa	1,068	26.4	23.1	25.5
25 April 2019	TVBS	1,222	28.0	31.0	22.0
21 April 2019	ETtoday	7,868	22.7	35.8	27.1
21 April 2019	UDN	1,178	27.0	31.0	20.0
17 April 2019	Formosa	1,078	24.3	34.1	24.7
17 April 2019	IPO	1,068	25.2	35.6	20.2
2 April 2019	Fount Media	1,079	33.1	33.1	24.1

Tsai–Gou–Chu

Date	Pollster	Sample size	Tsai Ing-wen DPP	Terry Gou Ind.	Eric Chu KMT
17 May 2017	Taiwan Style Foundation	1,271	37.6	30.1	15.3

Ko–Wu–Tsai

Date	Pollster	Sample size	Ko Wen-je Ind.	Wu Den-yih KMT	Tsai Ing-wen DPP
20 February 2019	TVBS	1,382	44.0	16.0	20.0
22 January 2019	TVBS	1,398	45.0	13.0	17.0
27 December 2018	UDN	1,186	54.0	12.0	14.0
20 December 2018	Taiwan Brain Trust	1,072	53.3	14.1	19.1

Ko–Wu–Lai

Date	Pollster	Sample size	Ko Wen-je Ind.	Wu Den-yih KMT	William Lai DPP
20 February 2019	TVBS	1,382	39.0	15.0	26.0
22 January 2019	TVBS	1,398	43.0	11.0	21.0
27 December 2018	UDN	1,186	50.0	11.0	23.0
20 December 2018	Taiwan Brain Trust	1,072	43.5	11.9	34.4

Chu–Lai

Date	Pollster	Sample size	Eric Chu KMT	William Lai DPP
19 May 2019	Apple Daily	1,080	35.9	38.3
11 May 2019	Apple Daily	1,077	34.7	42.2
8 May 2019	TVBS	951	37.0	43.0
29 April 2019	TVBS	1,090	36.0	41.0
25 April 2019	TVBS	1,222	36.0	39.0
26 March 2019	Formosa	1,072	38.2	40.6
19 March 2019	TPOF	1,073	34.1	53.1
20 February 2019	TVBS	1,382	41.0	33.0
16 February 2019	Apple Daily	1,087	43.8	39.4
27 December 2018	UDN	1,186	47.0	32.0
20 December 2018	Taiwan Brain Trust	1,072	43.8	41.0
14 December 2018	TVBS	834	40.0	39.0

Wang–Lai

Date	Pollster	Sample size	Wang Jin-pyng KMT	William Lai DPP
19 May 2019	Apple Daily	1,080	20.7	45.2
11 May 2019	Apple Daily	1,077	19.8	46.4
8 May 2019	TVBS	951	25.0	44.0
29 April 2019	TVBS	1,090	22.0	42.0
25 April 2019	TVBS	1,222	24.0	41.0
20 February 2019	TVBS	1,382	31.0	33.0
16 February 2019	Apple Daily	1,087	34.1	44.5

Han–Lai

Date	Pollster	Sample size	Han Kuo-yu KMT	William Lai DPP
28 May 2019	Formsa	1,086	36.3	40.8
19 May 2019	Apple Daily	1,080	40.3	40.3
16 May 2019	Fount Media	1,075	43.0	42.4
15 May 2019	United Daily	1,103	40.0	39.0
13 May 2019	EtToday	2,875	43.4	30.5
11 May 2019	Apple Daily	1,077	40.1	39.7
8 May 2019	TVBS	951	48.0	40.0
30 April 2019	China Times	1,004	47.2	32.9
29 April 2019	TVBS	1,090	50.0	37.0
25 April 2019	Formosa	1,068	40.8	39.3
25 April 2019	TVBS	1,222	50.0	36.0
21 April 2019	TPOF	1,072	41.7	46.2
17 April 2019	Formosa	1,078	46.4	37.5
26 March 2019	Formosa	1,072	45.5	39.8
19 March 2019	TPOF	1,073	41.5	48.7
20 February 2019	TVBS	1,382	49.0	32.0
16 February 2019	Apple Daily	1,087	49.4	36.9
20 December 2018	Taiwan Brain Trust	1,072	43.5	41.6

Ma–Lai

Date	Pollster	Sample size	Ma Ying-jeou KMT	William Lai DPP
14 December 2018	TVBS	834	31.0	45.0

Chang–Lai

Date	Pollster	Sample size	Chang San-cheng Ind.	William Lai DPP
14 December 2018	TVBS	834	26.0	47.0

Gou–Lai

Date	Pollster	Sample size	Terry Gou KMT	William Lai DPP
28 May 2019	Formsa	1,086	34.8	39.4
19 May 2019	Apple Daily	1,080	36.4	37.6
16 May 2019	Fount Media	1,075	43.1	40.0
15 May 2019	United Daily	1,103	43.0	36.0
13 May 2019	EtToday	2,875	42.6	28.7
11 May 2019	Apple Daily	1,077	32.3	43.5
8 May 2019	TVBS	951	42.0	40.0
30 April 2019	China Times	1,004	43.0	33.1
29 April 2019	TVBS	1,090	42.0	38.0
25 April 2019	Formosa	1,068	34.7	39.6
25 April 2019	TVBS	1,222	42.0	37.0
17 April 2019	Formosa	1,078	44.6	38.6
17 April 2019	IPO	1,068	42.6	33.6

Wu–Lai

Date	Pollster	Sample size	Wu Den-yih KMT	William Lai DPP
20 February 2019	TVBS	1,382	22.0	41.0
20 December 2018	Taiwan Brain Trust	1,072	19.9	60.3
14 December 2018	TVBS	834	18.0	53.0

Ko–Chu–Lai

Date	Pollster	Sample size	Ko Wen-je Ind.	Eric Chu KMT	William Lai DPP
19 May 2019	Apple Daily	1,080	28.0	26.0	27.1
8 May 2019	TVBS	951	33.0	27.0	25.0
29 April 2019	TVBS	1,090	33.0	25.0	24.0
25 April 2019	TVBS	1,222	32.0	26.0	23.0
21 April 2019	ETtoday	7,868	31.8	25.4	19.7
21 April 2019	UDN	1,178	34.0	23.0	23.0
2 April 2019	Fount Media	1,079	34.9	27.4	26.4
26 March 2019	Formosa	1,072	32.8	24.8	25.1
19 March 2019	TPOF	1,073	30.3	22.0	38.0
5 March 2019	China Times	2,026	24.8	27.5	13.8
22 February 2019	TPOF	1,089	34.1	23.7	30.4
20 February 2019	TVBS	1,382	39.0	27.0	19.0
16 February 2019	Apple Daily	1,087	31.2	30.0	25.8
22 January 2019	TVBS	1,398	33.0	29.0	21.0
27 December 2018	UDN	1,186	42.0	28.0	18.0
24 December 2018	Formosa	1,074	33.3	27.2	22.8
20 December 2018	Taiwan Brain Trust	1,072	34.3	29.5	28.2

Ko–Wang–Lai

Date	Pollster	Sample size	Ko Wen-je Ind.	Wang Jin-pyng KMT	William Lai DPP
19 May 2019	Apple Daily	1,080	33.7	12.7	28.0
8 May 2019	TVBS	951	37.0	13.0	24.0
29 April 2019	TVBS	1,090	37.0	12.0	24.0
25 April 2019	TVBS	1,222	36.0	14.0	24.0
21 April 2019	ETtoday	7,868	37.1	9.4	19.5
21 April 2019	UDN	1,178	39.0	11.0	24.0
20 February 2019	TVBS	1,382	38.0	21.0	23.0
16 February 2019	Apple Daily	1,087	38.3	19.0	26.5
22 January 2019	TVBS	1,398	37.0	21.0	21.0

Ko–Han–Lai

Date	Pollster	Sample size	Ko Wen-je Ind.	Han Kuo-yu KMT	William Lai DPP
13 June 2019	DPP primaries	15,000	27.4	23.5	27.4
2 Jun 2019	Apple Daily	1,084	25.0	33.7	25.3
28 May 2019	Formsa	1,086	31.6	28.4	23.4
19 May 2019	Apple Daily	1,080	24.6	33.6	27.8
16 May 2019	Fount Media	1,075	25.4	36.3	25.4
15 May 2019	United Daily	1,103	33.0	31.0	23.0
13 May 2019	EtToday	2,875	26.9	38.6	18.6
11 May 2019	Apple Daily	1,077	24.8	32.2	26.6
8 May 2019	TVBS	951	27.0	39.0	24.0
30 April 2019	China Times	1,004	25.4	40.1	21.1
29 April 2019	TVBS	1,090	25.0	41.0	23.0
25 April 2019	Formosa	1,068	24.3	32.3	26.1
25 April 2019	TVBS	1,222	25.0	41.0	24.0
21 April 2019	ETtoday	7,868	26.9	39.3	18.2
21 April 2019	UDN	1,178	26.0	36.0	21.0
21 April 2019	TPOF	1,072	27.8	31.1	33.2
17 April 2019	Formosa	1,078	21.7	37.3	27.5
2 April 2019	Fount Media	1,079	27.6	35.4	27.5
26 March 2019	Formosa	1,072	28.3	32.1	26.8
19 March 2019	TPOF	1,073	26.0	29.9	36.5
5 March 2019	China Times	2,026	23.2	31.0	16.6
22 February 2019	TPOF	1,089	28.4	34.2	30.0
20 February 2019	TVBS	1,382	33.0	36.0	19.0
16 February 2019	Apple Daily	1,087	24.3	37.7	25.4
20 December 2018	Taiwan Brain Trust	1,072	31.8	29.2	30.5

Ko–Gou–Lai

Date	Pollster	Sample size	Ko Wen-je Ind.	Terry Gou KMT	William Lai DPP
28 May 2019	Formsa	1,086	32.6	22.1	24.9
19 May 2019	Apple Daily	1,080	26.4	28.2	26.3
16 May 2019	Fount Media	1,075	26.4	34.4	27.4
15 May 2019	United Daily	1,103	31.0	28.0	23.0
13 May 2019	EtToday	2,875	26.3	35.2	18.1
11 May 2019	Apple Daily	1,077	26.6	23.7	29.4
8 May 2019	TVBS	951	30.0	31.0	24.0
29 April 2019	TVBS	1,090	28.0	31.0	24.0
25 April 2019	Formosa	1,068	28.2	23.0	26.2
25 April 2019	TVBS	1,222	27.0	30.0	24.0
21 April 2019	ETtoday	7,868	26.5	35.7	18.3
21 April 2019	UDN	1,178	28.0	30.0	22.0
17 April 2019	Formosa	1,078	23.4	32.2	28.1
17 April 2019	IPO	1,068	25.8	32.6	23.0
2 April 2019	Fount Media	1,079	31.5	31.5	28.6

Ko–Wu–Lai

Date	Pollster	Sample size	Ko Wen-je Ind.	Wu Den-yih KMT	William Lai DPP
20 February 2019	TVBS	1,382	39.0	15.0	26.0
22 January 2019	TVBS	1,398	43.0	11.0	21.0
27 December 2018	UDN	1,186	50.0	11.0	23.0
20 December 2018	Taiwan Brain Trust	1,072	43.5	11.9	34.4

== Legislative election ==
Graph of opinion polls conducted. Trend lines represent local regressions.

=== Party vote ===
Date	Source	DPP	KMT	PFP	NPP	NP	Green	SDP	TSU	MKT	NPSU	Trees	CUP	TPP	TSP	Other	Undecided	Lead
31 Dec 2019	Apple Daily	32.0%	19.6%	4.3%	6.7%	-	-	-	-	-	-	-	-	10.2%	3.9%	3.8%	19.5%	2.4
30 Dec 2019	Liberty Times	23.0%	15.7%	1.8%	5.9%	-	1.6%	-	-	-	-	-	-	7.5%	3.6%	6.2%	35.5%	6.3
30 Dec 2019	Formosa	32.6%	18.7%	1.5%	2.9%	-	-	-	-	-	-	-	-	3.4%	-	9.5%	30.7%	4.9
30 Dec 2019	ETtoday	30.4%	24.8%	3.0%	7.6%	1.0%	1.9%	-	-	-	-	-	-	11.0%	-	20.3%	-	5.6
30 Dec 2019	TPOF	33.6%	26.0%	3.5%	4.5%	-	-	-	-	-	-	-	-	5.1%	-	4.9%	15.3%	7.6
30 Dec 2019	Green Party	30.2%	20%	3.1%	3.8%	-	3.4%	-	-	-	-	-	-	5.8%	3.2%	-	30.5%	10.2
27 Dec 2019	SGM	31.7%	23.3%	4.3%	6.1%	-	1.7%	-	-	-	-	-	-	9.1%	3.5%	-	-	8.4
26 Dec 2019	Formosa	32.4%	22.5%	3.5%	7.2%	1.0%	3.1%	-	0.6%	-	-	-	-	9.6%	3.4%	1.8%	-	9.9
26 Dec 2019	Liberty Times	34.02%	15.79%	1.40%	6.17%	0.47%	-	-	-	-	-	-	-	7.38%	-	6.17%	30.37%	8.23
19 Dec 2019	TSP	44.4%	23.6%	3.1%	8.2%	-	2.0%	-	-	-	-	-	-	10.2%	5.9%	2.6%	-	11.2
16 Dec 2019	Apple Daily	29.3%	19.6%	3.0%	6.9%	-	-	-	-	-	-	-	-	9.9%	-	6.6%	24.7%	9.7
12 Dec 2019	ETtoday	28.8%	27.7%	2.6%	6.9%	0.7%	1.4%	-	-	-	-	-	-	12.6%	-	19.2%	-	1.1
7 Dec 2019	UDN	30%	24%	3%	3%	-	-	-	-	-	-	-	-	8%	-	4%	29%	6
7 Dec 2019	BrainTrust^{10}	30.6%	18.9%	3.7%	7.0%	0.6%	2.4%	-	0.2%	0.5%	-	-	-	11.5%	0.7%	1.0%	22.7%	11.7
4 Dec 2019	Green Party	31.9%	22.0%	2.9%	7.0%	-	1.0%	-	-	-	-	-	-	11.5%	2.0%	1.0%	-	9.9
4 Dec 2019	TNC	36.9%	19.8%	4.2%	6.6%	-	-	-	-	-	-	-	-	10.6%	-	5.4%	16.5%	7.1
3 Dec 2019	Fountmedia	28.3%	25.7%	2.3%	5.7%	-	2.5%	-	-	-	-	-	-	8.7%	1.6%	1.3%	23.8%	2.5
29 Nov 2019	Formosa	29.8%	20.7%	0.7%	2.3%	-	-	-	-	-	-	-	-	3.9%	-	9.5%	32.3%	9.1
28 Nov 2019	Liberty Times	32.56%	17.23%	0.94%	3.75%	0.09%	-	-	-	-	-	-	-	7.77%	-	4.31%	33.33%	15.35
28 Nov 2019	ETtoday	32.3%	27.9%	4.7%	4.8%	1.3%	1.3%	-	-	-	-	-	-	10.4%	-	-	17.2%	4.4
27 Nov 2019	Green Party	33.9%	27.9%	4.3%	6.5%	-	2.2%	-	-	-	-	-	-	9.8%	1.8%	-	13.8%	6.0
26 Nov 2019	UP Media^{9}	34.7%	25.9%	4.2%	2.7%	1.4%	1.1%	-	0.1%	0.3%	-	-	-	6.0%	1.3%	0.5%	21.7%	8.8
26 Nov 2019	PinView	23.6%	22.9%	2.8%	3.7%	0.9%	1.4%	-	0.2%	-	-	-	0.1%	7.6%	1.4%	-	26.5%	0.7
25 Nov 2019	WUFI	31.8%	35.6%	5.4%	5.9%	-	1.6%	-	-	-	-	-	-	13.9%	3.8%	2.2%	-	3.8
23 Nov 2019	Apple Daily	31.2%	24.2%	3.5%	5.0%	-	-	-	-	-	-	-	-	10.1%	-	26.0%		7.0
25 Nov 2019	ETtoday	32.3%	27.9%	4.7%	4.8%	1.3%	1.3%	-	-	-	-	-	-	10.4%	-	17.2%		4.4
23 Nov 2019	INA News	38.25%	32.06%	4.78%	4.72%	1.57%	2.08%	-	-	-	-	-	-	12.50%	2.92%	1.01%	-	4.15
20 Nov 2019	Green Party	28.4%	28.2%	3.6%	4.1%	1.2%	1.6%	-	-	-	-	-	-	11.1%	-	1.3%	-	0.2
19 Nov 2019	PinView	27.0%	22.7%	2.6%	3.6%	-	-	-	-	-	-	-	-	7.4%	-	-	-	4.3
18 Nov 2019	UDN	29%	29%	4%	3%	1%	1%	-	-	-	-	-	-	8%	-	1%	25%	0.0
18 Nov 2019	Apple Daily	26.5%	25.2%	2.9%	7.5%	-	-	-	-	-	-	-	-	10.1%	-	2.1%	25.7%	1.3
15 Nov 2019	TVBS	23%	33%	4%	7%	0.6%	0.5%	-	0.2%	-	-	-	-	12%	-	1.2%	20%	10
14 Nov 2019	WWCTMG	22.0%	25.2%	2.3%	5.9%	-	-	-	-	-	-	-	-	7.5%	-	-	-	3.2
14 Nov 2019	PinView	23.5%	24.6%	1.6%	3.1%	-	-	-	-	-	-	-	-	6.1%	-	-	-	1.1
11 Nov 2019	ETtoday	31.7%	33.2%	3.2%	8.0%	1.2%	1.4%	-	-	-	-	-	-	14.3%	-	7.0%	-	1.5
7 Nov 2019	TVBS	25%	37%	2%	7%	0.9%	0.3%	-	0.8%	-	-	-	-	10%	-	1.1%	16%	12
5 Nov 2019	WWCTMG	24.2%	29.7%	1.2%	4.5%	-	-	-	-	-	-	-	-	4.7%	-	-	-	5.5
Oct 2019	TPOF	29.7%	29.1%	-	5.6%	-	-	-	-	-	-	-	-	10.9%	-	3.8%	22.0%	0.6
29 Oct 2019	Formosa	25.5%	20.7%	0.2%	2.0%	-	-	-	-	-	-	-	-	3.3%	-	12.3%	36.2%	4.8
29 Oct 2019	PinView	23.8%	25.4%	1.1%	3.6%	-	-	-	-	-	-	-	-	4.9%	-	37.2%		1.6
27 Oct 2019	ETtoday	31.4%	36.2%	1.2%	5.0%	0.5%	0.9%	-	-	-	-	-	-	20.5%	-	4.3%	-	4.8
23 Oct 2019	TVBS	25%	37%	2%	8%	0.8%	0.8%	-	0.2%	-	-	-	-	12%	-	1.5%	12%	12
21 Oct 2019	CNEWS^{8}	27.2%	29.2%	1.6%	5.3%	0.8%	1.3%	-	0.7%	0.1% (CPA)	-	-	-	9.6%	0.7%	1.5%	22.1%	2
17 Oct 2019	PinView	24.0%	27.2%	1.0%	2.9%	-	-	-	-	-	-	-	-	5.7%	-	39.2%		3.2
16 Sep 2019	NCAP^{7}	25.3%	28.6%	1.9%	6.4%	0.3%	0.8%	-	0.1%	-	-	-	-	8.2%	1.2%	0.5%	26.6%	9.5
8 Oct 2019	Green Party	31.6%	38.3%	0.9%	6.5%	-	2.0%	-	-	-	-	-	-	8.3%	1.0%	-	11.5%	6.7
1 Oct 2019	Green Party	25.1%	34.5%	-	2.2%	-	1.8%	-	-	-	-	-	-	12.1%	1.2%	-	27.1%	9.4
1 Oct 2019	Formosa	28.9%	24.2%	0.3%	1.6%	-	-	-	-	-	-	-	-	2.1%	-	11.7%	31.4%	4.7
29 Sep 2019	ETtoday	31.0%	34.8%	1.7%	5.0%	1.4%	-	-	0.4%	-	-	-	-	19.9%	-	5.9%	-	3.8
27 Sep 2019	TVBS	22%	31%	-	5%	-	-	-	-	-	-	-	-	10%	-	13%	19%	9
25 Sep 2019	NCAP^{6}	23.3%	32.8%	1.9%	6.9%	0.4%	1.8%	-	0.2%	-	-	-	-	8.0%	1.4%	0.3%	22.9%	9.5
24 Sep 2019	Green Party	27.1%	37.5%	0.7%	6.9%	-	1.9%	-	-	-	-	-	-	9.4%	1.4%	-	15.0%	10.4
17 Sep 2019	Green Party	25.1%	33.1%	1.7%	8.4%	-	2.1%	-	-	-	-	-	-	8.9%	3.1%	-	14.9%	8.0
10 Sep 2019	ETtoday	27.6%	35.6%	1.7%	4.4%	0.9%	-	-	0.2%	-	-	-	-	20.4%	-	9.1%	-	8.0
4 Sep 2019	Green Party	24.7%	38.3%	1.5%	6.3%	-	2.0%	-	-	-	-	-	-	9.6%	2.9%	-	14.3%	13.6
Aug 2019	TPOF	30.2%	29.6%	-	6.7%	-	-	-	-	-	-	-	-	8.1%	-	6.5%	17.8%	0.6
30 Aug 2019	TVBS	22%	27%	-	6%	-	-	-	-	-	-	-	-	6%	-	7%	31%	5
30 Aug 2019	Formosa	28.9%	24.4%	0.1%	1.7%	-	-	-	-	-	-	-	-	5.4%	-	11.5%	28.1%	4.5
29 Aug 2019	ETtoday	26.4%	33.0%	1.7%	4.4%	1.2%	-	-	1.0%	-	-	-	-	24.0%	-	8.3%	-	6.6
16 Aug 2019	TVBS	22%	27%	-	4%	-	-	-	-	-	-	-	-	8%	-	12%	26%	5
13 Aug 2019	NCAP	23.7%	35.3%	-	7.2%	-	-	-	-	-	-	-	-	9.8%	1.2%	1.8%	22.0%	3.6
12 Aug 2019	TVBS	27.0%	30.0%	-	5.0%	-	-	-	-	-	-	-	-	8.0%	-	10.0%	23.0%	3
6 Aug 2019	Green Party	24.9%	36.6%	1.8%	8.0%	-	2.1%	-	-	-	-	-	-	12.5%	2.2%	4.3%	11.8%	11.7
7 Aug 2019	TCF	30.5%	27.2%	2.3%	4.7%	0.7%	1.0%	-	1.3% (Formosa)	-	1.1%	-	-	15.5%	0.7%	2.9%	12.7%	3.3
30 Jul 2019	Formosa	26.5%	23.4%	0.2%	4.2%	-	-	-	-	-	-	-	-	(Note: Ineligible to run)	-	11.9%	34.1%	3.1
20 Jul 2019	TVBS	22%	33%	-	10%	-	-	-	-	-	-	-	-	(Note: Ineligible to run)	-	7%	27%	11
4 Jul 2019	Green Party	31.7%	34.8%	2.9%	13.5%	-	1.5%	-	0.7%	-	-	-	-	(Note: Ineligible to run)	-	15.0%		3.1
4 Jul 2019	Trend Poll	19.9%	41.3%	-	12.2%	-	-	-	-	-	-	-	-	(Note: Ineligible to run)	-	11.9%	14.7%	21.4
28 Jun 2019	Formosa	27.0%	23.7%	0.1%	3.6%	-	-	-	-	-	-	-	-	(Note: Ineligible to run)	-	10.2%	36.6%	2.7
25 Jun 2019	Trend Poll	25.0%	35.5%	-	13.9%	-	-	-	-	-	-	-	-	(Note: Ineligible to run)	-	9.0%	16.6%	10.5
22 June 2019	TVBS	25%	28%	-	11%	-	-	-	-	-	-	-	-	(Note: Ineligible to run)	-	10%	26%	3
19 Jun 2019	Green Party	25.7%	32.0%	3.0%	16.9%	-	1.2%	-	0.4%	-	-	-	-	(Note: Ineligible to run)	-	3.3%	17.4%	6.3
18 Jun 2019	Trend Poll	28.3%	31.3%	-	11.9%	-	-	-	-	-	-	-	-	(Note: Ineligible to run)	-	10.0%	18.5%	3.0
14 Jun 2019	Trend Poll	29.0%	25.5%	-	17.2%	-	-	-	-	-	-	-	-	(Note: Ineligible to run)	-	12.5%	15.8%	3.5
9 Jun 2019	Green Party	29.0%	32.5%	1.8%	14.4%	-	1.3%	-	-	-	-	-	-	(Note: Ineligible to run)	-	3.6%	17.4%	3.5
6 Jun 2019	Trend Poll	24.0%	30.6%	-	17.5%	-	-	-	-	-	-	-	-	(Note: Ineligible to run)	-	10.1%	17.8%	6.6
28 May 2019	Formosa	25.6%	25.4%	0.3%	4.1%	-	-	-	-	-	-	-	-	(Note: Ineligible to run)	-	8.5%	36.4%	0.2
28 May 2019	Trend Poll	23.4%	38.2%	-	15.5%	-	-	-	-	-	-	-	-	(Note: Ineligible to run)	-	8.9%	14.0%	15.2
22 May 2019	Trend Poll	27.3%	29.8%	-	18.0%	-	-	-	-	-	-	-	-	(Note: Ineligible to run)	-	9.8%	15.7%	2.5
16 May 2019	Fount Media	26.8%	35.3%	1.4%	9.2%	1.1%	-	0.7%	0.4%	-	-	-	-	(Note: Ineligible to run)	0.4%	0.7%	24.3%	8.5
8 May 2019	TVBS	22%	32%	-	11%	-	-	-	-	-	-	-	-	(Note: Ineligible to run)	-	8%	27%	10
29 Apr 2019	Formosa	24.4%	25.5%	0.3%	3.5%	-	-	-	0.0%	-	-	-	-	(Note: Ineligible to run)	-	9.4%	37.1%	1.1
29 Apr 2019	TVBS	22%	31%	-	9%	-	-	-	-	-	-	-	-	(Note: Ineligible to run)	-	8%	31%	9
2 Apr 2019	Focus	23.4%	35.3%	1.9%	10.2%	0.9%	0.4%	0.4%	0.6%	-	-	-	0.1%	(Note: Ineligible to run)	-	-	27.0%	11.9
1 Apr 2019	Formosa	21.4%	26.0%	0.2%	3.1%	-	-	-	0.1%	-	-	-	-	(Note: Ineligible to run)	-	12.1%	37.4%	4.6
19 Mar 2019	Taiwan Real Survey	18.7%	30.5%	1.7%	8.4%	0.7%	0.0%	-	0.2%	0.2%	-	-	-	(Note: Ineligible to run)	-	-	39.5%	11.8
5 Mar 2019	Focus	22.4%	41.0%	1.6%	9.0%	1.1%	0.1%	-	0.3%	-	-	-	-	(Note: Ineligible to run)	-	0.1%	24.5%	18.6
25 Feb 2019	Formosa	20.4%	24.8%	0.5%	3.5%	-	-	-	0.2%	-	-	-	-	(Note: Ineligible to run)	-	11.8%	39.1%	4.4
20 Feb 2019	TVBS	17%	29%	-	11%	-	-	-	-	-	-	-	-	(Note: Ineligible to run)	-	12%	32%	12
16 Feb 2019	Apple Daily	25.6%	31.9%	-	-	-	-	-	-	-	-	-	-	(Note: Ineligible to run)	-	7.7%	34.8%	6.3
29 Jan 2019	Formosa	20.1%	23.3%	0.6%	3.4%	-	-	-	0.1%	-	-	-	-	(Note: Ineligible to run)	-	11.2%	41.5%	3.2
25 Jan 2019	The MKT merges into the Congress Party Alliance" (Note: Ineligible to run)													(Note: Ineligible to run)				
11 Jan 2019	Taiwan Real Survey	14.9%	31.3%	1.4%	9.0%	1.4%	1.4%	-	0.2%	0.3%	-	-	-	(Note: Ineligible to run)	-	-	40.1%	16.4
7 Jan 2019	ESC NCCU^{5}	18.1%	30.4%	0.6%	2.7%	0.3%	0.5%	0.2%	0.1%	0.2%	0.1%	0.0%	0.2%	(Note: Ineligible to run)	0.3%	0.1%	46.2%	12.3
24 Dec 2018	Formosa	18.4%	25.4%	0.3%	3.1%	-	-	-	0.1%	-	-	-	-	(Note: Ineligible to run)	-	11.0%	40.1%	7.0
23 Dec 2018	ESC NCCU^{4}	17.7%	28.4%	0.7%	4.3%	0.3%	0.2%	0.1%	0.0%	0.2%	0.0%	0.2%	-	(Note: Ineligible to run)	0.2%	0.1%	47.6%	10.7
20 Dec 2018	Taiwan Brain Trust	20.5%	30.0%	-	17.0%	-	-	-	-	-	-	-	-	(Note: Ineligible to run)	-	4.7%	27.8%	9.5
24 Nov 2018	2018 local elections^{b}	20.2%	26.3%	0.6%	1.6%	0.4%	0.3%	0.2%	0.4%	0.2%	0.5%	0.1%	0.0%	(Note: Ineligible to run)	0.3%	14.0%	34.9%	6.1
30 Sep 2018	ESC NCCU^{3}	18.8%	26.3%	1.3%	3.3%	0.4%	0.6%	0.1%	0.0%	0.2%	0.4%	0.1%	0.0%	(Note: Ineligible to run)	0.1%	0.2%	48.4%	7.4
14 Sep 2018	Taiwan Real Survey	19.2%	30.8%	1.7%	5.3%	0.9%	1.0%	-	0.5%	0.3%	-	-	-	(Note: Ineligible to run)	-	-	40.2%	11.6
1 Sep 2018	Taiwan Real Survey	16.5%	21.8%	1.3%	4.7%	0.6%	1.1%	-	1.1%	0.7%	-	-	-	(Note: Ineligible to run)	-	-	52.2%	5.3
13 Aug 2018	Taiwan Real Survey	16.4%	21.3%	2.4%	6.8%	0.8%	1.2%	-	0.7%	0.1%	-	-	-	(Note: Ineligible to run)	-	-	50.4%	4.9
24 Jul 2018	Taiwan Real Survey	14.6%	23.1%	2.9%	6.0%	0.5%	0.8%	-	0.3%	0.1%	-	-	-	(Note: Ineligible to run)	-	-	51.7%	8.5
31 Jun 2018	Taiwan Brain Trust	23.2%	30.2%	-	13.5%	-	-	-	-	-	-	-	-	(Note: Ineligible to run)	-	5.9%	27.2%	7
12 Jun 2018	ESC NCCU	19.7%	26.7%	0.7%	7.1%	0.5%	0.6%	0.3%	0.0%	0.2%	0.2%	0.1%	-	(Note: Ineligible to run)	-	-	44.0%	7.0
19 Apr 2018	Taiwan Brain Trust	30.7%	21.7%	-	12.2%	-	-	-	-	-	-	-	-	(Note: Ineligible to run)	-	8.7%	26.7%	9
26 Mar 2018	ESC NCCU^{1}	21.9%	24.7%	1.7%	4.8%	0.4%	0.4%	0.2%	0.1%	0.1%	0.0%	0.0%	-	(Note: Ineligible to run)	-	0.2%	45.6%	2.7
30 Jan 2018	Taiwan Real Survey	18.1%	19.1%	2.1%	6.2%	0.9%	0.7%	-	0.0%	0.1%	-	-	-	(Note: Ineligible to run)	-	-	52.8%	1.0
11 Jan 2018	Taiwan Brain Trust	30.4%	25.6%	-	8.8%	-	-	-	-	-	-	-	-	(Note: Ineligible to run)	-	8.5%	26.7%	4.8
19 Dec 2017	ESC NCCU	22.4%	25.6%	1.3%	5.9%	0.4%	0.7%	0.2%	0.1%	0.0%	0.1%	0.2%	0.1%	(Note: Ineligible to run)	-	-	43.1%	3.2
15 Sep 2017	Taiwan Brain Trust	33.6%	23.9%	-	12.3%	-	-	-	-	-	-	-	-	(Note: Ineligible to run)	-	8.6%	21.6%	9.7
21 Apr 2017	Taiwan Brain Trust	28.2%	21.5%	-	11.1%	-	-	-	-	-	-	-	-	(Note: Ineligible to run)	-	9.7%	29.5%	6.7
28 Oct 2016	Taiwan Brain Trust	26.7%	17.4%	-	15.4%	-	-	-	-	-	-	-	-	(Note: Ineligible to run)	-	14.3%	26.2%	9.3
21 Apr 2016	Taiwan Brain Trust	35.1%	17.2%	-	10.5%	-	-	-	-	-	-	-	-	(Note: Ineligible to run)	-	11.9%	25.3%	7.9
16 Jan 2016	2016 election^{a}	28.6%	17.5%	4.2%	4.0%	2.7%	1.6%		1.6%	1.0%	0.4%	0.4%	0.3%	(Note: Ineligible to run)	-	2.9%	35.1%	11.1
Notice: Faith And Hope League (FHL): ^{a}1.1%, ^{1}0.2%, ^{b}0.1%, ^{5}0.1%.; Chinese Youth Party (YCP): ^{3}0.1%.; Free Taiwan Party (FTP): ^{a}0.4%, ^{4}0.1%, ^{6}0.1%.; Formosa Alliance: ^{6}0.1%, ^{7}0.2%, ^{8}0.2%.; Taiwan Action Party Alliance (TAPA): ^{8}0.7%, ^{9}0.5%, ^{10} 0.9.; StabilityOfPower Party: ^{10}0.2%.														(Note: Ineligible to run)				

=== Coalition vote ===
Date	Source	Green	Blue	Undecided	Lead
30 Dec 2019	Formosa	41.0%	25.0%	30.7%	16.0
7 Dec 2019	BrainTrust	41.6%	23.7%	22.7%	17.9
29 Nov 2019	Formosa	37.9%	26.0%	32.3%	11.9
29 Oct 2019	Formosa	33.4%	27.2%	36.2%	6.2
21 Oct 2019	CNEWS	36.1%	31.7%	22.1%	4.4
16 Sep 2019	NCAP	34.2%	30.9%	26-6%	3.1
1 Oct 2019	Formosa	35.8%	30.7%	31.4%	5.1
25 Sep 2019	NCAP	33.7%	35.3%	22.9%	1.6
30 Aug 2019	Formosa	35.5%	31.1%	28.1%	4.4
30 Jul 2019	Formosa	35.2%	30.7%	34.1%	4.5
28 Jun 2019	Formosa	34.4%	30.0%	36.6%	4.4
28 May 2019	Formosa	32.9%	30.8%	36.4%	2.1
16 May 2019	Fount Media	37.7%	37.9%	24.3%	0.2
29 Apr 2019	Formosa	31.0%	32.1%	37.1%	1.1
2 Apr 2019	Focus	35.1%	38.3%	27.0%	3.2
1 Apr 2019	Formosa	28.6%	34.0%	37.4%	5.4
19 Mar 2019	Taiwan Real Survey	27.3%	33.1%	39.5%	5.8
5 Mar 2019	Focus	31.8%	44.0%	24.5%	12.3
25 Feb 2019	Formosa	28.7%	32.4%	39.1%	3.7
16 Feb 2019	Apple Daily	32.2%	33.0%	34.8%	0.8
29 Jan 2019	Formosa	28.1%	30.5%	41.5%	2.4
11 Jan 2019	Taiwan Real Survey	25.6%	34.3%	40.1%	8.7
7 Jan 2019	ESC NCCU	21.9%	31.8%	46.2%	9.9
24 Dec 2018	Formosa	26.0%	32.0%	40.1%	6.0
23 Dec 2018	ESC NCCU	22.6%	29.6%	47.6%	7
24 Nov 2018	2018 local elections	23.1%	27.9%	34.9%	6.8
30 Sep 2018	ESC NCCU	22.9%	28.7%	48.4%	5.8
14 Sep 2018	Taiwan Real Survey	26.0%	33.7%	40.2%	7.7
1 Sep 2018	Taiwan Real Survey	23.4%	33.9%	52.2%	10.5
13 Aug 2018	Taiwan Real Survey	25.1%	24.6%	50.4%	0.5
24 Jul 2018	Taiwan Real Survey	21.7%	26.6%	51.7%	5.9
12 Jun 2018	ESC NCCU	27.7%	28.3%	44.0%	0.6
26 Mar 2018	ESC NCCU	27.4%	26.9%	45.6%	0.5
30 Jan 2018	Taiwan Real Survey	25.0%	22.2%	52.8%	2.8
19 Dec 2017	ESC NCCU	29.3%	27.7%	43.1%	1.6
16 Jan 2016	2016 election	36.3%	26.2%	35.1%	11.1
Notice: Green: Sum of DPP, NPP, Green, SDP, TSU, FTP, TAIP, TCA, PDP, Taiwan Radical Wings, TAPA and Formosa Alliance.; Blue: Sum of KMT, PFP, NP, MKT/CPA, NPSU, CUP, YCP, Chinese National Zhi Gong Dang Party and Chinese National Progressive Party.

=== Constituency vote ===
==== Taipei 4 ====
Polling Organization	Dates 2019	Sample Size	KMT Li Yen-hsiu	DPP Kao Chia-yu
Storm Media	11-13－11-15	1,069	43.4%	39.9%

==== Hsinchu City ====
Polling Organization	Dates 2019	Sample Size	KMT Cheng Zheng-chien	DPP Cheng Hung-huei	New Power Party Kao Yu-ting	Congress Party Alliance Liao Pei-ying
Cheng Hung-huei Campaign Office	11-14－11-16	1,070	29.0%	27.1%	18.4%	0.8%
