= Taiwan Obasang Political Equality Party =

Taiwanese political party

Taiwan Obasang Political Equality Party 小民參政歐巴桑聯盟
- Secretary: 何語蓉
- Spokesperson: Icyang Tamana
- Convenor: 林詩涵
- Founded: 18 December 2017
- Headquarters: Taipei City, Taiwan
- Ideology: Progressivism (Taiwanese); Feminism (Taiwanese); Environmentalism; Taiwan independence
- Political position: Centre-left to left-wing
- National affiliation: Taiwan Go Go
- Colours: Apricot, black, green, brown, yellow
- Legislative Yuan: 0 / 113
- Municipal mayors: 0 / 6
- Magistrates/mayors: 0 / 16
- Councilors: 6 / 910

Website
- obs.ppedu.org

Taiwan Obasang Political Equality Party (小民參政歐巴桑聯盟; abbr. 小歐盟) is a political party in Taiwan.

== History ==
The Taiwan Obasang Political Equality Party can trace its history to parent-child co-learning groups originally established by the Association of Participatory Parental Education in 2012. As a political party, TOPEP was founded in 2017. 90 percent of its members are women.

== Party policies ==
The party's core values are political equality, children's rights, a parent-child friendly society, environmental justice, gender equality, animal protection, defending Taiwan's sovereignty and labor rights.

In terms of cross-strait relations and foreign affairs and national defense, the party believes that Taiwan has become a sovereign and independent country, and that it is necessary to strengthen national identity, promote Taiwan's local culture, and transmit Taiwan's values to the international community. In addition, it should establish a civil defense mechanism and implement national defense reform, national defense autonomy, strengthen Taiwan's self-defense force, prepare for war rather than avoiding it, prevent China's attempts to change the status quo, oppose China's threat of force, and enhance Taiwan-U.S. relations. In addition, in 2022, the entire party will sign a "pledge to defend Taiwan without surrender".

In September 2025, the party announced an alliance Taiwan Go Go with the New Power Party, Statebuilding Party and Green Party Taiwan for the 2026 local elections. The parties agreed to coordinate the nominations for local council seats. They also agreed on shared principles including defending Taiwan from Chinese aggression, narrowing the wealth gap, and protecting the environment.

== Election results ==
The party first contested elections in the 2018 local elections with 21 candidates. They received over 80,000 votes and 70 percent of candidates had their deposits returned. None of the fifteen Obasang candidates who ran in the 2022 local elections won office.

In the 2024 legislative election, the party received 128,613 votes for the party list, equal to 0.93 percent, making it the fifth most popular party.
