= 2020 Taiwanese general election =

← 2016	11 January 2020	2024 →
- Opinion polls
- Presidential election
- Turnout: 74.90% (▲8.63pp)
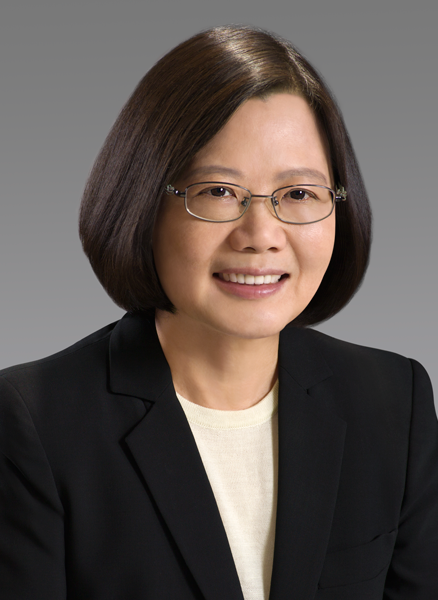

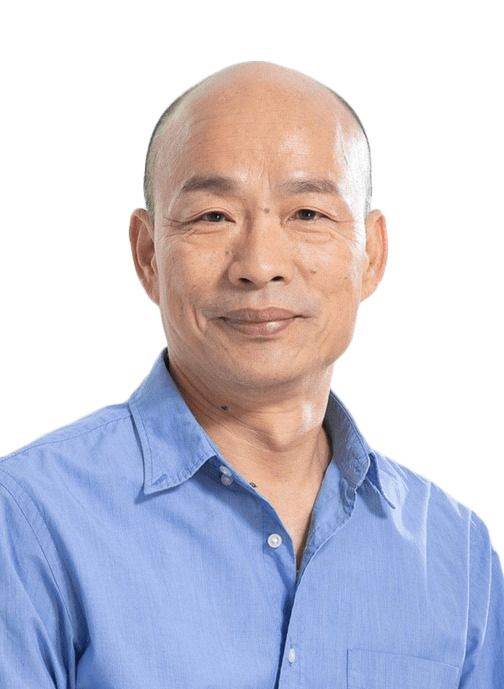
Nominee	Tsai Ing-wen	Han Kuo-yu
Party	DPP	KMT
Running mate	Lai Ching-te	Chang San-cheng
Popular vote	8,170,231	5,522,119
Percentage	57.13%	38.61%
President before election
Tsai Ing-wen
DPP
Elected President
Tsai Ing-wen
DPP
- Legislative election
- All 113 seats in the Legislative Yuan; 57 seats needed for a majority
- Turnout: 74.86% (▲8.61 pp, party-list); 74.93% (▲8.59 pp, constituency)
Party	Leader	Vote %	Seats	+/–
DPP	Cho Jung-tai	33.98	61	−7
Kuomintang	Wu Den-yih	33.36	38	+3
TPP	Ko Wen-je	11.22	5	New
NPP	Hsu Yung-ming	7.75	3	−2
Statebuilding	Chen Yi-chi	3.16	1	New
Independent	–	–	5	+4
This lists parties that won seats. See the complete results below.
President of the Legislative Yuan before	President of the Legislative Yuan after
Su Jia-chyuan; DPP	You Si-kun; DPP

The 2020 Taiwanese general election was held on 11 January 2020 to elect the 15th President and Vice President of Taiwan, and all 113 members of the 10th Legislative Yuan.

== Presidential election ==
In the presidential election, voters elected the President and Vice President as a joint ticket. The process of presidential primary elections and nominations was held during the last six months of 2019.

Incumbent President Tsai Ing-wen of the Democratic Progressive Party (DPP), who was previously elected in 2016, was eligible to seek for a second term. With 90% of the votes counted, Tsai Ing-wen was declared the victor, with 7.8 million votes. She was inaugurated on 20 May 2020.

== Legislative election ==
The legislative election was held on 11 January 2020 for all 113 seats to the Legislative Yuan. The term of the Legislative Yuan will begin on 1 February 2020.

In the last election in 2016, the Democratic Progressive Party (DPP) won a comfortable majority over the Kuomintang (KMT) for the first time with 68 seats, while the KMT's representation sharply dropped to only 35 seats.

In this 2020 Taiwanese legislative election, the DPP retained their majority in the legislature winning 61 seats, along with DPP's presidential candidate Tsai Ing-wen reelected with a record breaking historical high vote count.

The newly established Taiwan People's Party received more than 5% of the popular vote in the party-list proportional representation category, winning 5 seats in the legislature and more critically the ability to directly nominate its own presidential candidate in the 2024 Taiwan presidential election, as opposed to needing petition from nearly 300,000 eligible voters (1.5% of total registered voters from the most recently held legislative election), which can be a costly and labor-intensive process.

The People First Party did not win any seats in this election. Because the party did not pass the 5% hurdle in the proportional representation category, the party will not be able to directly nominate a presidential candidate in the next Taiwanese presidential election, which the People First Party was able to do in this and the previous presidential election in Taiwan.

== Electoral interference ==
In December 2019 The Diplomat reported that the People’s Republic of China was actively engaged in political warfare efforts to influence and disrupt the 2020 general election.

Self-proclaimed former Chinese spy William Wang, who defected to Australia, claimed that the Chinese Communist Party wanted to stop Taiwan President Tsai Ing-wen from being re-elected. After an investigation by authorities in Taiwan, Wang's claim were found to not be credible.

== See also ==
- Opinion polling for the 2020 Taiwanese general election
- 2024 Taiwanese general election
