= Progressivism in Taiwan =

Reform movement in Taiwan

Progressivism is a major political movement in Taiwanese politics. There are several progressive political parties in Taiwan, but most are associated with the Pan-Green Coalition led by the Democratic Progressive Party (DPP).

== Progressive parties in Taiwan ==
The Democratic Progressive Party (DPP) is a centre-left social liberal and progressive party in Taiwan. It grew out of the Tangwai movement formed in the 1970s to oppose the ruling Kuomintang. As of the 2020 legislative elections, the DPP holds a majority of 61 legislative seats.

The Taiwan Solidarity Union (TSU) was historically a left-wing progressive party characterised primarily by its Taiwanese nationalism and derives its membership from both the Kuomintang's former moderate and Taiwan-oriented fringe and DPP supporters disgruntled by the party's moderation on the question of Taiwanese sovereignty. Its progressive character was questionable, although it is part of the DPP's pro-Taiwan independence Pan-Green alliance. The TSU lost all of its seats in the 2016 elections.

The New Power Party (NPP) is a progressive party which aims to rewrite the Constitution of Republic of China and to carry out Taiwanization. The NPP won three seats in the 2020 legislative election, but lost all the seats in 2024.

The modern liberal parties in Taiwan are mostly associated with Taiwanese nationalism, as well as liberal positions on social issues, such as support for LGBT rights and abolishing the death penalty. However, progressivism and social liberalism in Taiwan have not easily extended to extensive labor rights, or more liberal support for immigrant rights.

== List of progressive parties ==
=== Represented in the Legislative Yuan ===
- Democratic Progressive Party (founded in 1986)

=== Not represented in the Legislative Yuan ===
- Peasant Party (founded in 1989)
- Green Party Taiwan (founded in 1996)
- Taiwan Solidarity Union (founded in 2001)
- People's Democratic Party (founded in 2011)
- Trees Party (founded in 2014)
- Social Democratic Party (founded in 2015)
- Free Taiwan Party (founded in 2015)
- Taiwan Go Go (alliance established in 2025)

=== Formerly represented in the Legislative Yuan ===
- Taiwan Independence Party (1996–2020)
- Taiwan Statebuilding Party (founded in 2016)
- New Power Party (founded in 2015)

== See also ==
- Conservatism in Taiwan
- History of the Republic of China
- Pan-Green Coalition
- Taiwan independence Left
