= Pan-Green Coalition =

Taiwanese nationalist political group

Pan-Green Coalition 泛綠聯盟
- Leader: Lai Ching-te
- Ideology: Majority: Taiwanese nationalism Progressivism (Taiwanese); Anti-communism; Anti-imperialism; Factions: ROC independence Taiwan independence Social democracy Social liberalism Green politics Radicalism; Conservatism (Taiwanese)
- Political position: Centre-left (majority)
- Opponents: Pan-Blue Coalition; Pro-Beijing camp Taiwan Go Go (factions)
- Colours: Green
- Legislative Yuan: 51 / 113 (45%)

Pan-Green coalition
- Traditional Chinese: 泛綠聯盟
- Simplified Chinese: 泛绿联盟
Transcriptions
Standard Mandarin
- Hanyu Pinyin: Fànlǜ Liánméng
- Bopomofo: ㄈㄢˋㄌㄩˋ ㄌㄧㄢˊㄇㄥˊ
- Gwoyeu Romatzyh: Fannliuh Lianmeng
- Wade–Giles: Fan^{4}-lü^{4} Lien^{2}-meng^{2}
- Tongyong Pinyin: Fàn-lyù Lián-méng
- IPA: [fân.lŷ ljɛ̌n.mə̌ŋ]
Southern Min
- Hokkien POJ: Huān-le̍k-liân-bêng

Pan-Green force
- Traditional Chinese: 泛綠軍
- Simplified Chinese: 泛绿军
Transcriptions
Standard Mandarin
- Hanyu Pinyin: Fànlǜ Jūn
- Bopomofo: ㄈㄢˋㄌㄩˋ ㄐㄩㄣ
- Gwoyeu Romatzyh: Fannliuh Jiun
- Wade–Giles: Fan^{4}-lü^{4} Chün^{1}
- Tongyong Pinyin: Fàn-lyù Jyun
- IPA: [fân.lŷ tɕýn]
Southern Min
- Hokkien POJ: Huān-le̍k-kun

Pan-Green groups
- Traditional Chinese: 綠營
- Simplified Chinese: 绿营
Transcriptions
Standard Mandarin
- Hanyu Pinyin: Lǜ Yíng
- Bopomofo: ㄌㄩˋ ㄧㄥˊ
- Gwoyeu Romatzyh: Liuh Yng
- Wade–Giles: Lü^{4} Ying^{2}
- Tongyong Pinyin: Lyù Yíng
- IPA: [lŷ ǐŋ]
Southern Min
- Hokkien POJ: Le̍k-iânn

The Pan-Green Coalition, Pan-Green force, or Pan-Green group is a Taiwanese nationalist political coalition in Taiwan (Republic of China). The Democratic Progressive Party (DPP) is widely considered the leading member, while other parties often considered part of the coalition include the Taiwan Statebuilding Party (TSP), Social Democratic Party (SDP), Green Party Taiwan and the New Power Party (NPP). However, the status of these minor parties as coalition members was occasionally debated. In 2026, TSP, the Green Party, NPP and the Taiwan Obasang Political Equality Party formed Taiwan Go Go, another Taiwanese nationalist political coalition and competed directly against the DPP in several districts.

== Political stance ==
The Pan-Green Coalition has been referred to as "centre-left" or "left-wing". It is composed of parties oriented toward Taiwanese nationalism, some of which support Taiwan independence, opposing the Republic of China–centered Chinese nationalist pan-Blue Coalition. The American left-wing Democratic Socialists of America official publication described it as being composed of "mostly social democratic parties".

== History ==
The name comes from the colours of the Democratic Progressive Party, which originally adopted green in part because of its association with the anti-nuclear movement. In contrast to the Pan-Blue Coalition, the Pan-Green Coalition favors Taiwanization and Taiwan independence over Chinese unification, although members in both coalitions have moderated their policies to reach voters in the center.

This strategy is helped by the fact that much of the motivation that voters have for voting for one party or the other are for reasons that have nothing to do with relations with China. This is particularly true among swing voters. For much of the 1990s, the parties which later formed the Pan-Green Coalition greatly benefited because they were less corrupt than the ruling Kuomintang (KMT). However, due to the controversies and the alleged corruption cases involving the former DPP nominated President Chen Shui-bian, the public perception of the Coalition is seemed to have been altered somewhat.

The Pan-Green Coalition formed in the aftermath of the 2000 presidential election, after which Lee Teng-hui was expelled from the Kuomintang and created his own party, the Taiwan Solidarity Union, which maintains a pro-independence platform.

Unlike the internal dynamics of the Pan-Blue Coalition, which consist of relatively equal-sized parties with very similar ideologies, the Pan-Green Coalition contains the DPP, which is much larger and more moderate than the TSU. So rather than coordinating electoral strategies, the presence of the TSU keeps the DPP from moving too far away from its Taiwan independence roots. In local elections, competition tends to be fierce between Pan-Green candidates from different parties, and as a rule, joint candidates are not proposed.

== Member parties ==
=== Current members ===
Party	Ideology	Leader
Democratic Progressive Party (DPP) 民主進步黨	Progressivism (Taiwanese); Social liberalism; Taiwanese nationalism; Anti-communism; Anti-imperialism	Lai Ching-te
Taiwan Statebuilding Party (TSP) 台灣基進	Taiwanese independence; Progressivism (Taiwanese); Radicalism; Anti-communism; Anti-imperialism	Chen Yi-chi
Social Democratic Party (SDP) 社會民主黨	Social democracy Progressivism (Taiwanese); Anti-imperialism	Ting Yung-yan
Green Party Taiwan 台灣綠黨	Green politics Anti-imperialism	Lee Keng-cheng and Chang Yu-jing
Taiwan Solidarity Union (TSU) 臺灣團結聯盟	Conservatism (Taiwanese); Right-wing populism Taiwan independence Anti-communism; Anti-Chinese nationalism	Liu Yi-te

=== Former members (Dissolved) ===
Party	Ideology
Taiwan Independence Party (TIP) 建國黨	Progressivism
Taiwan Constitution Association (TCA) 制憲聯盟	Constitutionalism

== Legislative strength ==
=== Legislative Yuan ===
Election	Number of popular votes	% of popular votes	Districts	At-large	Aborigine	Overseas	Total Seats	Member parties (extra-parliamentary parties bracketed)
1992	2,944,195 (Districts + Aborigine)	31.03	38	11	0	2	51 / 130	DPP
1995	3,132,156 (Districts + Aborigine)	33.20	41	11	0	2	54 / 164	DPP
1998	3,111,952 (Districts + Aborigine)	31.01	53	15	0	3	71 / 225	DPP + TIP
2001	4,250,682 (Districts + Aborigine)	41.15	77	19	0	4	100 / 225	DPP + TSU + (TIP)
2004	4,230,076 (Districts + Aborigine)	43.53	76	20	1	4	101 / 225	DPP + TSU + (TIP)
2008	4,043,781 (Party-list)	41.35	13	14	0	-	27 / 113	DPP + (TSU + TCA + Green)
2012	5,964,988 (Party-list)	45.32	27	16	0	-	43 / 113	DPP + TSU + (Green)
2016	6,075,660 (Party-list)	49.48	49	18	1	-	68 / 113	DPP + (TSU + TIP + TCA + Green + SDP + FTP)
2020	5,650,427 (Party-list)	39.90	47	13	2	-	62 / 113	DPP + TSP + (Green + TSU + TIP)
2024	5,237,810 (Party-list)	38.01	36	13	2	-	51 / 113	DPP + (TSP + Green + TSU)

== Media ==
- Liberty Times
- Sanlih E-Television
- Formosa Television
- Newtalk News

== See also ==
- Anti–People's Republic of China sentiment in Taiwan
- Bluebird Movement
- Pro-Taiwanese sentiment
- Taiwan Go Go, a more left-leaning pro-independence political coalition that does not belong to the Pan-Green Coalition
- Pro-Taiwan camp (disambiguation)
