= Ko Chih-en =

Taiwanese psychologist and politician (born 1962)

- 柯志恩
- Official portrait, 2016

Member of the Legislative Yuan
- Incumbent
- Assumed office 1 February 2024
- Constituency: Party-list (KMT)
- In office 1 February 2016 – 31 January 2020
- Constituency: Party-list (KMT)

Personal details
- Born: 29 April 1962 (age 64) Pingtung County, Taiwan
- Party: Kuomintang
- Parent: Ko Wen-fu (father)
- Education: National Chengchi University (BEd); Michigan State University (MEd); University of Southern California (PhD)
- Scientific career
- Fields: Educational psychology
- Thesis: Instructional media selection: Interactive effects of timing of feedback and learners' prior knowledge on the achievement and retention of a computer-based mathematical task (1992)
- Doctoral advisor: Richard E. Clark

Ko Chih-en (Chinese: 柯志恩; pinyin: Kē Zhì'ēn; born 29 April 1962) is a Taiwanese educational psychologist and politician who has served as a member of the Legislative Yuan since 2024. A member of the Kuomintang (KMT), she previously served as a legislator from 2016 to 2020.

Born in Pingtung County, Ko graduated from National Chengchi University in 1984 and became a popular television presenter. After earning her doctorate in psychology from the University of Southern California in 1992, she taught as a professor of psychology and academic administrator at Tamkang University.

Ko entered politics as a KMT party-list legislator in 2016 but lost her bid for re-election in the 2020 Taiwanese legislative election. She subsequently served as a KMT deputy secretary-general and executive director of the party's National Policy Foundation. In 2022, she unsuccessfully challenged incumbent mayor Chen Chi-mai in the 2022 Kaohsiung mayoral election. She was returned to the Legislative Yuan in 2024 and was nominated as the KMT's candidate in the 2026 Kaohsiung mayoral election.

== Early life and education ==
Ko was born on 29 April 1962 and was raised in Chaozhou, Pingtung County, Taiwan. She has two older brothers. Her father, Ko Wen-fu (柯文福), was an educator who served as magistrate of Pingtung County, from 1973 to 1981. As a child, she spoke predominantly Taiwanese Hokkien and had limited proficiency in Mandarin Chinese before the age of seven. Her family later moved to Pingtung City, where she attended elementary school and learned to speak Mandarin by interacting with military families living in nearby military dependents' villages.

Ko graduated from National Pingtung Girls' Senior High School. She then enrolled at National Chengchi University to study education. She graduated with a bachelor's degree in educational psychology in 1984. She then pursued graduate studies in the United States, earning a Master of Education (M.Ed.) from Michigan State University. She briefly returned to Taiwan to work as a university lecturer and television presenter afterwards.

Despite initial success as a television host, Ko returned to the U.S. to complete doctoral studies with the aim of becoming a professor. She earned her Ph.D. in educational psychology from the University of Southern California in 1992. Her doctoral dissertation was titled, Instructional Media Selection: Interactive Effects of Timing of Feedback and Learners' Prior Knowledge on the Achievement and Retention of a Computer-Based Mathematical Task.

== Academic career ==
After receiving her doctorate, Ko was an adjunct associate professor of education at National Chengchi University and an adjunct professor at Fu Jen Catholic University before becoming a full-time associate professor of teacher education at Tamkang University. She also worked at the University of Southern California as an instructor at its Human Resources Training Center and as a counselor at its Learning Center.

In 1 August 2002, Ko became the inaugural director of Tamkang University's Graduate Institute of Educational Psychology and Counseling, where she remained until July 2008. She initially held the rank of associate professor and was subsequently promoted to professor in the institute.

Ko was appointed dean of student affairs at Tamkang in August 2009, becoming the first woman to hold the position in the university's history. She was still serving concurrently as dean of student affairs and professor of educational psychology and counseling when the Kuomintang nominated her for the Legislative Yuan in November 2015. She was succeeded as dean by Lin Chun-hung at the beginning of the second semester of the 2015–2016 academic year.

During the 2023–2024 academic year, Ko remained a professor at Tamkang University, where she continued to teach and do research in educational psychology, developmental psychology, cognition and learning, learning diagnosis, and creative-thinking instruction. She retired from the university in 2024.

== Legislative Yuan ==
=== First term, 2016–2020 ===
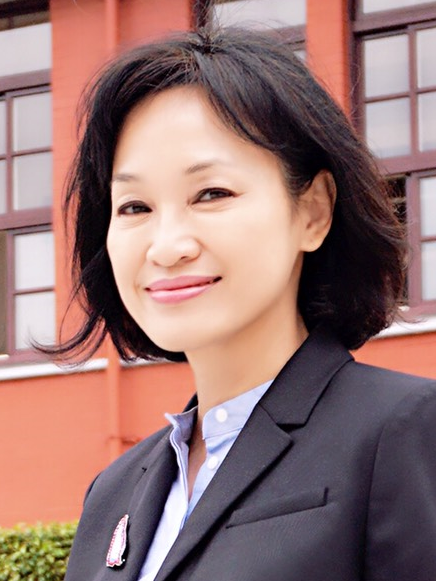
Ko in 2017

The Kuomintang (KMT) selected Ko as the second candidate on its party list for the 2016 Taiwanese legislative election, behind Wang Jin-pyng, who was then president of the Legislative Yuan. The party included Ko, who was then dean of student affairs at Tamkang University, among its nominees representing the education sector. Following the election, she assumed office as a member of the 9th Legislative Yuan on 1 February 2016.

During her first term, Ko served on the Legislative Yuan's Education and Culture Committee throughout all eight legislative sessions. In the third session, she served as convener of both the Education and Culture Committee and the Discipline Committee. She also served on the Procedure Committee during several subsequent legislative sessions, including as its convener during the seventh session.

Ko at the inaugural meeting of the Legislative Yuan's Canada Friendship Association in April 2016

As a legislator, Ko took an interest in education, LGBT rights, women's rights, pension reform, and energy. She was supportive of many cultural exchanges between Taiwan and other countries, namely China. Soon after taking office, she co-signed a bill proposed by Karen Yu to allow young children into the legislative chamber. In March 2018, Ko remarked that customs deemed discriminatory toward women should be phased out. She approached pension reform from a schoolteacher's perspective, proposing that the monthly pension be capped at NT$32,160, and suggested that pensions be withheld from retired public servants that took positions at government funded agencies willing to pay half of their former salary.

In the 2020 Taiwanese legislative election, Ko contested the directly elected seat for New Taipei City's seventh electoral district, covering eastern Banqiao District, against incumbent DPP legislator Lo Chih-cheng. Ko received 70,659 votes, or approximately 40.08 percent, losing to Lo, who secured reelection with 82,764 votes. Her first legislative term ended on 31 January 2020. Following the KMT's defeat in the 2020 presidential and legislative elections, Ko joined the party's leadership under chairman Johnny Chiang. On 17 March 2020, Chiang announced Ko's appointment as one of the party's four part-time deputy secretaries-general. In October 2021, after Eric Chu became KMT chairman, Ko was appointed executive director of the National Policy Foundation, the party's policy research organization.

=== Second term, 2024–present ===
Ko in January 2023 speaking at a KMT campaign rally ahead of the 2024 Taiwanese general election

On 19 November 2023, the KMT selected Ko as the second candidate on its party list for the 2024 Taiwanese legislative election, behind former Kaohsiung mayor Han Kuo-yu. Following the election, Ko returned to the Legislative Yuan on 1 February 2024 as a party-list legislator in the eleventh legislative term. She resumed service on the Education and Culture Committee and was appointed one of its conveners during the first legislative session.

In February 2024, Ko joined fellow KMT party-list legislators Chen Ching-hui and Lin Chien-chi in establishing a joint constituency service office at the party's Kaohsiung headquarters. On 20 April 2024, she became chairwoman of the KMT's Kaohsiung City party branch, succeeding Huang Chao-shun. In November 2025, following a change in the KMT's national leadership, Ko was retained as chairwoman of its Kaohsiung City branch under party chairwoman Cheng Li-wun.

== Mayoral election campaigns ==
=== 2022 Kaohsiung mayoral election ===
In June 2022, Ko was a prospective KMT candidate for the Kaohsiung mayoral election, after internal party polling placed her among the leading contenders for the nomination. On 29 June 2022, the KMT nominated her to challenge incumbent DPP mayor Chen Chi-mai. During the campaign, Ko emphasized employment opportunities, economic development, education, environmental protection, and conditions affecting young people in Kaohsiung. She also ran on environmental protection policies. In the election held on 26 November 2022, Ko received 529,607 votes, losing to Chen, who was re-elected with 766,147 votes.

=== 2026 Kaohsiung mayoral election ===
On 24 December 2025, the KMT's Central Standing Committee selected Ko to contest the 2026 Kaohsiung mayoral election, as part of the party's first round of local executive nominations. Her nomination was confirmed at the party's national congress on 25 July 2026. The election's main contenders included Ko and DPP legislator Lai Jui-lung, who was nominated to succeed the term-limited mayor Chen Chi-mai. Her campaign platform included proposals for urban redevelopment, industrial modernization, environmental protection, public transportation, youth employment, and affordable housing.

== Personal life ==
Ko is married to Hung De-cheng (洪德成), a computer engineer. They have two children, a son and a daughter.
