= Wu Hsin-tai =

Taiwanese politician

- 吳欣岱
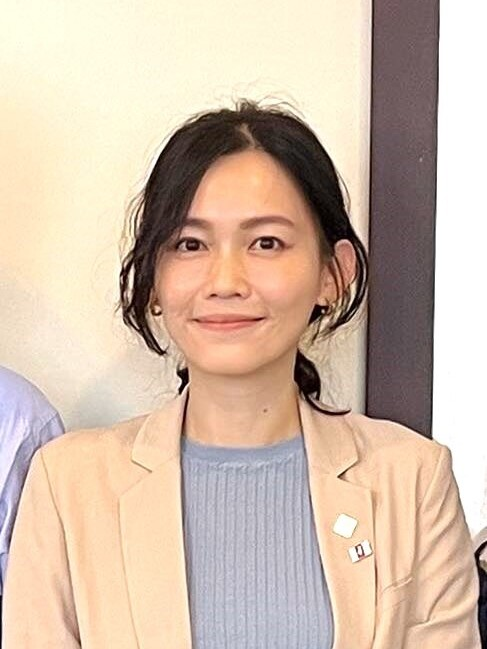
- Wu in 2023

Personal details
- Born: 1 July 1987 (age 38) Taoyuan City, Taiwan
- Party: Taiwan Statebuilding Party

Wu Hsin-tai (Chinese: 吳欣岱; pinyin: Wú Xīndài; born 1 July 1987) is a Taiwanese politician. She is a member of the Taiwan Statebuilding Party.

== Political career ==
In November 2019, Wu accepted a nomination from the Taiwan Statebuilding Party to contest the 2020 election as an at-large legislative candidate. She was ranked third on the TSP party list. The Taiwan Statebuilding Party won over three percent of the party list vote, allowing zero at-large legislative candidates to take office.
