= Green Party Taiwan =

Political party in Taiwan

Green Party Taiwan 台灣綠黨
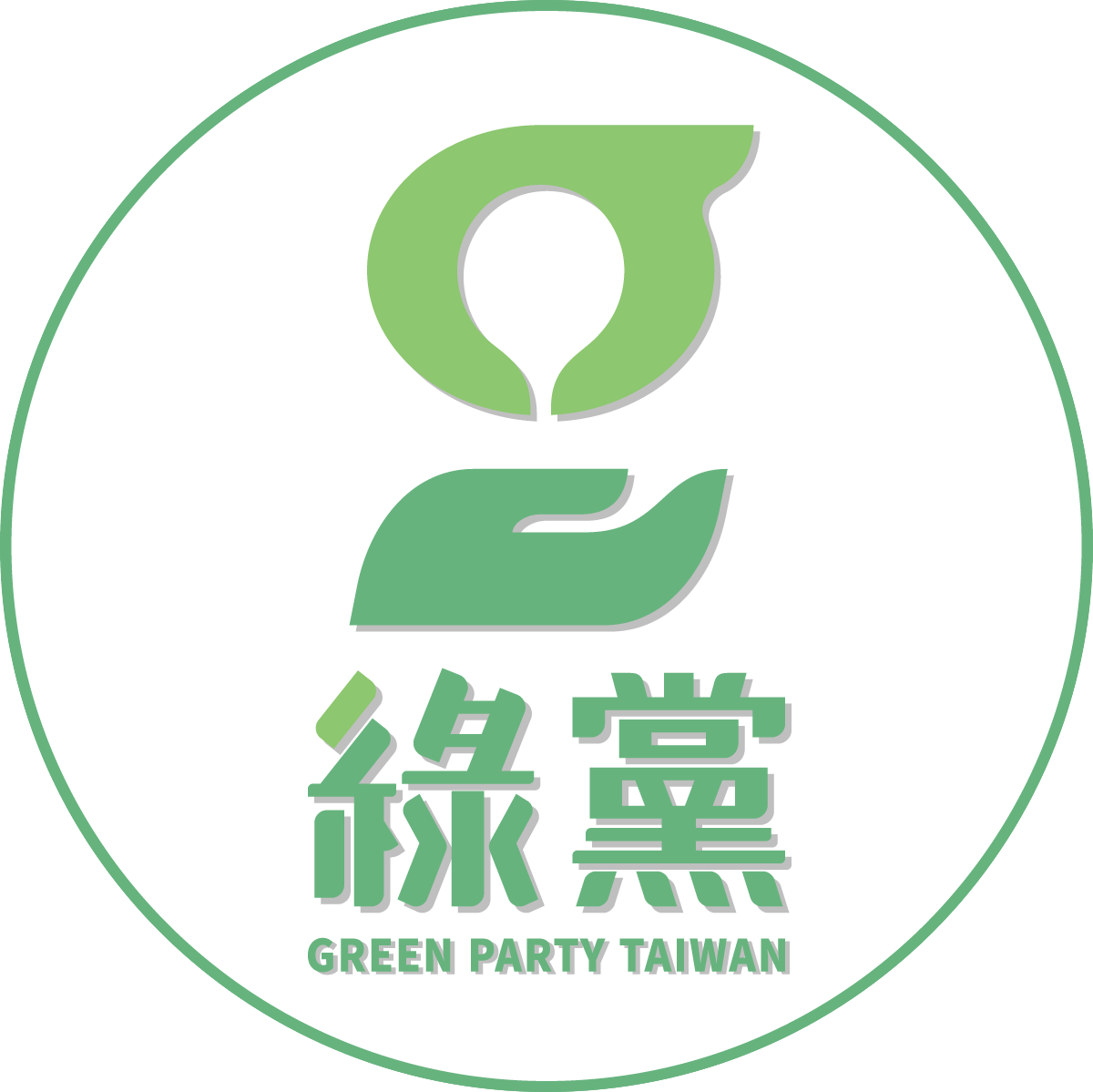
- Chairperson: Gan Chong-Wei; Wang Yan-Han (王彥涵)
- Founded: 25 January 1996
- Headquarters: 4F-7, No. 35, Shaoxing North Street, Zhongzheng, Taipei
- Membership: 400
- Ideology: Green politics Anti-imperialism
- Political position: Centre-left to left-wing
- National affiliation: Taiwan Go Go; Pan-Green Coalition
- Regional affiliation: Asia Pacific Greens Federation
- International affiliation: Global Greens
- Colours: Green
- Legislative Yuan: 0 / 113
- Municipal mayors: 0 / 6
- Magistrates/mayors: 0 / 16
- Councilors: 0 / 910
- Township/city mayors: 0 / 204

Website
- web.greenparty.org.tw

Green Party Taiwan
- Traditional Chinese: 臺灣綠黨
- Simplified Chinese: 台湾绿党
Transcriptions
Standard Mandarin
- Hanyu Pinyin: Táiwān Lǜdǎng
- Bopomofo: ㄊㄞˊ ㄨㄢ ㄌㄩˋ ㄉㄤˇ
- Wade–Giles: Tai^{2}-wan^{1} Lü^{4}-tang^{3}
- IPA: [tʰǎɪwán lŷtàŋ]
Hakka
- Romanization: Thòi-vân Liu̍k-tóng
Southern Min
- Hokkien POJ: Tâi-ôan Le̍k-tóng
- Tâi-lô: Tâi-uân Li̍k-tóng

Green Party Taiwan (Note: In local languages: Traditional Chinese script: 台灣綠黨; Mandarin Pinyin: Táiwān Lǜ Dǎng; Hokkien: Tâi-oân Le̍k Tóng; Sixian Hakka: Thòi-vân Liu̍k Tóng) is a political party in Taiwan established on 25 January 1996. Although the party is sympathetic to Taiwanese nationalism and shares a number of centre-left positions with the Pan-Green Coalition, the party emphasizes campaigning primarily on social and environmental issues. Green Party Taiwan is a member of the Asia Pacific Greens Federation and participates in the Global Greens.

Much of the 400-strong membership are affiliated with the non-governmental organisation sector of Taiwanese society, as well as from academia and the youth community.

== Electoral history ==
In 1996, Green Party Taiwa's Kao Meng-ting was elected to the National Assembly. However, he left the party in 1997.

In the 2008 legislative election, the Green Party of Taiwan formed a red-green coalition with a labour-led organization Raging Citizens Act Now! (人民火大行動聯盟), but failed to win any seats.

In the 2012 legislative election, Green Party Taiwan garnered 1.7% of the party vote. While still far short of the 5% threshold to win a seat in the legislature, this makes it the largest extraparliamentary party in Taiwan. Its best showing is in Orchid Island, where Taiwan's nuclear waste storage facility is located. There, the party collected 35.76% of the party votes due to its strong anti-nuclear stance.

In the 2014 local elections, the party won two seats. Wang Hao-yu was elected to the Taoyuan City Council, and Jay Chou was elected to the Hsinchu County Council.

In the 2016 general election, the party ran in a coalition with the newly founded centre-left Social Democratic Party and fielded candidates in both constituency races and the nationwide party ballot. The coalition garnered 2.5% of the party vote without winning any seats.

In the 2020 legislative election, the Green Party nominated five young professionals, including famed psychologist Cheng Hui-wen and party founder Kao Cheng-yan. They got 2.4% of the votes and did not win any seats. They were the second largest party that didn't win a seat.

In the 2022 local election, the party won only one seat. Liu Chong-hsian was elected to the Hsinchu City Council.

The Green Party nominated Taiwan's first transgender legislative candidate, Abbygail ET Wu (吳伊婷), in the 2024 election cycle. The party won 117,298 votes (0.85%), not enough to seat any candidate named on the Green Party list.

On 30 March 2024, Liu Chong-hsian resigned from the party. This leaves the party with no members holding public office.

In September 2025, the Green Party announced an alliance with the New Power Party, Statebuilding Party and Taiwan Obasang Political Equality Party for the 2026 local elections. The parties outlined their shared principles and agreed to coordinate the nominations for local council seats.

Election	Mayors & Magistrates	Councils	Third-level Municipal heads	Third-level Municipal councils	Fourth-level Village heads	Election Leader
2018 unified	0 / 22	3 / 912	0 / 204	1 / 2,148	0 / 7,744	Wang Hao-yu
2022 unified	0 / 22	1 / 910	0 / 204	0 / 2,139	0 / 7,748	Yu Hsiao-ching

== List of chairpersons ==
- Kao Cheng-yan (高成炎), 1996–1997 and 2003–2004 Chair. Professor of Computer Science at National Taiwan University; Green Party Taiwan's founding chair; former director of Taiwan Environmental Protection Union; candidate for the Legislative Yuan in 1998 and 2001.
- Shin-Min Shih (施信民), 1998 Chair. Professor of Chemical Engineering at National Taiwan University; President of the Institute of Environment and Resource; former Director of Taiwan Environmental Protection Union;
- Kuang-Yu Chen (陳光宇), 1999–2000 Chair. candidate for the Taipei City Council in 1998.
- Ayo Cheng (鄭先祐), 2001–2002 Chair. Dean of College of Environment and Ecology at National University of Tainan; former director of Taiwan Environmental Protection Union.
- Yen-Wen Peng (彭渰雯), 2005 Chair. Assistant professor of Public Administration and Management at Shih Hsin University; candidate for the Taipei City Council in 1998.
- Sam Lin (林聖崇), 2006 Co-chair. Former Chair of Taiwan Ecology Conservation Union.
- Jolan Hsieh (謝若蘭), 2006 Co-chair. Assistant professor of Indigenous Culture at National Dong Hwa University.
- Mary Chen (陳曼麗), 2007 Co-chair. Former president of the Homemakers' Union and Foundation; former president of the National Union of Taiwan Women Association; candidate for the Legislative Yuan in 2008. Elected to the legislature in 2016 after joining the Democratic Progressive Party.
- Hung Hui-hsiang (洪輝祥), 2007 Co-chair. President of Pingtung Environmental Protection Union; candidate for the Legislative Yuan in 2004.
- Chung Pao-chu (鍾寶珠), 2008–2009 Co-chair. President of Hualien Environmental Protection Union; candidate for the Hualien County Councilor in 1998, 2002.
- Leo Chang (張宏林), 2008–2009 Co-chair. Secretary-General of the Taiwan NPO Self-Regulation Alliance; former Secretary-General of the Society of Wildness; candidate for the Taipei City Council in 2006.
- Gelinda Chang, co-chair for 2011; educator.
- Robin Winkler, co-chair for 2011 and 2012; lawyer and founder of Wild at Heart Legal Defense Association; naturalised Taiwanese citizen.
- Karen Yu (余宛如), co-chair from 2012 to 2015; social entrepreneur and co-founder of OKOGreen café, a fair trade coffee shop. Elected to the Legislative Yuan in 2016 as a member of the Democratic Progressive Party.
- Ken-cheng Lee (李根政), co-chair from 2013 to 2017; artist, educator and founder of Citizen of the Earth Taiwan, an environmental organisation.
- Chang Yu-ching (張育憬), co-chair from 2015 to 2017; environmental activist.

== Notable persons ==
- Linda Gail Arrigo, international affairs officer for the party; ex-wife of Shih Ming-teh.
- Thomas Chan (詹順貴), at-large candidate for the legislature in the 2016 election. Although not elected, he was later appointed as Deputy Minister for the Environmental Protection Administration in the first cabinet of the Tsai Ing-wen administration led by Premier Lin Chuan.
- Peter Huang (黃文雄), notable for his unsuccessful attempt to assassinate Chiang Ching-kuo in 1970; former National Policy Advisor on human rights issues to the President of the Republic of China; avid supporter of the party since it was founded.
- Pan Han-chiang (潘翰疆), member of the Central Supervisory Committee of the party, 1999; former deputy secretary-general of the Taiwan Environmental Protection Union. He split from Green Party Taiwan in 2014 to form the Trees Party.
- Kao Meng-ting (高孟定), who won a seat in Yunlin County for Green Party Taiwan in the National Assembly in 1996, but later defected to the Democratic Progressive Party.
- Lin Cheng-hsiu (林正修), former Research, Development and Evaluation Commission Director, Taipei City (apparently the only party member holding a public office in 2004); he ran unsuccessfully as an independent candidate in the 2004 legislative election. In 2007, Lin was a campaign manager for the Pan-Blue Coalition's presidential candidate Ma Ying-jeou.
- Sinan Mavivo (希婻‧瑪飛洑; 賴美惠), the top candidate of the Green Party Taiwan list in the legislative election 2012, is an anti-nuclear campaigner. She is of the Tao people from Pongso no Tao (Orchid Island).
- Calvin Wen (溫炳原), a former secretary-general of the party, competed in the by-election in Daan District due to the resignation of Diane Lee in 2009.
- Rita Jhang (張竹芩), also known as Zukkim Zong and JhuCin Jhang, served as Secretary-General of Green Party Taiwan from 1 April 2020 to 31 May 2021. She is the current president of the North American Taiwan Studies Association and co-host of the feminist podcast Z Green Party (Z色派對).
- Zoe Lee (李菁琪), current Secretary-General of Green Party Taiwan, cannabis advocate and podcaster, and Taiwan's first "weed lawyer" whose law firm only takes on clients accused of cannabis-related crimes.

== See also ==
- Politics of the Republic of China
- List of environmental organizations
- List of political parties in Taiwan
- Elections in Taiwan
- Taiwan independence Left
- Trees Party
- Global Greens
- Green party
