= Wang Hsing-huan =

Chairman of Taiwan Statebuilding Party

- 王興煥
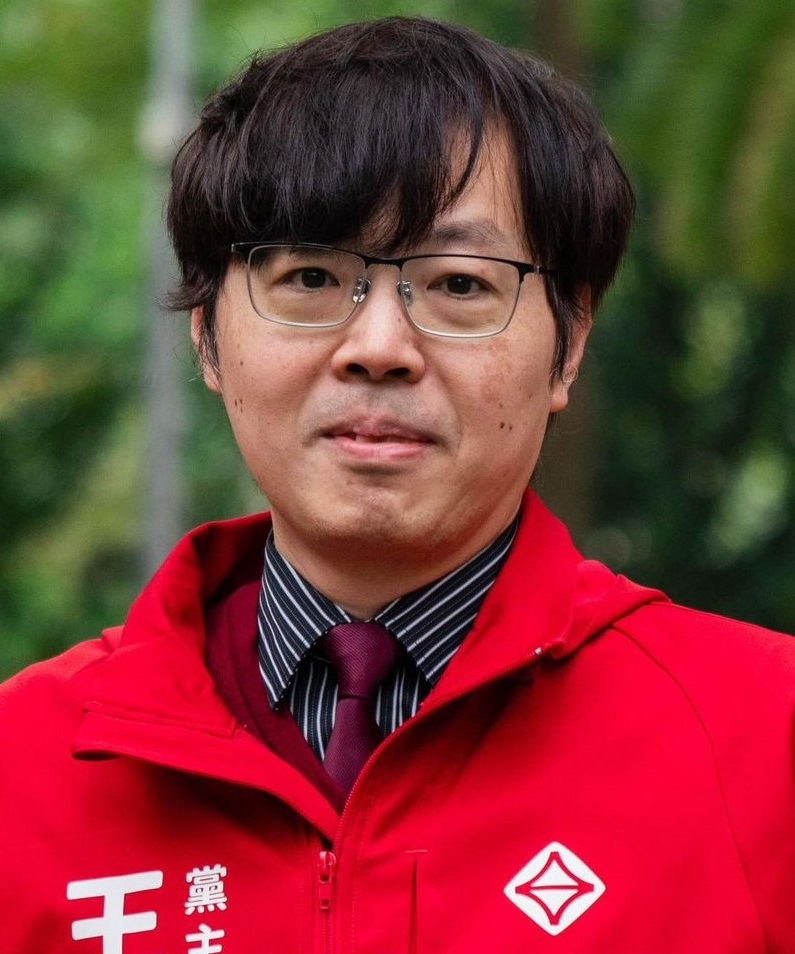

2nd Chairperson of the Taiwan Statebuilding Party
- Incumbent
- Assumed office 17 January 2023
- Preceded by: Chen Yi-chi

2nd Secretary-General of the Taiwan Statebuilding Party
- In office 25 March 2020 – 17 January 2023
- Preceded by: Chen Hsin-yu
- Succeeded by: Vacant

Personal details
- Party: Taiwan Statebuilding Party
- Education: Paris 8 University Vincennes-Saint-Denis (PhD)

Wang Hsing-huan (Chinese and Taiwanese: 王興煥, Pe̍h-ōe-jī: Ông Heng-hoàn) is a Taiwanese politician who is the incumbent Chairperson of the Taiwan Statebuilding Party. He was the 2nd Secretary-General of the Taiwan Statebuilding Party.

== Education ==
Wang earned a PhD in philosophy from Paris 8 University Vincennes-Saint-Denis in Paris, France.

== Political career ==
Wang became the Chairperson of the Taiwan Statebuilding Party on 17 January 2023.
