= Kao Meng-ting =

Taiwanese civil engineer and politician (born 1954)

- 高孟定

Member of the Legislative Yuan
- In office 1 February 2002 – 31 January 2005
- Constituency: Yunlin County

Member of the National Assembly
- In office 1997–2000
- Constituency: Yunlin County

Personal details
- Born: 27 October 1952 (age 73) Yunlin, Taiwan
- Other political affiliations: Democratic Progressive Party (2003–?); Independent (1997–2003); Green Party Taiwan (until 1997)
- Education: Feng Chia University (BS); National Taiwan University (MS, PhD)

Kao Meng-ting (Chinese: 高孟定; born 20 October 1954) is a Taiwanese civil engineer and politician.

== Education and early career ==
Kao graduated from Feng Chia University with a bachelor's degree in urban planning and then earned a master's degree in civil engineering and her Ph.D. in civil engineering from National Taiwan University in 1987. His doctoral dissertation was titled, "A study on residential environment selection behavior" (Chinese: 住宅環境選擇行為之研究).

After receiving his doctorate, Kao taught at Feng Chia University and was a member of New Yunlin Radio Station board of directors.

== Political career ==
Kao won a seat in the third National Assembly as a member of Green Party Taiwan, but left the party in 1997. He was campaign manager and spokesman for independent candidate Chang Jung-wei in the 1999 Yunlin County Magistracy by-election. Kao himself was elected to the Legislative Yuan in 2001 as a representative of Yunlin County. At the start of his term in February 2002, Kao protested the leadership selection process in various legislative committees, positions that were easier to acquire for politicians that were in formal political parties. By March, Kao had not joined any legislative caucus. He considered membership in the Taiwan Solidarity Union, but never joined the party. In July, Kao advocated for the formation of an independent caucus. Such a body was established in August, and Kao was named its spokesman. In January 2003, he joined the Democratic Progressive Party. The next year, Kao accused Wang Jin-pyng of helping Chang Jung-wei secure a retrial on bribery charges dating to 1994. Kao, representing the Democratic Progressive Party, finished second in the Douliu mayoral by-election of 2008.
