= Robin Winkler =

Robin J. Winkler
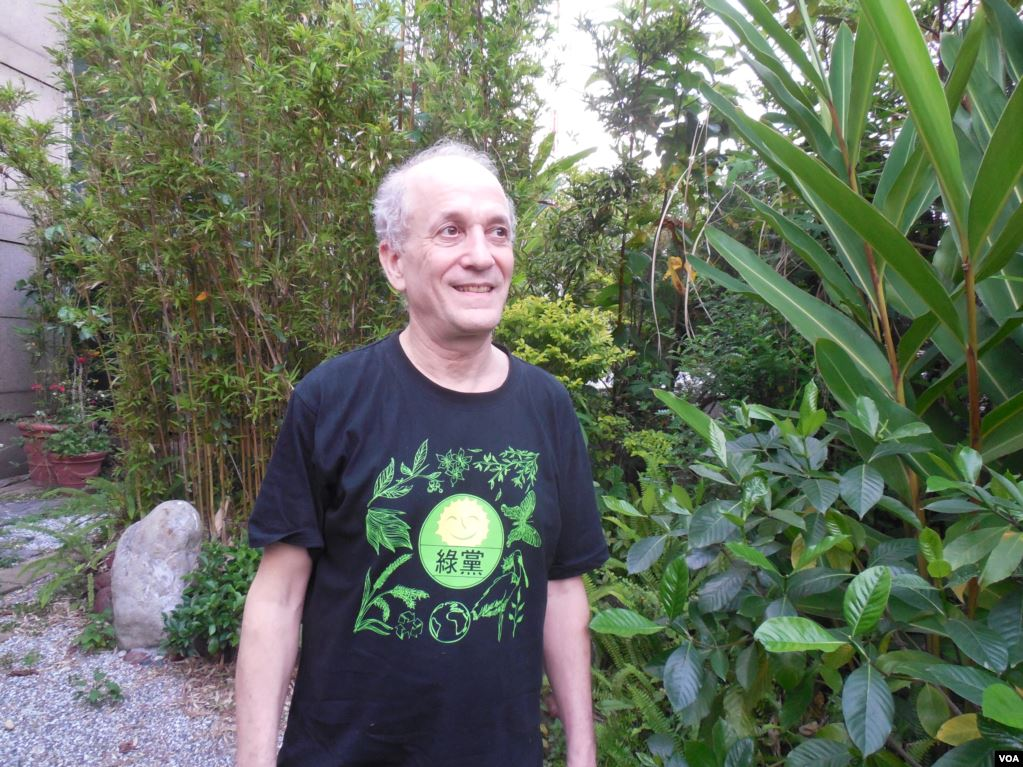
- Born: 1953 (age 72–73)
- Other name: 文魯彬
- Occupation: Lawyer
- Known for: Environmental activism
- Political party: Green Party Taiwan

Robin J. Winkler (Chinese: 文魯彬; pinyin: Wén Lǔbīn; Pe̍h-ōe-jī: Bûn Ló͘-pin; born 1953) is an American-born Taiwanese citizen who works as a lawyer and environmentalist.

== Career ==
Winkler has been a frequent frontline campaigner on green issues in Taiwan, having founded the legal environmental defense organization Wild at Heart Legal Defense Association (台灣蠻野心足生態協會) and spoken out on causes of environmental concern in Taiwan. In 2003, Winkler renounced his United States citizenship and acquired Taiwanese citizenship.

In February 2009, Winkler was considered for election to the Legislative Yuan seat previously held by Diane Lee, representing Green Party Taiwan. In the end, however, Winkler was not able to stand due to limitations in the law. Instead, Calvin Wun (溫炳原), a former secretary-general of the party, stood in the by-election.

Under the election laws of the Taiwan, Republic of China, naturalized citizens can stand for elections only after 10 years of citizenship. Winkler considers this requirement to be unconstitutional and has pursued the case through petition and an administrative lawsuit, the latter in an attempt to obtain a constitutional interpretation.

On 31 March 2015, Winkler declared his candidacy for the Legislative Yuan seat for the constituency Taipei 1, which would represent the northern part of Shihlin as well as Beitou. He withdrew from the race on November 25 without ever officially registering as a candidate.
