= Newtalk News =

Taiwanese news website

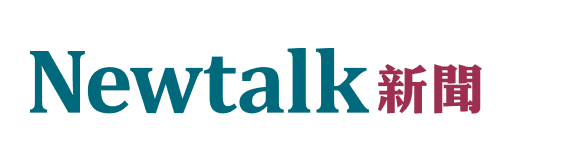
- Native name: Newtalk新聞
- Type: News website
- Owner(s): Tu Yao-ren (Sole director since 2024)
- Founder: Su Tzen-ping
- Publisher: Vanguard Media Co., Ltd.
- President: Su Tzen-ping
- Editor: Zhang Zheng-lin
- Founded: September 1, 2009; 17 years ago
- Political alignment: Pan-Green
- Language: Traditional Chinese
- Headquarters: No. 39, Lane 141, Hang'ai Road, Neihu District, Taipei, Taiwan
- Website: newtalk.tw

Vanguard Media Co., Ltd.
- Type: Private company
- Traded as: Unlisted
- Industry: News publishing
- Founded: July 24, 2009; 17 years ago
- Headquarters: No. 39, Lane 141, Hang'ai Road, Neihu District, Taipei, Taiwan
- Key people: Tu Yao-ren (Chairman)
- Products: Chinese-language online media
- Total equity: NT$50,000,000
- Website: newtalk.tw

Newtalk News (Chinese: Newtalk新聞) or formerly Newtalk (Chinese: 新頭殼; pinyin: Xīntóuké; Wade–Giles: Hsin^{1}-t'ou^{2}-k'o^{2}) is an online news platform operated by Vanguard Media Co., Ltd. in Taiwan. It was launched on September 1, 2009. The publication covers news about politics.
