= Kao Cheng-yan =

Taiwanese activist (born 1948)

- 高成炎
- Born: October 3, 1948 (age 78); Taipei, Taiwan
- Education: National Taiwan University (BS); University of Wisconsin (MS, MS, PhD)
- Political party: Green Party Taiwan
- Scientific career
- Fields: Computer science

Kao Cheng-yan (Chinese: 高成炎; pinyin: Gāo Chéngyán; Pe̍h-ōe-jī: Ko Sêng-iām; born October 3, 1948) is a Taiwanese computer scientist and activist who is founding chair of the Green Party Taiwan and a member of the Taiwan Environmental Protection Union. Professionally, Kuo is a professor of computer science and bioinformatics at National Taiwan University.

== Early life and education ==
Kao was born in Taipei. His father was the owner of a Taipei factory. After graduating from Taipei Municipal Chien Kuo High School in 1967, he studied mathematics as an undergraduate at National Taiwan University and received his Bachelor of Science (B.S.) in mathematics in 1971. He then completed graduate studies in the United States, where he earned a Master of Science (M.S.) in computer science in 1976, a second M.S. degree in statistics in 1978, and his Ph.D. in computer science in 1981, all from the University of Wisconsin–Madison.

== Early career ==
After receiving his doctorate, Kao worked for Ford Aerospace, Unisys, and General Electric from 1980 to 1989. During this period, he received a position at NASA's Johnson Space Center in Houston, Texas.

== Political career ==
He was a Taiwan independence activist during his student years in the United States. He ran for the Legislative Yuan on a Green Party ticket in 1998 and 2001 but failed to gain a seat.

In the 2004 ROC referendum, he debated DPP Legislator You Ching. In November 2019, Kao was ranked second on Green Party Taiwan's party list of legislative candidates contesting the 2020 elections.

He opposes the completion of the Lungmen Nuclear Power Plant, leading the campaign to gather more than 120,000 signatures in order to add a referendum to the national ballot. His opposition to nuclear power dates back to 1979.
