= Pan-Blue Coalition =

Political coalition in Taiwan (Republic of China)

Pan-Blue Coalition 泛藍聯盟
- Leader: Cheng Li-wun
- Ideology: Majority: Conservatism (Taiwanese); Three Principles of the People; Chinese nationalism; Anti–Taiwan independence; Factions: Anti-communism; Chinese unification; ROC independence; National conservatism; Liberal conservatism; Third Way
- Political position: Majority: Centre-right to right-wing Factions: Centre to far-right
- Opponents: Pan-Green Coalition; Taiwan Go Go
- Colours: Blue
- Legislative Yuan: 54 / 113 (48%)

Pan-Blue coalition
- Traditional Chinese: 泛藍聯盟
- Simplified Chinese: 泛蓝联盟
Transcriptions
Standard Mandarin
- Hanyu Pinyin: Fànlán Liánméng
- Bopomofo: ㄈㄢˋ ㄌㄢˊ ㄌㄧㄢˊ ㄇㄥˊ
- Wade–Giles: Fan^{4}-lan^{2} Lien^{2}-meng^{2}
- Tongyong Pinyin: Fàn-lán Lián-méng
- IPA: [fân.lǎn ljɛ̌n.mə̌ŋ]
Southern Min
- Hokkien POJ: Hoān-lâm-liân-bêng

Pan-Blue force
- Traditional Chinese: 泛藍軍
- Simplified Chinese: 泛蓝军
Transcriptions
Standard Mandarin
- Hanyu Pinyin: Fànlán Jūn
- Bopomofo: ㄈㄢˋ ㄌㄢˊ ㄐㄩㄣ
- Wade–Giles: Fan^{4}-lan^{2} Chün^{1}
- Tongyong Pinyin: Fàn-lán Jyun
- IPA: [fân.lǎn tɕýn]
Southern Min
- Hokkien POJ: Hoān-lâm-kun

Pan-Blue groups
- Traditional Chinese: 藍營
- Simplified Chinese: 蓝营
Transcriptions
Standard Mandarin
- Hanyu Pinyin: Lán Yíng
- Bopomofo: ㄌㄢˊ ㄧㄥˊ
- Wade–Giles: Lan^{2} Ying^{2}
- Tongyong Pinyin: Lán Yíng
- IPA: [lǎn ǐŋ]
Southern Min
- Hokkien POJ: Lâm-iânn

The Pan-Blue Coalition, Pan-Blue force, or Pan-Blue group is a political coalition in the Republic of China (Taiwan) consisting of the Kuomintang (KMT), the People First Party (PFP), the New Party (CNP), the Non-Partisan Solidarity Union (NPSU), and the Young China Party (YCP). The name comes from the party color of the Kuomintang.

Regarding the political status of Taiwan, the coalition primarily maintains that the Republic of China instead of the People's Republic of China is the legitimate government of China. It also favors a Chinese and Taiwanese dual identity over an exclusive Taiwanese identity and backs greater friendly exchange with mainland China, as opposed to the Pan-Green Coalition which opposes Chinese identity in Taiwan.

== Political stance ==
The Pan-Blue Coalition's political stance can be characterized as centre-right to right-wing, conservative and being of Republic of China–centered Chinese nationalism.

Originally, the Pan-Blue Coalition was associated with Chinese unification, but has moved towards a more conservative position supporting the present status quo, while rejecting immediate unification with mainland China. It now argues that reunification is possible only after the communist regime in mainland China dissolves or transitions to a democracy either as a new democratic government or with the re-establishment of Sun Yat-sen's Republic of China government which fled to Taiwan after the Chinese Civil War. This would also allow the body of Chiang Kai-shek to be returned to his ancestral home in Xikou.

== History ==
=== Lee Teng-hui presidency: 1988–2000 ===
Throughout the 1990s, the Kuomintang (KMT) consisted of an uneasy relationship between those party members who had mainland China backgrounds (came from mainland China in 1949) and Taiwanese political elites, Taiwanese factions led by President Lee Teng-hui, who supported a stronger Taiwanese identity and distinction from Chinese nationalism. Lee won the party control after the indirect election in 1990. This led to a split in the early 1990s, when the New Party was formed by the anti-Lee dissidents in the KMT. After the dissidents of KMT members left, the KMT remained loyal and with control by President Lee Teng-hui throughout his presidency.

During the 2000 presidential election, Lee Teng-hui arranged for Lien Chan to be nominated as Kuomintang candidate for president rather than the more popular James Soong, who left the party and formed his own People First Party after both he and Lien were defeated by Chen Shui-bian in the presidential elections. Though Chen and the DPP won the presidency, pro-KMT lawmakers held 140 out of 225 seats in the Legislative Yuan. Soong and Lien later formed a coalition in opposition to the DPP minority government.

=== First time in opposition: 2000–2008 ===
In the 2000 presidential election itself, the split in Kuomintang votes between Soong and Lien led in part to the election of Chen Shui-bian. After the election, there was widespread anger within the Kuomintang against Lee Teng-hui, who was expelled for forming his own pro-Taiwan independence party, the Taiwan Solidarity Union. After Lee's expulsion, the Kuomintang moved its policies back to a more conservative one and began informal but close cooperation with the People First Party and the New Party. This coalition became informally known as the Pan-Blue Coalition. Although the members of the Pan-Blue Coalition maintain separate party structures, they closely cooperate in large part to ensure that electoral strategies are coordinated, so that votes are not split among them leading to a victory by the Pan-Green Coalition.

The KMT and PFP ran a combined ticket in the 2004 presidential elections with Lien Chan running for president and James Soong running for vice president. The campaign emblem for the Lien-Soong campaign was a two-seat bicycle with a blue (the color of the KMT) figure in the first seat and an orange (the color of the PFP) figure in the second.

There were talks in late 2004 that the KMT and the PFP would merge into one party in 2005, but these talks have been put on hold. In the 2004 legislative election the three parties from the pan-blue coalition organized themselves to properly divide up the votes (配票) to prevent splitting the vote. The New Party ran all but one of its candidates under the KMT banner. The result was that the KMT gained 11 more seats and the PFP lost 12 seats. Right after the election, PFP chairman James Soong began criticizing the KMT for sacrificing the PFP for its own gains and stated that he would not participate in any negotiations regarding to the two parties' merge. Soong's remarks have been strongly criticized by the KMT, a majority of PFP members, and the New Party, whose rank and file were largely absorbed by the PFP following the 2001 elections. Nonetheless, shortly after the legislative election, the PFP legislative caucus agreed to cooperate with the DPP over the investigation into the KMT's finances. On 24 February 2005, James Soong met with President Chen for the first time in four years and issued a 10-point declaration supporting the name "Republic of China", the status quo in cross-strait relations, and the opening of the Three Links. Unlike Soong, Lien did not respond to the offer from Chen to meet.

However, after the 2005 Pan-Blue visits to mainland China, Soong and Chen stopped their partnership. The popular Taipei mayor Ma Ying-jeou was also elected the new head of the Kuomintang, and was considered the leading contender for the KMT nomination in the 2008 presidential election. However, it was uncertain whether the KMT and PFP could agree to field a common ticket. On the 2005 chairmanship election, Soong had made a televised endorsement of Ma's opponent Wang Jin-pyng.

In the December 2005 3-in-1 local elections, the KMT made large gains and held 14 seats, the DPP suffered defeat and held only six, the PFP retained only one, and the TSU was completely shut out. Ma Ying-jeou was now virtually assured of leading the KMT and pan-blues for the 2008 presidential election.

=== Ma Ying-jeou presidency: 2008–2016 ===
In the 2008 legislative election, the coalition won 86 of 113 seats in the Legislative Yuan, giving it the supermajority needed to recall the president and pass constitutional amendments for a referendum. The KMT, PFP, and NP coordinated their candidate lists in the new single-member constituency system. Candidates of the Non-Partisan Solidarity Union, who despite their party's official stance of non-affiliation, were deemed sympathetic to the coalition and ran unopposed by other blue candidates in almost all the seats it contested. The PFP ran almost all of their candidates under the KMT banner, with some placed under the KMT party list. While having all its district candidates run under the KMT banner, the New Party ran its own party list but failed to gain the 5% threshold for representation. The Kuomintang controlled the Legislative Yuan during the Ma Ying-jeou presidency from 2008 to 2016.

=== In opposition during Tsai Ing-wen presidency: 2016–2024 ===
In 2016 general election, the KMT lost the presidential election and, for the first time in the history of the Republic of China, the control in the Legislative Yuan. The Democratic Progressive Party (DPP) took control of the legislature for the first time, winning the presidency. The KMT became the largest opposition party. The PFP's leader James Soong, despite being a member of the coalition, cooperated with Tsai Ing-wen's administration, becoming the representative of Chinese Taipei in the APEC summit.

=== In opposition during Lai Ching-te presidency: 2024–present ===
Although Taiwan People's Party (TPP) (known as the "white camp") positions itself as a centrist party, its cooperative relationship with the KMT has prompted belief that it aligns more closely with the Pan-Blue camp. Prior to the 2024 presidential election, prospects for ‘blue-white cooperation’ had been met with optimism from both parties, as they sought to jointly minimise the DPP's chances of procuring a third consecutive term of presidency. The two opposition parties then engaged in negotiations to form a joint presidential ticket in November 2023, with the proposal that either the KMT's Hou Yu-ih or the TPP's Ko Wen-je would be selected as the presidential candidate and the other the vice-presidential candidate.

During this period, polls from Mirror Media indicated that support rates for both Ko-Hou ticket and Hou-Ko ticket would outperform their Lai-Hsiao counterpart, standing at 46.6% and 46.5% respectively. However, the alliance subsequently collapsed on 18 November following the disagreement over the selection method for the presidential and vice-presidential candidates, resulting in both Hou and Ko entering the race as separate presidential candidates. The division among Hou and Ko's overlapping support bases eventually led to vote-splitting, culminating in their defeat and the victory of DPP's Lai Ching-te, who holds dissimilar ideology with the other two candidates in major issues such as national defence and the view on the Cross-Strait Service Trade Agreement. But since Ko and Hou together secured 60% of the votes, Lai would likely not have won had the deal succeeded.

Despite this setback, an opposition coalition has still been established between the two parties in the Legislative Yuan since February 2024, forming a majority against the DPP's minority government. The two parties have since cooperated in numerous bill amendments, including the Act Governing the Legislative Yuan's Power, Act Governing the Allocation of Government Revenues and Expenditures, and others.

== Member parties ==
=== Current members ===
Party	Ideology	Leader
Kuomintang (KMT)	Conservatism	Cheng Li-wun
New Party (NP)	National conservatism	Wu Cherng-dean
People First Party (PFP)	Liberal conservatism	James Soong
Non-Partisan Solidarity Union (NPSU)	Third Way	Lin Pin-kuan

== Legislative strength ==
=== Legislative Yuan ===
Term	Member Party Seats	KMT Seats	NP Seats	PFP Seats	NPSU Seats
1st(1992)	95 / 130	95 / 95	-	-	-
2nd	95 / 162	95 / 95	-	-	-
3rd	106 / 164	85 / 106	21 / 106	-	-
4th	134 / 225	123 / 134	11 / 134	-	-
5th	115 / 225	68 / 115	1 / 115	46 / 115	-
6th	120 / 225	79 / 120	1 / 120	34 / 120	6 / 120
7th	85 / 113	81 / 85	-	1 / 85	3 / 85
8th	69 / 113	64 / 69	-	3 / 69	2 / 69
9th	39 / 113	35 / 39	-	3 / 39	1 / 39
10th	40 / 113	40 / 40 (Note: Includes two KMT-aligned Independents.)	-	-	-
11th	54 / 113	54 / 54	-	-	-

== Media ==
- China Times
- Commercial Times
- United Daily News
- China Television
- Chung T'ien Television
- TVBS

== See also ==
- History of the Republic of China
- Chinese nationalism in Taiwan
- Pan-Purple Coalition
- Pro–Republic of China sentiment
  - Pro-ROC camp (Hong Kong)
- Pro-Beijing camp (Taiwan)
- Taiwan Go Go
