= Karen Yu =

Taiwanese politician

Yu Wan-ju MLY
- 余宛如
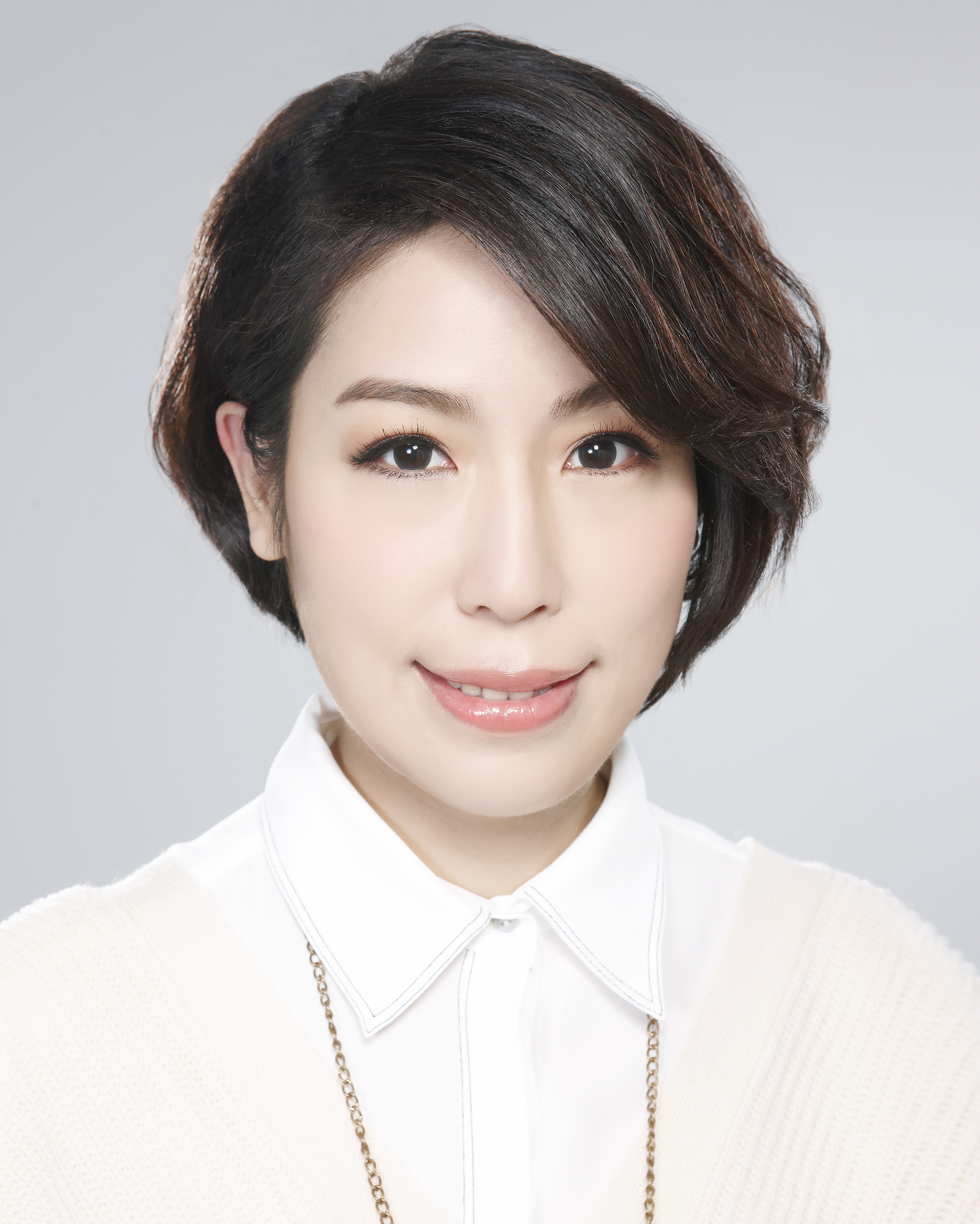
- Yu in 2016

Member of the Legislative Yuan
- In office 1 February 2016 – 31 January 2020
- Constituency: Republic of China

Personal details
- Born: 11 June 1980 (age 46) Taipei, Taiwan
- Party: Democratic Progressive Party (since 2015); Green Party Taiwan (until 2015)
- Education: National Taiwan University (BA, MBA); SOAS University of London (MSc)

Yu Wan-ju (Chinese: 余宛如; pinyin: Yú Wǎnrú; Pe̍h-ōe-jī: Û Oán-jû; born 11 June 1980), also known by her English name Karen Yu, is a Taiwanese politician. She served a single term on the Legislative Yuan as a member of the Democratic Progressive Party.

== Education ==
After graduating from Taipei First Girls' High School, Yu studied economics at National Taiwan University and graduated with a bachelor's degree. She then earned a Master of Science (M.Sc.) in anthropology from the SOAS University of London in England and later earned Master of Business Administration (M.B.A.) in finance from National Taiwan University.

== Pre-political career ==
She founded the cafe OKOGreen in 2008. The establishment served only coffee produced through fair trade practices, and supported environmentalism by partnering with Green Party Taiwan and the Taiwan Environmental Information Center. Yu has also served on the council of the Taiwan Fairtrade Association.

== Political career ==
Yu was co-chair of Green Party Taiwan from 2012 to 2015. She was listed eighth on the Democratic Progressive Party's proportional representation ballot during the 2016 legislative elections and won an at-large seat in the Legislative Yuan. After stepping down as a legislator, she was appointed director general of the Taoyuan City Government's Department of Information Technology.
