= Chen Yi-chi =

Taiwanese politician

- 陳奕齊
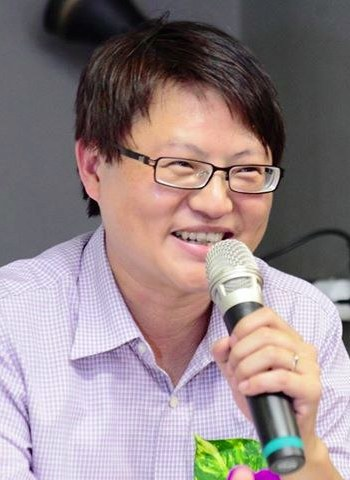

1st Chairperson of the Taiwan Statebuilding Party
- In office 15 May 2016 – 17 January 2023
- Preceded by: Position established
- Succeeded by: Wang Hsing-huan

Personal details
- Born: 31 August 1972 (age 53) Mackay Memorial Hospital, Puzi, Chiayi, Taiwan
- Party: Taiwan Statebuilding Party
- Education: National Chengchi University (BA); Leiden University (PhD)

Chinese name
- Traditional Chinese: 陳奕齊
- Simplified Chinese: 陈奕齐
Transcriptions
Standard Mandarin
- Hanyu Pinyin: Chén Yìqí
Southern Min
- Hokkien POJ: Tân E̍k-chê / Tân E̍k-chôe
- Tâi-lô: Tân I̍k-tsê / Tân I̍k-tsuê

Chen Yi-chi (Chinese: 陳奕齊; Pe̍h-ōe-jī: Tân E̍k-chê / Tân E̍k-chôe; born 27 August 1972) is a Taiwanese politician who was a co-founder and the first chairperson of the Taiwan Statebuilding Party. Before entering politics, Chen graduated from National Chengchi University with a bachelor's degree in diplomacy and earned a PhD from Leiden University.

Party political offices
New office	Chairman of the Taiwan Statebuilding Party; 2016–present	Incumbent
