= Taiwan Go Go =

Taiwan Go Go 台灣前進陣線
- Political position: Centre-left to left-wing
- Colours: Purple

Website
- https://taiwangogo.tw/

Taiwan Go Go (台灣前進陣線) is a political alliance organized in Taiwan since 16 December 2025 by four small extraparliamentary parties, namely New Power Party, Taiwan Obasang Political Equality Party, Taiwan Statebuilding Party, and Green Party Taiwan along with independents. The 2026 Taiwanese local elections will be its first campaign.

The name of the alliance refers to an incident during the 1971 Little League World Series in which the organization World United Formosans for Independence hired a small airplane to display a banner with the slogan “Go Go Taiwan” by flying over the stadium during the final game. The logo of the alliance depicts a flying fish.
