= Taiwan Statebuilding Party =

Political party in Taiwan

Taiwan Statebuilding Party 台灣基進
- Chairperson: Wang Hsing-huan
- Secretary: Vacant
- Founded: 15 May 2016
- Headquarters: Kaohsiung, Taiwan
- Ideology: Taiwanese independence; Progressivism (Taiwanese); Radicalism; Anti-communism; Anti-imperialism
- Political position: See below
- National affiliation: Taiwan Go Go; Historical: Pan-Green Coalition
- Colours: Fire Brick
- Legislative Yuan: 0 / 113
- Municipal mayors: 0 / 6
- Magistrates/mayors: 0 / 16
- Councilors: 2 / 912
- Township/city mayors: 0 / 204

Website
- https://statebuilding.tw/

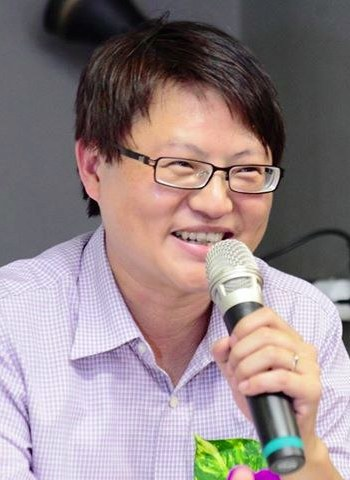
Founder and former chairperson, Chen Yi-chi.

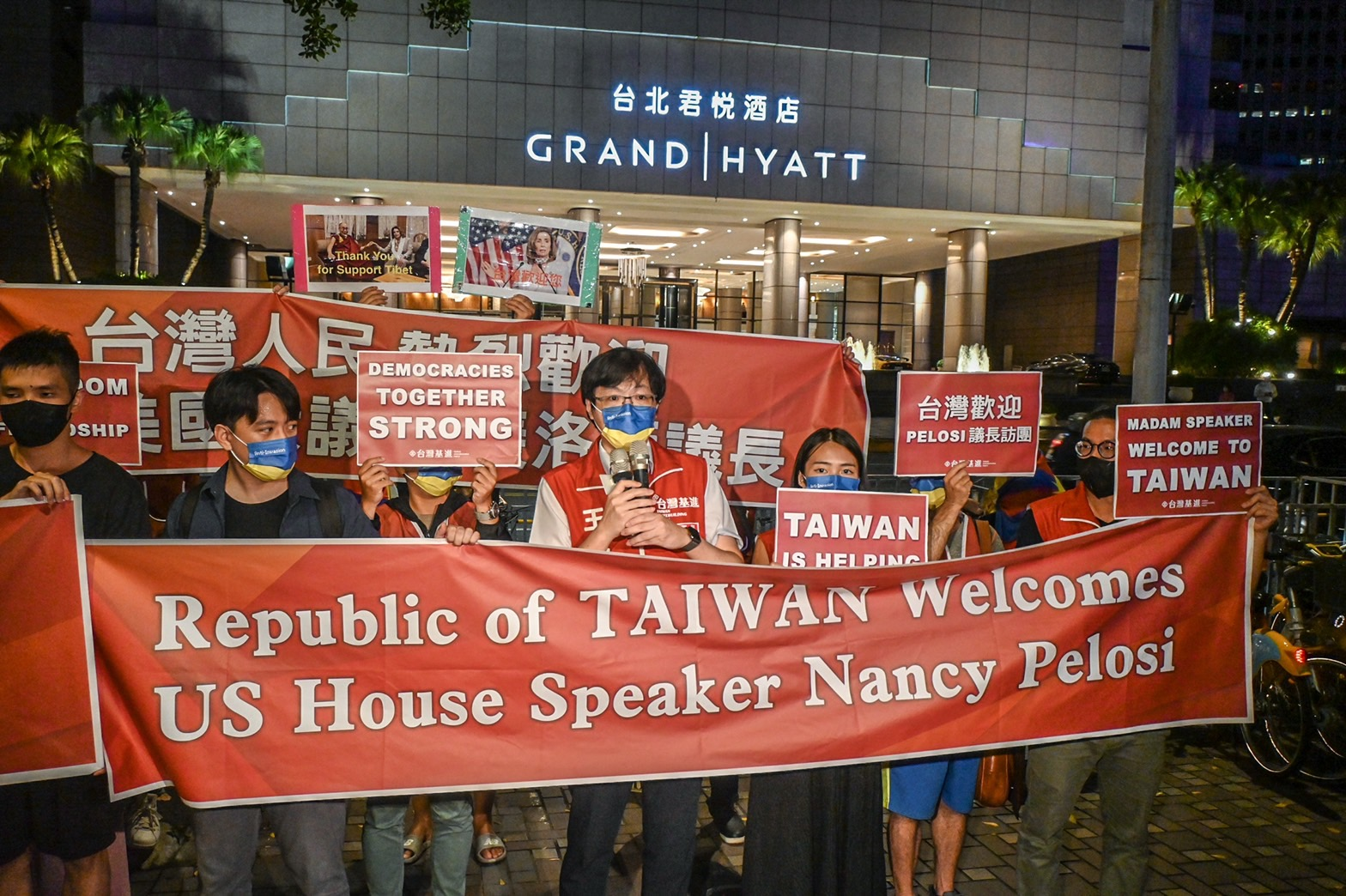
TSP welcoming U.S. House Speaker Nancy Pelosi's delegation outside Grand Hyatt Taipei

The Taiwan Statebuilding Party (TSP or SBP; Chinese: 台灣基進; pinyin: Táiwān Jījìn; Pe̍h-ōe-jī: Tâi-oân Ki-chìn) is a political party in the Republic of China (Taiwan). The party was established in 2016 as Taiwan Radical Wings. The party is considered a rather close ally of the Democratic Progressive Party, while fighting to replace opposition parties whom TSP unilaterally claims as "not loyal to Taiwan", such as Kuomintang and Taiwan People's Party. In the 2024 Taiwanese legislative election, TSP failed to gain any seat in the Legislative Yuan and lost its status as a national political party.

== History ==
As of 2018, the chairperson was Chen Yi-chi. In the 2020 Taiwanese legislative election, the party won one seat, with Chen Po-wei becoming its first member of the Legislative Yuan. In October 2021, Chen became the first member of the Legislative Yuan to be successfully recalled, ending his term less than two years into office. Votes for Chen's recall numbered 77,899, against 73,433 opposing his recall. Votes supporting the recall topped 25% of the eligible electorate (73,744), with 51.72 percent voter turnout. Per Article 92 of the Civil Servants Election and Recall Act, Chen would be ineligible to run for the Legislative Yuan in Taichung's second district for the next four years. On 28 October 2021, he was officially dismissed from the Legislative Yuan.

== Policies ==
TSP has been described as a left-wing, progressive and pro-Taiwanese independence party, and is part of the Taiwan independence Left. However, media in opposition to the TSP have also sometimes described it as "not leftist" or even "far-right", criticising it for allegedly being complacent on labour rights issues and only in favour of progressivism but not libertarian socialism.

== Structure ==
=== Chair ===
- Current Chair: Chen Yi-chi (since May 2016)

=== Secretary-General ===
- Current Secretary-General: Wang Hsing-huan (since September 2021)

== Election results ==
=== Legislative elections ===
| Election | Total seats won | Total votes | Share of votes | Changes | Party leader | Status | President |
|---|---|---|---|---|---|---|---|
| 2020 | 1 / 113 | 447,286 | 3.16% | ▲1 seat | Chen Yi-chi | 5th party | Tsai Ing-wen |
| 2024 | 0 / 113 | 95,078 | 0.69% | ▼0 seat | Chen Yi-chi | Did not represent | Lai Ching-te |

=== Local elections ===
| Election | Magistrates and mayors | Councillors | Township/city mayors | Township/city council representatives | Village chiefs | Party leader |
|---|---|---|---|---|---|---|
| 2018 unified | 0 / 22 | 0 / 912 | 0 / 204 | 1 / 2,148 | 0 / 7,744 | Chen Yi-chi |
| 2022 unified | 0 / 22 | 2 / 910 | 0 / 204 | 0 / 2,139 | 0 / 7,748 | Chen Yi-chi |
