= Legislative Yuan constituencies in Taoyuan City =

Taoyuan City electoral constituencies (Chinese: 桃園市選舉區) consist of 6 single-member constituencies in Taoyuan, Taiwan, each represented by a member of the Republic of China Legislative Yuan.

== Current constituencies ==
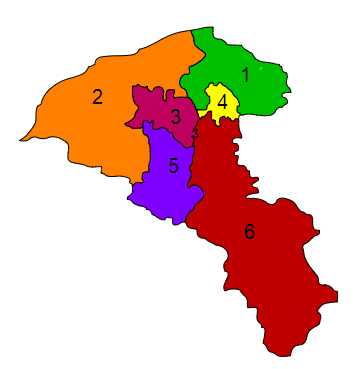
Map of Taoyuan City's legislative districts

Taoyuan City was formerly Taoyuan County and all constituencies were named accordingly.

- Taoyuan City Constituency 1 - Luzhu, Guishan, Taoyuan (11 villages)
- Taoyuan City Constituency 2 - Yangmei, Xinwu, Guanyin, Dayuan
- Taoyuan City Constituency 3 - Zhongli (73 villages)
- Taoyuan City Constituency 4 - Taoyuan (65 villages)
- Taoyuan City Constituency 5 - Pingzhen, Longtan
- Taoyuan City Constituency 6 - Bade, Daxi, Fuxing, Zhongli (12 villages)

== Legislators ==
Kuomintang Democratic Progressive Party Independent

Election	1	2	3	4	5	6
2008 7th	Chen Ken-te	Liao Cheng-ching (2008-2010)^{1}	John Wu (2008-2018)^{2}	Yang Li-huan	Chu Fong-chi	Sun Ta-chien
2010 by-election	Chen Ken-te	Kuo Jung-tsung(2010-2012)	Huang Jen-shu(2010-2012)	Yang Li-huan	Chu Fong-chi	Sun Ta-chien
2012 8th	Chen Ken-te	Liao Cheng-ching	Apollo Chen	Yang Li-huan	Lu Yu-ling	Sun Ta-chien
2016 9th	Cheng Yun-peng	Chen Lai Su-mei	Apollo Chen	Cheng Pao-ching	Lu Yu-ling	Chao Cheng-yu
2020 10th	Cheng Yun-peng	Huang Shih-chieh	Lu Ming-che	Wan Mei-ling	Lu Yu-ling	Chao Cheng-yu
2024 11th	Niu Hsu-ting	Tu Chuan-chi	Lu Ming-che	Wan Mei-ling	Lu Yu-ling	Chiu Jo-hua

Liao Cheng-ching resigned in 2009 due to election fraud.

John Wu resigned in 2009 after his election as Taoyuan County magistrate.

== Election results ==
=== 2016 ===
2016 legislative election
		Elected			Runner-up		
Incumbent	Constituency	Candidate	Party	Votes (%)	Candidate	Party	Votes (%)
KMT; Chen Ken-te	1	Cheng Yun-peng	DPP	47.25%	Chen Ken-te	Kuomintang	44.06%
Kuomintang; Liao Cheng-ching	2	Chen Lai Su-mei	DPP	50.17%	Liao Cheng-ching	Kuomintang	42.73%
Kuomintang; Apollo Chen	3	Apollo Chen	Kuomintang	44.71%	Hsu Jing-wen	DPP	44.48%
Kuomintang; Yang Li-huan	4	Cheng Pao-ching	DPP	50.05%	Yang Li-huan	Kuomintang	49.95%
Kuomintang; Lu Yu-ling	5	Lu Yu-ling	Kuomintang	43.86%	Chang Zhao-liang	DPP	42.20%
Kuomintang; Sun Ta-chien	6	Chao Cheng-yu	Independent	46.53%	Sun Ta-chien	Kuomintang	46.06%
