= Huang Shih-chieh (politician) =

Taiwanese politician

- 黃世杰
- Official portrait, 2026

Deputy Minister of Justice
- In office 20 May 2024 – 3 April 2026
- Minister: Cheng Ming-chien
- Preceded by: Tsai Pi-chung
- Succeeded by: Huang Mou-hsin

Member of the Legislative Yuan
- In office 1 February 2020 – 31 January 2024
- Preceded by: Chen Lai Su-mei
- Succeeded by: Tu Chuan-chi
- Constituency: Taoyuan II

Personal details
- Born: 5 January 1979 (age 47) Taipei, Taiwan
- Party: Democratic Progressive Party
- Education: National Taiwan University (BA, LLB, LLM); Columbia University (LLM)

Huang Shih-chieh (Chinese: 黃世杰; born 5 January 1979) is a Taiwanese lawyer and politician who served as Deputy Minister of Justice from 2024 to 2026. He previously served as a Member of the Legislative Yuan from 2020 to 2024.

== Early life and education ==
Huang was born on 5 January 1979 in Taipei, Taiwan. His ancestors were Hakka Chinese farmers who had lived for generations in Xinwu District, Taoyuan, where he spent much of his childhood. His paternal grandparents were farmers. His father, Huang Chin-te (黃金德), served four terms as a Taoyuan County councilor, including a term as deputy speaker of the county council, and later as general manager of the Taoyuan Irrigation Association.

Huang spent part of his childhood living with his grandparents in Xinwu, where he initially spoke only a dialect of the Hakka language and could not speak Mandarin Chinese. He later moved to Zhongl, where he learned Mandarin. After junior high school, he was admitted to Taipei Municipal Chien Kuo High School, where he was a classmate of future Taipei mayor Chiang Wan-an. He graduated at the top of his high school class.

After high school, Huang attended National Taiwan University (NTU), where he double majored in law and sociology and graduated with two bachelor's degrees. He was subsequently admitted to the university's graduate law program with the highest scores on its entrance examination. In 2001, he placed first nationally in Taiwan's bar examination and also passed the special civil service examination qualifying candidates for judicial and prosecutorial positions.

Huang earned a Master of Laws (LL.M.) degree from National Taiwan University in 2005. His master's thesis was titled, Compilation of Legal Codes, Bureaucratic Administration, and Criminal Adjudication in the Ming and Qing Dynasties (明清的律典編纂、官僚行政與刑案審判). He then pursued graduate studies in the United States, earning a second LL.M. degree from Columbia Law School at Columbia University.

== Early career ==
After qualifying as a lawyer, Huang entered private practice. He worked as a lawyer at the Taiwan office of Baker McKenzie, known locally as International Commerce Law Offices (國際通商法律事務所). Rather than pursuing a legal practice, he initially intended to enter academia and considered pursuing a doctoral degree after completing his graduate studies at Columbia University. After returning to Taiwan, he worked at Academia Sinica as a research assistant for a former academic adviser.

In December 2014, Taoyuan mayor Cheng Wen-tsan appointed Huang as a senior counselor (參議) in his incoming municipal administration to assist the mayor's office with legal affairs. Huang had joined the administration partly through a recommendation from an older acquaintance, at a time when Cheng was recruiting professionals with connections to Taoyuan. Initially appointed as a senior counselor, Huang later became a municipal adviser (顧問).
