= Wu Zhiyang =

Wu Zhiyang (吳志揚) may refer to:

- John Wu (born 1969), Taiwanese politician
- Wu Jyh-Yang (born 1962), former president of Yuan Ze University employed from February 2016 to January 2022
