= Taoyuan City Constituency 6 =

Constituency of the Legislative Yuan of Taiwan

- Single-member constituency for the Legislative Yuan
- District(s): Bade, Daxi, Fuxing, & parts of Zhongli

Current constituency
- Created: 2008
- Members: Sun Ta-chien (2008–2016); Zhao Jheng-yu (2016–2024); Chiu Jo-Hua (2024-)

Taoyuan City Constituency 6 (Chinese: 桃園市第六選舉區; pinyin: Táoyuán Shì Dì-liù Xuǎnjǔ Qū) includes Bade, Daxi, Fuxing, and part of Zhongli in southern Taoyuan City. The district was formerly known as Taoyuan County Constituency 6 (2008–2014) and was created in 2008, when all local constituencies of the Legislative Yuan were reorganized to become single-member districts.

== Current district ==
- Bade
- Daxi
- Fuxing
- Zhongli:
  - urban villages (12 in total): Xingren(興仁里), Ziqiang(自強里), Zhongzheng(中正里), Zhongshan(中山里), Duxing(篤行里), Ren'ai(仁愛里), Renhe(仁和里), Renxiang(仁祥里), Huaxun(華勛里), Rende(仁德里), Zhongjian(中堅里), Long'an(龍安里)

== Legislators ==
Representative	Party	Dates	Notes
Sun Ta-chien	Kuomintang	2008–2016	
Zhao Jheng-yu	Independent	2016–2024	
Chiu Jo-Hua	Kuomintang	2024-	Incumbent

== Election results ==
=== 2016 ===
Legislative Election 2016: Taoyuan City Constituency 6
Party	Candidate	Votes	%	±%
Independent	Zhao Jheng-yu	76,278	46.53	
Kuomintang	Sun Ta-chien	75,510	46.06	
Others	Lü Dongjie	7,374	4.50	
Others	Zheng Zhenyuan	2,700	1.65	
Others	Lan Dashan	1,272	0.78	
Independent	Yang Jinxuan	800	0.48	
Majority		768	0.47	
Total valid votes		163,934	98.01	
Rejected ballots		3,323	1.99	
Independent gain from Kuomintang		Swing		
Turnout		167,257	67.38	
Registered electors		248,233		

=== 2020 ===
Legislative Election 2020: Taoyuan City Constituency 6
Party	Candidate	Votes	%	±%
Independent	Zhao Jheng-yu	115,496	58.44	
Kuomintang	Apollo Chen	82,152	41.56	
Total valid votes		201,745	98.01	
Rejected ballots		4,097		
Independent gain from Kuomintang		Swing		
Turnout		197,648		
Registered electors		270,879		

=== 2024 ===
Legislative Election 2024: Taoyuan City Constituency 6
Party	Candidate	Votes	%	±%
Kuomintang	Chiu Jo-Hua	81,513	40.93	−0.63
Independent	Zhao Jheng-yu	76,346	38.34	−20.10
People's	Li Mu Yan	34,183	17.67	
Fou Kang Lian Meng Dang	Liu Ruei Chen	2,689	1.35	
Independent	Yeh Tang Yu	2,523	1.27	
The People Union Party	Wong Shau Ting	890	0.45	
Majority		5,167	2.59	
Total valid votes		199,144		
Kuomintang gain from Independent		Swing		
