= Education in Taoyuan City =

Education in Taoyuan City, Republic of China, below tertiary level, is through an established school system that consists of elementary schools, junior high schools, and senior high schools. It is managed by the Education Department of the Taoyuan City Government. The director is Ming-Wen Chang. In the four-year period 2003–2007, 85 billion NT dollars were spent on education.

== Specific schools ==
=== Ba-De Junior High School ===
Ba-De Junior High School is a Junior High School in Bade District. It educates around 1,750 students in grades 7–9. Bade Junior High is 8 km away from Taoyuan City and 6 km to Yingge District, New Taipei City in the north, 8 km, from Zhongli District in the south, and 6 km to Daxi District in the west. For transportation, there are buses operated by Taoyuan Bus and Yatung Bus running to the school.

==== History ====
In 1961, with the effort of Mr. Chiu Sheng, the Township Mayor, and other local personalities the Bade branch of Dashi Junior High School was granted the admittance to be built, and Mr Wang Huan-chi was appointed as the head.

In September 1963, it was allowed to be renamed as Taoyuan County Bade Middle School School, and Mr Wang Huan-chi, the head of the branch, was appointed as the first principal. In 1968, the government offered 9 years of free education, and the school was renamed as Taoyuan County Bade Junior High School.

The past principals were Mr. Wang Ting-hsun, Mr. Fanchian Wen-cheng, Mr. Li Shen-huo, Mr. Hsu Ching-fa, and Ms. Chen Kuai-yu.

=== Chu-Wei Junior High School ===
This school is located in Dayuan District. The north borders Chuwei Fishing Port, and the south is near to the Taoyuan International Airport.

==== History ====
In 1969, due to the noises made by the airplanes, the idea of moving school was brought up. In 1983, the county magistrate, Mr. Hung,-chih, Hsu inaugurated the construction, which was completed in 1984.

=== Da-Luen Junior High School ===
In 1961 Hsin Ming Junior High School, Da Luen, was first founded. In August 1963 DLJH was formally established. Mr. Kuo-Tung Cheng was appointed as the first principal. In September 1969, Mr. Han-Chiang Tang replaced Mr. Cheng as the second principal, through to Mr. Pang-Chiu Liu who was appointed as the seventh principal in August 2001

=== Da-Po Junior High School ===
This school is located on Lin, Dapo Village, Xinwu District, Taoyuan City.

==== History ====
The people here work mainly in agriculture, both farming and fishing, so the cultural standard here is considered to be not very high. Young people had to go a long way to Hsin-Wu, Fu-Kang and Yung-An for study before 1977, because there was not a school nearby. Then the local people bought a piece of land about 3.171 hectares through the helps from the local government of Taoyuan county and the township administration office of Hsin-Wu village to set up the branch of S.W.J.H.S, with only five classes, here by 1977, headed by Mr. Huang-Cheng-Hsiung as the first director.

=== Da-Si Junior High School ===
This junior high school is located on Mingcheng East Road, Daxi District on a campus of 5.3 hectares.

==== History ====
The school was founded on 17 October 1946 named 'Dasi Junior High School'. The school was renamed 'Taoyuan County Dasi Junior High School' in 1968 when government executed the 9 year national standard education. The name changed to 'Wu Ling National Junior High School' in 1975. Finally, the school was renamed as 'Taoyuan County, Dasi Junior High School' in August 1992. The first location was on the east side of Dasi Town Chung Ching Park; the campus was around 1 hectare. In 1982, to allow the establishment of evening classes, they moved to the present campus in August 1985.

=== Dong-Sing Junior High School ===
This school is located on Guangjhou Rd., Zhongli District, Taoyuan City.

==== History ====
Dong-Sing Junior High School was established in 1985. Due to the growth of the population in the community, the number of the classes has boosted rapidly from 10 to 113. There are currently 84 classes under the advice from the authority.

=== Hsin-Ming Junior High School ===
Hsin-Ming Junior High was established in the summer of 1956, being named as Taoyuan County Yangmei High School Hsin-Ming Division. Principal Fang-chie Chang retained Mr. Shi-Tao Lee as the Division Supervisor. The temporary campus of Hsin-Ming was located in Hsin-Jie Temple, and the first graduates amounted to 880 persons and 16 classes. In 1958, Hsin-Ming bought the present campus from Provincial Law and Commerce College, and it has become the permanent home of Hsin-Ming since then. Hsin-Ming has undertaken several times of name-changing, and it's illustrated as following.

As permitted, Hsin-Ming was independent in August 1959 as Taoyuan County Hsin-Ming Preliminary High School. The province authority assigned Hsin-Chao Hsieh as the first principal. Da-Luen and Nei-Li Divisions were set in 1961, and each of them was independent two years later. Due to “Nine-year Obligatory Education” announced in 1968, the school title was officially changed as Hsin-Ming Junior High School.

Principal Hsieh resigned in 1975. Director of Social Education Department in Education Bureau, Lin-Long Tsai was assigned as Acting Principal, and he became the principal in 1977. Principal Tsai transferred to Jian-Kuo Junior High School in February 1983. Jin-Chow Tsai took the position of principal and retired in February 1990.

The following principal was Wen-Bin Lee who established Class of Music Talents to foster students with gifts in music. Students amounted to 3500 persons (74 classes) during 1992 to 1994. Because of the re-demarcation of the school district and the establishment of Ping-Hsin Junior High School, Hsin-Ming was shrunk to 1500 persons (45 classes) by years. In 1999, Principal Lin was exchanged with the principal of Long-Gung Junior High School, Fang-Sun Lee.

Principal Lee, in his term during 2002, developed the Experimental Class of English Talents. However, due to the mutation of government policy, this project was abandoned right after the graduation of students. Hsin-Ming Baseball Team won the Championship of National Teen Baseball of Pony League and the third place of Teen Baseball of Asian Pony League. Principal Lee retired in August 2003, and Jin-Ming Dai took the position of Acting Principal until July 2004.

Education Bureau had assigned principal of Hsin-Po Junior High School, Yi-Bin Zheng to be the new principal of Hsin-Ming Junior High School since August 2004. Class for Talented Athletes was established in August 2004 to recruit excellent students who specialized in baseball. Class for Special Education was organized in August 2005. With the ground-breaking success, in 2005, Hsin-Ming Orchestra won the first place of Junior High Group in Taoyuan County, and it was on behalf of Taoyuan County to win the second place of the national competition. In the same year, Hsin-Ming Baseball Team won the Championship of National Baseball Game of Junior High School. This honor has never been earned by a team located more northern than Taichung County. In 2006, Hsin-Ming won the Championship of Taipei International Teenager Baseball Invitation Competition, the first place in qualification and the second place in the final of Taiwan-Japan International Teenager Invitation Competition.

With rich harvest of fifty-year school history of Hsin-Ming Junior High School, Hsin-Ming still needs to foster competitive and cosmopolitan citizens to accomplish the mission of education. From now on, Hsin-Ming is set up for excellent environment for study and inventive techniques of teaching to help students develop multiple abilities and make the success for all.

=== Hsing-Nan Junior High School ===
Hsing-Nan Junior High School is a Junior High School is in Taoyuan City. The school was founded on December 22, 1960 with 2.683 hectares of land. In the spring of 1961, Mr. Hsieh Hsin-Chao, the principal of Hsin-Ming Junior High School, was in charge of all the affairs in the organization, and Mr. Wang Hui-Fu, was appointed the first principal at that year. Mr. Chang Chi-Hsiang became the second principal in 1967, followed by Mr. Chiang Te-Mao as the third principal in 1979 and Mr. Yen Shi-Wei as the fourth principal in 1986. Ms. Hung Ching-Fang succeeded as the fifth principal in 1998 and finally, Ms. Li Jui-Chi is the current principal

=== Jhong-Fu Elementary School ===
Jhong Fu Elementary School is located on Xiyuan Road, Zhongli District on a campus of 9280 square meters. Construction of the campus started in July 1997. The school began to enroll students on 1 August 1999.

=== Jie-Shou Junior High School ===
Zhongzheng Road, ZeRen Village, Fuxing District.

=== Long-Gong Junior High School ===
This school is situated on Longdong Rd., Zhongli District. The school was founded in 1968.

=== Lun-Sin Junior High School ===
This school is located on Lunyuon Road, Zhongli District.

==== History ====
In 1994, the Government provisioned the development of Long-Sing Junior High School. Following 5 years of planning and construction, the school officially opened in August 1999, with an initial enrollment of 513 students in 13 classes. Today, the school has expanded to 42 classes, with a total of 1,488 students.

=== Sin-Wu Junior High School ===
This school is located on Jhongsing Rd., Xinwu District on a campus site.

=== Ta-Han Junior High School ===
This school is located at Kong Jung Road, Daxi District on a county of 2.8931 hectares

==== History ====
In 1959, the forerunner of this school, was established at the present location with 1 hectare land. In August 1964. Wei-Wo Fu thought to build school. The Branch was first led by Mr. Fu-Sen Lin as the headmaster. The approval was issued by Dept of Education, Taiwan Provincial Government. In February 1968, Ta-han became independent from Ta-Hsi junior high school. In reply to the governmental policy of implementing the 9 Year National Education System as the extension for the existing 6 Year System. In August 1980, Wo-Chang Le served as the principal. In March 1984, Se-Lin Wang served as the principal. In March 1911, Yong-Kong Yang. served as the principal. In 1994, Le-Chen She served as the principal. In 1996, Chin-Chig Han served as the principal. In 1998, Ye-Chin Lin served as the principal. In 2001, Ting-I Tshi served as the principal.

=== Tzu-Chiang Junior High School ===
Tzu Chiang Junior High School is a Junior High School located in Zhongli District. The school zone covers the Zihciang Village, Huasyun Village, Singren Village, Jhongjheng Village, Jhongshan Village, Dusing Village, and such. Within the area, new communities are sprouting at the area behind the Neili train Station, and it also covers the Military dependents’ villages such as the Luguang No. 5 Residential Quarter, Jingjhong 1st Village and Zihlisincun Village. It is a popular area filled with prosperities with the businesses and industries.

=== Yung-An Junior High School ===
This school is located on Jhongshan W. Rd., Xinwu District.

==== History ====
Yung-An Junior High School is located in Yung-An Village and is 1.5 kilometers away from Yung-An Fishing Port. Most residents live on agriculture, fishing or tourism with simple lifestyles. The school was originally named Kan-Tou Cuo until Chih-Jou Chou, the chairman of Taiwan Province, renamed it to Yung-An. Because of the 9-year Compulsory Education Policy, the residents endeavoured to arrange a high school. 307 students initially shared the campus with Yung-An Elementary School until October 22, 1968. Yung-An Junior High School is getting more and more substantial thanks to the efforts from the previous presidents.

Chu-Fen Chang, the present president, took over the 12th president on August 1, 2005. Ms. Chang follows the belief of former presidents that “The functionality of Yung-An Junior High School is more important than its scale.” Not only the cultivation of the devotion to school and hometown but also the refinement of school atmosphere is what Ms. Chang leads the staff to run after.

== Bilingual education initiatives ==
In accordance with Taiwan's national "Bilingual 2030" policy Taoyuan City have actively transitioned toward integrating English-medium instruction (EMI) and Content and Language Integrated Learning (CLIL) models into their standard curriculum. Rather than teaching English strictly as an isolated academic subject, institutions across the municipality have integrated bilingual components into non-tested subjects such as arts, physical education, natural sciences, and life curriculum.

Historically, elementary schools in the region primarily utilized a mixed-language iformat combining Mandarin Chinese and English to build core conversational, game-based, and listening skills. Under the modern bilingual framework, primary schools utilize Mandarin for core instruction while embedding English contextually to expand students' functional communication abilities. However, schools in Taoyuan have faced implementation challenges uniform with the rest of Taiwan, including bridging student language proficiency gaps, securing specialized teaching materials, and navigating cultural preferences for exam-driven subjects.
