= Frank Wu =

Frank Wu may refer to:

- Frank Wu (artist), American science fiction and fantasy artist
- Frank Wu (journalist) (born 1945), Taiwanese journalist and politician
- Frank H. Wu, American legal scholar and academic administrator
