= Zhang Jinfu =

Zhang Jinfu may refer to:

- Zhang Jingfu (1914–2015), Chinese politician
- Chang Jin-fu (born 1948), Taiwanese politician
