= 2016 Kuomintang chairmanship by-election =

← 2015	26 March 2016	2017 →
- Turnout: 41.61% (▼14.73%)
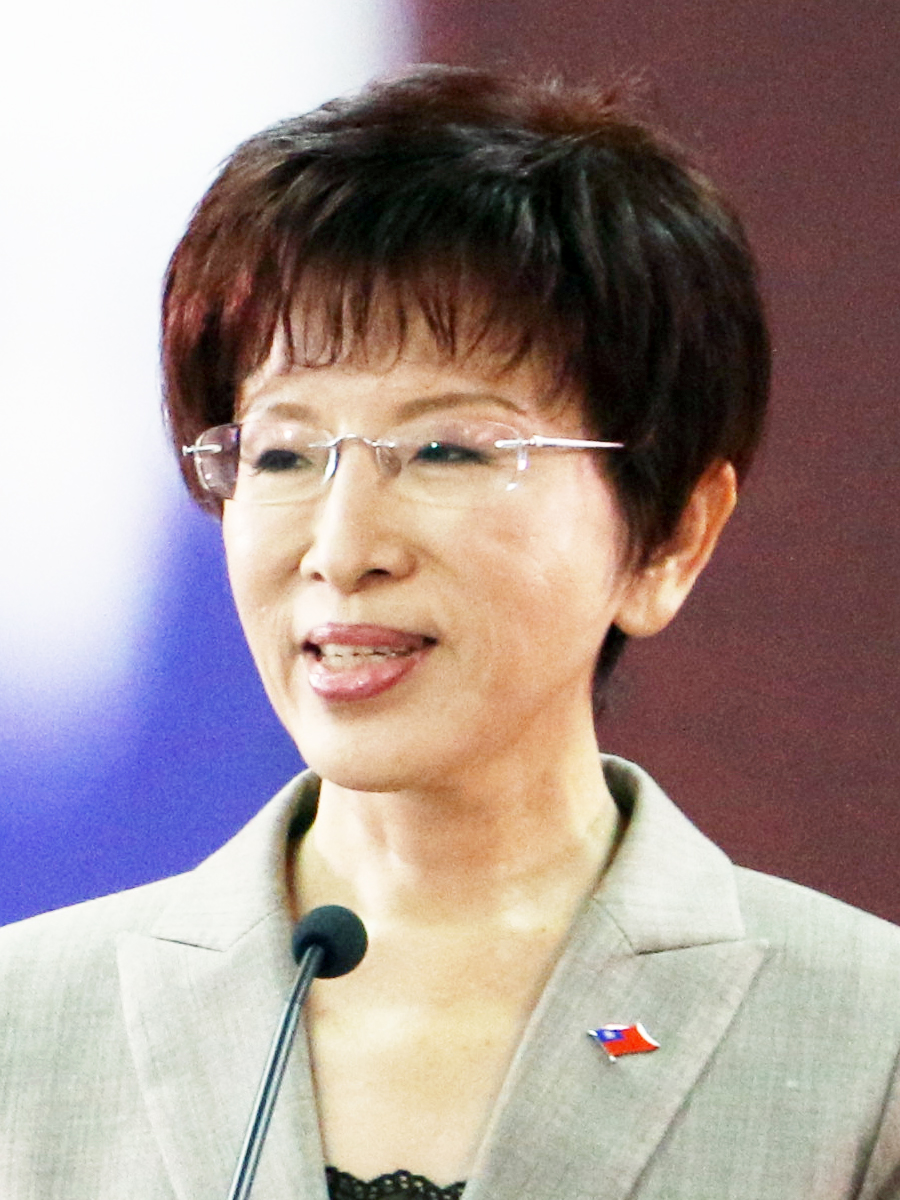

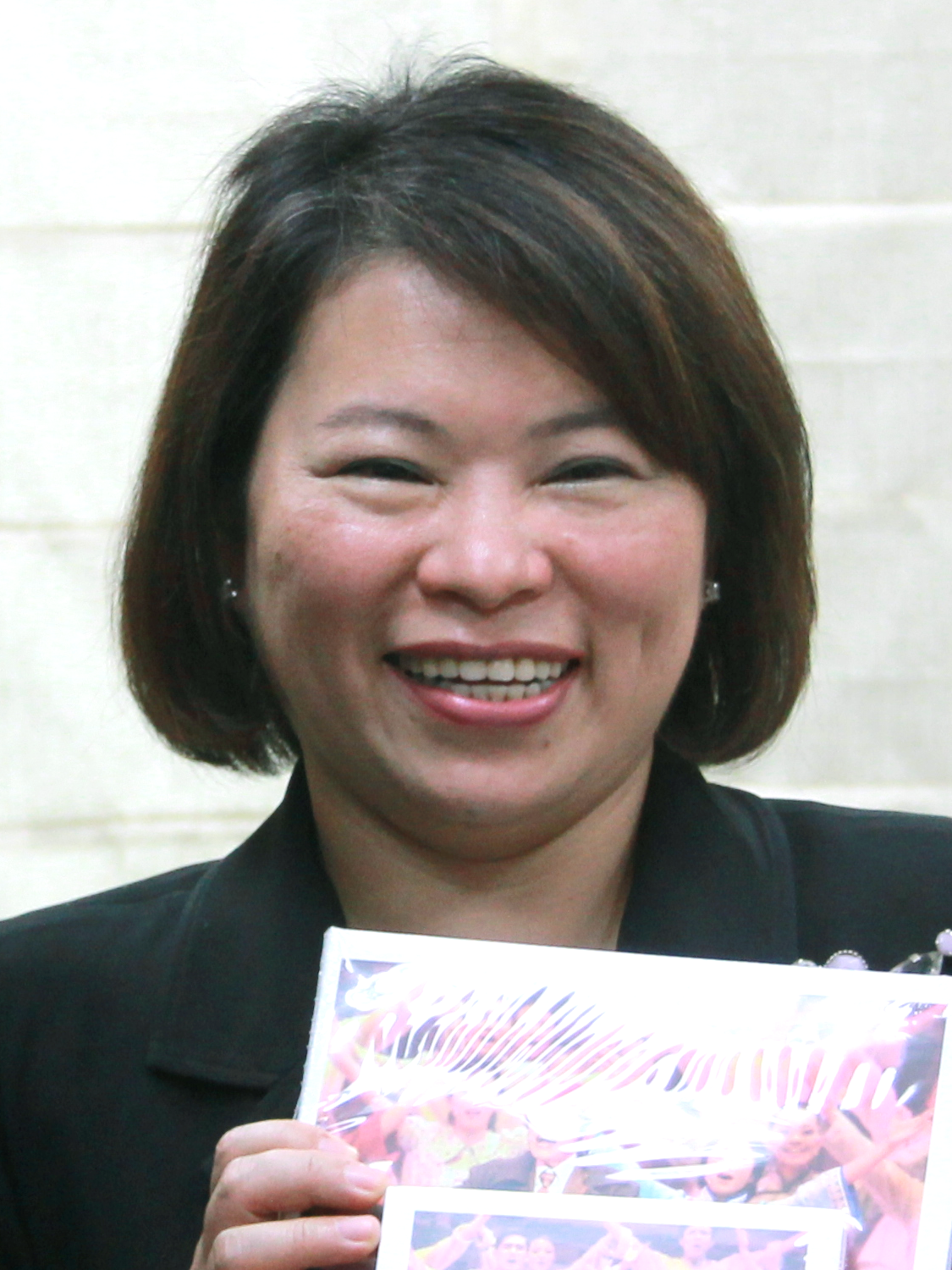

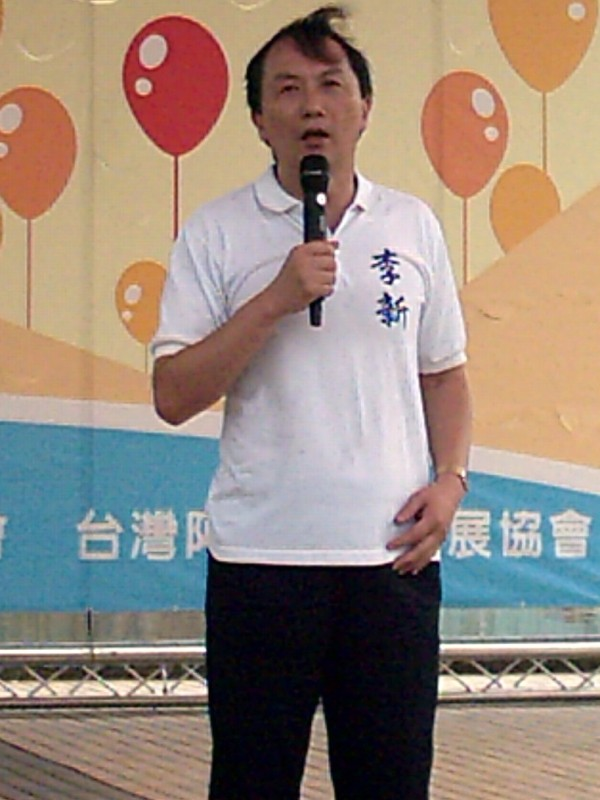

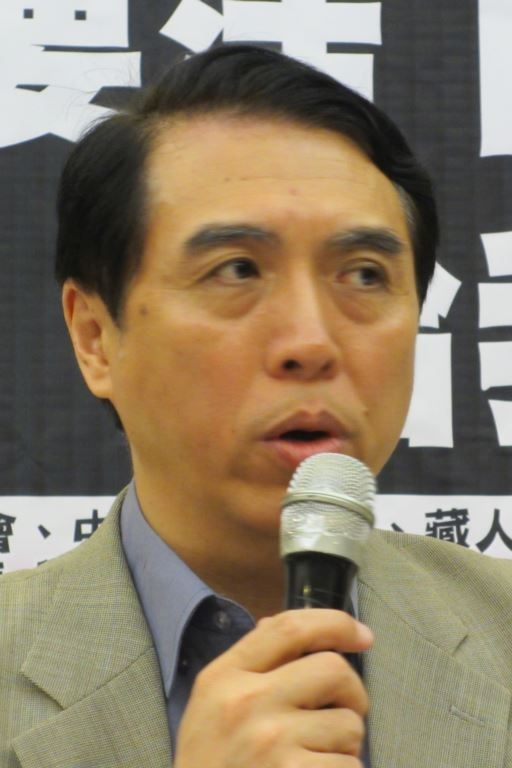
Nominee	Hung Hsiu-chu	Huang Min-hui
Popular vote	78,829	46,341
Percentage	56.16%	33.02%
Nominee	Lee Hsin	Apollo Chen
Popular vote	7,604	6,784
Percentage	5.42%	4.83%
- County level units won by Hung Hsiu-chu. County level units won by Huang Min-hui.
Chairman before election
Huang Min-hui (acting)
Elected Chairman
Hung Hsiu-chu

The 2016 Kuomintang chairmanship by-election (Chinese: 2016年中國國民黨主席補選) was held on 26 March 2016 in Taiwan. This was the seventh direct election of the party leader in Kuomintang history. All registered, due-paying KMT party members were eligible to vote.

== History ==
The party leadership by-election was called after Kuomintang presidential candidate Eric Chu lost the 2016 election to Democratic Progressive Party candidate Tsai Ing-wen. Chu, who had been elected as KMT leader a year prior, subsequently resigned his post. On 21 January, a day after Hung Hsiu-chu announced her candidacy, Hau Lung-pin declared his interest in the position. Apollo Chen, Chung Hsiao-ping, and Lee Hsin also joined the race, as did New Party chairman Yok Mu-ming, whom the KMT immediately declared ineligible.

The registration period for the election began on 26 January. Lee Hsin became the first to complete the process. Yok Mu-ming did not file his proposed candidacy, as he had been barred from doing so by the KMT the previous day. Central Advisory Committee member Chou Kai-lun filed the required documentation, but did not pay the fee, nullifying his candidacy. On 27 January, Apollo Chen, Chen Ming-yi, Hung Hsiu-chu, acting chair Huang Min-hui, and Lin Rong-te began registration. Hau Lung-pin dropped out, and Chung Hsiao-ping was rejected because he had not yet served on the party's Central Committee. On 29 January, Chen Ming-yi withdrew his candidacy.

== Election ==
To be considered eligible for the election itself, all candidates must have collected the signatures of three percent of the Kuomintang membership, a cutoff of 9,600 in 2016, by 21 February. Lin Rong-te dropped out of the election on 17 February, four days before the petition deadline. The four remaining candidates submitted petitions and registered for the election on 22 February. On 26 February, the party confirmed that every candidate had reached the signature threshold required to validate their candidacy. The election was held on 26 March 2016.

== Results ==
Hung Hsiu-chu won the election outright with 56.16% of the vote in the first round. Acting chair Huang Min-hui finished second at 33.02% while Taipei City councilor Lee Hsin and legislator Apollo Chen polled in the single digits with 5.42% and 4.83% of the vote, respectively. With the electoral victory Hung became the first elected chairwoman of the party since its establishment.

Turnout was 41.61% of 337,351 voters, the lowest turnout since the party began directly electing its leader in 2001.

Candidate	Party	Votes	%
Hung Hsiu-chu	Kuomintang	78,829	56.48
Huang Min-hui	Kuomintang	46,341	33.21
Lee Hsin	Kuomintang	7,604	5.45
Apollo Chen	Kuomintang	6,784	4.86
Total		139,558	100.00
Valid votes		139,558	99.43
Invalid/blank votes		800	0.57
Total votes		140,358	100.00
Registered voters/turnout		337,351	41.61
