= Chen Xuesheng =

Chen Xusheng may refer to:

- Chen Hsueh-sheng (born 1952), Taiwanese politician
- Chen Shei-saint (born 1957), or Apollo Chen, Taiwanese politician
