= Lu Ming-che =

Taiwanese politician

Lu Ming-che MLY
- 魯明哲
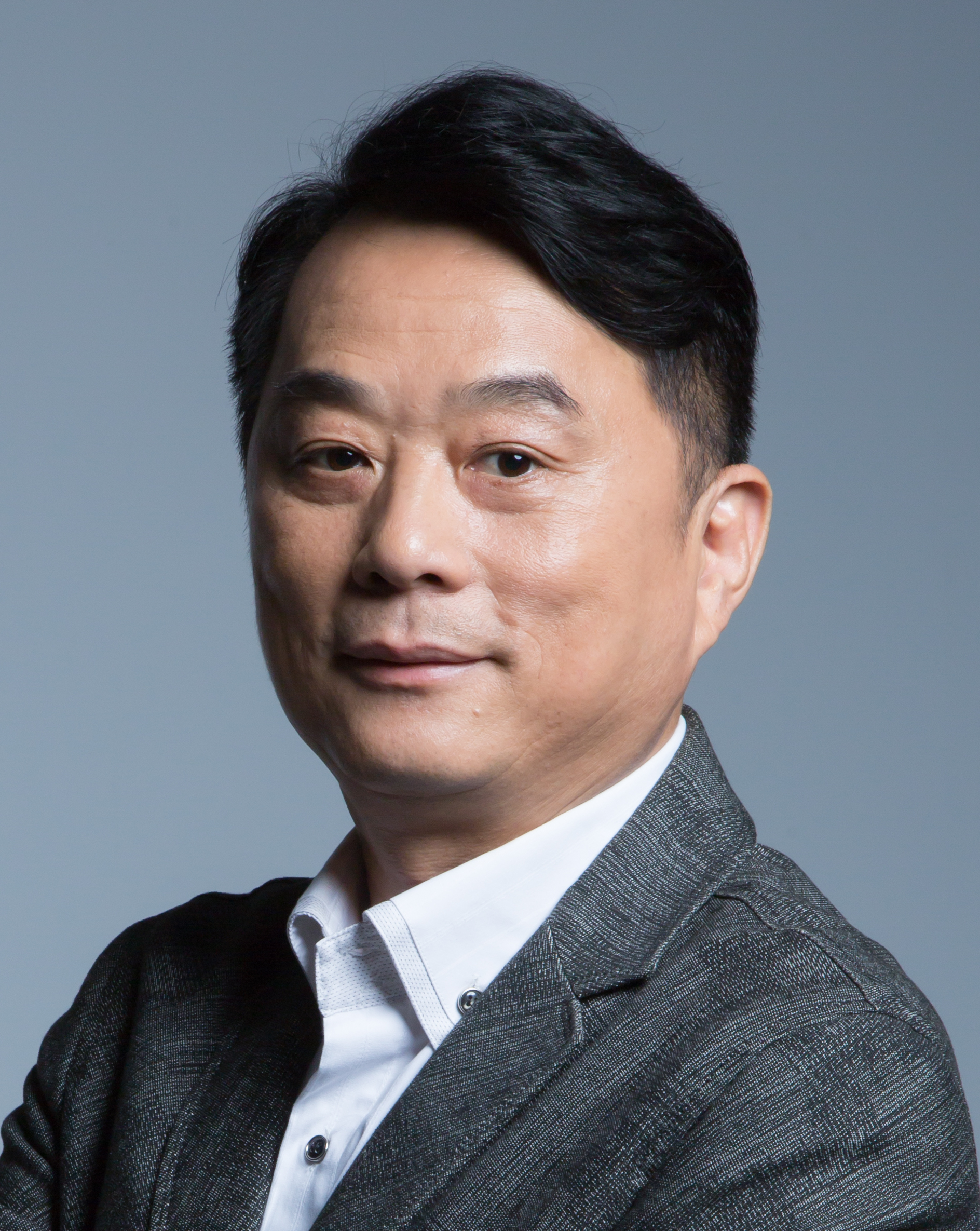
- Official portrait, 2019

Member of the Legislative Yuan
- Incumbent
- Assumed office 1 February 2020
- Preceded by: Apollo Chen
- Constituency: Taoyuan 3

Member of the Taoyuan City Council
- In office 25 December 2014 – 31 January 2020
- Constituency: Seventh precinct Zhongli District)

Mayor of Zhongli City
- In office 1 March 2010 – 24 December 2014
- Preceded by: Yeh Bu-liang
- Succeeded by: Lin Hsiang-mei (as head of Zhongli District)

Member of the Taoyuan County Council
- In office 1 March 2002 – 1 March 2010
- Constituency: Zhongli City

Member of the Zhongli City Council
- In office 1 March 1998 – 1 March 2002

Personal details
- Born: 4 December 1963 (age 62) Taipei, Taiwan
- Party: Kuomintang (since 2008); New Party (1998–2002); People First Party (2002–2008)
- Education: National Chengchi University (BBA); Yuan Ze University (MBA)

Lu Ming-che (Chinese: 魯明哲; pinyin: Lǔ Míngzhé; born 4 December 1963) is a Taiwanese politician. He has been a member of the Legislative Yuan representing Taoyuan City since 2020.

== Early life and education ==
Lu was raised in Taipei, Taiwan. As a child, he lived with his parents in a military dependents' village. His father, Lu Fang-san (魯鳳三), was an artillery officer during the Second Taiwan Strait Crisis.

Lu attended Taipei Municipal Chien Kuo High School, but dropped out to work as a delivery driver. He completed compulsory military service in the Republic of China Army, where he served as an army officer, and graduated from National Chengchi University with a bachelor's degree in business administration. He then earned a Master of Business Administration (M.B.A.) from Yuan Ze University.

== Political career ==
Lu was elected to a single term on the Zhongli City Council, serving from 1998 to 2002. He was subsequently elected to the Taoyuan County Council for two full terms, serving until 2010. Later that year, Lu won the Zhongli mayoral election. He remained mayor until 2014, when Taoyuan County became a special municipality, and the city of Zhongli became a district of Taoyuan City. Lu then served on the Taoyuan City Council until 2020. In 2018, he sought the Kuomintang nomination as candidate for the mayoralty of Taoyuan. Following a party primary, the KMT selected Apollo Chen as its mayoral candidate. He was elected to the Legislative Yuan from Taoyuan City Constituency III in January 2020, succeeding Chen in office. During his first term as a member of the Legislative Yuan, Lu served on the transportation committee and took an interest in the review of CTi News performed by the National Communications Commission. Lu garnered some support for a Taoyuan mayoral bid prior to the 2022 Taiwanese local elections. However, the Kuomintang nominated Chang San-cheng in a closed-door meeting of its Central Standing Committee in May 2022.
