= Chao Cheng-yu =

Taiwanese politician (born 1966)

Chao Cheng-yu MLY
- 趙正宇
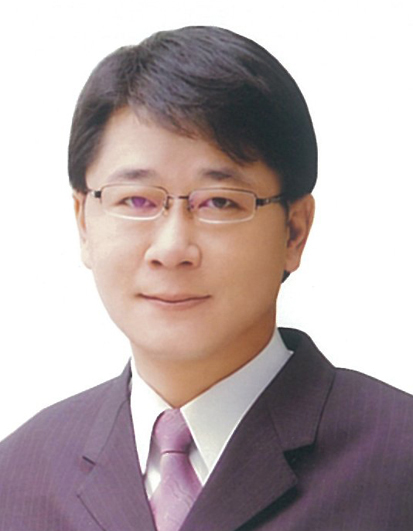
- Official portrait, 2016

Member of the Legislative Yuan
- Outgoing
- Assumed office 1 February 2016
- Preceded by: Sun Ta-chien
- Succeeded by: Chiu Ruo-hua
- Constituency: Taoyuan 6
- Majority: 76,278 (46.53%)

Taoyuan City Councillor
- In office 25 December 2014 – 31 January 2016
- Constituency: Ward 3

Personal details
- Born: 29 March 1966 (age 60) Bade, Taoyuan, Taiwan
- Party: Independent (since 2015)
- Other political affiliations: Kuomintang (1983–2014)
- Spouse: Wu Shu-hui
- Education: Republic of China Military Academy (BS); Ming Chuan University (MPA)

Chao Cheng-yu (Chinese: 趙正宇; pinyin: Zháo Zhèngyǔ; born 29 March 1966) is a Taiwanese politician who was a member of the Legislative Yuan for Taoyuan 6 from 2016 until 2024.

== Education ==
Chao graduated from the Republic of China Military Academy and then earned a Master of Public Affairs (M.P.A.) from Ming Chuan University.

== Career ==
Chao served three terms as a Member of Taoyuan County Council as a member of Kuomintang. He lost his primary in 2014 and subsequently became an independent. He ran for a seat in Ward 3, a five-member ward, for Taoyuan City Council and was elected with most votes.

He ran for a seat in the Legislative Yuan as an independent for Taoyuan 6 in the 2016 election with the endorsement of the Democratic Progressive Party (DPP). Though Chao is an independent, he caucuses with the DPP.

As a legislator, Chao has been involved in discussions about the Ministry of Transportation and Communications, general oversight of public transportation, and the National Communications Commission.

In the 2024 legislative election he lost his seat to Chiu Jo-Hua from the Kuomintang.

== Legal judgements ==
In 2020, Chao was implicated in collecting bribes of tens of millions of yuan from a pair of funeral businesses. The following investigation revealed that in 2018, after receiving a bribe, Chao pressured officials from the Construction and Planning Agency to rezone nearly 20,000 square meters of land in the Yangmingshan National Park. Investigators launched a search of the legislator's home to find NT$9.2 million in "bundles of cash". Investigators also photographed the Legislator's assistant Lin Chia-chi throwing a bag of money out of a car window that contained matching bills to the money found at Chao's home. The Taipei District Court ruled in July 2022 that Chen had was guilty of tax evasion, sentenced him six months imprisonment or a fine, and ordered to pay NT$60,000.

== Electoral record ==
=== Taoyuan city counciller, ward 3 ===
- Five seats up for election, 1 reserved for female candidate
- Eligible voters: 136,105
- Turnout (percentage): 87,424 (64.23%)
- Valid votes (percentage): 85,433 (97.72%)
- Invalid votes (percentage): 1,991 (2.28%)

List	Candidate	Sex	Party	Votes	%	Elected
1	Jhang Wun-yu	F	Independent	7,005	8.20%	
2	He Zheng-sun	M	Kuomintang	6,527	7.64%	
3	Lyu Shu-jhen	F	Kuomintang	7,117	8.33%	
4	Lyu Lin Siao-feng	F	Democratic Progressive Party	11,518	13.48%	
5	Jhong Siao-yan	M	Independent	962	1.13%	
6	Liu Mao-cyun	F	Kuomintang	8,068	9.44%	
7	Wang Guo-dong	M	Kuomintang	3,760	4.40%	
8	Lai Wei-jhe	M	Independent	768	0.90%	
9	Chao Cheng-yu	M	Independent	12,478	14.61%	
10	Cai Yong-fang	M	Democratic Progressive Party	12,221	14.30%	
11	Zheng Yin-fu	M	Independent	3,223	3.77%	
12	Peng Shao-kang	M	New Party	766	0.90%	
13	Lin Yu-jyuan	F	Independent	4,091	4.79%	
14	Chen Song-fu	M	Independent	6,929	8.11%	

=== 2016 Legislative Yuan election ===
- Eligible voters: 248,233
- Turnout (percentage): 167,257 (67.38%)
- Valid votes (percentage): 163,934 (98.01%)
- Invalid votes (percentage): 3,323 (1.99%)
- Incumbent is in bold

List	Candidate	Party	Votes	%	Elected
1	Zheng Jhen-yuan	Taiwan future party	2,700	1.65%	
2	Chao Cheng-yu	Independent	76,278	46.53%	
3	Lan Da-shan	Taiwan Independence Party	1,272	0.78%	
4	**Sun Ta-chien**	Kuomintang	75,510	46.06%	
5	Yang Jin-syuan	Independent	800	0.48%	
6	Lyun Dong-jie	Green-Social Democratic Union	7,374	4.50%	

=== 2020 Legislative Yuan election ===
- Eligible voters: 270,879
- Turnout (percentage): 201,745 (74.48%)
- Valid votes: 197,648
- Invalid votes: 4,097

List	Candidate	Party	Votes	%	Elected
1	Apollo Chen	Kuomintang	82,152	41.56%	
2	Chao Cheng-yu	Independent	115,496	58.44%	

=== 2024 Legislative Yuan election ===
- Eligible voters: 282,216
- Turnout (percentage): 203,630 (72.15%)
- Valid votes: 199,144
- Invalid votes: 4,486

List	Candidate	Party	Votes	%	Elected
1	Yeh Tang Yu	Independent	2,523	1.27%	
2	Chao Cheng-yu	Independent	76,346	38.35%	
3	Li Mu Yan	Taiwan People's Party	35,183	17.67%	
4	Chiu Jo-hua	Kuomintang	81,513	40.93%	
5	Wong Shau Ting	The People Union Party	890	0.45%	
6	Liu Ruei Chen	Fuo Kang Lian Meng Dang	2,689	1.35%	
