= Chen Ming-yi =

Taiwanese politician

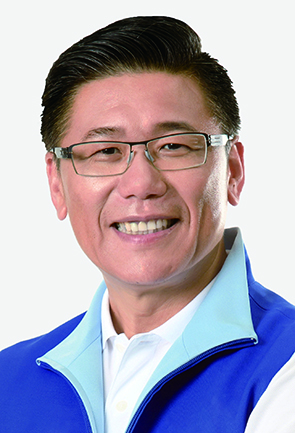
Chen Ming-Yi

Chen Ming-yi (Chinese: 陳明義) is a Taiwanese politician. He was a member of the Taipei County Council from 2006 to 2010, and served on the New Taipei City Council from 2010 to 2014, returning to office in 2016. He is also a member of the Kuomintang’s Central Standing Committee. It was reported that he would participate in the 2014 New Taipei mayoral election, however, the Kuomintang eventually chose Eric Chu as their mayoral candidate.

In the 2014 local elections, Chen failed to get re-elected as city councilor. He registered for the 2016 Kuomintang chairmanship election on January 27, but dropped his bid for the leadership position two days later.
