= 2015 Kuomintang chairmanship by-election =

2015 by-election in Taiwan

- 17 January 2015
- Turnout: 56.34%
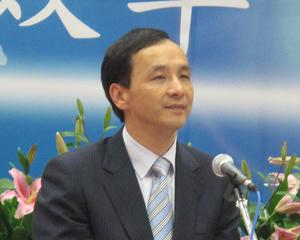
Nominee	Eric Chu
Popular vote	196,065
Percentage	100%
Chairman before election
Wu Den-yih (acting)
Elected Chairman
Eric Chu

The 2015 Kuomintang chairmanship by-election (Chinese: 2015年中國國民黨主席補選) was held on 17 January 2015 in Taiwan. This was the sixth direct election of the chairman in the Kuomintang history. All registered, due-paying KMT party members were eligible to vote.

== History ==
The election was called after Ma Ying-jeou resigned from the Kuomintang chairmanship to take responsibility for the party's heavy losses during the local elections held on 29 November 2014. Six KMT members, among them Clara Chou and Lee Hsin, attempted to register for the election, but five were rejected. Eric Chu, who had just been reelected Mayor of New Taipei in the November elections, was the only officially confirmed candidate.

== Result ==
Chu garnered 99.61% of all votes, beating the previous record in 2001.

Candidate	Party	Votes	%
Eric Chu	Kuomintang	196,065	100.00
Total		196,065	100.00
Valid votes		196,065	99.61
Invalid/blank votes		765	0.39
Total votes		196,830	100.00
Registered voters/turnout		349,374	56.34
Source: Apple Daily

== Reactions ==
- Democratic Progressive Party - Chairperson Tsai Ing-wen sent congratulatory flowers and a message to KMT headquarters after the polls closed. The message read, in part, "heavy responsibilities, long road ahead."
- General Secretary of the Chinese Communist Party Xi Jinping congratulated Chu immediately after the election. He expressed that the two sides of the Taiwan Strait could continue adhering the 1992 Consensus and oppose Taiwan independence to push for the peaceful development of Cross-Strait relations.

== See also ==
- Elections in the Republic of China
- List of leaders of the Kuomintang
