= Yong'an Fishing Port =

Port in Xinwu, Taoyuan City, Taiwan

Yong'an Fishing Port 永安漁港
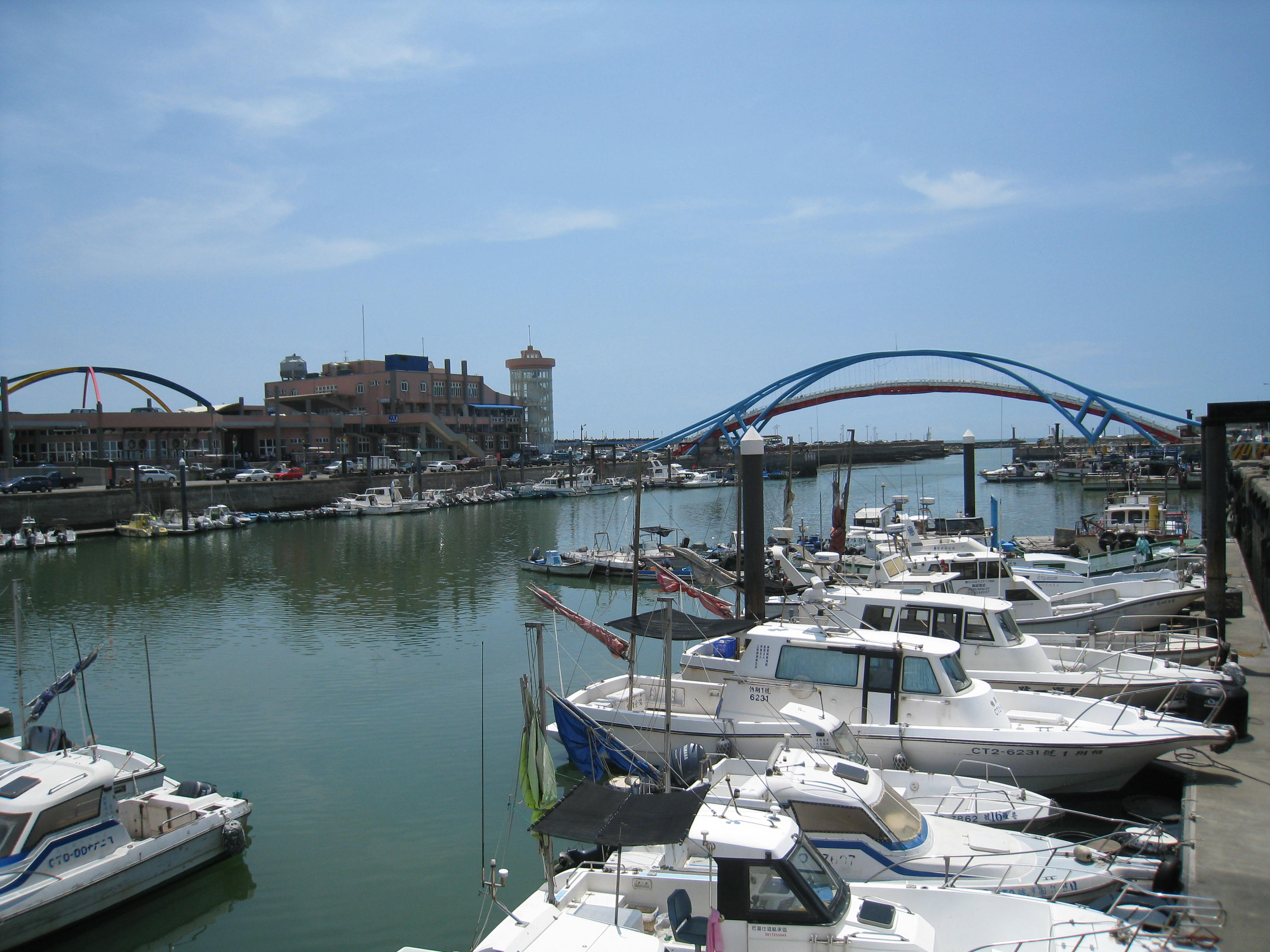
- Interactive map of Yong'an Fishing Port 永安漁港
- Location within Taiwan

Location
- Location: Xinwu, Taoyuan City, Taiwan
- Coordinates: 24°59′23.2″N 121°00′41.3″E

Details
- Type of Harbor: fishing port

The Yong'an Fishing Port (traditional Chinese: 永安漁港; simplified Chinese: 永安渔港; pinyin: Yǒng'ān Yúgǎng), formerly known as Kantouwu Port, is a fishing port in Xinwu District, Taoyuan City, Taiwan.

== Architecture ==
The port is located at the estuary of Shezu Creek. It features fish market designed with a shape of a lobster and the Yongan Seaview Bridge.

== Transportation ==
The port is accessible by bus from Zhongli Station of Taiwan Railway.

== See also ==
- Port of Taichung
