= Yung-Feng High School =

School in Taoyuan, Taiwan

Coordinates: 24°58′31.66″N 121°16′10.21″E

Taoyuan Municipal Yung-Feng High School

Location
- No.609, Yongfong Rd., Bade Dist., Taoyuan City 334, Taiwan

Information
- Type: A High School Established by Taoyuan City with Junior High School Division
- Established: A.D. 1999
- Principal: Dr. LIN, YU-FONG
- Staff: 24 People
- Faculty: 168 People
- Grades: Junior High School Division:Study 3 Years to Graduation Senior High School Division:Study 3 Years to Graduation
- Mascot: Buffalo
- Quantity: Junior High School Division:39 Classes Senior High School Division:32 Classes, Still Increasing, Contain 3 Sports Specialty Classes
- Area of This School: 3.79 Hectare
- School's Location: Close to Taoyuan City
- Website: http://www.yfms.tyc.edu.tw/

The Yung-Feng Hig'h School' (Chinese: 桃園市立永豐高級中學) is a high school in Bade District, Taoyuan City, Taiwan.

== The History of Yung-Feng High School ==
=== Evolution ===
- A.D. 1995:Ministry of Education planning to establish a "Complete School."
- A.D. 1999:"Taoyuan Municipal Yung-Feng High School" was set up. Started to enroll the first Junior High School students and Senior High School students in September.
- A.D. 2001:Ministry of Education has stopped the "Complete School" program, the school was ordered to change into "Taoyuan Municipal Yung-Feng High School founded by Taoyuan County."
- A.D. 2014:Due to Taoyuan County has been promoted to a special municipal city, the name changed into "Taoyuan Municipal Yung-Feng High School founded by Taoyuan City."

=== Previous Principals ===
Term	Name	Working Time
1st	Mr. ZENG, YU-LIN	August, 1999～July, 2003
2nd	Mr. SIE, JIN-YUN	August, 2003～July, 2009
3rd	Ms. HAN, JING-JYU	August, 2009～July, 2013
4th	Mr. LIN, YU-FONG	August, 2013～Until Now

== Transportation ==
The school is accessible within walking distance east of Neili Station of Taiwan Railway.

== See also ==
- Education in Taiwan
