= Cheng Wen-tsan =

Vice Premier of Taiwan (ROC) from 2023 to 2024

- 鄭文燦
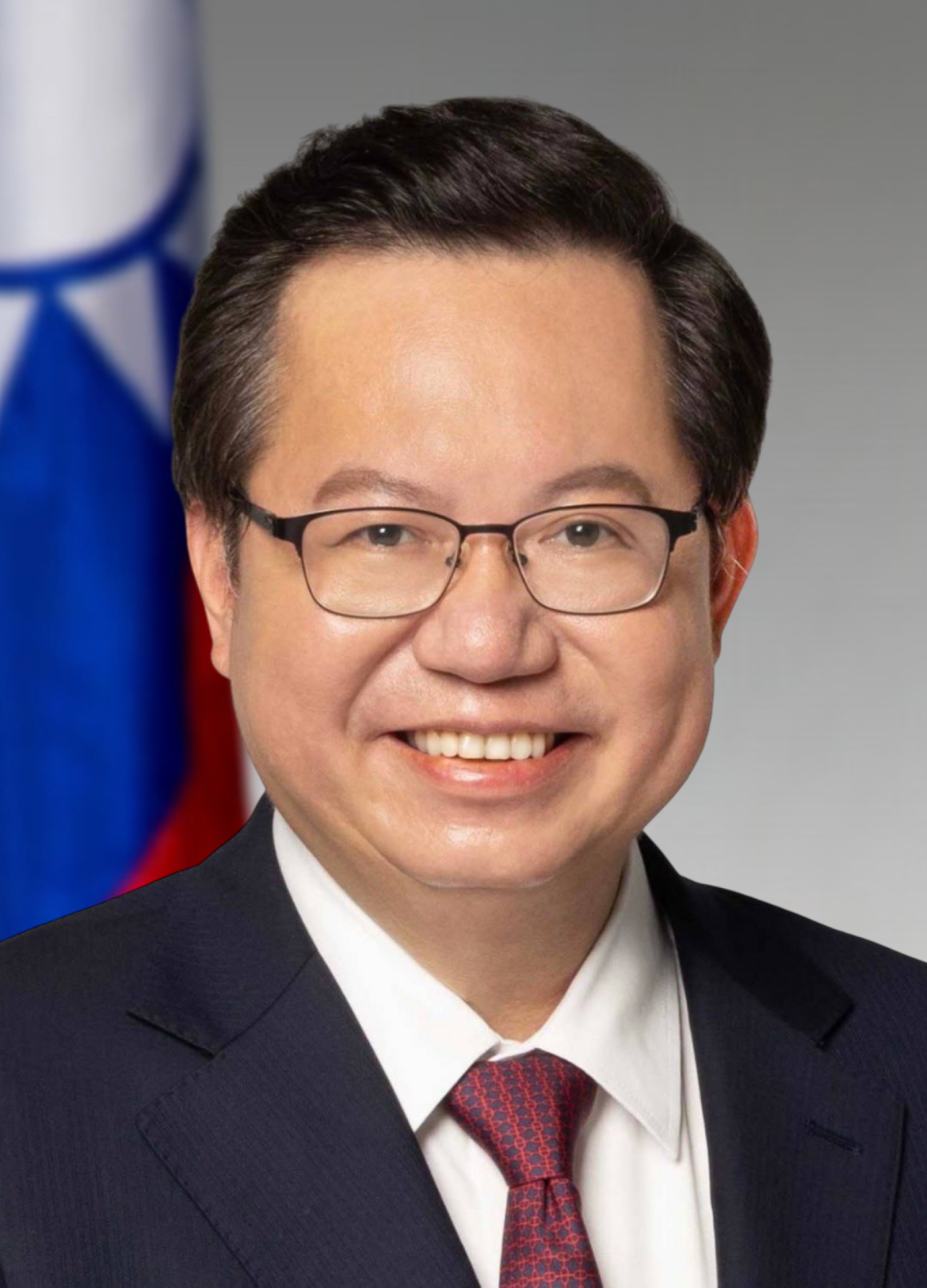
- Official portrait, 2023

36th Vice Premier of Taiwan
- In office 31 January 2023 – 20 May 2024
- Premier: Chen Chien-jen
- Preceded by: Shen Jong-chin
- Succeeded by: Cheng Li-chun

1st Mayor of Taoyuan
- In office 25 December 2014 – 25 December 2022
- Preceded by: Position established John Wu (as Magistrate of Taoyuan)
- Succeeded by: Chang San-cheng
Additional positions
9th Chairperson of the Straits Exchange Foundation
In office 7 June 2024 – 7 July 2024
President	Lai Ching-te
Deputy	Luo Wen-jia; Rock Hsu
Preceded by	David Lee
Succeeded by	Rock Hsu (acting); Frank Wu
Head of Taoyuan Chapter of the Democratic Progressive Party
In office 25 December 2009 – 5 July 2014
Chairperson	See list: Tsai Ing-wen Chen Chu Su Tseng-chang Tsai Ing-wen
Preceded by	Chen Chih-mou
Succeeded by	Chen Lai Su-mei
23rd Minister of the Government Information Office
In office 25 January 2006 – 20 April 2007
Premier	Su Tseng-chang
Preceded by	Pasuya Yao
Succeeded by	Yi Rong-zong (acting); Shieh Jhy-wey

Personal details
- Born: 6 July 1967 (age 59) Bade, Taoyuan County, Taiwan (now Bade District, Taoyuan City)
- Party: Democratic Progressive Party
- Education: National Taiwan University (BA)

Cheng Wen-tsan (Chinese: 鄭文燦; pinyin: Zhèng Wéncàn; Wade–Giles: Chêng^{4} Wên^{2}-tsʻan^{4}; born 6 July 1967) is a Taiwanese politician who served as the vice premier of the Republic of China (Taiwan) from 2023 to 2024 and chairman of the Straits Exchange Foundation briefly in 2024. A member of the Democratic Progressive Party (DPP), he was the first mayor of the newly established Taoyuan special municipality, serving from 2014 to 2022.

== Early life and education ==
Born in present-day Bade District, Taoyuan City, Cheng grew up with 6 siblings and took an after-school job in neighboring Yingge. His father was a civil servant in the Taoyuan government.

After attending Taipei Municipal Chien Kuo High School, Cheng graduated from National Taiwan University (NTU) with a bachelor's degree in sociology and a master's degree in national development. However, his master's degree was later rescinded due to plagiarism allegations. During his time at NTU, he was founding president of NTU Student Press (臺大學生報社) and was elected vice president of the student association.

== Entry into politics ==
Cheng played a key role in the Wild Lily student movement in 1990.

In 1998, Cheng was elected into the Taoyuan County legislature at the age of 30, receiving the most votes out of all candidates.

In the early 2000s, Cheng worked for the DPP's Information and Culture Department. From January 2006 to April 2007, he served as minister of the Government Information Office as part of the first cabinet led by Su Tseng-chang. Cheng resigned from the GIO in April 2007, after vice premier Tsai Ing-wen concluded an investigation into Cheng's influence during a sale of shares in a media company.

Cheng joined the 2009 Taoyuan County magistrate election under the DPP banner on 5 December 2009. However, he lost to Kuomintang opponent John Wu.

== Mayor of Taoyuan City (2014–2022) ==
Cheng was elected mayor of Taoyuan City after winning the 2014 mayoral election held on 29 November 2014, defeating incumbent Kuomintang (KMT) magistrate John Wu, to whom Cheng lost in 2009. Following the election, Cheng appointed Chiu Tai-san and Wang Ming-teh as deputy mayors of Taoyuan.

In April 2017, Cheng's rib was fractured after he was attacked by protesters outside Legislative Yuan who opposed a pension system reform bill. Cheng did not press charges against the perpetrator citing his belief in democratic politics.

In the 2018 elections, Cheng defeated KMT contender Apollo Chen and three independent candidates to win a second term as mayor of Taoyuan.

In October 2022, New Party city council candidate publicly alleged that Cheng had committed plagiarism or hired a ghostwriter to write his master's thesis at NTU. After an investigation by the university, Cheng's thesis was revoked and master's degree rescinded.

== Post-mayoralty career ==
Cheng was elected to chair the Chinese Taipei Football Association in October 2022, following the resignation of Chiou I-jen in August of that year.

=== Vice-premiership (2023–2024) ===
In January 2023, Premier Chen Chien-jen appointed Cheng as vice premier as part of his new cabinet.

== Bribery allegations ==
In July 2024, Taiwanese authorities announced an investigation into Cheng on suspicion of bribery. Cheng stepped down as chairman of the Straits Exchange Foundation on 7 July, with Rock Hsu succeeding Cheng in an acting capacity.

After a series of bail hearings, Cheng was detained for two months without visitation rights for a period of two months on July 12. The Democratic Progressive Party, of which Cheng is a member, suspended him from holding public office for three years. The Taoyuan District Prosecutors' Office indicted Cheng on charges of corruption on 27 August 2024. He was released on bail of NT$28 million the following day.

== Honors ==
- 2024 Order of Brilliant Star with Special Grand Cordon

== Notes ==
Political offices
Preceded by John Wu as Magistrate of Taoyuan County	Mayor of Taoyuan; 2014–2022	Succeeded by Chang San-cheng
Preceded by Shen Jong-chin	Vice Premier of the Republic of China; 2023–2024	Succeeded by Cheng Li-chun
