= Kuo Jung-tsung =

Taiwanese politician (born 1954)

- 郭榮宗
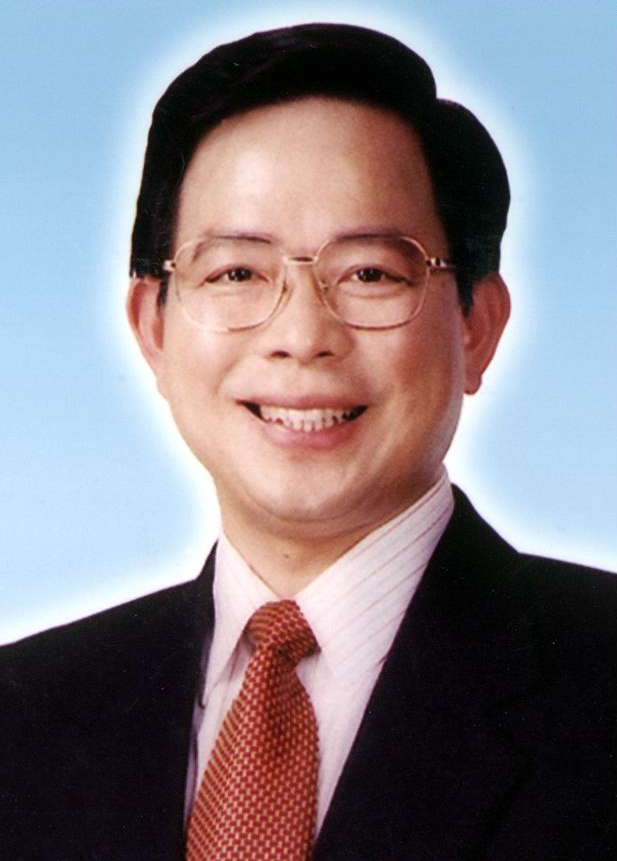

Member of the Taoyuan City Council
- In office 25 December 2014 – 24 August 2015
- Succeeded by: Wu Tsung-hsien
- Constituency: District 2 (Guanyin)

Member of the Legislative Yuan
- In office 18 January 2010 – 31 January 2012
- Preceded by: Liao Cheng-ching
- Succeeded by: Liao Cheng-ching
- Constituency: Taoyuan County 2
- In office 1 February 2002 – 31 January 2008
- Preceded by: multi-member district
- Succeeded by: Liao Cheng-ching
- Constituency: Taoyuan County

Mayor of Guanyin
- In office 1 March 1994 – 31 January 2002
- Preceded by: Lee Wen-kuei
- Succeeded by: Chang Yung-huei

Personal details
- Born: 23 August 1954 (age 71) Dayuan, Taoyuan County, Taiwan
- Party: Democratic Progressive Party
- Spouse: Tsai Mei-ying
- Education: National Taiwan Ocean University (BA)

Kuo Jung-tsung (Chinese: 郭榮宗; born 23 August 1954) is a Taiwanese politician.

== Education and early career ==
Kuo graduated from the National Chung-Li Senior High School and National Taiwan Ocean University. He was a lecturer at his alma mater and Kainan University.

== Political career ==
Prior to winning his first Legislative Yuan term in 2001, Kuo served two terms as mayor of Guanyin, Taoyuan, from 1994 to 2002. He won reelection to the Legislative Yuan in 2004. In November 2003, Kuo Jung-tsung, Kuo Wen-cheng, and Hsieh Ming-yuan fought Chung Shao-ho on the floor of the Legislative Yuan. Chung had pulled down a protest sign held by another Democratic Progressive Party lawmaker, who was opposing the scheduling of a defense committee meeting on the same day as a gathering of the general legislature. During his first legislative term, Kuo Jung-tsung also commented on the potential pardoning of expelled DPP members, and the possibility of leaking classified military information in a small-scale exercise observed by president Chen Shui-bian. In his second term, Kuo expressed opposition to the legalization of gambling and to investment in China by the Taiwanese technology industry.

Kuo lost reelection in 2008 to Kuomintang legislative candidate Liao Cheng-ching. Kuo ran in the by-election for Taoyuan County's 2nd district scheduled after Liao's conviction on vote-buying charges, and defeated Chen Li-ling. Kuo was sworn into office on 18 January 2010, and stepped down at the end of his term on 31 January 2012. During the 2010 New Taipei City mayoral election, a document signed by Kuo and Huang Jen-shu became a topic of discussion. The document claimed that, Eric Chu, during his tenure as Taoyuan County Magistrate, had ended the county government's subsidies for agriculture and the elderly. In August 2010, Kuo opposed the nomination of Su Yeong-chin to the post of vice president of the Judicial Yuan, believing that judicial independence would be reduced, as both Su Yeong-chin and his brother Su Chi were close to Ma Ying-jeou. In March 2011, Kuo and fellow legislator Lo Shu-lei opined that Chunghwa Telecom did not need to charge fees for long-distance phone service, due to the small geographic size of Taiwan. That same month, Kuo also asked premier Wu Den-yih about his position on nuclear power. An analysis by Citizen’s Congress Watch undertaken after the Eighth Legislative Yuan had ended revealed that Kuo had never spoken in any legislative committee for which he held membership.

In 2013, Kuo supported Annette Lu's call to impeach Ma Ying-jeou. The following year, Kuo visited Su Tseng-chang after Su announced that he would not run for reelection as Democratic Progressive Party chair or as the party's Taoyuan mayoral candidate. In November 2014, Kuo ran in the local elections. He was elected to the Taoyuan City Council alongside his niece and former Legislative Yuan aide, Kuo Li-hua. Kuo Jung-tsung resigned the council seat in August 2015, before an appeal to the Taiwan High Court regarding violations of electoral law was heard. The DPP chose to back the candidacy of Kuo's son Kuo Yu-hsin over his wife, Kuo Tsai Mei-ying, a former member of the Taoyuan County Council. Kuo Yu-hsin lost the by-election to independent candidate Wu Tsung-hsien.
