= Xinwu Rice Story House =

Gallery in Xinwu, Taoyuan City, Taiwan

- 新屋稻米故事馆
- Interactive map of the Xinwu Rice Story House area

General information
- Architectural style: former warehouse
- Location: Xinwu, Taoyuan City, Taiwan
- Coordinates: 24°58′19.9″N 121°06′28.9″E
- Completed: 1939
- Opened: 2007

The Xinwu Rice Story House (traditional Chinese: 新屋稻米故事館; simplified Chinese: 新屋稻米故事馆; pinyin: Xīnwū Dàomǐ Gùshì Guǎn) is a gallery in Xinwu District, Taoyuan City, Taiwan.

== History ==
The gallery was originally part of seven warehouses and processing plants built by the Japanese government in 1939 to store rice harvested from around the area. Restoration work of the building completed in November 2006 and it was opened in 2007 by Hakka Affairs Council and Taoyuan County Government.

== Architecture ==
The building was built with bricks with walls made of adobe and rice hulls covered with mortar. There is a measurement mark indicating the rice volume stored inside the warehouse. The roofs use Japanese tiles and decorated with animal pictures.

== See also ==
- List of tourist attractions in Taiwan
