= Lee Hsin =

Taiwanese politician (1953–2017)

- 李新
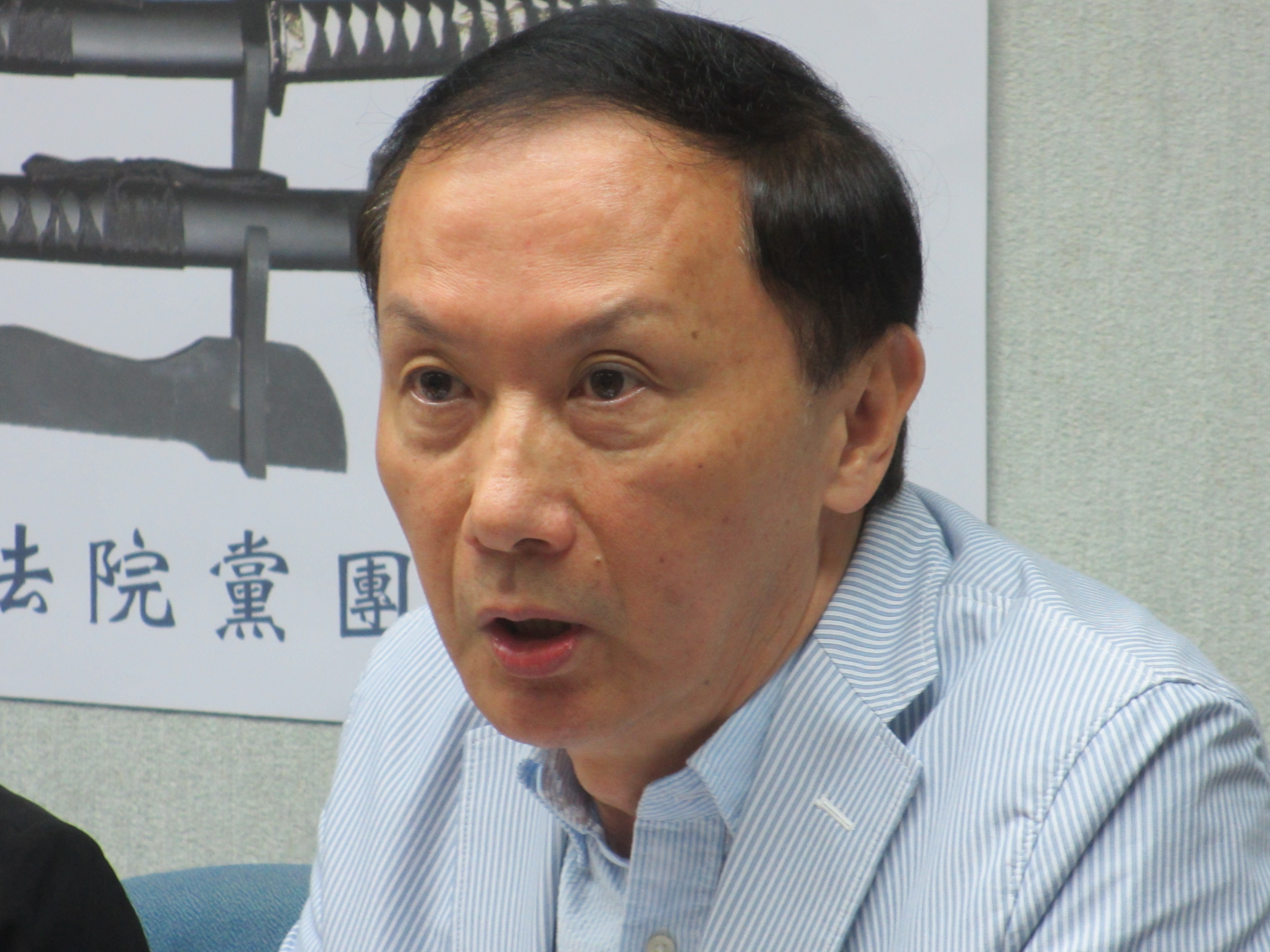
- Lee in August 2015

Member of the Taipei City Council
- In office 25 December 1998 – 28 September 2017
- Constituency: Taipei 6th (Da-an District & Wenshan)

9th Deputy Speaker of Taipei City Council
- In office 25 December 2002 – 24 December 2006
- Preceded by: Alex Fai
- Succeeded by: Chen Jinxiang

Member of the National Assembly
- In office 1996–1998

Personal details
- Born: 16 July 1953 Taipei County, Taiwan
- Died: 28 September 2017 (aged 64) Daan District, Taipei City, Taiwan
- Party: New Party (~2001); People First Party (2001~2008); Kuomintang (2008 ~ )
- Education: National Chung Hsing University (LLB); National Chengchi University; National Taiwan University (MA)

Lee Hsin (Chinese: 李新; 16 July 1953 – 28 September 2017) was a Taiwanese politician who served on the Taipei City Council from 1998 until his death in 2017. He could speak fluent Mandarin Chinese and Hokkien.

== Political career ==
In 1993, he followed Yok Mu-ming from the Kuomintang to the New Party. In 1996, Lee was elected to the National Assembly. Lee joined the 2006 campaign led by Shih Ming-teh which attempted to force the resignation of President Chen Shui-bian. In 2008, he rejoined to the Kuomintang.

In 2015, Lee expressed interest in running for the Kuomintang chairmanship, but his candidacy, and that of four others, was rejected.

=== 2016 KMT chairmanship election ===
The next year, he launched another bid for the party leadership, finishing third in a field of four candidates with 7,604 votes.

2016 Kuomintang chairmanship election
No.	Candidate	Party	Votes	Percentage	Result
1	Hung Hsiu-chu	Kuomintang	78,829	56.16%	
2	Huang Min-hui	Kuomintang	46,341	33.02%	
3	Lee Hsin	Kuomintang	7,604	5.42%	
4	Apollo Chen	Kuomintang	6,784	4.83%	
Total votes			337,351		
Turnout			41.61%		

He was a member of both the New Party and People First Party, and later joined the Kuomintang.

== Personal life ==
=== Death ===
On 28 September 2017, Lee died from jumping out of his apartment building in Daan District, Taipei City, Taiwan. He was 64.
