= Taoyuan City Constituency 2 =

Constituency of the Legislative Yuan of Taiwan

- Single-member constituency for the Legislative Yuan
- District(s): Dayuan, Guanyin, Xinwu, & Yangmei

Current constituency
- Created: 2008
- Member(s): Liao Cheng-ching (2008–2010); Kuo Jung-tsung (2010–2012); Liao Cheng-ching (2012–2016); Chen Lai Su-mei (2016–2020); Huang Shih-Chieh (2020–)

Taoyuan City Constituency 2 (Chinese: 桃園市第二選舉區; pinyin: Táoyuán Shì Dì-èr Xuǎnjǔ Qū) includes districts along most of the coast of Taoyuan City. The district was formerly known as Taoyuan County Constituency 2 (2008-2014) and was created in 2008, when all local constituencies of the Legislative Yuan were reorganized to become single-member districts.

== Current district ==
- Dayuan
- Guanyin
- Xinwu
- Yangmei

== Legislators ==
Representative	Party	Dates	Notes
Liao Cheng-ching	Kuomintang	2008–2010	
Kuo Jung-tsung	Democratic Progressive Party	2010–2012	
Liao Cheng-ching	Kuomintang	2012–2016	
Chen Lai Su-mei	Democratic Progressive Party	2016–2020	
Huang Shih-Chieh	Democratic Progressive Party	2020–2024	
Tu Chuan-Chi	Kuomintang	2024–	Incumbent

== Election results ==
=== 2016 ===
Legislative Election 2016: Taoyuan City Constituency 2
Party	Candidate	Votes	%	±%
Democratic Progressive	Chen Lai Su-mei	89,792	50.17	+0.38
Kuomintang	Liao Cheng-ching	76,473	42.73	–7.48
NPP	Zhang Kangyi	8,062	4.50	+4.50
Trees	Chen Peiyu	3,270	1.83	+1.83
Independent	Huang Weichun	757	0.42	+0.42
Others	Wu Zhentuo	634	0.35	+0.35
Majority		13,319	7.44	
Total valid votes		178,988	98.31	
Rejected ballots		3,068	1.69	
Democratic Progressive gain from Kuomintang		Swing	+7.87	
Turnout		182,056	67.11	–7.51
Registered electors		271,280		

=== 2024 ===
Legislative Election 2024: Taoyuan City Constituency 2
Party	Candidate	Votes	%	±%
Kuomintang	Tu Chuan-Chi	103,697	48.19	
Democratic Progressive	Huang Shih-Chieh	102,468	47.61	
Independent	Wang Si Min	7,127	3.31	
Chinese Unification Promotion Party	Chen Chih Hao	1,912	0.89	
Majority		1,229	0.57	
Total valid votes		215,204		
Kuomintang gain from Democratic Progressive		Swing		
