= Frank Wu (journalist) =

Taiwanese journalist (born 1945)

Wu Feng-shan
- 吳豐山
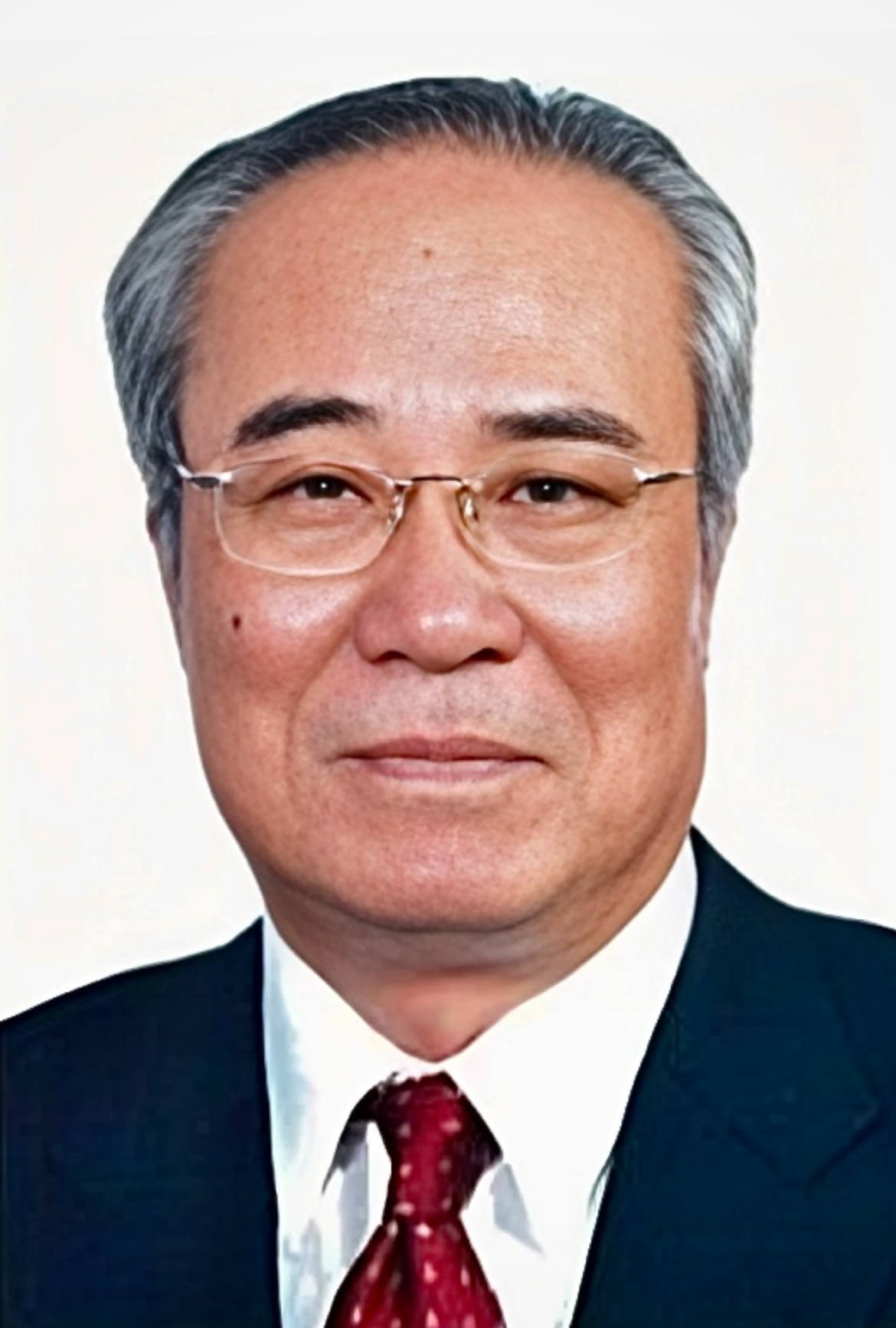
- Official portrait, 2014

10th Chairperson of the Straits Exchange Foundation
- In office 4 November 2024 – 31 December 2025
- President: Lai Ching-te
- Preceded by: Cheng Wen-tsan; Rock Hsu (acting)
- Succeeded by: Su Jia-chyuan

Minister without Portfolio
- In office 16 January 2006 – 21 May 2007
- Premier: Su Tseng-chang

Member of the Control Yuan
- In office 1 August 2008 – 31 July 2014
- Nominated by: Ma Ying-jeou
- President: Wang Chien-shien

Member of the National Assembly
- In office: 1987–1993; 1973–1981

Personal details
- Born: 24 January 1945 (age 80) Hokumon, Tainan Prefecture, Taiwan, Empire of Japan (today Beimen, Tainan, Taiwan)
- Party: Independent
- Education: National Chengchi University (BA)

Wu Feng-shan (Chinese: 吳豐山; born 24 January 1945), also known by his English name Frank Wu, is a Taiwanese journalist and politician. Wu worked for the Independence Evening Post between 1968 and 1994, then led the Public Television Service from 1998 to 2004. He was twice elected to the National Assembly and was a member of the Central Election Commission before serving as a minister without portfolio within the Executive Yuan from 2006 to 2007. Wu sat on the Control Yuan from 2008 to 2014, and was named chairman of the Straits Exchange Foundation in 2024.

== Media career ==
Wu worked for the Independence Evening Post from 1968 to 1994, serving successively as chief editor, then president, of the publication. During his tenure with the paper, Wu helped arrange the 1982 visit of Aleksander Solzhenitsyn to Taiwan. Shortly after the end of martial law in Taiwan in 1987, Wu sent Hsu Lu and Lee Yung-te to China. The pair became the first Taiwanese journalists to visit China. Between 1998 and 2004, Wu chaired the Public Television Service, and was succeeded by legal scholar Louis Chen. During the 2004 Taiwanese presidential election, Wu was the moderator for a series of debates between candidates Chen Shui-bian and Lien Chan. These were the first presidential debates in Taiwanese history in which all candidates agreed to participate. During the first free and direct election for president in 1996, incumbent Lee Teng-hui did not partake, and, in 2000, the field of candidates could not agree to debate terms, resulting in a televised series of policy presentations for each set of running mates.

== Political career ==
=== National Assembly and Executive Yuan ===
Wu served on the National Assembly from 1973 to 1981, and 1987 to 1993. In 2000, Wu proposed the "three acknowledgements" and "four suggestions" while he was a member of a task force convened to reach a consensus on the One-China policy. Wu was named to a second task force in 2004, convened to advise on the peaceful development of cross-strait relations. Additionally, Wu served on the Central Election Commission during the 2004 election cycle, and resigned the position in April of that year. He then joined the first cabinet led by Su Tseng-chang as a minister without portfolio.

=== Control Yuan ===
In 2008, Wu relinquished an Australian visa to accept a nomination to the Control Yuan. While serving on the Control Yuan, Wu led investigations into the construction of an airstrip on Taiping Island, a development project near the Zhaoping railway station, and the selection of Public Television Service board members. He supported a 2009 Control Yuan motion against the Department of Health, after restaurants were found to be using the same cooking oil for a week.

In October 2013, Wu aided a Control Yuan investigation into the September 2013 power struggle, former justice minister Tseng Yung-fu, and prosecutor-general Huang Shih-ming, which also later affected Taiwan High Prosecutors’ Office head prosecutor Chen Shou-huang. In January 2014, an impeachment measure against Huang and supported by Wu was split 6–6.

After his six-year tenure ended, Wu was not renominated for a second term.

=== Straits Exchange Foundation ===
In October 2024, Wu was appointed chairman of the Straits Exchange Foundation. On 4 November 2024, he formally succeeded acting chair Rock Hsu, who had served since the resignation of Cheng Wen-tsan in July 2024. On 18 December 2025, Wu announced that his resignation from the Straits Exchange Foundation would be effective at year’s end.
