= Chang Jin-fu =

Taiwanese politician, engineer, and computer scientist (born 1948)

- 張進福
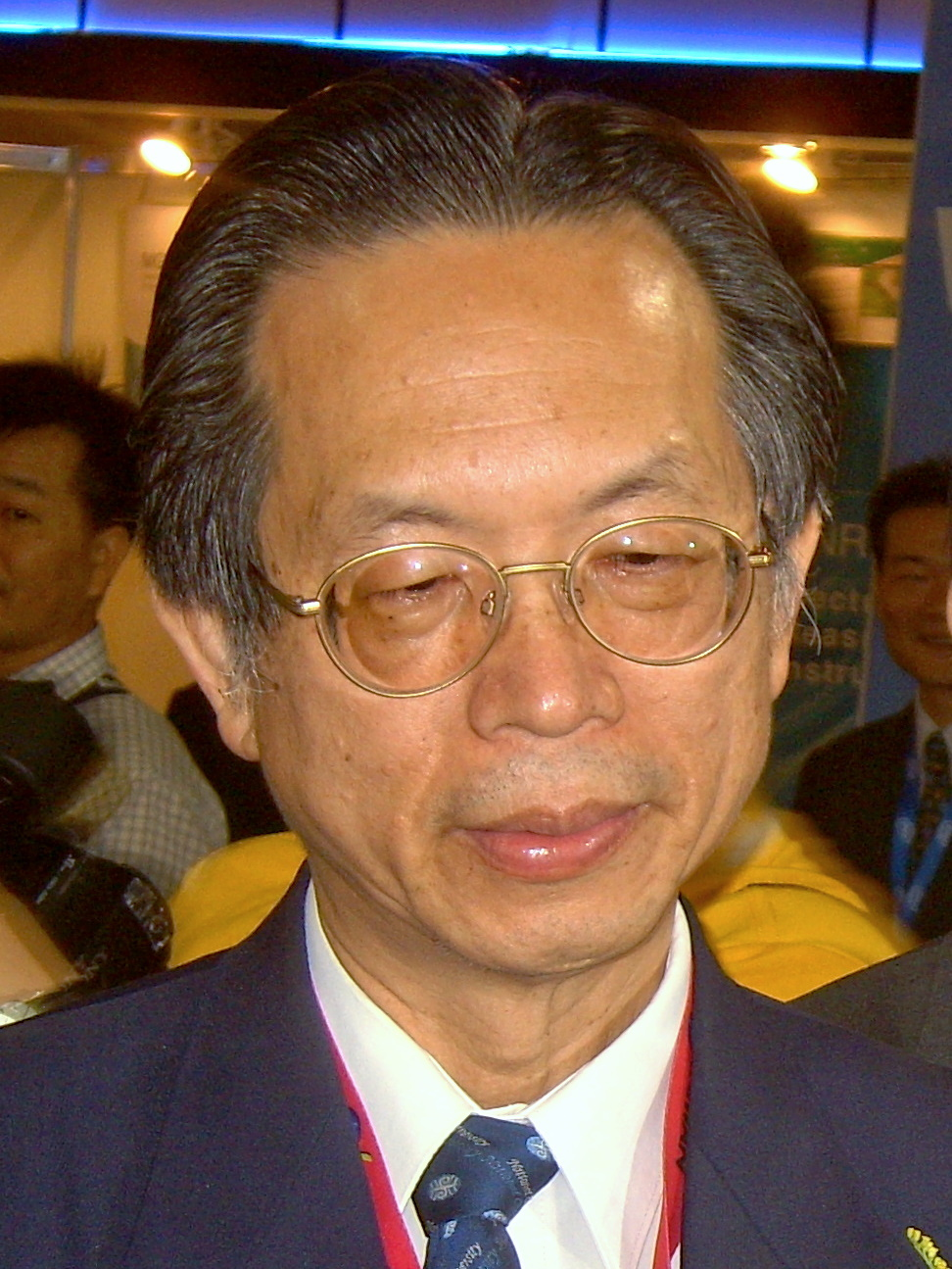

Governor of Taiwan Province
- In office 10 September 2009 – 26 February 2010
- Preceded by: Tsai Hsun-hsiung
- Succeeded by: Lin Junq-tzer

Deputy Minister of National Science Council of the Republic of China
- In office June 1996 – May 2000
- Minister: Liu Chao-shiuan; Huang Chen-tai

Personal details
- Born: 9 March 1948 (age 78) Yingge, Taipei County, Taiwan
- Education: National Taiwan University (BS); University of California, Berkeley (PhD)

Chang Jin-fu (Chinese: 張進福; pinyin: Zhāng Jìnfú; born 9 March 1948) is a Taiwanese politician, engineer, and computer scientist. He was the Governor of Taiwan Province from 2009 to 2010.

== Early life and education ==
Chang was born in Yingge Township, Taipei County, in 1948. After graduating from Cheng Kung Senior High School, he earned his bachelor's degree in electrical engineering from National Taiwan University (NTU) in 1970 and completed doctoral studies in the United States, where he earned his Ph.D. in electrical engineering and computer science from the University of California, Berkeley, in 1977. His doctoral dissertation, completed under Professor George L. Turin, was titled, "The Effect of Multipath Interference on the Performance of a Digital Matched Filter".

== Career ==
Upon graduation, Chang returned to Taiwan and spent most of his career in the academic world. He spent much of his early career time in teaching and research at the Department of Electrical Engineering of NTU, where he went through different positions and ranks from teaching assistant, instructor, associate professor to professor. He also served as the Chairman of the Department of Electrical Engineering of NTU for two years and Acting Dean of the Department of Engineering of NTU for two months.

He taught twice between 1982 and 1985 for 1.5 years at the Department of Electrical and Computer Engineering of the Naval Postgraduate School in Monterey, California, United States. He served as the Director of Science and Technology Advisory Office of the ROC Ministry of Education in July 1987 until June 1990. He became the Dean of Academic Affairs of National Central University in 1991–1994. He was appointed President of National Chi Nan University, Taiwan, from 2000 to 2008. From 2012 to 2015, he served as President of Yuan Ze University, Taiwan. He was also the Board Chairman Chairman of Institute for Information Industry (III) of Taiwan's III - Institute for Information Industry.

== Awards ==
He was elected to IEEE Fellow in 1994 for his technical contributions to wireless mobile communications.
