= Taoyuan City Constituency 3 =

Constituency of the Legislative Yuan of Taiwan

- Single-member constituency for the Legislative Yuan
- District(s): parts of Zhongli

Current constituency
- Created: 2008
- Member(s): John Wu Chih-yang (2008–2010); Huang Jen-shu (2010–2012); Chen Shei-saint (2012–2020); Lu Ming-che (2020–)

Taoyuan City Constituency 3 (Chinese: 桃園市第三選舉區; pinyin: Táoyuán Shì Dì-sān Xuǎnjǔ Qū) includes most of Zhongli in Taoyuan City. The district was formerly known as Taoyuan County Constituency 3 (2008-2014) and was created in 2008, when all local constituencies of the Legislative Yuan were reorganized to become single-member districts.

== Current district ==
- Zhongli:

== Legislators ==
Representative	Party	Dates	Notes
John Wu Chih-yang	Kuomintang	2008–2010	
Huang Jen-shu	Democratic Progressive Party	2010–2012	
Chen Shei-saint	Kuomintang	2012–2020	
Lu Ming-che	Kuomintang	2020–	Incumbent

== Election results ==
=== 2016 ===
Legislative Election 2016: Taoyuan City Constituency 3
Party	Candidate	Votes	%	±%
Kuomintang	Chen Shei-saint	77,510	44.71	–9.14
Democratic Progressive	Hsu Ching-wen	77,120	44.49	+4.56
Independent	Lai Lizhu	9,496	5.48	+5.48
Minkuotang	Chen Hongrui	8,726	5.03	+5.03
Others	Yu Nengsheng	492	0.28	+0.28
Majority		390	0.22	–13.71
Total valid votes		173,344	98.51	
Rejected ballots		2,615	1.49	
Kuomintang hold		Swing	–13.71	
Turnout		175,959	67.79	–8.24
Registered electors		259,562		

=== 2024 ===
Legislative Election 2024: Taoyuan City Constituency 3
Party	Candidate	Votes	%	±%
Kuomintang	Lu Ming-che	102,056	46.84	
Democratic Progressive	Peng Chun Hao	95,581	43.87	
Taiwan Obasang Political Equality Party	Hsu Ying Tzu	11,258	5.17	
New	Yu Chih-Pin	8,280	3.80	
Institutional Island of Saving the World	Tai Cheh	721	0.33	
Majority		6,475	2.97	
Total valid votes		217,896		
Kuomintang hold		Swing		
