= Yuan Ze University =

Private university in Taiwan

Coordinates: 24°58′10.99″N 121°16′2.91″E

- 元智大學
- Motto: 誠、勤、樸、慎(Pe̍h-ōe-jī: sêng, khîn, phok, sīn)
- Motto in English: Sincerity, Diligence, Thrift, Prudence
- Type: Private
- Established: 1989
- President: Ching-Jong Liao (President)
- Location: Zhongli, Taoyuan City, Taiwan
- Website: www.yzu.edu.tw

Chinese name
- Simplified Chinese: 元智大学
- Traditional Chinese: 元智大學
Transcriptions
Standard Mandarin
- Hanyu Pinyin: Yuánzhì Dàxué
Southern Min
- Hokkien POJ: Goân-tì Tāi-ha̍k

Yuan Ze University (YZU; Chinese: 元智大學; Pe̍h-ōe-jī: Goân-tì Tāi-ha̍k) is a private university located in Taoyuan City, Taiwan. Established in 1989, YZU campus is in Zhongli District, Taoyuan; Taipei; and Bade District, Taoyuan.

Yuan Ze University has six colleges offering a wide range of undergraduate and graduate programs:

College of Engineering	Department of Mechanical Engineering; Department of Chemical Engineering and Materials Science; Department of Industrial Engineering and Management; International Bachelor Program in Engineering; Post-Baccalaureate Program for Carbon Zero Sustainable Development; Master Program in Smart Manufacturing for Electronics (Industry-Academia Collaboration)
College of Informatics	Department of Computer Science and Engineering; Department of Information Management; Department of Information Communication; Graduate Program in Biomedical Informatics; International Bachelor Program in Informatics
College of Management	Bachelor of Business Administration Program; English Bachelor of Business Administration Program; Master of Business Administration Program; Master of Science in Finance and Accounting; Executive MBA Program; Doctoral Program in Management; Master of Science in International Finance and Accounting (Industry-Academia Collaboration)
College of Humanities and Social Sciences	Department of Foreign Languages and Applied Linguistics; Department of Chinese Language and Literature; Department of Social and Policy Sciences; Department of Art and Design; Master Program in Art and Design Management; Doctor of Philosophy in Cultural Industries and Cultural Policy; International Bachelor Program in Strategic Communication
College of Electrical and Communication Engineering	Department of Electrical Engineering; International Bachelor Program in Electrical and Communication Engineering
College of Medicine and Nursing	Graduate Institute of Medicine; School of Nursing; Graduate School of Biotechnology and Bioengineering

== Office of Research and Development ==
Research Centers	Environmental Technology Research Center; Management Competency Development and Research Center; Innovation and Entrepreneurship Center; Green Technology Research Center; Communications Research Center; Gerontechnology Research Center; Innovation Center for Big Data and Digital Convergence; Research Center for Smart Production and Innovative Management; Innovation Center for Artificial Intelligence Applications; ZDT Group–Yuan Ze University Joint Research and Development Center for Big Data

== Presidents ==
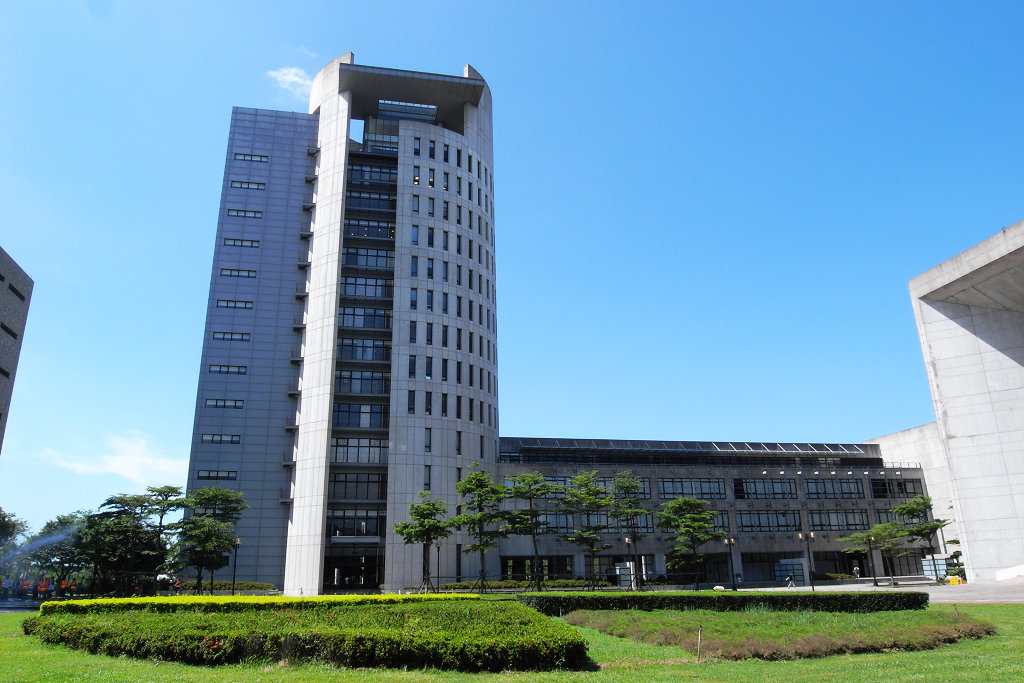
Yuan Ze University building

- Wang Kuo-Ming (王國明): August 1989 – July 1999
- Chan Shih-Hung (詹世弘): August 1999 – July 2005
- Perng Tsong-Pyng (彭宗平): August 2005 – July 2012
- Chang Jin-Fu (張進福): August 2012 – July 2015
- Hsu Tze-Chi (徐澤志): August 2015 – January 2016
- Wu Jyh-Yang (吳志揚): February 2016 – January 2022
- Liao Ching-Jong (廖慶榮): February 2022 – present

== Recognitions and awards ==
=== Times Higher Education (THE) Rankings ===
- In “THE World University Rankings 2026,” Yuan Ze University was ranked 601st–800th globally.
- In “THE Asia University Rankings 2025,” Yuan Ze University was ranked 229th in Asia.
- In “THE Impact Rankings 2025,” Yuan Ze University was ranked 301st–400th globally. Specifically, it ranked 26th globally for SDG 11 (Sustainable Cities and Communities), and 35th globally for SDG 17 (Partnerships for the Goals).

=== QS Quacquarelli Symonds Rankings ===
- In “QS World University Rankings 2026,” Yuan Ze University was ranked 1001st-1200th globally。
- In “QS World University Rankings: Asia 2025,” Yuan Ze University was ranked 315th in Asia.
- In “QS World University Rankings: Sustainability 2025,” Yuan Ze University was ranked 968th globally.

== Alumni ==
=== Notable alumni ===
Yuan Ze University has produced graduates who have excelled in various fields including business, technology, and academia. See the full list on the Yuan Ze University Notable Alumni page.

=== YZU Distinguished Alumni ===
The university also recognizes outstanding graduates who have made significant contributions to society and their professions. See the complete list on the Yuan Ze University Distinguished Alumni page.

== See also ==
- List of universities in Taiwan
