= John Wu (politician) =

Taiwanese politician

Wu Chih-yang MLY
- 吳志揚
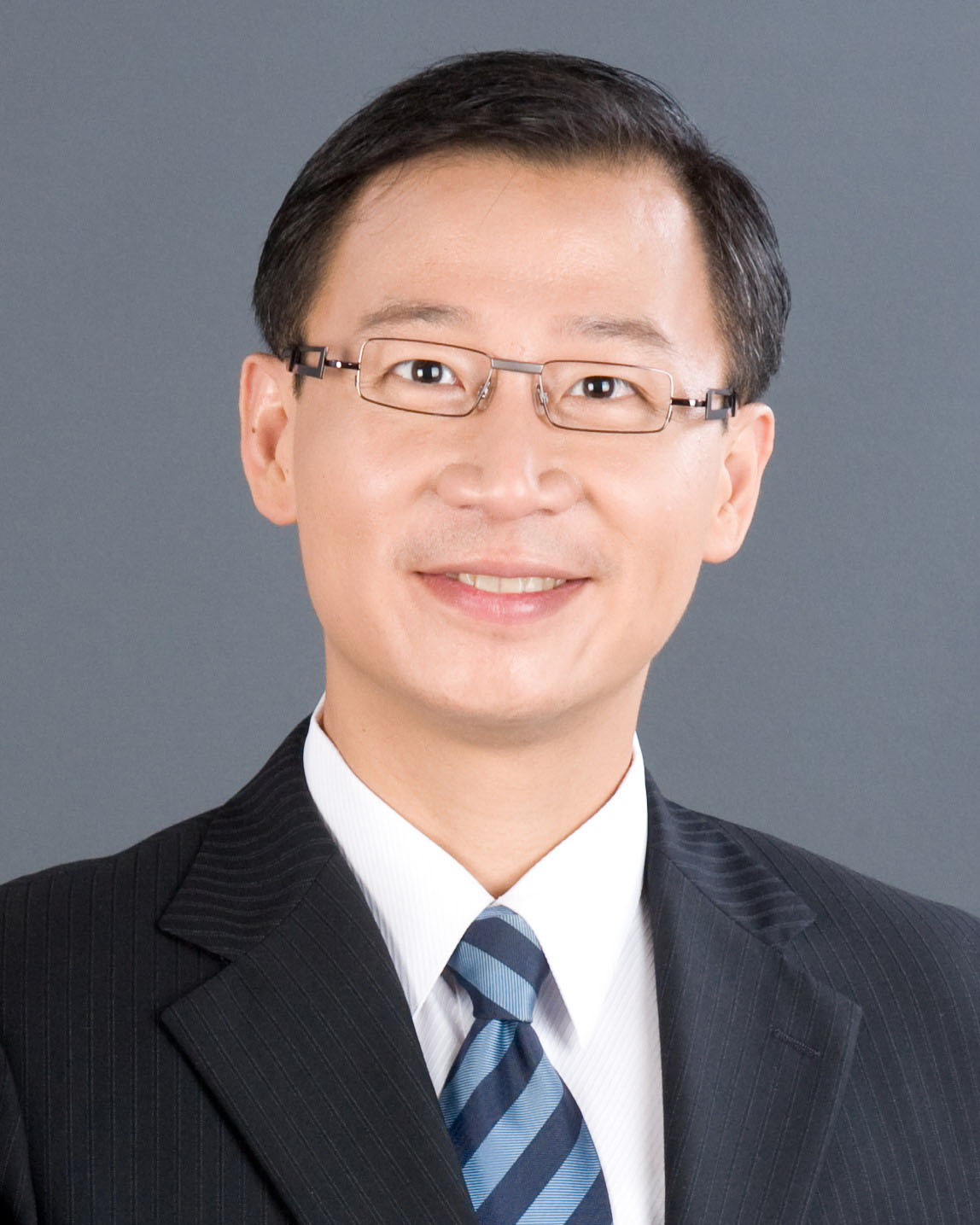
- Official portrait, 2009

Commissioner of the Chinese Professional Baseball League
- In office 4 February 2015 – 16 January 2019
- Preceded by: Hsieh Chih-peng (acting); Huang Chen-tai
- Succeeded by: Tsai Chi-chang

Member of the Legislative Yuan
- In office 1 February 2016 – 31 January 2020
- Constituency: Party-list
- In office 1 February 2005 – 20 December 2009
- Succeeded by: Huang Jen-shu
- Constituency: Taoyuan; Taoyuan 3rd (after 2008)

Magistrate of Taoyuan County
- In office 20 December 2009 – 25 December 2014
- Deputy: Lee Chao-chih, Huang Hung-pin; Ye Shi-wen
- Preceded by: Eric Chu; Huang Min-kon (acting)
- Succeeded by: Position abolished; Cheng Wen-tsan as mayor of new municipality

Personal details
- Born: 8 February 1969 (age 57) Zhongli City, Taoyuan County (now Zhongli District, Taoyuan City), Taiwan
- Party: Kuomintang
- Relations: Wu Po-hsiung (father)
- Education: National Taiwan University (LLB, LLM); Harvard University (LLM)

Wu Chih-yang (Chinese: 吳志揚; pinyin: Wú Zhìyáng; born 8 February 1969), also known by his English name John Wu, is a Taiwanese lawyer and politician. He was the Magistrate of Taoyuan County from 2009 to 2014. Wu was the former Chinese Professional Baseball League (CPBL) commissioner.

== Early life and education ==
Wu was born in Zhongli District, Taoyuan, on February 8, 1969. His father is politician Wu Po-hsiung.

After high school, Wu attended law school at National Taiwan University and graduated with a Bachelor of Laws (LL.B.) specializing in judicial administration and a Master of Laws (LL.M.) specializing in jurisprudence in 1996. He then pursued graduate studies in the United States at Harvard University, where he earned a second LL.M. degree from Harvard Law School in 1997 under law professor William P. Alford.

== Taoyuan County Magistrate ==
=== 2009 Taoyuan County Magistrate election ===
Wu was elected Magistrate of Taoyuan County on 5 December 2009 defeating Cheng Wen-tsan in the 2009 magisterial election as a Kuomintang candidate. He assumed the office on 20 December 2009.

2009 Taoyuan County Magistrate Election Result
No.	Party	Candidate	Votes	Percentage
1	Hakka Party	Wu Futong (吳富彤)	15,087	2.08%
2	DPP	Cheng Wen-tsan	346,678	45.69%
3	KMT	John Wu	396,237	52.22%

=== Taoyuan County upgrade ===
In July 2014, it was announced that Taoyuan County would be renamed Taoyuan and reclassified as a special municipality by the end of the year. The county-administered city, known officially as Taoyuan City, was to be renamed Taoyuan District.

=== 2014 Taoyuan City mayoral election ===
Shortly before the reclassification of Taoyuan County as a special municipality, Wu ran for the Taoyuan mayoralty in the 2014 Taiwanese local elections, again facing Cheng Wen-tsan, and lost.

2014 Taoyuan City Mayoralty Election Result
No.	Candidate	Party	Votes	Percentage
1	Cheng Wen-tsan	DPP	492,414	51.00%
2	John Wu	KMT	463,133	47.97%
3	Hsu Jiu-chih (許睿智)	Independent	9,943	1.03%

== CPBL Commissioner ==
Wu became the commissioner of Taiwan's Chinese Professional Baseball League in 2015, and was reelected in 2017 with unanimous support. During Wu's term, he further expanded CPBL from four teams to five teams, with the addition of Wei Chuan Dragons. As Wu's term ended, Tsai Chi-chang became Wu's successor as CPBL commissioner in January 2021.

== Personal life ==
Wu is married to Hung Hsiu-hua.
