= Chen Lai Su-mei =

Taiwanese politician (born 1964)

- 陳賴素美

Member of the Legislative Yuan
- In office 1 February 2016 – 31 January 2020
- Preceded by: Liao Cheng-ching
- Succeeded by: Huang Shih-chieh
- Constituency: Taoyuan City 2

Member of the Taoyuan City Council
- In office 25 December 2014 – 31 January 2016
- Constituency: District 9 (Yangmei)

Member of the Taoyuan County Council
- In office 25 December 2006 – 24 December 2014
- Constituency: District 9 (Yangmei)

Personal details
- Born: 10 January 1964 (age 62) Hsinchu County, Taiwan
- Party: Democratic Progressive Party
- Education: Vanung University (BA); National Central University (MBA)

Chen Lai Su-mei (Chinese: 陳賴素美; born 10 January 1964) is a Taiwanese politician.

== Education ==
Chen Lai is a graduate of the National Hsinchu Commercial and Vocational High School. She subsequently earned a bachelor's degree from Vanung University and earned her Master of Business Administration (M.B.A.) degree at National Central University.

== Political career ==
Chen Lai was a member of the Taoyuan County Council from 2006 to 2014, when she was elected to the first Taoyuan City Council. Chen Lai left her Taoyuan City Council seat vacant upon election to the Legislative Yuan in 2016. As a member of the Legislative Yuan, she commented on Taiwanese labor laws on the regulation of overtime.
