= Bade District =

Coordinates: 24°57′27.43″N 121°17′55.62″E

Bade 八德區
- District
- Bade District
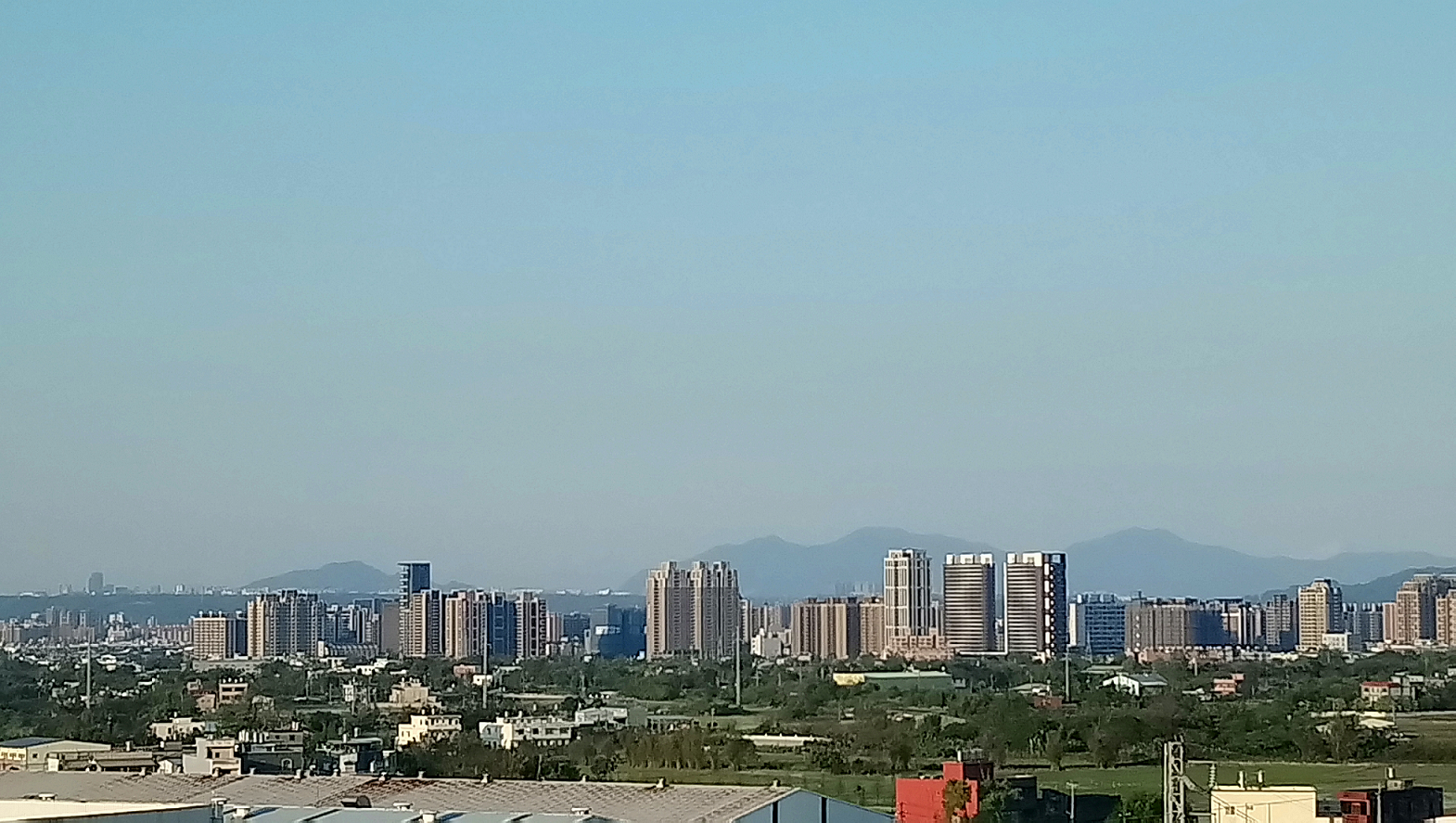
- Bade District in Taoyuan City

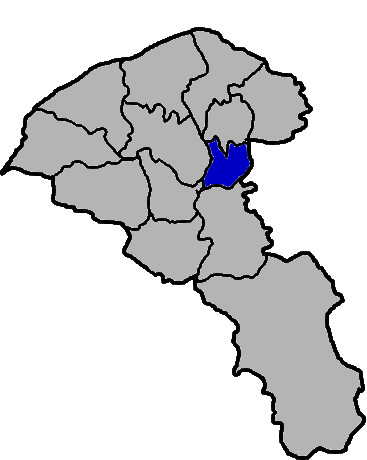
- Country: Taiwan
- Municipality: Taoyuan City

Government
  - Type: District
  - Mayor: Ho Cheng-sen

Area
  - Total: 33.71 km^{2} (13.02 sq mi)

Population (September 2024)
  - Total: 214,428
  - Density: 6,361/km^{2} (16,470/sq mi)
- Website: www.bade.tycg.gov.tw (in Chinese)

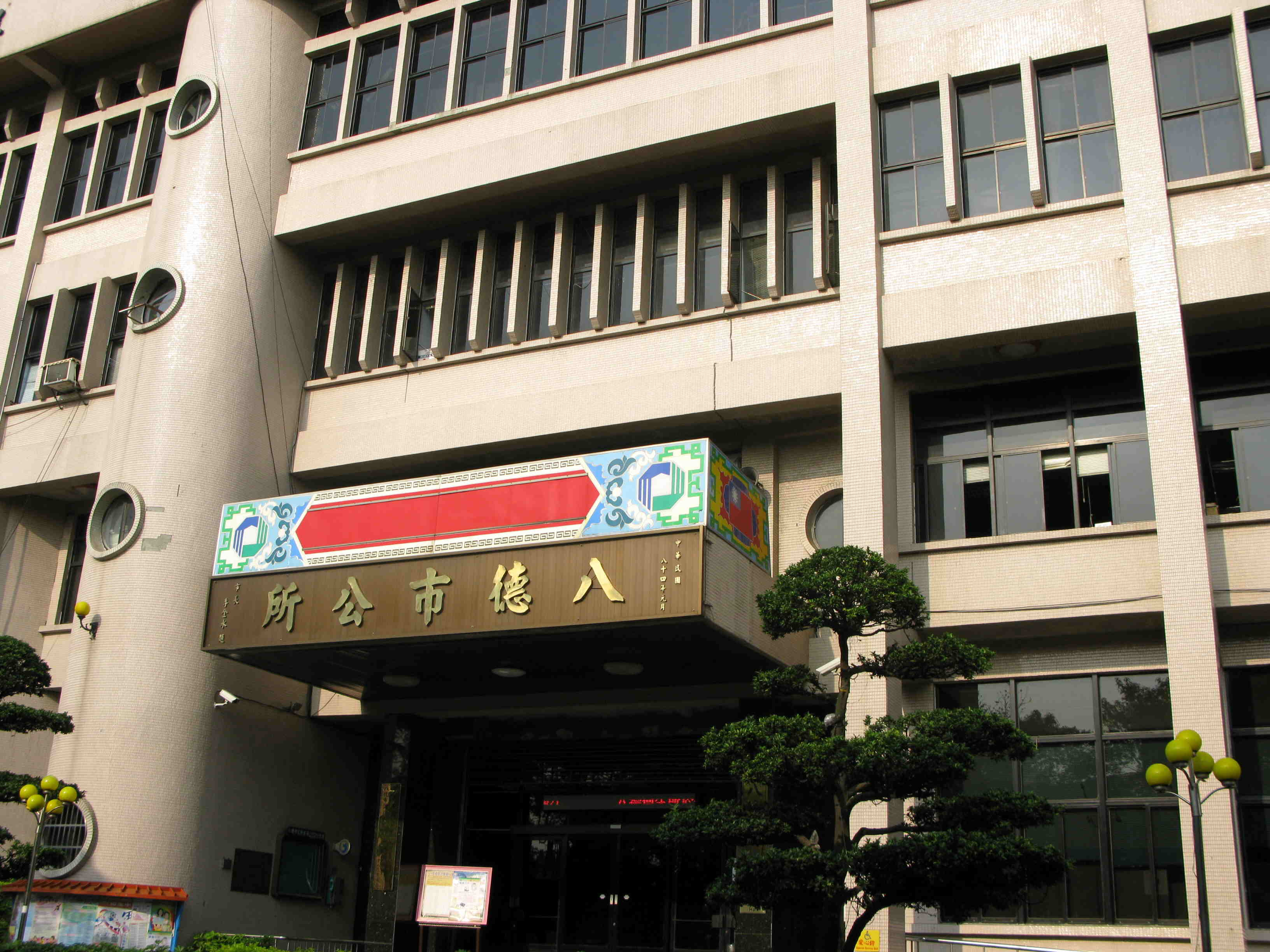
Bade District office (then Bade City Hall)

Bade District (Chinese: 八德區; pinyin: Bādé Qū) is a district in the central part of Taoyuan City, Taiwan (Republic of China). It is the smallest district by area in Taoyuan City.

== History ==
Bade City was originally established as Bakuaicuo (八塊厝) during Qing Dynasty rule. During the period of Japanese rule, it was called Hachitoku Village (八塊庄), and was governed under the Tōen District (桃園郡) of Shinchiku Prefecture.

After the handover of Taiwan from Japan to the Republic of China, the area was established as a rural township named Bade Township in 1946. In 1995, it was upgraded as a county-administered city named Bade City (Chinese: 八德市; pinyin: Bādé Shì). On 25 December 2014, it became Bade District.

== Geography ==
Area: 33.71 square kilometres (13.02 sq mi)
Population: 214,428 (September 2024)

== Administrative divisions ==
The district comprises 48 villages: Bailu, Daai, Daan, Dachang, Dacheng, Dafa, Dafu, Dahan, Dahe, Dahong, Dahua, Dajiang, Daming, Danan, Daqian, Daqing, Daren, Darong, Dashun, Datong, Daxin, Daxing, Dayi, Dayong, Dazheng, Dazhi, Dazhong, Dazhu, Fuxing, Gaocheng, Gaoming, Guangde, Guanglong, Guangxing, Jiadong, Jiaming, Liuguang, Longyou, Ruide, Ruifa, Ruifeng, Ruitai, Ruixiang, Ruixing, Xiaoli, Xingren, Yongfeng and Zhuyuan.

== Demographics ==
By 2021, there was a group of people who originated from the Matsu Islands.

== Education ==
- National Defense University
- Yung-Feng High School
- Ba-de Junior High School
- Da-Cheng Junior High School
- Cha-Dong Elementary School
- Da-Yun Elementary School
- Bade Elementary School

== Tourist attractions ==
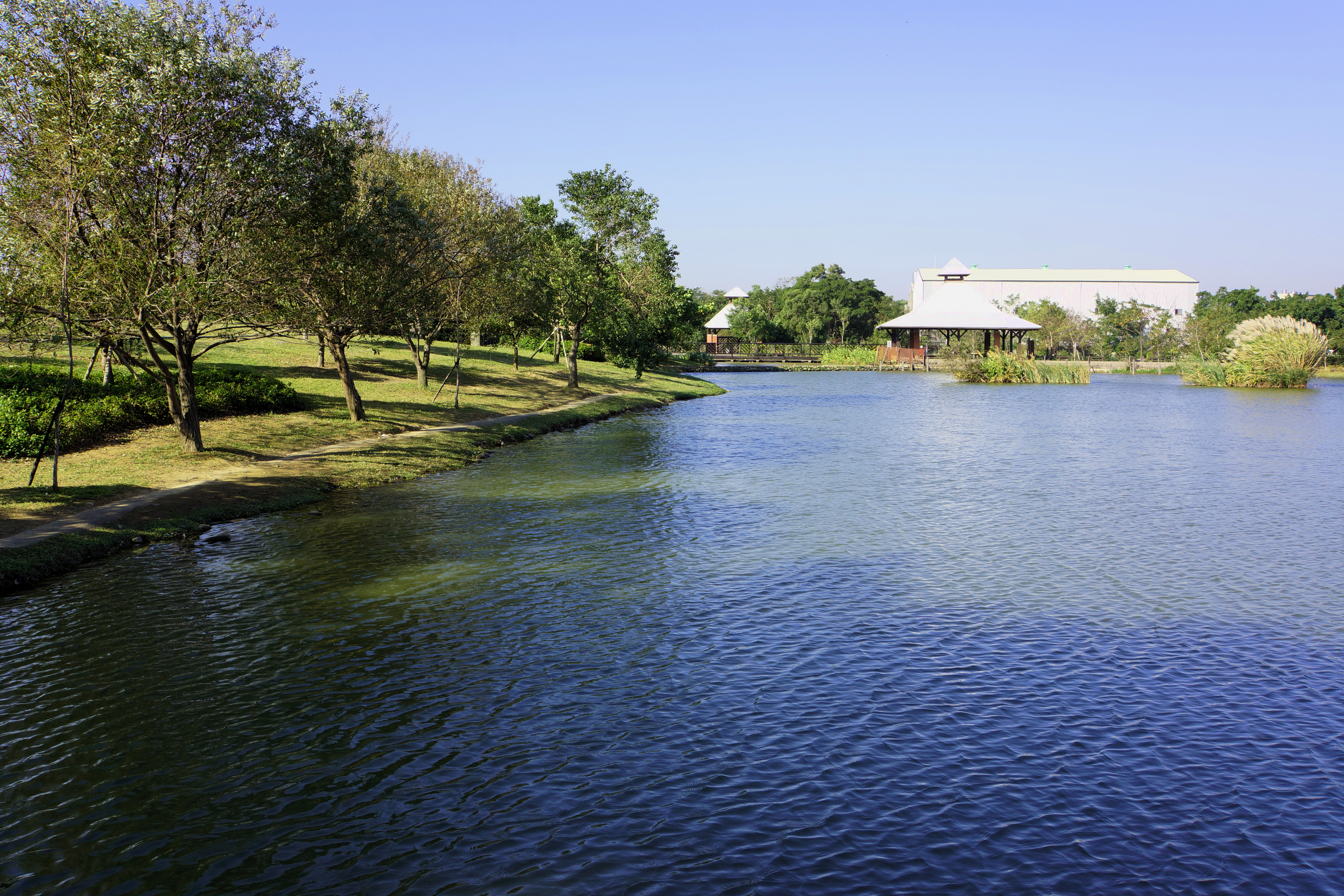
Bade Pond Ecological Park

- Arts Square
- Bade Pond Ecological Park
- Fengshujiao Leisure Park
- Guangfong First Park
- Republic of Chocolate
- Sunshine Life Park

== Transportation ==
Bade is served by National Freeway 2.

== Notable natives ==
- Chao Cheng-yu, member of Legislative Yuan
- Cheng Wen-tsan, Mayor of Taoyuan City
- Eric Chu, Mayor of New Taipei City (2016–2018)
