= Apollo Chen =

Taiwanese journalist and politician

Chen Shei-saint MLY
- 陳學聖
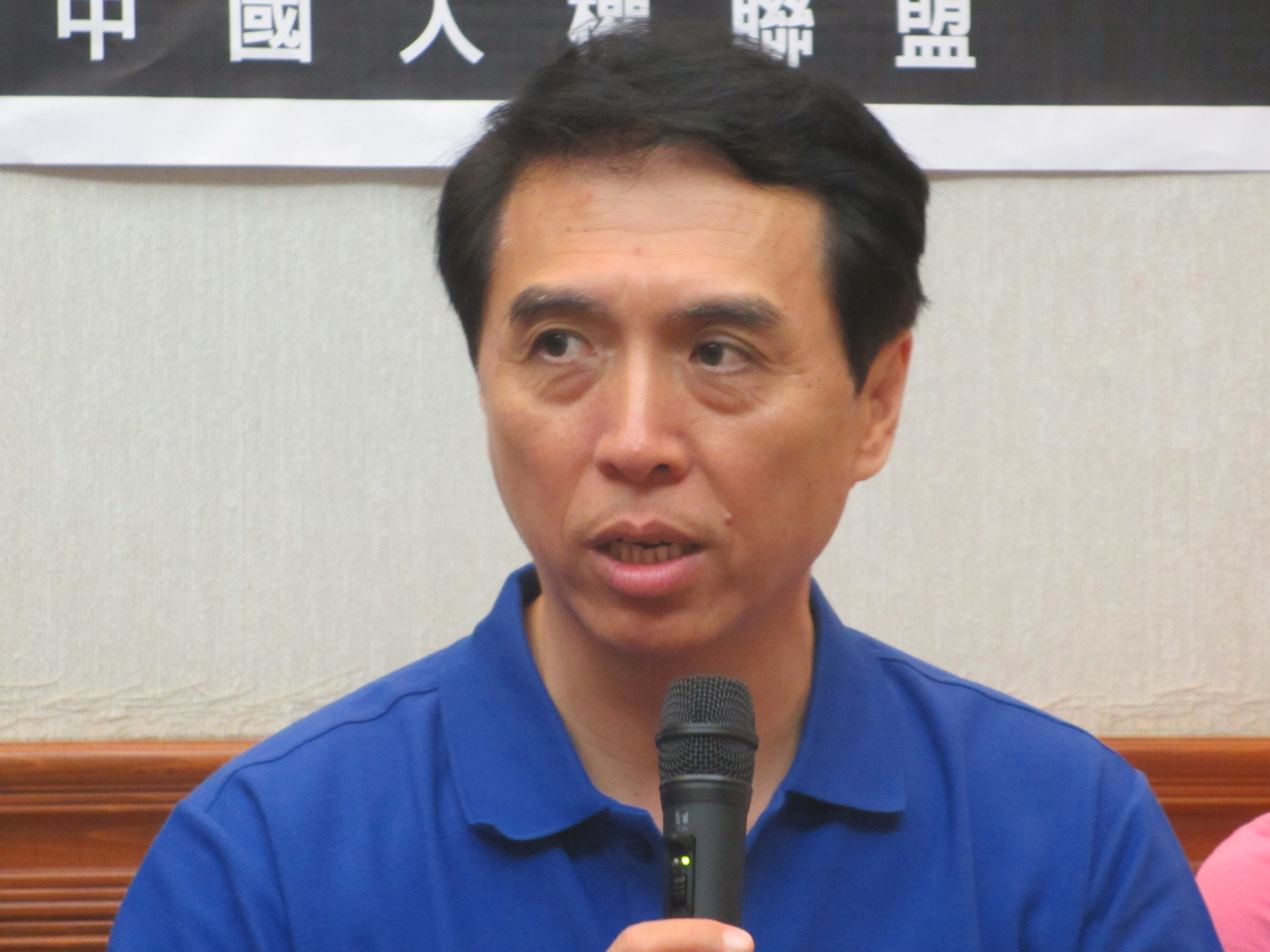
- Chen in July 2016

Member of the Legislative Yuan
- In office 1 February 2012 – 1 February 2020
- Preceded by: Huang Jen-shu
- Succeeded by: Lu Ming-che
- Constituency: Taoyuan 3rd
- In office 1 February 1999 – 31 January 2005
- Constituency: Taipei 2nd

Personal details
- Born: 28 September 1957 (age 69) Taipei, Taiwan
- Party: Kuomintang
- Education: National Taiwan University (BA); Tamkang University (MA)

Chen Shei-saint (Chinese: 陳學聖; pinyin: Chén Xuéshèng; born 28 September 1957), also known by his English name Apollo Chen, is a Taiwanese journalist and politician.

== Education and early career ==
Chen was born in Taipei, Taiwan, in 1957. He graduated from Taipei Municipal Chien Kuo High School in 1976. During high school, he was classmates with James C. Liao and Wang Fan-sen.

After high school, Chen earned a bachelor's degree in political science from National Taiwan University and a master's degree in Chinese studies from Tamkang University. He wrote for the China Daily News and China Times and was also a television anchor on Asia Television.

== Political career ==
Chen served on the Taipei City Council from 1991 to 1998. His first stint in the Legislative Yuan began the next year and lasted until 2005. Chen was the spokesman of Lien Chan's 2000 presidential campaign. In between legislative stints, he was the director of the Taoyuan County Cultural Affairs Bureau. Chen, backed by the Kuomintang, ran for the legislature again in the Taoyuan County by-election of 2010, losing to Huang Jen-shu by approximately 3,000 votes. He returned to the legislature in 2012. In 2014, Chen was suspended from the Kuomintang for casting a vote against the Land Administration Agent Act. However, the censure did not prevent him from running for reelection in 2016, which he won. It was initially reported that Chen had defeated Hsu Ching-wen by 390 votes. A recount by the Taoyuan District Court revealed that Chen had won by 389 votes.

=== 2016 KMT chairmanship election ===
His party's presidential candidate, Eric Chu, was not successful and subsequently resigned the KMT chairmanship. Chen declared his interest in the position a few days after Chu's resignation was finalized. On 22 February, Chen submitted a petition of 24,179 signatures to the party committee responsible for overseeing elections. The party confirmed 10,710 of those signatures, validating his candidacy. Chen finished fourth in the election, which was won by Hung Hsiu-chu.

2016 Kuomintang chairmanship election
No.	Candidate	Party	Votes	Percentage	Result
1	Hung Hsiu-chu	Kuomintang	78,829	56.16%	
2	Huang Min-hui	Kuomintang	46,341	33.02%	
3	Lee Hsin	Kuomintang	7,604	5.42%	
4	Apollo Chen	Kuomintang	6,784	4.83%	
Total votes			337,351		
Turnout			41.61%		

=== 2018 Taoyuan mayor election ===
In March 2018, the Kuomintang announced that Chen had defeated Lu Ming-che and Yang Li-huan in a primary held to decide the party's candidate in the Taoyuan mayoral election.

2018 Kuomintang Taoyuan City mayoral primary results
Candidates	Place	Results
Apollo Chen	Nominated	35.689%
Lu Ming-zhe	2nd	33.067%
Yang Li-huan	3rd	31.245%

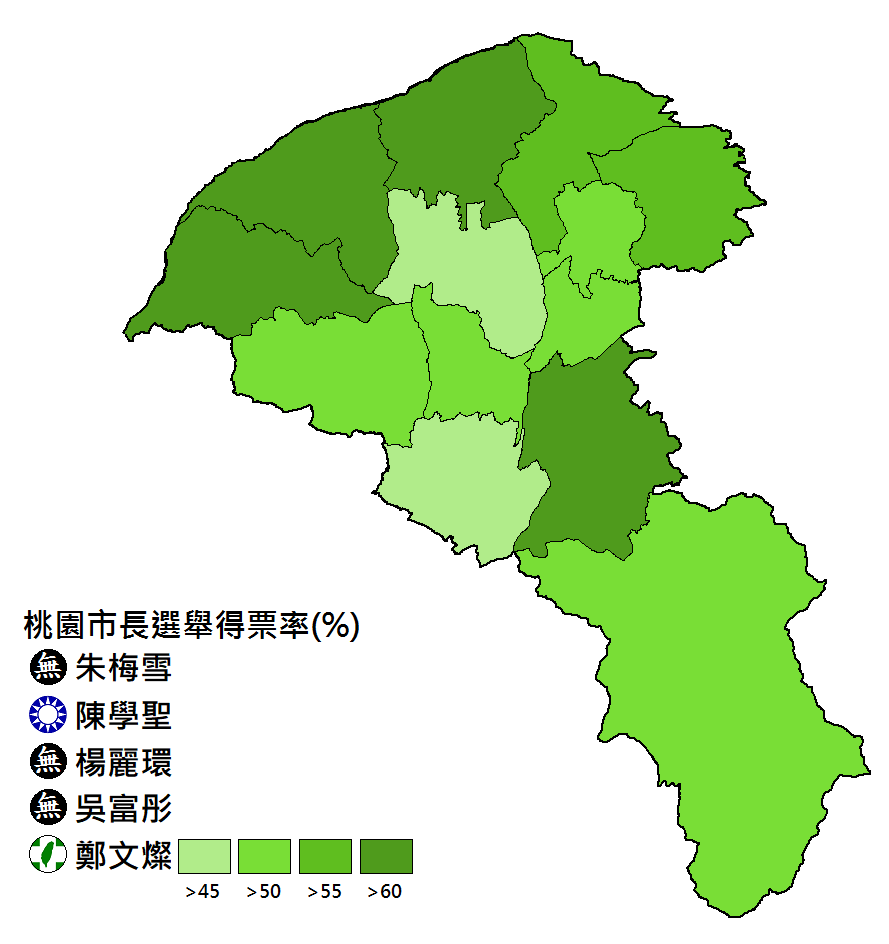
2018 Taoyuan mayor election result

2018 Taoyuan City mayoral results
No.	Candidate	Party	Votes	Percentage
1	Zhu Mei-xue (朱梅雪)	Independent	18,200	1.76%
2	Apollo Chen	Kuomintang	407,234	39.42%
3	Yang Li-huan (楊麗環)	Independent	51,518	4.99%
4	Wu Fu-tong (吳富彤)	Independent	3,867	0.37%
5	Cheng Wen-tsan	Democratic Progressive Party	552,330	53.46%
Total voters			1,732,591	
Valid votes			1,033,149	
Invalid votes				
Voter turnout			59.63%	
