= Xinwu District, Taoyuan =

District in Taoyuan City, Taiwan

Xinwu 新屋區 Sinwu
- District
- Xinwu District
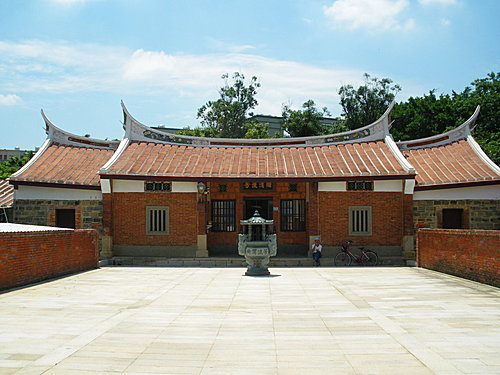

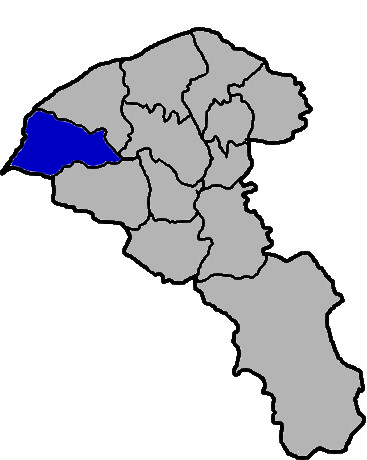
- Coordinates: 24°58′41″N 121°04′03″E
- Country: Taiwan
- Region: Northern Taiwan

Government
  - Mayor: Xu Tongzhi

Area
  - Total: 85.0166 km^{2} (32.8251 sq mi)

Population (February 2023)
  - Total: 49,211
  - Density: 578.84/km^{2} (1,499.2/sq mi)
- Website: www.xinwu.tycg.gov.tw (in Chinese)

Xinwu
- Chinese: 新屋
- Postal: Sinwu
Transcriptions
Standard Mandarin
- Hanyu Pinyin: Xīnwū
- Wade–Giles: Hsin-wu

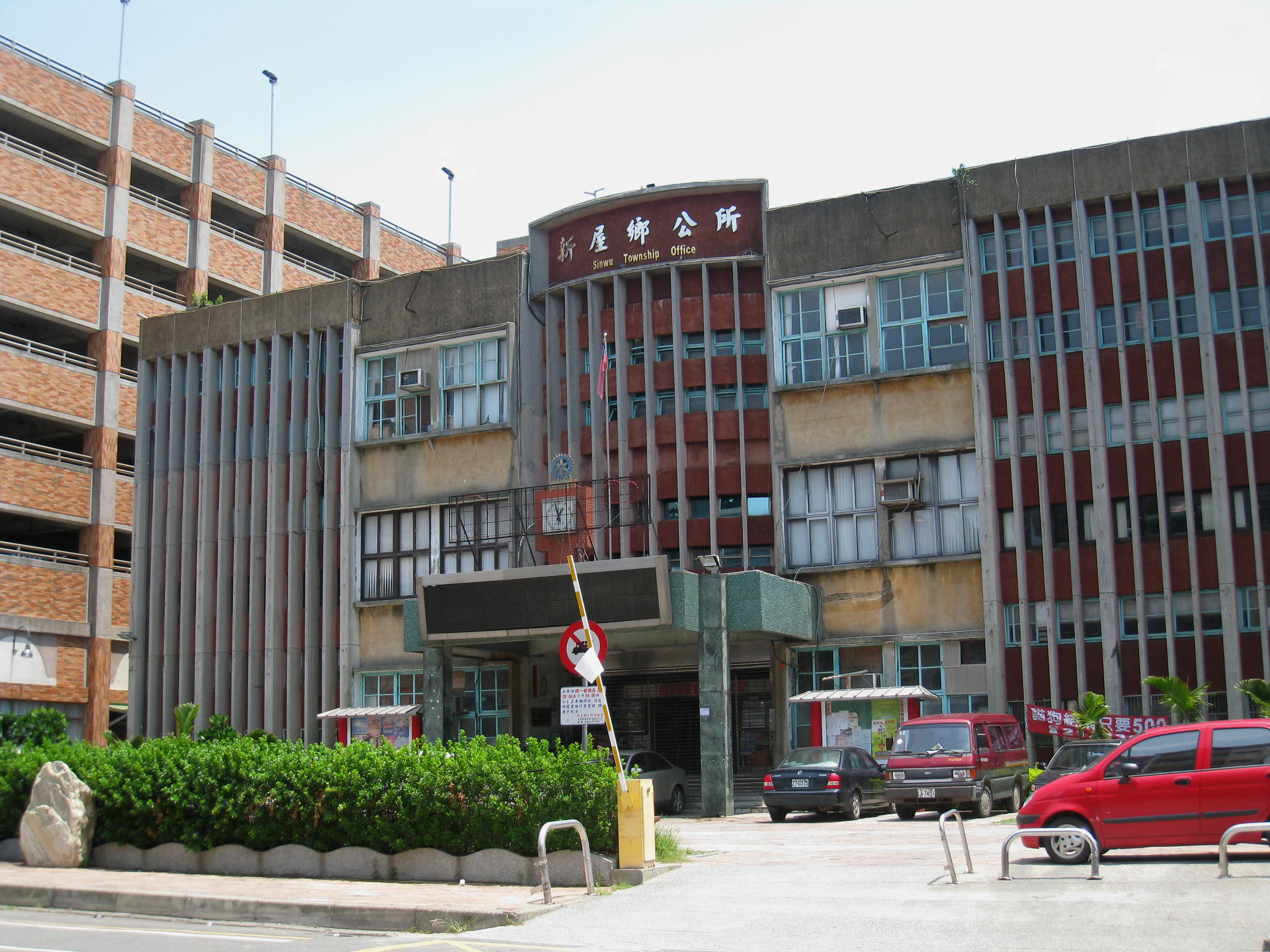
Xinwu District office

Xinwu or Sinwu District is a rural, coastal district in Taoyuan City, Taiwan, home to 49,046 people, most of whom are Hakka.

== Geography ==
- Area: 85.02 square kilometres (32.83 sq mi)
- Population: 49,211 (February 2023)

Xinwu District accounts for almost 7% of Taoyuan's total land area and is the city's 6th largest district. Local industries include agriculture, fisheries, and livestock. 88% of Xinwu residents are Hakka.

Many rivers flow through the district, including the Shezih, Sinwu, Foshing, Fusing and Houhu.

== Administrative divisions ==
- Xinwu
- Xinsheng
- Houhu
- Qinghua
- Shilei
- Tungming
- Shezi
- Puding
- Jiudou
- Touzhou
- Dapo
- Wangjian
- Houzhuang
- Kejian
- Shenzun
- Kanglang
- Bengang
- Yongan
- Yongxing
- Xiapu
- Shipai
- Xiatian
- Chilan Village

== Education ==
Xinwu has eleven elementary schools, four junior high schools, and two high schools. It also has one district nursery, three kindergartens, other private kindergartens, and a district library.

== Tourist attractions ==
=== Farms, Gardens, and Parks ===
- Changshiang Education Farm
- Fengtian Health Farm
- Jiudou Mulberry Garden
- Jiudou Village Recreational Farm
- Longshen Pitaya Farm
- Power Farm
- Xinwu Lotus Garden
- Xinwu Flower Leisure Park
- Xinwu Green Corridor

=== Museums ===
- Xinwu Rice Story House
- Pacific Bicycle Museum

=== Fishing Ports ===
- Yong'an Fishing Port

=== Temples ===
- Xinwu Tianhou Temple, 2nd-tallest statue of Goddess Mazu in Taiwan and the 3rd-tallest in the world

=== Others ===
- Wangjian Hakka Rice Food Production Center

== Transportation ==
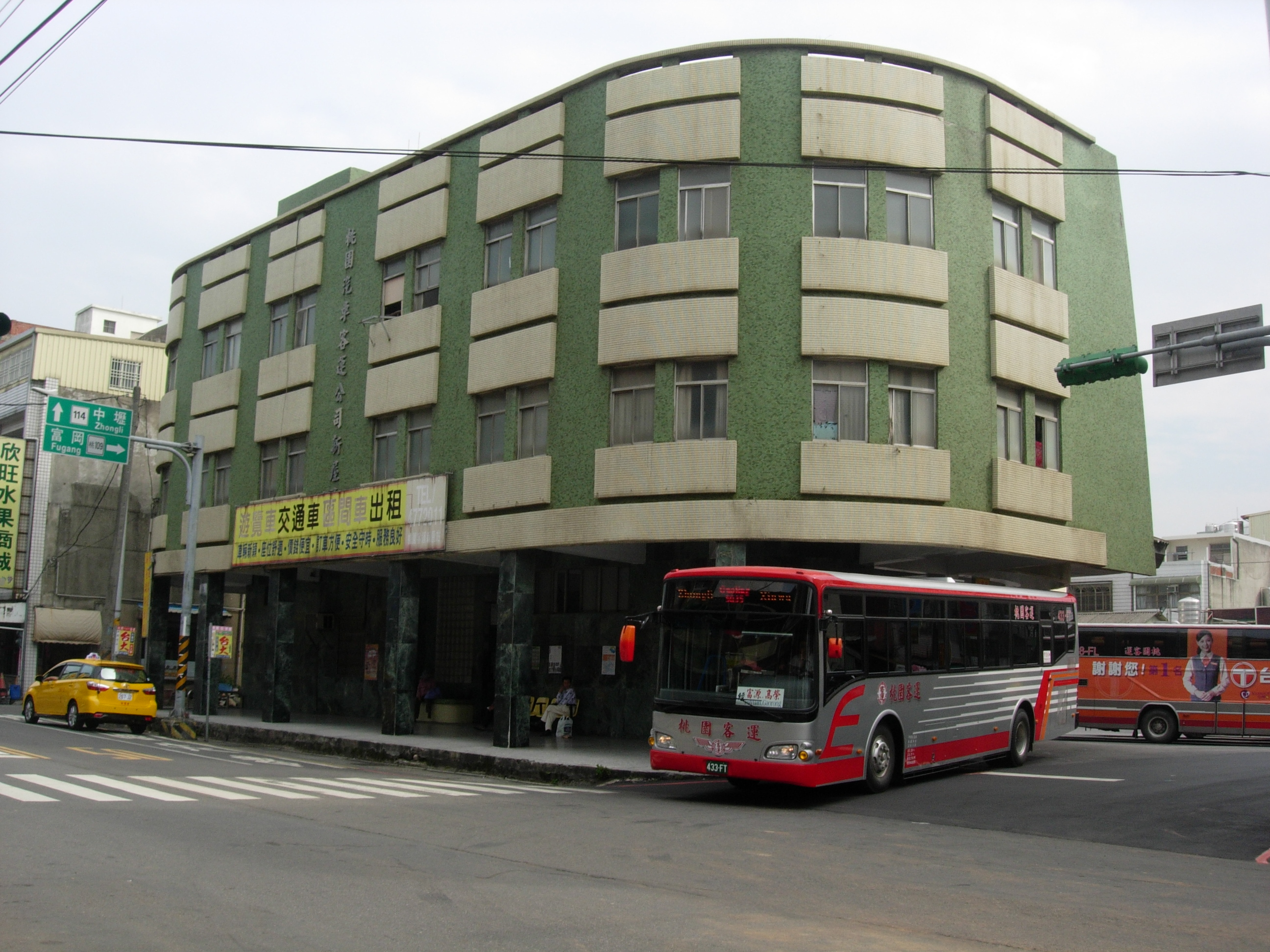
Xinwu Bus Station

Xinwu is served by Xinwu Bus Station, Provincial Highways 15, 61, and 66, and City Routes 114 and 115. The Taiwan High Speed Rail passes through the eastern part of the district, but there is no station in Xinwu. The closest HSR service is at Taoyuan HSR station in Zhongli District.

== Notable natives ==
- Apple Huang, singer, actress, and television host
- Fan Liang-shiow, politician
- Hsu Kuo-tai, politician
- Luo Wen-jia, politician
