= Yao Chiang-lin =

Taiwanese politician (1950–2026)

- 姚江臨

Member of the National Assembly
- In office 30 May 2005 – 7 June 2005

Personal details
- Born: 17 July 1950
- Died: 9 January 2026 (aged 75)
- Party: Kuomintang

Yao Chiang-lin (Chinese: 姚江臨; pinyin: Yáo Jiānglín; 17 July 1950 – 9 January 2026) was a Taiwanese politician.

== Life and career ==
Yao was born on 17 July 1950, and led the Alliance of Unhappy Fathers. Throughout his political career, he supported the labor movement and labor unions. Yao himself was a labor activist, and past member of the board of directors of Taipower's labor union.

Prior to the 2004 legislative election, Yao was included on the Kuomintang's party list for the Legislative Yuan. He was also recognized as a member of the party's Central Standing Committee. In 2005, Yao was elected to the National Assembly. In 2006, Yao was reelected to the KMT Central Standing Committee. During that election cycle, allegations of bribery became a concern. Yao indicated that he had attended an election-related party, but did not observe any instances of bribery. That same year, Yao advocated that the Kuomintang lead protests to pass bills supporting cross-strait transport initiatives. He also called for President Chen Shui-bian to resign, following allegations of corruption against Chen. In 2007, Yao described the selection of Su Jun-pin as Kuomintang spokesperson as "quite controversial", because Su had previously been critical of the party as a commentator. After the resignation of Ma Ying-jeou from the party chairmanship, Yao commented on the Kuomintang's electoral processes for the scheduled by-election. During a period of party infighting, Yao expressed support for Wang Jin-pyng. Yao ranked 29th on the Kuomintang party list in the 2008 legislative election, and was not seated to the Legislative Yuan. In 2009, the Kuomintang revoked Yao's Central Standing Committee membership, due to allegations of bribery in the previous election. However, he won reelection in both 2010 and 2011. When Ma Ying-jeou was considering running for reelection as Kuomintang chairman, Yao again offered comment on electoral procedures, as well as party reform efforts, and Ma's performance as chair. In 2013, Yao was the third leading vote getter in the KMT CSC election. After the Kuomintang lost the presidential and legislative elections in 2016 and Eric Chu resigned from the party chairmanship, Yao called on Wu Den-yih to run in the chairmanship by-election. Prior to the by-election, Yao proposed lifting requirements on chairmanship candidates that mandated prior service on the KMT's Central Standing, Central Evaluation, and Disciplinary Committees. After the party's first elected chairwoman Hung Hsiu-chu named Ministry of Justice Investigation Bureau administrator Mo Tien-hu as Kuomintang secretary-general, Yao expressed concern about Mo's lack of experience working within the party. He also proposed that the Kuomintang begin directly electing local party leaders. When the KMT's full-term 2017 chairmanship election was being scheduled, Yao filed a lawsuit against Hung, who supported moving the election date forward by two months, an idea she stated Yao himself had originally proposed. During the transition period from Hung to Wu Den-yih, Yao served as a negotiator and helped broker an agreement to postpone Central Committee and Central Standing Committee elections until Wu had been inaugurated as chair. After the Kuomintang won the 2018 local elections, Yao proposed that KMT heads of local governments be seated by default to the party's Central Executive Committee. The following year, Yao discussed scheduling the Kuomintang presidential primary, comments made by Yang Chiu-hsing about the party's eventual nominee, Han Kuo-yu, and the political future of Terry Gou, who had placed second in the primary. Yao later joined the Han campaign as a deputy director-general, alongside William Tseng. During the 2021 Kuomintang chairmanship election, Yao served as an electoral committee representative of former chair Eric Chu, who won reelection to a non-consecutive term as party leader.

Yao died on 9 January 2026, at the age of 75.
