= Lin Junq-tzer =

Taiwanese politician (born 1944)

- 林政則
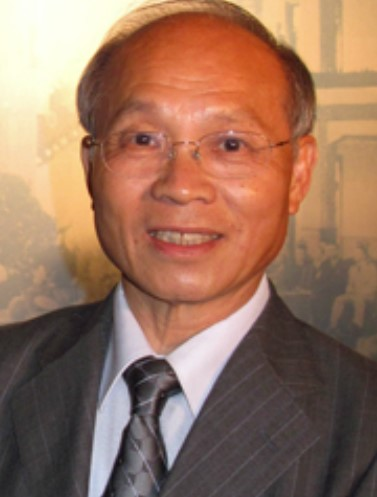
- Lin in 2011

Acting Chairman of the Kuomintang
- In office 1 July 2017 – 20 August 2017
- Secretary General: Tseng Yung-chuan
- Preceded by: Hung Hsiu-chu
- Succeeded by: Wu Den-yih

Vice Chairman of the Kuomintang
- In office 18 May 2016 – 19 August 2017 Serving with Steve Chan, Chen Chen-hsiang, Hau Lung-pin and Jason Hu
- Chairperson: Hung Hsiu-chu; Himself (acting)

22nd Chairman of the Provincial Government and Minister without Portfolio (Note: Titled as chairman of the Taiwan Provincial Government; as a governor that was appointed by the Executive Yuan.)
- In office 24 February 2010 – 20 May 2016
- Appointed by: Executive Yuan
- Prime Minister: See list: Wu Den-yih Sean Chen Jiang Yi-huah Mao Chi-kuo Simon Chang
- Preceded by: Chang Jin-fu
- Succeeded by: Shih Jun-ji

5th Mayor of Hsinchu
- In office 20 December 2001 – 20 December 2009
- Preceded by: James Tsai
- Succeeded by: Hsu Ming-tsai

Member of the Legislative Yuan
- In office 1 February 1996 – 20 December 2001
- Preceded by: Hsieh Chi-ta
- Succeeded by: Lu Hsueh-chang
- Constituency: Hsinchu

Personal details
- Born: 5 February 1944 (age 82) Hsinchu, Japanese Taiwan
- Party: Kuomintang
- Education: Soochow University (BA); National University (MS)

Lin Junq-tzer (Chinese: 林政則; pinyin: Lín Zhèngzé; Pe̍h-ōe-jī: Lîm Chèng-chek; born 1944) is a Taiwanese politician who has served as the appointed governor of Taiwan Provincial Government from 26 February 2010 to 20 May 2016.

== Early life and education ==
A Hakka born in Hsinchu, Lin earned his bachelor's degree in business administration from Soochow University in 1967 and a master's degree in educational administration in 1989.

== Early career ==
After finishing his bachelor's degree from Soochow University, Lin taught as a teacher at Zhudong Junior High School in Hsinchu County in 1968-1969.

== Early political career ==
On 23 December 1972, Lin joined the legislative election and won a member seat at Hsinchu County Council. In 1981, he became the delegate for National Assembly.

== Hsinchu City Mayor ==
Lin was elected as the Mayor of Hsinchu City after winning the 2001 Republic of China local election under Kuomintang on 1 December 2001 and took office on 20 December 2001.

2001 Hsinchu City Mayoral Election Result
| No. | Party | Candidate | Votes | Ratio |
|---|---|---|---|---|
| 1 | Democratic Progressive Party | Tsai Jen-chien (蔡仁堅) | 69,165 | 42.77% |
| 2 | Independent | Wang Shao-chuan (王少泉) | 801 | 0.50% |
| 3 | Kuomintang | Lin Junq-tzer (林政則) | 90,580 | 56.01% |
| 4 | Independent | Huang Chung-mei (黃中媄) | 1,171 | 0.72% |

He was then re-elected by a near 40% margin as the mayor after winning the 2005 Republic of China local election on 3 December 2005 and took office on 20 December 2005.

2005 Hsinchu City Mayoral Election Result
| No. | Party | Candidate | Votes | Ratio |
|---|---|---|---|---|
| 1 | Democratic Progressive Party | Cheng Kuei-yuan (鄭貴元) | 49,777 | 30.73% |
| 2 | Kuomintang | Lin Junq-tzer (林政則) | 112,221 | 69.27% |

== Notes ==
Party political offices
| Preceded by Hung Hsiu-chu | Chairman of the Kuomintang; Acting; 2017 | Succeeded by Wu Den-yih |
