= 2016 Taiwanese general election =

2016 election in Taiwan

- 16 January 2016
- Presidential election
- Turnout: 66.27% (▼8.11pp)
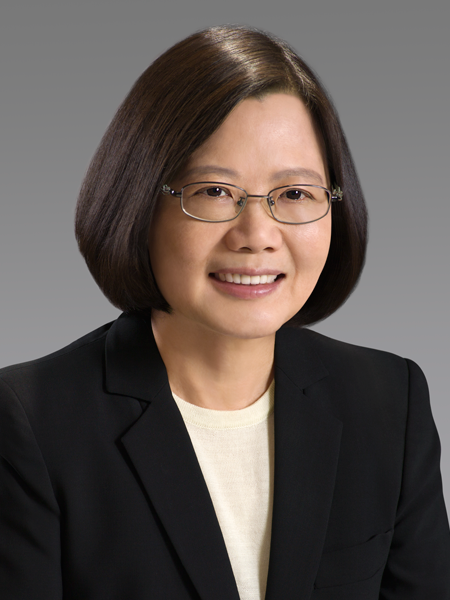

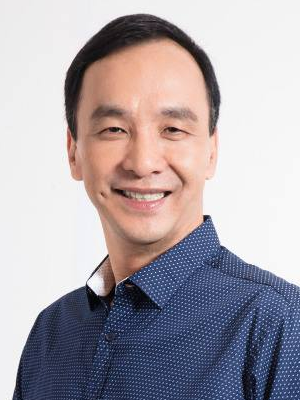

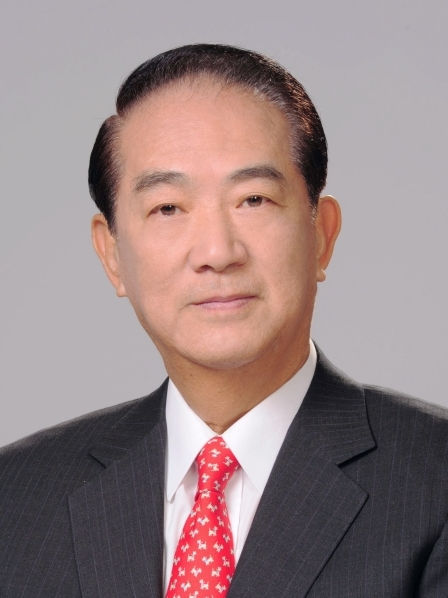
Nominee	Tsai Ing-wen	Eric Chu	James Soong
Party	DPP	KMT	People First
Running mate	Chen Chien-jen	Wang Ju-hsuan	Hsu Hsin-ying
Popular vote	6,894,744	3,813,365	1,576,861
Percentage	56.12%	31.04%	12.84%
President before election
Ma Ying-jeou
KMT
Elected President
Tsai Ing-wen
DPP
- Legislative election
- All 113 seats in the Legislative Yuan; 57 seats needed for a majority
- Turnout: 66.25% (▼8.08 pp, party-list); 66.34% (▼8.13 pp, constituency)
Party	Leader	Vote %	Seats	+/–
DPP	Tsai Ing-wen	44.06	68	+28
KMT	Eric Chu	26.91	35	−29
People First	James Soong	6.52	3	0
NPP	Huang Kuo-chang	6.11	5	New
NPSU	Lin Pin-kuan	0.64	1	−1
Independent	–	–	1	0
This lists parties that won seats. See the complete results below.
President of the Legislative Yuan before	President of the Legislative Yuan after
Wang Jin-pyng; KMT	Su Jia-chyuan; DPP

General elections were held in Taiwan, officially the Republic of China, on Saturday, 16 January 2016 to elect the 14th President and Vice President of the Republic of China, and all 113 members of the ninth Legislative Yuan:

== Presidential election ==
The president and vice president election was held in Taiwan on 16 January 2016. Democratic Progressive Party (DPP) candidate Tsai Ing-wen with her independent running mate Chen Chien-jen won over Eric Chu of the Kuomintang (KMT) and James Soong of the People First Party (PFP). Tsai became the first female president in Taiwan, as well as the Chinese-speaking world.

A second-time presidential candidate, Tsai secured the DPP's nomination uncontested as early as February 2015, while KMT candidate Hung Hsiu-chu, who won the party's nomination in July 2015, was trailing behind Tsai by double digits. Alarmed by Hung's perceived pro-Beijing stance, the KMT held an extraordinary party congress to nullify Hung's candidacy in a controversial move, and replaced her by the party chairman Eric Chu, less than a hundred days before the general election. However, Chu did not fare much better than Hung in the polls, and it was almost certain that Tsai was going to win weeks before the election. Veteran politician James Soong also announced his presidential campaign for the fourth time, making the election a three-way contest.

Some 12 million voters, 66% of the total registered voters, cast their votes, the lowest turnout since the office was first directly elected in 1996. Tsai won 6.89 million votes, leading Chu who received 3.81 million votes by 3.08 million votes, becoming the second highest winning margin behind first direct presidential election in 1996. She also won with 56.1%, the second-largest vote share claimed by a presidential candidate since Ma Ying-jeou in the 2008 election. It was the second time the DPP won the presidency since Chen Shui-bian won in 2000. The DPP also won the Legislative Yuan election on the same day, which secured a DPP majority in the legislature.

== Legislative election ==
The Legislative Yuan election was held on 16 January 2016 for all 113 seats to the Legislative Yuan in Taiwan. The Democratic Progressive Party (DPP) led by Tsai Ing-wen, who also won the presidential election on the same day, secured a majority for the first time in history by winning 68 seats. The ruling Kuomintang (KMT), lost both the presidency and the legislature, returned to the opposition.

The DPP managed to unseat the KMT in its traditional blue strongholds across Taiwan, turning districts in Taipei, Taichung and Hualien green, while KMT Vice Chairman Hau Lung-bin conceding defeat to relatively unknown city councillor Tsai Shih-ying from the DPP, becoming one of its biggest loses in the election. The year-old New Power Party (NPP) founded by young activists which emerged from the 2014 Sunflower Movement also fared well to win five seats by defeating some of the KMT veterans.
