= Tina Pan =

Taiwanese political scientist and politician

Pan Wei-kang MLY
- 潘維剛
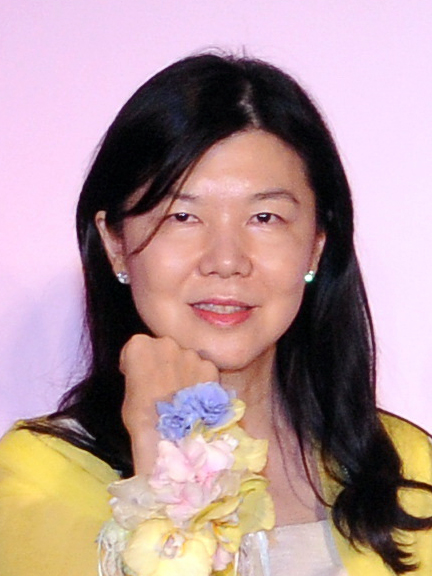
- Pan in 2015

Member of the Legislative Yuan
- In office 1 February 2008 – 31 January 2016
- Constituency: Republic of China
- In office 1 February 2005 – 31 January 2008
- Constituency: Taipei 2
- In office 1 February 1993 – 31 January 2002
- Constituency: Taipei 2 (Taipei South district until 1999)

Personal details
- Born: 31 March 1957 (age 69) Pingtung County, Taiwan
- Party: Kuomintang
- Education: Ming Chuan University (BS); Chinese Culture University (MA); National Taiwan Normal University (PhD); National Chengchi University (MPA)

Pan Wei-kang (Chinese: 潘維剛; pinyin: Pān Wéigāng; born 31 March 1957), also known by her English name Tina Pan, is a Taiwanese political scientist and politician. She was a member of the Legislative Yuan from 1993 to 2002 and again between 2005 and 2016.

== Education ==
Pan graduated from Ming Chuan University with a degree in accounting and statistics and earned a master's degree in social welfare from Chinese Culture University. She then earned her Ph.D. in law and political science at National Taiwan Normal University in 2003 and obtained a Master of Public Affairs (M.P.A.) from National Chengchi University. Her doctoral dissertation was titled, "A policy analysis of the Domestic Violence Prevention Act" (以政策途徑分析我國家庭暴力防治法立法作為).

== Electoral history ==
She served on the Taipei County Council from 1982 to 1993, when she first won election to the Legislative Yuan. Pan ran in the 2001 elections, but lost. She returned to the Legislative Yuan from 2005 to 2016. Having represented Taipei for most of her legislative career, Pan was placed on the Kuomintang proportional representation party list starting in 2007 and again in 2011. She stated in February 2017 that supporters had pushed her to explore a campaign for the Kuomintang leadership election scheduled for May. Pan confirmed her candidacy for the position later that month. She placed sixth in the election, with 2,437 votes.

2017 Kuomintang chairmanship election
No.	Candidate	Party	Votes	Percentage
1	Wu Den-yih	Kuomintang	144,408	52.24%
2	Hung Hsiu-chu	Kuomintang	53,063	19.20%
3	Hau Lung-pin	Kuomintang	44,301	16.03%
4	Han Kuo-yu	Kuomintang	16,141	5.84%
5	Steve Chan	Kuomintang	12,332	4.46%
6	Tina Pan	Kuomintang	2,437	0.88%
Eligible voters			476,147	
Total votes			276,423	
Valid votes			272,682	
Invalid votes			3,741	
Turnout			58.05%	

== Political stances ==
Pan is the longtime chairwoman of the Modern Women's Foundation. She is also active in the National Women’s League. Pan supports a gradual elimination of prostitution in Taiwan, and voted for a 2011 bill legalizing the sex trade in red-light districts so that women who participate in designated areas would not face prosecution. She also backed the Family Proceedings Act, which sought to speed up family law-related court cases to protect women and children. Pan has proposed many amendments to the Sexual Assault Crime Prevention Act and believes that DNA sampling used as evidence for such legal proceedings should be applied to other cases. She views chemical castration as a form of therapy and opposes its proposed inclusion in the Sexual Assault Crime Prevention Act as a punishment.

Pan has worked to expand the rights of immigrants to Taiwan throughout her legislative career. She attempted to lessen the waiting time required for Chinese spouses of Taiwanese nationals to seek permanent residency in Taiwan. She was critical of the Government Information Office which in 2006 researched a ban of soap operas produced in Japan, Korea, China and Hong Kong. In 2014, Pan assisted Joseph Levy, a French citizen who was born in Taiwan, with his application to Taiwan's merchant marine.
