= Vice Chairman of the Kuomintang =

Taiwanese political party position

- 中國國民黨副主席
- Emblem of the Kuomintang

- Flag of the Kuomintang
- Central Committee of the Kuomintang
- Type: Deputy to the party leader
- Reports to: Chairman of the Kuomintang
- Nominator: Chairman of the Kuomintang
- Appointer: National Congress
- Term length: Until the next chairman takes office
- Formation: 13 August 1993; 33 years ago

The vice chairman of the Kuomintang is the deputy to the chairman of the Kuomintang. The vice chairman is also an ex officio attendee of the National Congress, the plenary session of the Central Committee and the meeting of the Central Standing Committee.

On August 18, 1993, the 14th National Congress of the Kuomintang passed an amendment to the Kuomintang Constitution, adding “a number of vice chairmen” to be nominated by the chairman and appointed with the approval of the National Congress. On September 6, 2020, the provisions on vice chairmen in the Kuomintang Constitution were changed from “must appoint a vice chairman” to “may appoint a vice-chairman”, allowing the chairman not to appoint a vice chairman.

== List ==
=== Vice Chairman of the Central Executive Committee (1935–1938) ===
Order	Portrait	Name	Term of Office	
1		Chiang Kai-shek	7 December 1935	1 April 1938

=== Vice Directors-General (1938–1939; 1957–1965) ===
Order	Portrait	Name	Term of Office	
2		Wang Jingwei	1 April 1938	1 January 1939
3		Chen Cheng	23 October 1957	5 March 1965 (Died in office)

=== Vice Chairmen (from 1993) ===
Term	Portrait	Name	Term of Office		Notes
4		Lee Yuan-tsu	18 August 1993	27 August 1997	
4		Lee Yuan-tsu	27 August 1997	18 June 2000	
4		Hau Pei-tsun	18 August 1993	14 December 1995	Expelled by the party in 1995 for an independent presidential campaign. Returned in 2005.
4		Lin Yang-kang	18 August 1993	14 December 1995	Expelled by the party in 1995 for an independent presidential campaign. Returned in 2005.
4		Lien Chan	18 August 1993	27 August 1997	As Premier of the Executive Yuan (1993–1997), Vice President (1996–2000).; Senior Vice Chair
4		Lien Chan	27 August 1997	18 June 2000	As Vice President (1996–2000), 2000 Kuomintang presidential nominee.; Senior Vice Chair; Acting Chair (24 March – 18 June 2000)
5		Yu Kuo-hwa	27 August 1997	18 June 2000	
5		Yu Kuo-hwa	18 June 2000	4 October 2000	(Died in post)
5		Chiu Chuang-huan	27 August 1997	18 June 2000	
6		Chiang Pin-kung	30 March 2000	30 March 2003	Senior Vice Chair
6		Chiang Pin-kung	30 March 2003	19 August 2005	Senior Vice Chair
6		Chiang Pin-kung	19 August 2005	27 February 2007	Senior Vice Chair; Acting Chair (14 March – 11 April 2007)
6		Chiang Pin-kung	27 February 2007	17 October 2009	Senior Vice Chair
6		Chiang Pin-kung	17 October 2009	19 September 2012	Senior Vice Chair
7		Vincent Siew Siew Wan-chang	18 June 2000	29 July 2001	
7		Vincent Siew Siew Wan-chang	29 July 2001	23 March 2005	
7		Wang Jin-pyng	18 June 2000	29 July 2001	As President of the Legislative Yuan.
7		Wang Jin-pyng	29 July 2001	19 August 2005	As President of the Legislative Yuan.
7		Chiang Chung-ling	18 June 2000	29 July 2001	
7		Chiang Chung-ling	29 July 2001	30 March 2003	
7		Wu Po-hsiung	18 June 2000	29 July 2001	Acting Chair (13 February – 14 March 2007)
7		Wu Po-hsiung	29 July 2001	19 August 2005	
7		Wu Po-hsiung	19 August 2005	11 April 2007	
7		Helen Lin Lin Cheng-chih	18 June 2000	29 July 2001	
7		Helen Lin Lin Cheng-chih	29 July 2001	19 August 2005	
7		Helen Lin Lin Cheng-chih	19 August 2005	19 April 2006	
8		Ma Ying-jeou	30 March 2003	19 August 2005	As Mayor of Taipei City.
9		John Kuan Kuan Chung	19 August 2005	22 November 2008	
10		Lin Yi-shih	12 April 2006	24 January 2008	
10		Chang Jen-hsiang	19 April 2006	20 May 2008	
11		Chan Chun-po	12 January 2007	17 October 2009	
11		Chan Chun-po	17 October 2009	30 April 2014	
11		Lin Fong-cheng	11 April 2007	17 October 2009	
11		Lin Fong-cheng	17 October 2009	30 April 2014	
12		John Chiang Chiang Hsiao-yen	22 November 2008	17 October 2009	
12		John Chiang Chiang Hsiao-yen	17 October 2009	30 April 2014	
12		Wu Den-yih	22 November 2008	17 October 2009	
12		Wu Den-yih	4 June 2014	19 January 2015	As Vice President.; Senior Vice Chair
12		Tseng Yung-chuan	22 November 2008	17 October 2009	Senior Vice Chair
12		Tseng Yung-chuan	17 October 2009	15 February 2012	Senior Vice Chair
12		Tseng Yung-chuan	15 February 2012	19 January 2015	Senior Vice Chair (until 4 June 2014)
12		Tseng Yung-chuan	20 August 2017	15 January 2020	Senior Vice Chair
12		Eric Chu Chu Li-luan	22 November 2008	17 October 2009	
12		Eric Chu Chu Li-luan	26 May 2010	23 December 2010	
12		Eric Chu Chu Li-luan	30 April 2014	19 January 2015	As Mayor of New Taipei City.
12		Huang Min-hui	22 November 2008	17 October 2009	
12		Huang Min-hui	17 October 2009	16 January 2016	
12		Huang Min-hui	30 October 2021	Incumbent	Senior Vice Chair
13		Hung Hsiu-chu	15 February 2012	19 January 2015	
14		Jason Hu Hu Chih-chiang	30 April 2014	19 January 2015	
14		Jason Hu Hu Chih-chiang	18 May 2016	30 June 2017	
14		Hau Lung-pin	30 April 2014	16 January 2016	Senior Vice Chair
14		Hau Lung-pin	18 May 2016	30 June 2017	
14		Hau Lung-pin	20 August 2017	15 January 2020	
15		Lin Junq-tzer	18 May 2016	30 June 2017	
16		Steve Chan Chan Chi-hsien	15 June 2016	7 January 2017	Senior Vice Chair
17		Chen Chen-hsiang	23 November 2016	30 June 2017	
18		Andrew Hsia	30 October 2021	Incumbent	
18		Sean Lien	30 October 2021	Incumbent	
