= JAAF =

JAAF is a four-letter abbreviation which may refer to:

- Japanese Army Air Force
- Japan Association of Athletics Federations
- Journal of Accounting, Auditing and Finance

== See also ==
- Jaff tribe
