= Timothy Ting =

Ting Ting-yu
- 丁庭宇

Deputy Mayor of Taipei
- In office 15 August 2011 – 25 December 2014 Serving with Chen Hsiung-wen, Chang Chin-oh
- Appointed by: Hau Lung-pin (mayor)

Personal details
- Born: 1954 (age 70–71)
- Citizenship: Republic of China
- Education: National Taiwan University (BA); University of Michigan (PhD)
- Scientific career
- Fields: Sociology
- Thesis: The transition of family limitation practice in Taiwan, 1961-1980: an areal-unit analysis (1983)
- Doctoral advisor: Albert Hermalin; Ronald Freedman

Ting Ting-yu (Chinese: 丁庭宇; pinyin: Dīng Tíngyǔ; born 1954), known also by his English name Timothy Ting, is a Taiwanese sociologist and politician.

== Education ==
Ting graduated from National Taiwan University (NTU) with a bachelor's degree in sociology, then completed doctoral studies in the United States, where he earned his Ph.D. in sociology from the University of Michigan in 1983 under sociology professors Albert Hermalin and Ronald Freedman. His doctoral dissertation was titled, "The transition of family limitation practice in Taiwan, 1961–1980: an areal-unit analysis".

== In academia and business ==
Ting served as an assistant professor of sociology at Kansas State University before returning to Taiwan, where he successively took up associate professorships at National Chengchi University and his alma mater NTU. In 1997 he left his post at NTU to work in the opinion polling industry. He eventually began working for Gallup Taiwan, a research organisation. In a 2006 letter to the Taipei Times, a spokesperson for the U.S.-based Gallup denied any association with Ting or his company.

== As deputy mayor of Taipei ==
Ting was appointed third deputy mayor of Taipei by Hau Lung-pin in August 2011. His financial declaration at the time he took office showed that he owned investment properties in a number of cities. These included four in Shanghai and Beijing, making him the public official with the largest number of properties in mainland China. During his time in office, one issue to which he turned his focus was urban renewal; he stated that Taipei was at a disadvantage compared to other major cities in Asia such as Hong Kong, Beijing, and Shanghai due to its age, having been mostly constructed in the 1960s and 1970s. In October 2013, he visited Wuhan, Hubei as part of an official delegation during Hubei province's "Taiwan Week" in an effort to encourage companies there to invest in Taiwan.

== Personal life ==
Ting has a son and a daughter. He sent them to Lincoln, Nebraska, for their education in the 1990s.
