= 2016 Taiwanese presidential election =

- 16 January 2016
- Registered: 18,782,991
- Turnout: 66.27% (▼8.11pp)
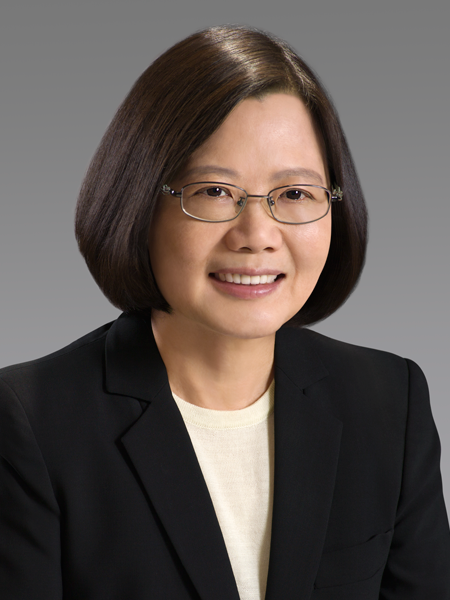

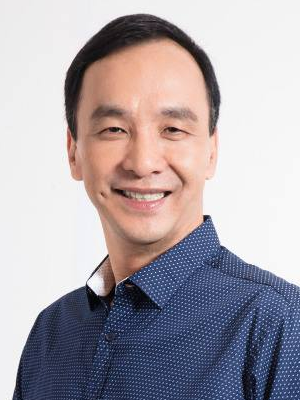

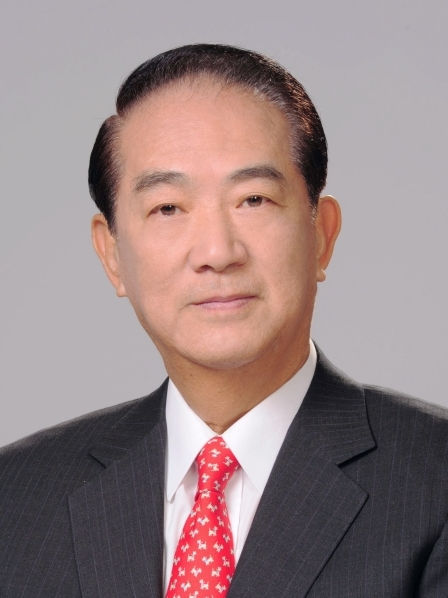
Nominee	Tsai Ing-wen	Eric Chu	James Soong
Party	DPP	KMT	People First
Running mate	Chen Chien-jen	Wang Ju-hsuan	Hsu Hsin-ying
Popular vote	6,894,744	3,813,365	1,576,861
Percentage	56.12%	31.04%	12.84%
President before election
Ma Ying-jeou
KMT
Elected President
Tsai Ing-wen
DPP

Presidential elections were held in Taiwan on 16 January 2016. Democratic Progressive Party (DPP) candidate Tsai Ing-wen with her independent running mate Chen Chien-jen won over Eric Chu of the Kuomintang (KMT) and James Soong of the People First Party (PFP). Tsai became the first female president in Taiwan, as well as in the Chinese-speaking world.

A second time presidential candidate, Tsai secured the DPP's nomination uncontested as early as February 2015, while KMT candidate Hung Hsiu-chu who won the party's nomination in July 2015, was trailing behind Tsai by double digits. Alarmed by Hung's perceived pro-Beijing stance, the KMT held a special party congress to nullify Hung's candidacy in a controversial move, and replaced her with the party chairman Eric Chu, less than a hundred days before the general election. However, Chu did not fare much better than Hung in the polls, and it was almost certain that Tsai was going to win weeks before the election. Veteran politician James Soong also announced his presidential campaign for the fourth time, making the election a three-way contest.

Some 12 million voters, 66% of the total registered voters, cast their votes; this was the lowest turnout since the office was first directly elected in 1996. Tsai won 6.89 million votes, leading Chu, who received 3.81 million votes, by 3.08 million votes. The vote difference became the second highest winning margin since the first direct presidential election in 1996. Tsai also won with 56.1%, the second-largest vote share claimed by a presidential candidate since Ma Ying-jeou in the 2008 election. It was the second time the DPP won the presidency since Chen Shui-bian's victory in 2000. The DPP also won the Legislative Yuan election held on the same day, which secured a DPP majority in the legislature.

== Background ==
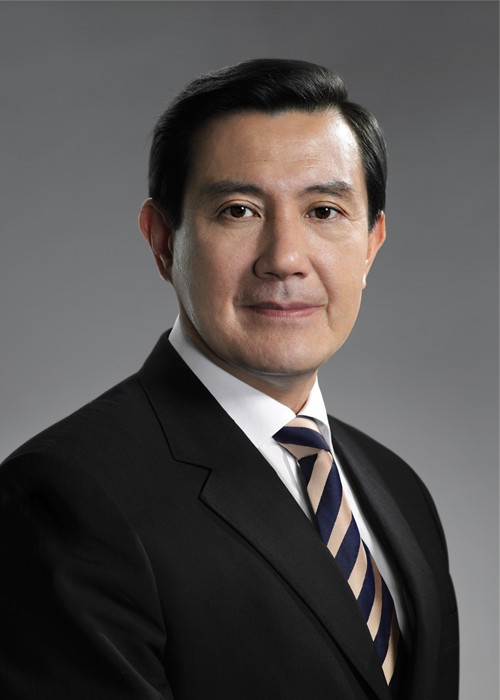
Ma Ying-jeou, the incumbent President of the Republic of China was ineligible to seek re-election after serving two consecutive terms.

Presidential candidates and vice-presidential running mates are elected on the same ticket, using first-past-the-post. Due to constitutional two-term limits, incumbent president Ma Ying-jeou of Kuomintang was ineligible to seek re-election. It was the 14th election of the president of the Republic of China since the 1947 Constitution and the sixth direct election by the citizens of Taiwan, which was previously indirectly elected by the National Assembly prior to 1996.

Ma Ying-jeou of Kuomintang was elected to a second term after defeating Tsai Ing-wen of the Democratic Progressive Party in the 2012 presidential election with nearly six million votes. However, the Ma presidency was overshadowed by the historic Sunflower Movement student protest in 2014 against the Cross-Strait Service Trade Agreement (CSSTA) in which 500,000 protesters were mobilized and the Legislative Yuan was occupied by the protesters for the first time in history.

The ruling Kuomintang suffered a historic defeat in the following municipal elections in November 2014, in which the Kuomintang lost nine of the 15 mayorships it previously held. Other anti-government movements such as the White Shirt Army, a mass protest following the death of army conscript Hung Chung-chiu, and also the High School Edition protest, also hammered the credibility of the Ma government.

== Nominations ==
=== Democratic Progressive Party ===
According to internal party protocols, presidential primaries are conducted via nationwide opinion polling. Registration for the primary was held between 2 and 16 February 2015. After all other likely DPP candidates- Mayor of Kaohsiung Chen Chu, Mayor of Tainan Lai Ching-te and former premier Su Tseng-chang, declined to run, the candidacy for the 2012 presidential office was left open for Tsai Ing-wen, the incumbent DPP chairwoman at the time and former Vice Premier. Tsai became the only candidate who registered in February 2015, and thus nationwide opinion polling that was planned to be conducted between 16 and 18 March was suspended. Tsai was duly nominated by the DPP on 15 April 2015. On 16 November 2015, Tsai Ing-wen announced former Minister of Health Chen Chien-jen as her running mate, who consequently resigned from his post as deputy director of Academia Sinica.

==== Democratic Progressive nominees ====
2016 Democratic Progressive ticket
Tsai Ing-wen	Chen Chien-jen
for President	for Vice President
Vice President of the Executive Yuan (2006–2007)	Minister of Health (2003–2005)

=== Kuomintang ===
After the landslide defeat in the municipal elections, many Kuomintang heavyweights including Vice President Wu Den-yih, President of the Legislative Yuan Wang Jin-pyng and the party chairman Eric Chu decided not to run in the race. The field was left open to Hung Hsiu-chu, the incumbent vice president of the Legislative Yuan who was also a legislator for eight consecutive terms since 1989.

According to internal party protocols, presidential primaries are conducted via a combination of party member vote with 30% weighting, and nationwide opinion polling with 70% weighting. Registration and petitions were conducted between 20 April to 18 May 2015. Two candidates, including Hung Hsiu-chu; and Yang Chih-liang, former minister of health, registered. Hung garnered 35,210 signatories in her petition, crossing the eligibility threshold of 15,000 signatories; while Yang garnered only 5,234 signatories, nullifying his candidacy. The party member vote was suspended because Hung was the only eligible candidate. Nationwide opinion polling were conducted from 12 to 13 June 2015; with equal weighting between approval rating and general election polling. Hung garnered an average of 46.20% in the nationwide polling, crossing the eligibility threshold of 30%, and was nominated unopposedly by the party congress on 19 July 2015.

However Hung's remarks on the Cross-Strait policy sparked fears over her perceived pro-unification stance which alienated some in her own party, taking a more moderate line, as she had advocated unification with the mainland but was recently stopped by senior party members, as most on the island prefer the status quo. In addition, Hung was still trailing Democratic Progressive Party candidate Tsai Ing-wen in the polls by double digits. Tsai is consistently showing 40–50 percent support in the polls, while Hung's numbers are closer to those of third-party candidates James Soong. One poll had Tsai at 45 percent support and Hung at only 12 percent. The poor showing in the polls alarmed the senior party members.

According to the reports from CNA, Eric Chu, the incumbent KMT chairman and Mayor of New Taipei, had privately urged Hung to step aside and allow another candidate to run, most likely Chu himself. In October 2015, Hung cited that Republic of China Constitution calls for "ultimate unification with China," although she added "be it in 50 years or 100 years." Eric Chu publicly responded by saying Hung's policy deviated from the mainstream and that the party has decided to call an extempore congress to consider a new candidate.

On 17 October, an extraordinary KMT party congress was called. The delegates voted overwhelmingly to nullify Hung Hsiu-chu's nomination. The congress also selected Chu to replace Hung as the presidential candidate of the KMT. On 18 November Chu selected Wang Ju-hsuan as his running mate, who had a background as a human rights lawyer and former minister of Council of Labor Affairs.

==== Kuomintang nominees ====
2016 Kuomintang ticket
Eric Chu	Wang Ju-hsuan
for President	for Vice President
Mayor of New Taipei (2010–2018)	Minister of Council of Labor Affairs (2008–2012)

==== Nullified nominee ====
Hung Hsiu-chu

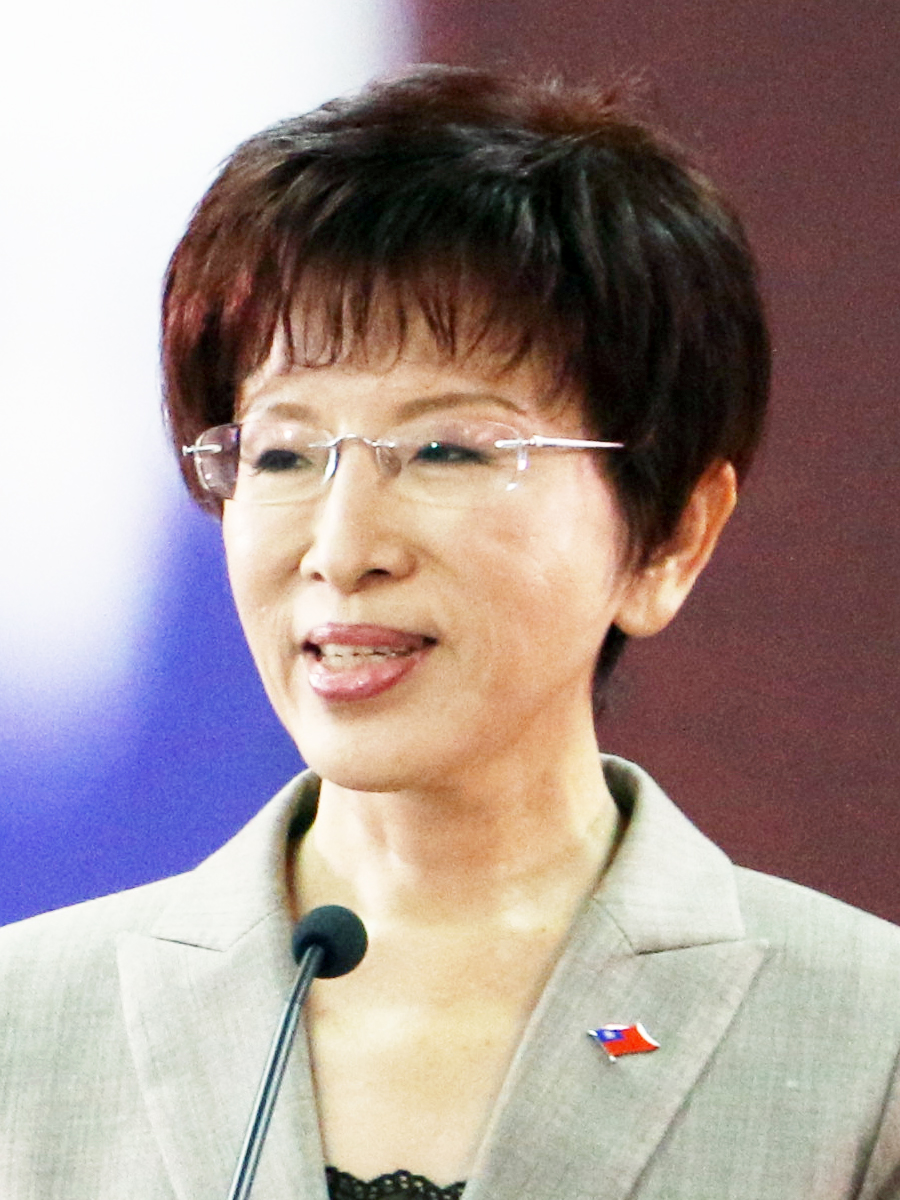

Vice President of the
Legislative Yuan
(2012–2016)
Nominated: 19 July 2015
Nullified: 17 October 2015

=== People First Party ===
James Soong, Chairman of the People First Party (PFP) also announced his presidential candidacy on 6 August 2015, making it his fourth presidential bid after 2000, 2004 and 2012 elections. On 18 November 2015, Soong announced Minkuotang (MKT) chairwoman and legislator Hsu Hsin-ying as his running mate. The PFP–MKT coalition became the first pair of candidates to register for the election on 23 November 2015.

==== People First nominees ====
2016 People First ticket
James Soong	Hsu Hsin-ying
for President	for Vice President
Governor of Taiwan Province (1993–1998)	Member of the Legislative Yuan (2012–2016)

=== Other candidates ===
According to article 22 of the President and Vice President Election and Recall Act, presidential and vice presidential candidates not nominated by an eligible political party may qualify via a petition signed by at least 1.5% of the number of eligible voters during the preceding legislative election: a threshold of 269,709 eligible voters.

- Nori Shih, former legislator and chair of the Democratic Progressive Party, declared his candidature on 21 May 2015. However, due to the failure to collect sufficient signatories on his petition, he withdrew his candidacy on 16 September 2015.
- Hsu Jung-shu, chair of the People United Party, and former legislator of the Democratic Progressive Party, declared her candidature on 7 July 2015, and received support from the Taiwan Progressive Party, National Health Service Alliance, and Zhongshan Party. However, despite initially registering at the central election commission, Hsu and her running mate, Hsia Han-ren did not submit their petition, thus nullifying their candidacy.
- Chang Dong-shan, chair of the Grand Union of National Happiness, and running mate, Lin Li-rong, chair of the Positive Party, initially registered at the central election commission, but collected only 72 signatures thus nullifying their candidacy.
- Independent candidates Lan Hsin-kei and Chu Hsu-fang, also registered at the central election commission, but did not submit their petition.
- Music professor Lin You-hsiang and running mate, Hung Mei-chen were endorsed by the Union of Taiwanese Party Chairs, and initially registered at the central election commission, but also failed to submit their petition.

== General election campaign ==
After the controversial move of the KMT replacing Hung Hsiu-chu with Eric Chu as the presidential candidate less than 100 days before the 16 January general election, the poll still showed Chu trailing behind DPP candidate Tsai Ing-wen and was predicted to certainly lose. Critics said Chu over-thought his strategy and threw his hat in the ring when it was too late and being too close to the unpopular incumbent president Ma Ying-jeou. Furthermore, Chu's running mate, vice presidential candidate Wang Ju-hsuan was mired in series of scandals, such as proposing unpaid leave, suing laid-off workers, and the "22K policy" which was blamed for decreasing young people's wages during her tenure as Minister of the Council of Labor Affairs, in addition to the ethical debate over her purchase of military housing.

Like Ma, Chu put economic growth at the top of his agenda. Chu advocated for building stronger economic ties with China, seeing that as crucial to lifting Taiwan's economy out of isolation. He also said he would work to further Taiwan's objective of participating in regional integration initiatives such as the Trans-Pacific Partnership (TPP) and Regional Comprehensive Economic Partnership. Chu also proposed a "three strategy plan," a highlight of which is to dramatically raise basic wages from $20,008 new Taiwan dollars (NT) to NT $30,000 over four years.

With regard to relations with mainland China, Chu said he would be in line with his party's policy to continue to promote the development of cross-strait ties on the basis of the "1992 Consensus," in which both sides insist there is "one China" but agree to disagree on what this means. He attacked Tsai for her "vague policies", especially her approach to cross-strait relations as Tsai refused to accept Beijing's precondition that she first accept that Taiwan is a part of "one China". However, Tsai had moderated her party's pro-independence stance and promised to maintain peaceful and stable relations and expressed her openness to dialogues with the Beijing government. She stressed the importance of maintaining the status quo "in accordance with the will of the Taiwanese people and the existing ROC constitutional order." On the other hand, Tsai pledged to promote greater spending on indigenous defense programs, including research and development, in order to meet the nation's long-term defense needs.

On the domestic issues, Tsai called for comprehensive reform in areas such as bureaucratic efficiency, the education system, fiscal policy and regional development. She said that, above all, the country must establish a government that "puts the people first" and the "fruits of economic success should be shared fairly among all citizens." She pledged to solve the problem of unemployment rate, weak economic growth, an unequal distribution of wealth and impeding upward mobility.

Capitalizing on the unpopularity of the KMT's Chu-Wang ticket, James Soong, the third-party candidate of the PFP stressed that he would seek a cross-party cooperation on sharing power if elected and sought a middle path that would bridge the blue-green divide. According to the most recent surveys, is polling at about 14%, or just five percentage point behind the KMT.

The First Ma–Xi meeting in November 2015 between Taiwanese president Ma Ying-jeou and Chinese paramount leader Xi Jinping in Singapore provided little political benefit to the KMT, affirming how most Taiwanese do not view closer relations with China to be beneficial to Taiwan.

== Debates ==
Debates among candidates for the 2016 presidential election
No.	Date	Time	Host	Participants
1	26 December 2015	2 p.m.	SET News	Chen Chien-jen; Wang Ju-hsuan; Hsu Hsin-ying
2	27 December 2015	2 p.m.	Public Television Service	Tsai Ing-wen; Eric Chu; James Soong
3	2 January 2016	2 p.m.	SET News	Tsai Ing-wen; Eric Chu; James Soong

== Opinion polls ==
Local regression of polls conducted since 2015

Polling organisation	Date(s) administered	Eric Chu KMT	Tsai Ing-wen DPP	James Soong PFP	Undecided
Nationwide
Decision Making Research	24 August 2015	25.5%	41.2%	15.0%	18.3%
Kuomintang	14 September 2015	33%	43%	13%	11%
Apple Daily	6 October 2015	29.28%	40.92%	15.07%	14.73%
Television Broadcasts Satellite	7 October 2015	29%	48%	10%	13%
Decision Making Research	7 October 2015	19.0%	42.1%	14.1%	24.8%
Taiwan Indicators Survey Research	13 October 2015	21.0%	44.6%	12.0%	22.4%
Apple Daily	16 October 2015	26.23%	45.47%	12.63%	15.67%
Fades Survey Research	16 October 2015	17.17%	40.18%	22.39%	17.72%
Liberty Times	17 October 2015	18.91%	47.04%	7.86%	26.19%
Decision Making Research	17 October 2015	21.9%	45.2%	13.8%	19.1%
Trend Survey Research	17 October 2015	20.7%	41.6%	10.1%	27.6%
TVBS	19 October 2015	29%	46%	10%	15%
China Times	22 October 2015	21.8%	38.9%	8.8%	30.5%
People First Party	24 October 2015	17%	40%	23%	20%
Taiwan Indicators Survey Research	12 November 2015	20.4%	46.2%	10.4%	13%
Shih Hsin University Research	27 November 2015	18.4%	44.5%	6.8%	30.3%
SET News	6 December 2015	15.7%	44.9%	13.7%	25.7%
TVBS	13 December 2015	22%	45%	10%	23%
New Taipei City
Television Broadcasts Satellite	15 October 2015	31%	47%	14%	7%
New Taipei City 6th Constituency
Next Television	21 October 2015	20.9%	49.8%	8.1%	21.2%
Hsinchu City
Focus Survey Research	20 October 2015	21.0%	46.7%	12.9%	19.4%
Taichung City
Kuomintang	15 October 2015	12.8%	41.4%	8.4%	37.4%

== Chou Tzu-yu flag incident ==
On 15 January 2016, one day before the election, Chou Tzu-yu, a 16-year-old Taiwanese singer and a member of the South Korean K-pop girl group Twice, attracted attention with her appearance in a South Korean variety show called My Little Television, in which she introduced herself as Taiwanese and waved the flag of the Republic of China alongside that of South Korea. Japan's flag was also shown as the other members of the group represented their nationality throughout the show. However, soon after the episode was broadcast it sparked controversy in China when Taiwanese-born China-based singer Huang An accused Chou of being a "pro-Taiwanese independence activist". After the uproar over the issue, the group's record label, JYP Entertainment cancelled all activities of the group in China and released a video where Chou is shown reading an apology, all this the day before the election. She mentioned in part:

"There is only one China. The two sides of the [Taiwan] Strait are one entity. I feel proud being a Chinese. I, as a Chinese, have hurt the company and netizens' feelings due to my words and actions during overseas promotions. I feel very, very sorry and also very guilty."

Nevertheless, critics saw her apology as "humiliating and a sign of Taiwan's predicament that Chou had to apologize for expressing her Taiwanese identity and for showing her nation's flag." Tsai in her victory speech also mentioned how it had "angered many Taiwanese people, regardless of their political affiliation." And although it was believed by many that this incident affected the election, contributing to one or two percentage points of Tsai's winning margin, it was thought that the issue probably had a very minor impact on the final outcome since most believed that people would have voted for Tsai anyway.

== Results ==
Results of the 2016 Taiwanese presidential election
Candidate	Running mate	Party	Votes	%
Tsai Ing-wen	Chen Chien-jen	Democratic Progressive Party	6,894,744	56.12
Eric Chu	Wang Ju-hsuan	Kuomintang	3,813,365	31.04
James Soong	Hsu Hsin-ying	People First Party	1,576,861	12.84
Total			12,284,970	100.00
Valid votes			12,284,970	98.69
Invalid/blank votes			163,332	1.31
Total votes			12,448,302	100.00
Registered voters/turnout			18,782,991	66.27
Source: CEC

=== By administrative division ===
Subdivision	Electorate	1		2		3		Invalid	Turnout	Margin
Subdivision	Electorate	Eric Chu		Tsai Ing-wen		James Soong		Invalid	Turnout	Margin
Subdivision	Electorate	Wang Ju-hsuan		Chen Chien-jen		Hsu Hsin-ying		Invalid	Turnout	Margin
Subdivision	Electorate	Votes	%	Votes	%	Votes	%	Invalid	Turnout	Margin
Taipei City	2,175,986	546,491	37.49%	757,383	51.96%	153,804	10.55%	22,540	68.03%	210,892
New Taipei City	3,204,367	709,374	33.34%	1,165,888	54.79%	252,486	11.87%	26,481	67.23%	456,514
Keelung City	306,548	68,357	35.29%	93,402	48.22%	31,955	16.49%	2,432	63.99%	25,045
Yilan County	369,211	59,216	25.38%	144,798	62.06%	29,288	12.56%	3,188	64.05%	85,582
Taoyuan City	1,627,598	369,013	34.39%	547,573	51.03%	156,518	14.58%	11,898	66.66%	178,560
Hsinchu County	412,731	94,603	35.28%	114,023	42.52%	59,510	22.20%	3,803	65.89%	19,420
Hsinchu City	328,580	71,771	32.42%	113,386	51.22%	36,198	16.35%	3,138	68.32%	41,615
Miaoli County	448,520	107,779	37.55%	130,461	45.45%	48,788	17.00%	3,652	64.81%	22,682
Taichung City	2,138,519	430,005	29.82%	793,281	55.01%	218,810	15.17%	19,800	68.36%	363,276
Changhua County	1,022,962	193,117	28.80%	378,736	56.47%	98,807	14.73%	10,921	66.63%	185,619
Nantou County	415,122	83,604	32.08%	136,104	52.23%	40,868	15.69%	3,649	63.65%	52,500
Yunlin County	566,207	86,047	24.93%	218,842	63.41%	40,236	11.66%	4,997	61.84%	132,795
Chiayi County	430,885	65,425	23.38%	182,913	65.37%	31,469	11.25%	4,295	65.93%	117,488
Chiayi City	210,758	38,822	27.95%	83,143	59.86%	16,926	12.19%	1,492	66.61%	44,321
Tainan City	1,528,246	219,196	22.07%	670,608	67.52%	103,432	10.41%	12,457	65.81%	451,412
Kaohsiung City	2,254,324	391,823	26.00%	955,168	63.39%	159,765	10.61%	18,117	67.64%	563,345
Pingtung County	689,170	121,291	26.99%	285,297	63.49%	42,768	9.52%	5,595	66.01%	164,006
Taitung County	179,547	43,581	44.62%	37,517	38.41%	16,565	16.96%	1,208	55.07%	-6,064
Hualien County	267,862	73,894	47.72%	57,198	36.94%	23,751	15.34%	2,342	58.68%	-16,696
Penghu County	84,222	12,564	29.48%	21,658	50.81%	8,401	19.71%	643	51.37%	9,094
Kinmen County	111,386	24,327	66.10%	6,626	18.00%	5,852	15.90%	599	33.58%	-17,701
Lienchiang County	10,240	3,065	68.60%	739	16.54%	664	14.86%	85	44.46%	-2,326
Source: CEC Overview Table CEC Visual Query

=== Maps ===

Result by County level

Result by Township level

Vote leader and vote share in township-level districts.

Vote leader in county-level districts.

Swing between the two major parties from the previous presidential election.

Winner vote lead over runner-up by township/city or district. (Note: The third-place ticket led in some township-level units.)

Size of lead between the two tickets.

== Aftermath ==
The defeated candidate Eric Chu resigned as the KMT Chairman in his concession speech on the election night. KMT Vice Chairman Hau Lung-bin also announced he was stepping down after his defeat in the legislative election. In the March chairmanship election, the ousted presidential candidate Hung Hsiu-chu was elected as the first female party chair.

Following the electoral defeat of the ruling KMT, the cabinet led by President of the Executive Yuan Mao Chi-kuo resigned en masse immediately. His position was assumed by Vice Premier Simon Chang. President Ma Ying-jeou offered the Democratic Progressive Party (DPP) to form a Cabinet before its president-elect Tsai Ing-wen is sworn in on 20 May, but the offer was rejected by Tsai.

Tsai became the first female president in Taiwan, as well as the Chinese-speaking world when she was sworn in at the Presidential Building on 20 May 2016.

== See also ==
- 2016 Kuomintang chairmanship election
- 2017 Kuomintang chairmanship election
