= Joshua Ronen =

American author, academic, accountant

- Occupations: Editor, author, academic, accountant and researcher
- Awards: Ford Foundation ICAME Fellowship; Abacus Award

Academic background
- Education: Hebrew University of Jerusalem (BA, MS); Stanford University (PhD)

Academic work
- Discipline: Business administration
- Institutions: New York University
- Doctoral students: Eric Chu

Joshua Ronen is an American accountant and academic. He is a professor of accounting at the New York University Stern School of Business, former editor of the Journal of Accounting, Auditing & Finance and co-editor of the Journal of Law, Finance, and Accounting. He has served or is serving on the boards of numerous journals, including the Journal of Accounting Research, The Accounting Review, Accounting, Organization and Society, Management Science, and Journal of Business Research.

Ronen's research focuses on the areas of accounting, finance, economics, capital markets, corporate finance, and auditing. He has published over 150 research articles. Some of his books are Corporate Financial Information for Government Decision Making, Relevant Financial Statements, Smoothing Income Numbers: Objectives, Means, and Implications, Accounting and Financial Globalization and Earnings Management: Emerging Insights in Theory, Practice, and Research.

In 1958, 1964 and 1965, Ronen received scholarly awards from the Hebrew University for high performance.

== Education ==
Ronen graduated in with a bachelor's degree and master's degree in economics from the Hebrew University of Jerusalem in 1959. He completed his CPA degree in accounting from the same university in 1963. He later received his Ph.D. in business administration from Stanford University in 1969. His dissertation was titled, "Some Effects of Sequential Aggregation in Accounting on Decision-making Behavior". His doctoral advisor was Robert K. Jaedicke.

== Career ==
Ronen taught at University of Chicago, Graduate School of Business as an assistant professor from 1969 to 1973. Taking a leave of absence from the University of Chicago, he joined the Faculty of Management Studies and Department of Political Economy, University of Toronto as associate professor from 1972 to 1973. He then joined New York University as director of the Doctoral Program in Accounting in 1973. From 1985 till 1995, he served as the director of Vincent C. Ross Institute of Accounting Research at the Stern School of Business, New York University.

Ronen was the editor-in-chief of the Journal of Accounting, Auditing, and Finance from 1986 till 1994 and later became the co-editor of the Journal of Law, Finance, and Accounting in 2016. Ronen served as associate director of research for the AICPA Accounting Objective Study Group, and in that capacity was intimately involved in formulating the objectives of financial statements which ultimately became part of the Financial Accounting Standards Board Conceptual Framework.

== Research and work ==
Ronen's primary research areas include Transfer Pricing, Managerial Accounting & Agency Theory, Objectives of Financial Statements & the Conceptual Framework, and Income Smoothing. Some of his work also focuses on Entrepreneurship, Auditing & Financial Statements Insurance, Disclosure, Earnings Management, Regulatory Policy, and Financial Accounting.

=== Transfer pricing ===
In his research about the social costs and benefits of transfer pricing, Ronen points out a strong similarity between the problems of dealing with externalities and the intra-firm transfer pricing problem. A solution suggested in his earlier research is applied to the social cost problem. Ronen's research concludes that the information requirements for the administration of such a policy are identical to those arising in the transfer pricing case. Information about the marginal loss and marginal gain resulting from the activities should be obtained and communicated. In particular, low-cost information that firms can produce and communicate consists of the cost to a firm caused by a harmful side activity of another firm and the cost to a firm that can result from either eliminating or reducing the damage inflicted on others by its harmful activity. According to Ronen, this communication should preferably proceed on a systematic basis since changing factors in the environment may affect the loss and the gain curve.

=== Managerial accounting & agency theory ===
In his article titled 'Capacity and Operating Variances: An Ex Post Approach' in 1970, Ronen designed capacity variances to aid in improving decisions about the capacity design and utilization. He investigated the estimation of variances due to deviations between earlier and back point estimates of the relevant cost and demand parameters. An alternative method of generating variances differentiates the capacity and operating decisions based on the decentralization of these decisions. Due to this distinction, one can use variances effectively to decide on optimal capacity. Source of the variance determines if it is an excess of cost over revenue, total revenue, total cost, or contribution margin.

=== Income smoothing ===
In his research paper 'Classificatory Smoothing and Alternative Income Models,' Ronen focused on the role of extraordinary items in the management of income. Smoothing, in this context, is defined as suppressing fluctuations of a part of income that investors consider to be normal for the company. Ronen considers the purpose of smoothing to be the continuity of ordinary income (before extraordinary items) per share. His study detected smoothing behavior by observing the association between income deviations before extraordinary items from their first differences, and extraordinary item deviations from a constant trend or a macro index trend. Two main kinds of smoothing were distinguished, i.e., classificatory smoothing and Non-classificatory smoothing. The study concluded that firms' management classifies potentially extraordinary items to suppress the deviations of ordinary income before extraordinary items.

=== Entrepreneurship ===
Ronen published a research article about The Rise and Decay of Entrepreneurship in 1989. He discussed the entrepreneurial process and stated that a potential entrepreneur inclined novel ventures in the face of uncertainty. The entrepreneur works on capping the downside risk, such as to preserve his survival as an entrepreneur while expecting a large return. Ronen discussed the Prospect theory and the impact of transforming realities. He proposed a model of the entrepreneurial process which focuses on the circumstances affecting entrepreneurial supply rather than on the characteristics of individual entrepreneurs.

=== Auditing & Financial Statements Insurance ===
In 2002, Ronen proposed Policy reforms in the aftermath of accounting scandals. He suggested that the danger of legal liability is not sufficient to diminish the motivation of auditors to do management bidding. The auditors recover the expected cost of lawsuits and other sanctions from the auditees. Such recovery leads to inefficiency in the allocation of risk and resources. Under Ronen's proposal, Companies portray themselves as having higher-quality financial statements by announcing higher limits of insurance coverage and smaller premiums and vice versa. This Financial Statement Insurance (FSI) scheme effectively removes the conflict of interest that became strongly evident in the aftermath of Enron. GAAP and GAAS reforms can reinforce this solution, which can lead to additional indirect benefits.

== Awards and honors ==
- Ford Foundation ICAME Fellowship to selected teachers of Business Management outside the U. S.: 1966-1967, 1967-1968 and 1968-1969
- 2008 - Abacus Award

== Bibliography ==
=== Books ===
- The Objectives of Financial Statements (1973)
- Corporate Financial Information for Government Decision Making (1975)
- Relevant Financial Statements (1978)
- Accounting, A Management Approach, Sixth Edition (1979)
- Smoothing Income Numbers: Objectives, Means, and Implications (1981)
- Off-Balance Sheet Activities (1990)
- Accounting and Financial Globalization (1991)
- Earnings Management: Emerging Insights in Theory, Practice, and Research (2008)
- Accounting and Regulation: New Insights on Governance, Markets, and Institutions (2013)

=== Articles ===
- "Classificatory Smoothing of Income with Extraordinary Items," (co-authored with A. Barnea and S. Sadan), The Accounting Review, January 1976
- "To Fair Value or Not to Fair Value: A Broader Perspective," Abacus, Vol. 44, No.2, 2008, pp. 181–208.
- "Transfer Pricing for Divisional Autonomy," (co-authored with G. McKinney, III), Journal of Accounting Research, Spring 1970
- "An Expectancy Theory Approach to the Motivational Impacts of Budgets," (co-authored with J.L. Livingston), The Accounting Review, October 1975.
- "Some Hypotheses on the Pattern of Management's Informal Disclosures," (co-authored with V. Pastena), Journal of Accounting Research, Autumn 1979.
- "Incentives for Voluntary Disclosure," (co-authored with Varda Yaari), Journal of Financial Markets, 4 (4), 2001, pp. 309–357
- "Some Insights into the Entrepreneurial Process," in Entrepreneurship, ed. Joshua Ronen, Lexington: Lexington Books, 1983.
- "An Approach to Transfer Pricing Under Uncertainty," (co-authored with K. Balachandran), Journal of Accounting Research, Autumn 1988.*

"Legal Liabilities and the Market for Auditing Services," (co-authored with Julie Nelson and Lawrence White), Journal of Accounting, Auditing, and Finance, Vol. 3, No. 3, Summer 1988

- "Effects of Some Probability Displays on Choices," Organizational Behavior and Human Performance, November 1972
