= Chen Chen-hsiang =

Taiwanese politician

- 陳鎮湘
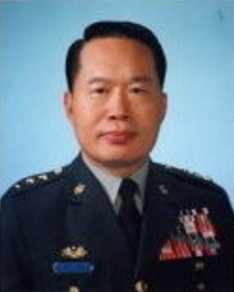
- General Chen Chen-hsiang in army service uniform

Vice Chairman of the Kuomintang
- In office 23 November 2016 – 30 June 2017
- Chairperson: Hung Hsiu-chu

Member of Legislative Yuan
- In office 1 February 2012 – 31 January 2016
- Constituency: Republic of China

Commander-in-chief, Republic of China Army
- In office 1 February 1999 – 31 January 2002

Personal details
- Born: 10 October 1942 (age 83) Wuhu, Anhui
- Party: Kuomintang
- Education: Republic of China Military Academy (BS); National Defense University (MS)

Military service
- Branch/service: Republic of China Army
- Rank: General

Chen Chen-hsiang (traditional Chinese: 陳鎮湘; simplified Chinese: 陈镇湘; pinyin: Chén Zhènxiāng; born 10 October 1942) is a Taiwanese politician and a retired army general. He served as the Army Commander-in-chief before retirement, and elected into the Eighth Legislative Yuan from 2012 to 2016 and has been the Vice Chairperson of Kuomintang (KMT) since 23 November 2016.

== 2016 Beijing visit ==
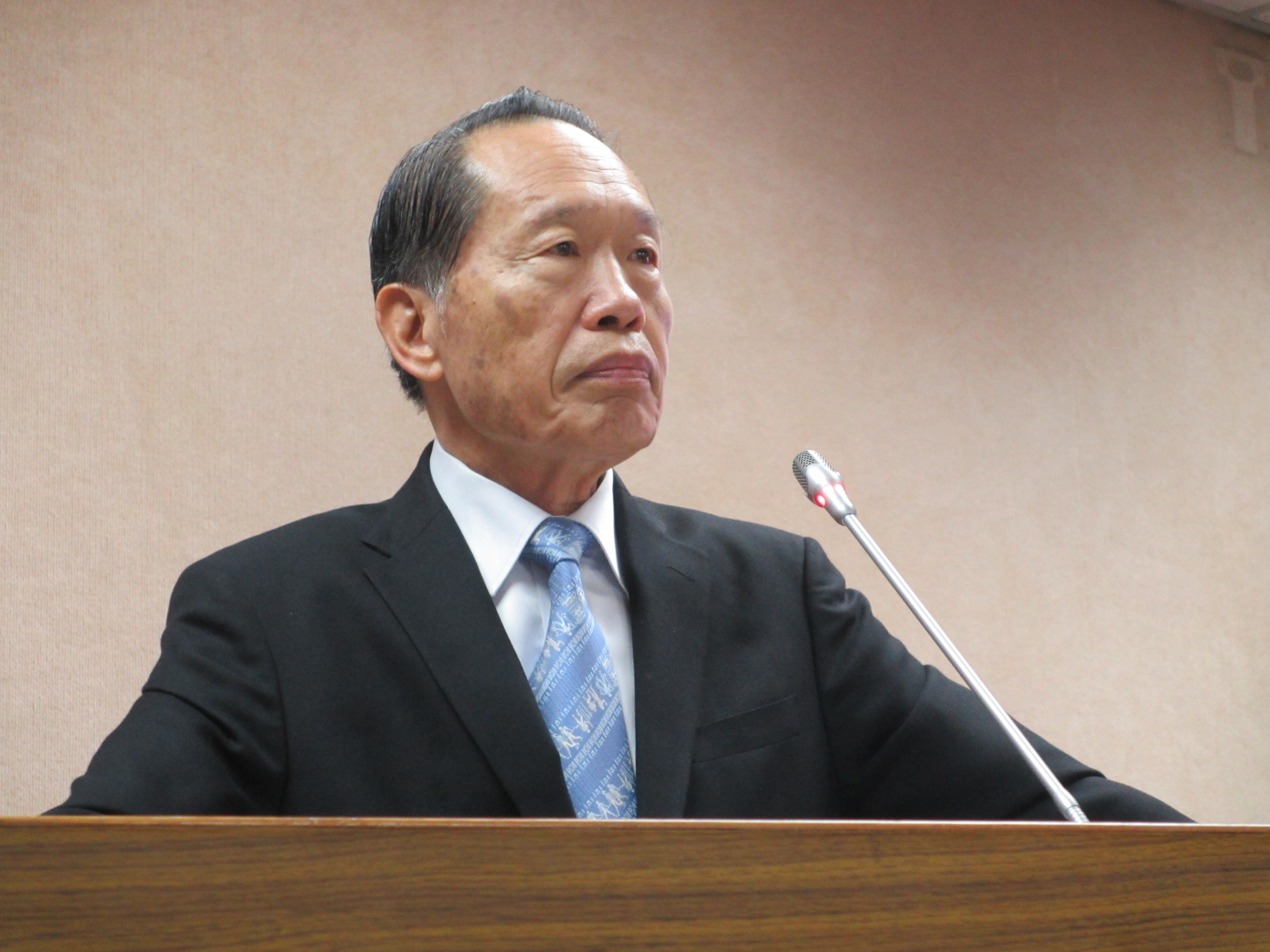
Chen as a legislator of Kuomintang.

Chen was part of a Kuomintang delegation which visited Beijing at the end of December 2016 to hold a dialogue with the Chinese Communist Party (CCP). The meeting with Taiwan Affairs Office Director Zhang Zhijun focused on exchanges between KMT and CCP officials, exchanges between young people between the two sides and protection of the people's rights and interests. They attended a trade fair on 24 December 2016 to promote agricultural products and tourism from Hualien County, Hsinchu County, Kinmen County, Lienchiang County, Miaoli County, Nantou County, New Taipei City and Taitung County.
