= Ronald Freedman =

American demographer (1917–2007)

- Born: August 8, 1917; Winnipeg, Canada
- Died: November 21, 2007 (aged 90); Ann Arbor, Michigan, U.S.
- Education: University of Chicago; University of Michigan
- Known for: Survey research on fertility
- Awards: IUSSP Laureate; NAS Member
- Scientific career
- Fields: Demography
- Workplaces: University of Michigan
- Notable students: Timothy Ting; Linda Waite

Ronald Freedman (1917–2007) was an international demographer and founder of the Population Studies Center at the University of Michigan. He led pioneering survey research on fertility in Asia. Born in Winnipeg, Canada, Freedman grew up in Waukegan, Illinois. He received a BA in history and economics from the University of Michigan in 1939, and a master's degree in sociology in 1940. At the University of Chicago, he completed prelims for his PhD in sociology before joining the U.S. Army in 1942 to serve in the Air Corps Weather Service.

Freedman was the recipient of many honors and awards over his career. He was a Guggenheim Fellow, a Fulbright Fellow, President of the Population Association of America, a member of the National Academy of Sciences, winner of the Irene B. Taeuber Award from the Population Association of America and the Office of Population Research. He was also a Laureate of the International Union for the Scientific Study of Population (IUSSP).

Freedman died on November 21, 2007, in Ann Arbor, Michigan, at the age of 90.
