= 2017 Kuomintang chairmanship election =

- 20 May 2017
- Turnout: 58.05% (▲16.44%)
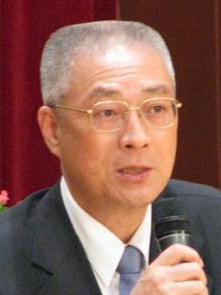

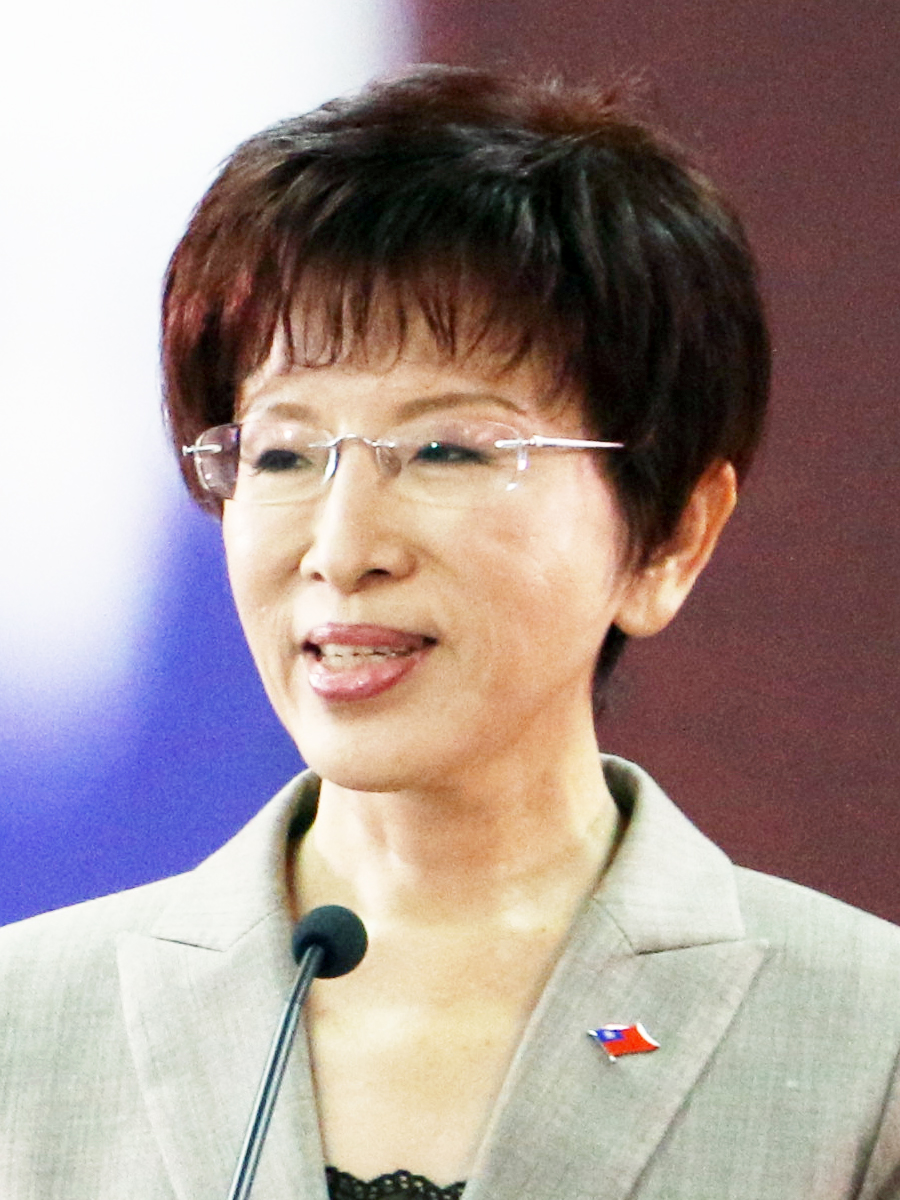

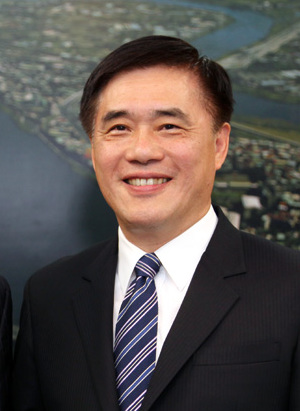

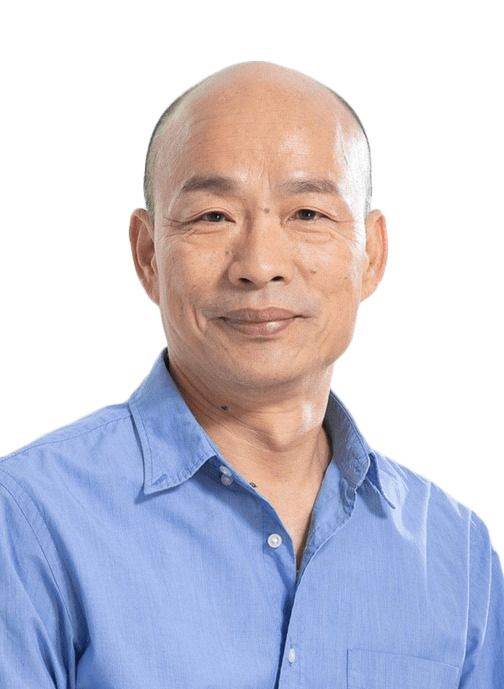

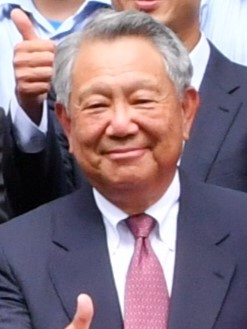

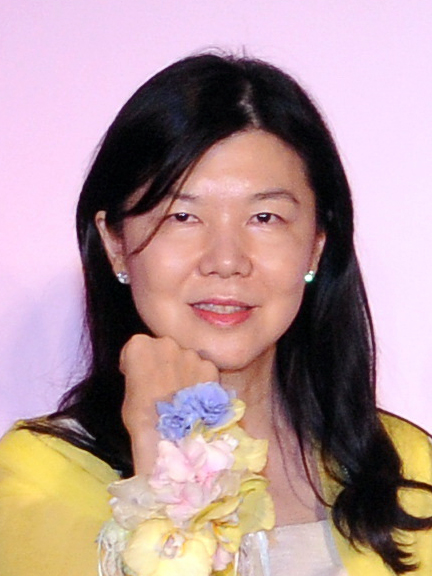
Nominee	Wu Den-yih	Hung Hsiu-chu	Hau Lung-pin
Popular vote	144,408	53,063	44,301
Percentage	52.24%	19.20%	16.03%
Nominee	Han Kuo-yu	Steve Chan	Tina Pan
Popular vote	16,141	12,332	2,437
Percentage	5.84%	4.46%	0.88%
- County level units won by Wu Den-yih. County level units won by Hung Hsiu-chu.
Chairman before election
Hung Hsiu-chu
Lin Junq-tzer (acting)
Elected Chairman
Wu Den-yih

The 2017 Kuomintang chairmanship election (Chinese: 2017年中國國民黨主席選舉) was held on 20 May 2017. This was the eighth direct election of the party leader in Kuomintang history. All registered, due-paying KMT party members were eligible to vote.

== History ==
The 2017 Kuomintang chairmanship election was originally scheduled for 20 July. Alex Tsai cited the KMT party charter while announcing the party's decision to move the election date to 20 May. According to Tsai, the charter states that new party leaders should be elected three months before the last national party congress convened by the incumbent leader. In 2005, Lien Chan left office on 19 August, and, said Tsai, a full-term inauguration should therefore occur on 20 August. For that to happen in accordance with Article 17 of the charter, the 2017 election date was rescheduled to 20 May. The proposal was voted on in a Central Standing Committee meeting held 21 December 2016. Though early reports claimed a lower attendance, fourteen committee members attended the meeting, and 26 people boycotted the vote. Party headquarters stated that the election date change vote was held with a quorum as defined by central governmental standards, and passed; party regulations define a quorum as half the eligible participants, and in the case of the forty-member Central Standing Committee, twenty people must have voted. Liao Kuo-tung took a strong position against the change in election date, calling for Hung Hsiu-chu's resignation as party leader. Central Standing Committee member Yao Chiang-lin filed a civil lawsuit against Hung. In the next Central Standing Committee meeting, the original attempt to reschedule the chairmanship election was placed under reconsideration, and passed, confirming the election date as 20 May 2017. After the meeting, Liao continued claiming that disagreement over the election date was only "partially resolved". He also stated that "only five committee members attended the meeting" called to deliberate the first date change.

== Candidates ==
Incumbent chairperson Hung Hsiu-chu was the first to declare her candidacy for the position. On 7 January 2017, Hau Lung-pin entered the race. Two days later, Wu Den-yih announced his bid for the chairmanship. On 12 January, Han Kuo-yu resigned his executive positions at Taipei Agricultural Products Marketing Corporation and entered the leadership election. Steve Chan launched his chairmanship campaign on 23 January. Tina Pan became the sixth candidate to enter the election on 23 February.

Figures released by the Kuomintang in January showed that, for the election, the eligible electorate included 226,783 party members, while total party membership numbered 887,861 people. By April, the electorate had risen to 451,510 people. Candidates must have collected the signatures of three percent of the Kuomintang membership by 15 April, an approximate minimum of 13,000 in 2017, to qualify for the election. On 21 April, all candidates were officially confirmed.

== Results ==
Shortly after polls closed on 20 May, Wu Den-yih was declared the winner of the election, having won approximately 52 percent of the vote. Wu earned 144,408 votes. Incumbent Hung Hsiu-chu received 53,063 votes, while Hau Lung-pin finished third with 44,301 votes. Han Kuo-yu and Steve Chan finished with the closest margin between candidates at 16,141 and 12,332 votes respectively. Tina Pan placed sixth with 2,437 votes. Turnout was 58.05 percent of 476,147 eligible voters.

2017 Kuomintang chairmanship election
No.	Candidate	Party	Votes	Percentage
1	Wu Den-yih	Kuomintang	144,408	52.24%
2	Hung Hsiu-chu	Kuomintang	53,063	19.20%
3	Hau Lung-pin	Kuomintang	44,301	16.03%
4	Han Kuo-yu	Kuomintang	16,141	5.84%
5	Steve Chan	Kuomintang	12,332	4.46%
6	Tina Pan	Kuomintang	2,437	0.88%
Eligible voters			476,147	
Total votes			276,423	
Valid votes			272,682	
Invalid votes			3,741	
Turnout			58.05%	

Hung Hsiu-chu announced on 14 June that she planned to resign her position by 30 June, and had named Lin Junq-tzer acting chairman of the Kuomintang.
