= Helen Lin =

Taiwanese politician (born 1939)

Lin Cheng-chih (Chinese: 林澄枝; pinyin: Lín Chéngzhī; born 17 February 1939) or Helen Lin is a Taiwanese politician.

== Personal life ==
Lin Cheng-chih is the daughter-in-law of Hsieh Tung-min, and is also known by the English name Helen Lin.

== Career ==
Lin attended the Shih Chien College of Home Economics and served as the institution's president. She also worked within the Kuomintang Department of Women’s Affairs. On 10 June 1996, she was appointed minister of the Council of Cultural Affairs. She cancelled a visit to China when the 1999 Jiji earthquake hit Taiwan, and began planning renovations to a number of cultural sites damaged by the quake. Lin was succeeded at the Council for Cultural Affairs by Tchen Yu-chiou in May 2000, when the Chen Shui-bian presidential administration took office.

Lien Chan appointed Helen Lin vice chair of the Kuomintang in June 2000. She became the first woman to take the position. In April 2001, the Kuomintang nominated Lin for an open position on a committee convened to oversee Public Television Service. Following the first direct election for Kuomintang leadership in July 2001, Lin was retained as a vice chair of the party. During the 2003 SARS outbreak, Lin led the Kuomintang's epidemic prevention task force. Lin retained her post as a vice chairwoman when Ma Ying-jeou was elected Kuomintang chairman in 2005. In 2006, she co-chaired a Kuomintang committee to vet candidates for the Control Yuan. Following the Cross-Strait Economic, Trade and Culture Forum in April 2006, Lin resigned as vice chair of the Kuomintang and was succeeded by Chang Jen-hsiang.
