= Hau Lung-pin =

Taiwanese politician and chemist (born 1952)

Hau Lung-pin MLY
- 郝龍斌
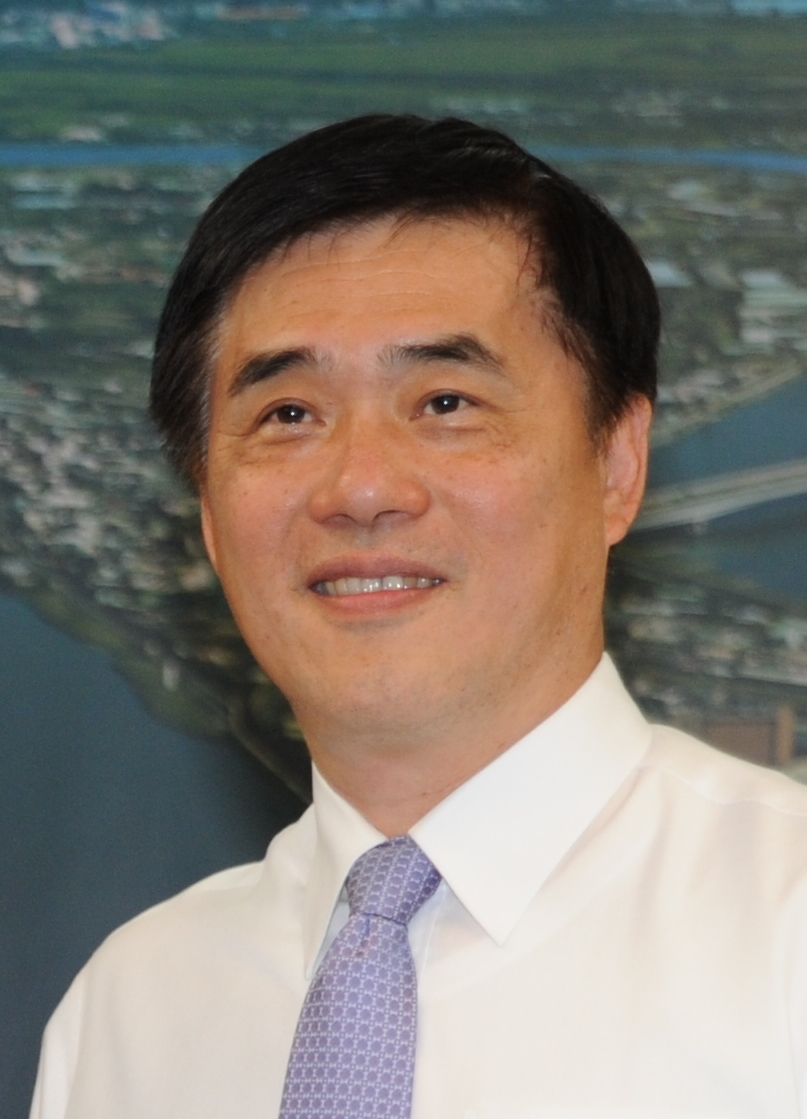
- Hau in 2013

Vice Chairman of the Kuomintang
- In office May 18, 2016 – January 15, 2020
- Chairperson: See list: Hung Hsiu-chu Wu Den-yih
- In office April 30, 2014 – November 30, 2014
- Chairperson: See list: Ma Ying-jeou Wu Den-yih (acting) Eric Chu

12th Mayor of Taipei
- In office December 26, 2006 – December 25, 2014
- Deputy: See list: Tim Ting Chen Hsiung-wen Chen Wei-zen Chang Chin-oh
- Preceded by: Ma Ying-jeou
- Succeeded by: Ko Wen-je

6th Minister of the Environmental Protection Administration
- In office March 7, 2001 – October 6, 2003
- Prime Minister: Chang Chun-hsiung; Yu Shyi-kun
- Preceded by: Edgar Lin
- Succeeded by: Chang Juu-en

8th Convener of the New Party National Committee
- In office March 2000 – March 2001
- Preceded by: Lee Ching-hua
- Succeeded by: Hsieh Chi-ta

Member of the Legislative Yuan
- In office February 1, 1996 – March 7, 2001
- Constituency: Taipei I

Personal details
- Born: August 22, 1952 (age 73) Taipei, Taiwan
- Party: Kuomintang; New Party (1990s–2006)
- Relations: Hau Pei-tsun (father)
- Education: National Taiwan University (BS); University of Massachusetts Amherst (PhD)
- Scientific career
- Fields: Agricultural chemistry
- Thesis: Thermal oxidation and radiolysis of lipids in monolayers (1994)

Hau Lung-pin (Chinese: 郝龍斌; pinyin: Hǎo Lóngbīn; Pe̍h-ōe-jī: Hok Liông-pin; born August 22, 1952) is a Taiwanese chemist and politician. As a member of the New Party, he was elected to the Legislative Yuan in 1995, and resigned his seat to lead the Environmental Protection Administration in 2001. Hau stepped down from the EPA in 2003 and served as Mayor of Taipei from 2006 to 2014. He joined the Kuomintang (KMT) in 2006 and has served as vice chairman of the party in 2014 and from 2016 to 2020.

== Early life and education ==
Hau Lung-pin was born in Taipei on August 22, 1952. His father, Hau Pei-tsun, was a former premier and four-star general. His ancestral home is located in Yancheng, Jiangsu, China.

After graduating from Cheng Kung Senior High School, Hau studied agricultural chemistry at National Taiwan University and received a Bachelor of Science (B.S.) in 1975. He then completed doctoral studies in the United States, earning his Ph.D. in food chemistry, food science, and agricultural chemistry from the University of Massachusetts Amherst in 1984. His doctoral dissertation was titled, "Thermal oxidation and radiolysis of lipids in monolayers".

== Career ==
When Hau returned to Taiwan after his doctoral studies, he taught as a professor (1983–88, associate professor; 1988–96, professor) at the Graduate Institute of Food Science and Technology at National Taiwan University. As an educator, Hau won numerous awards including awards for excellence in teaching and in research.

Hau left the Kuomintang in the early 1990s to join the New Party. He was elected as a legislator in 1995, and served until his appointment as chief of the central government's Environmental Protection Administration in 2001 under President Chen Shui-bian. He resigned from that position in 2003.

Hau served as the secretary-general of the Red Cross in Taiwan and rejoined the Kuomintang in January 2006.

== Taipei mayoralty ==
=== 2006 Taipei mayoral election ===
On May 27, 2006, Hau was selected as the KMT's candidate for the Taipei mayoral election, winning 60% of the primary vote. He was subsequently elected Mayor of Taipei in the 2006 Republic of China municipal elections, defeating DPP candidate and former premier Frank Hsieh with 53.81% of the popular vote.

No	Candidate	Party	Votes	%
1	Li Ao		7,795	0.61%
2	Clara Chou (Note: Despite Chou's expulsion from the Taiwan Solidarity Union on November 9, 2006, the party could not withdraw their recommendation for Chou under Republic of China's Public Officials Election and Recall Law. She would still contest the elections as a TSU candidate.)		3,372	0.26%
3	Frank Hsieh		525,869	40.89%
4	James Soong (Note: James Soong was Chairman of the People's First Party at the time of the elections, but entered the elections as an independent.)		53,281	4.14%
5	Hau Lung-pin		692,085	53.81%
6	Ke Tsi-hai (柯賜海)		3,687	0.29%

=== 2010 Taipei mayoral election ===
Hau was reelected for a second term in November 2010 with 55.65% of the vote, defeating DPP candidate and former premier Su Tseng-chang.

Party	#	Candidate	Votes	Percentage
Kuomintang	2	Hau Lung-pin	797,865	55.65%
Democratic Progressive Party	5	Su Tseng-chang	628,129	43.81%
Independent	4	Francis Wu (吳武明)	3,672	0.26%
Independent	3	Helen Hsiao (蕭淑華)	2,238	0.16%
Independent	1	Wu Yen-cheng (吳炎成)	1,832	0.13%
Total			1,433,736	100.00%
Voter turnout				

=== Taiwanese fisherman shooting incident ===
Hau spoke at Taipei City Hall shortly after the 2013 Guang Da Xing No. 28 incident involving Taiwan and the Philippines occurred on 9 May 2013 in disputed water of the South China Sea. In his comments, Hau urged the ROC government to take action against the Philippine government by suspending all exchanges with them, banning the recruitment of their workers, sending naval ships and extending their patrol beyond the exclusive economic zone to protect Taiwanese fishermen, retracting the 2013 Dragon Boat Festival invitation extended to the Philippines (an event scheduled to take place in June), bringing the killers to justice, compensating the family of the shooting victim, and suspending the donation of two ROC ambulances to the Philippines. He also advised Taipei residents not to travel to the Philippines.

=== 2013 China visit ===
In early July 2013, Hau led a delegation to attend the Shanghai–Taipei City Forum in Shanghai. He met with the director of Taiwan Affairs Office Zhang Zhijun and Mayor of Shanghai Yang Xiong. The Taipei City Government and Shanghai City Government will sign several memorandums regarding libraries, district administration and "1999" city hotline service. The delegation also will discuss about cross-strait business, sports, education and media.

During his stay in Shanghai, he made a statement regarding the recently signed Cross-Strait Service Trade Agreement between Straits Exchange Foundation and Association for Relations Across the Taiwan Straits that China should establish mutual trust with Taiwan, reassure the Taiwanese people and strive for Taiwanese support on the issue.

== Later political career ==
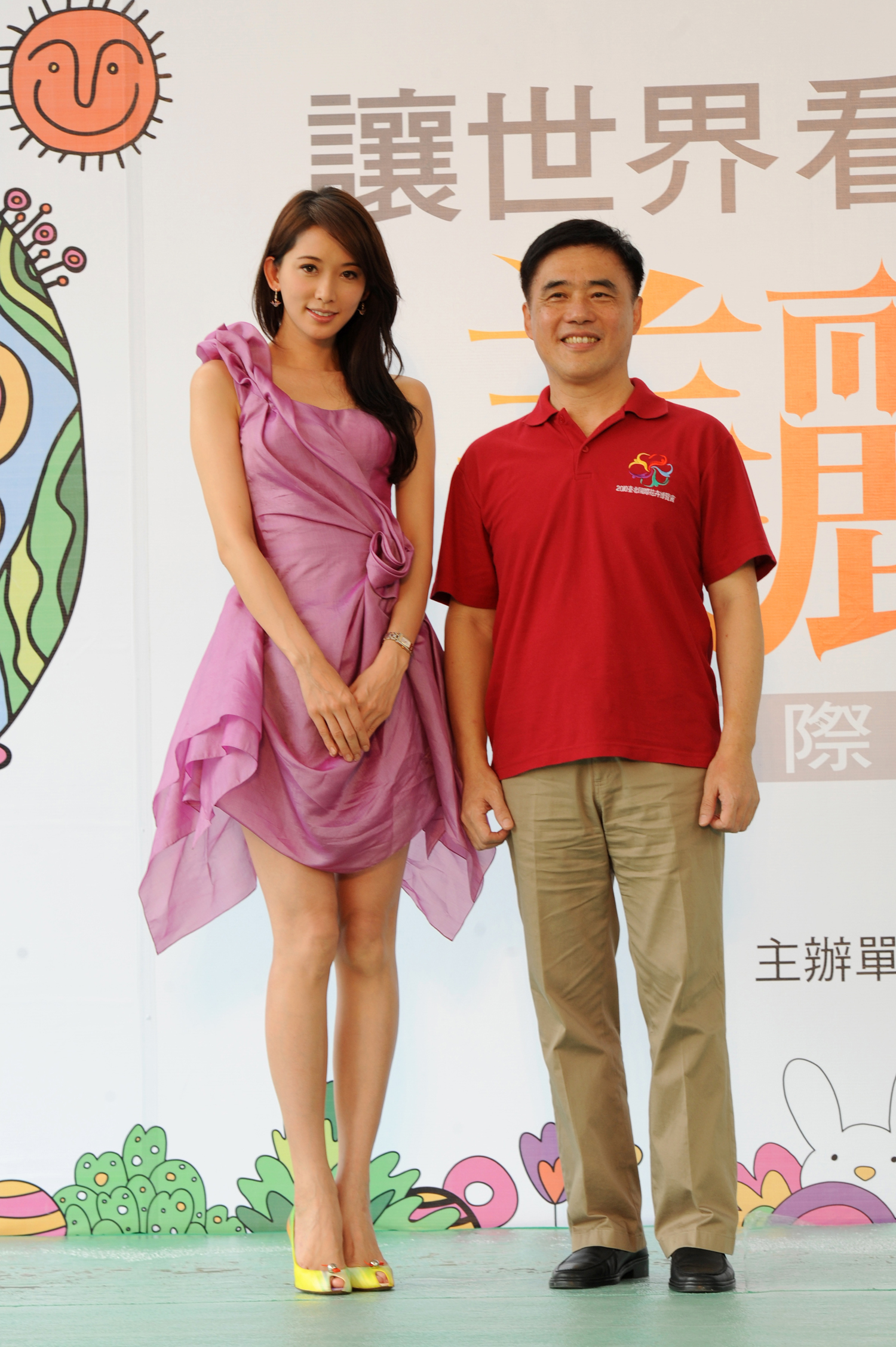
The actress Lin Chi-ling and Hau Lung-pin at the 2010 Taipei International Flora Exposition

He was named a vice chairman of the Kuomintang in April 2014 and served until November.

=== 2016 legislative election ===
Hau declared his candidacy for the Keelung City legislative seat in July 2015. However, he lost to Democratic Progressive Party candidate Tsai Shih-ying. Hau announced his intention to run for the position of Kuomintang chair on January 21, 2016, shortly after former party leader Eric Chu had resigned the position following defeat in the presidential elections. Hau dropped out of the chairmanship election a few days later. He was reappointed a vice chairman of the Kuomintang in May 2016.

Legislative Election 2016: Keelung district
Party	Candidate	Votes	%	±%
DPP	Tsai Shih-ying	78,707	41.45	
KMT	Hau Lung-pin	68,632	36.15	
People First	Liu Wen-hsiung	23,485	12.37	
Minkuotang	Yang Shih-cheng	19,045	10.03	
Majority		10,075	5.30	
Total valid votes		189,869	98.76	
Rejected ballots		2,378	1.24	
DPP gain from KMT		Swing		
Turnout		192,247	64.31	
Registered electors		298,947		

=== 2017 KMT chairmanship election ===
On January 7, 2017, he joined the KMT chairmanship election. The vote was held on May 20, 2017. He finished third in a field of six candidates.

2017 Kuomintang chairmanship election
No.	Candidate	Party	Votes	Percentage
1	Hung Hsiu-chu	Kuomintang	53,063	19.20%
2	Han Kuo-yu	Kuomintang	16,141	5.84%
3	Tina Pan	Kuomintang	2,437	0.88%
4	Hau Lung-pin	Kuomintang	44,301	16.03%
5	Steve Chan	Kuomintang	12,332	4.46%
6	Wu Den-yih	Kuomintang	144,408	52.24%
Eligible voters			476,147	
Total votes			276,423	
Valid votes			272,682	
Invalid votes			3,741	
Turnout			58.05%	

=== 2020 Kuomintang chairmanship election ===
Hau resigned his position as a vice chair of the Kuomintang on January 15, 2020, and declared his candidacy for the top post five days later, as party chairman Wu Den-yih had also resigned his post. In the chairmanship election held on March 7, 2020, Hau was defeated by Johnny Chiang.

== Personal life ==
Hau is married to Kao Lang-sin, with whom he has three children.

== Notes ==
Government offices
Preceded by Ma Ying-jeou	Mayor of Taipei; 2006 – 2014	Succeeded by Ko Wen-je
