= Journal of Accounting, Auditing & Finance =

- Discipline: Accounting
- Language: English
- Edited by: Xiao-Jun Zhang

Publication details
- History: Since 1986
- Publisher: SAGE Publications
- Frequency: Quarterly
- Impact factor: 1.3 (2024)

Standard abbreviations
- ISO 4: J. Account. Audit. Finance

Indexing
- ISSN: 0148-558X (print); 2160-4061 (web)
- LCCN: 77643084
- OCLC no.: 728404366

Links
- Journal homepage; Online access; Online archive

The Journal of Accounting, Auditing & Finance is a quarterly peer-reviewed academic journal that covers the field of accounting. Its editor-in-chief is Xiao-Jun Zhang (Haas School of Business, University of California, Berkeley). It was established in 1986 and is currently published by SAGE Publications, on behalf of The Vincent C. Ross Institute of Accounting Research at The Leonard N. Stern School of Business, New York University. It is widely regarded as one of the Top 10 Journals in the field of accounting.

== Editors ==
- Joshua Ronen (Stern School of Business, New York University), 1986–1993
- Jeffrey L. Callen (Rotman School of Management, University of Toronto), 1993–2000
- Kashi R. Balachandran (Stern School of Business, New York University), 2000–2012
- Bharat Sarath (Rutgers Business School, Rutgers University), 2012–2022
- Xiao-Jun Zhang (Haas School of Business, University of California, Berkeley), 2022–present
