= Eric Chu =

Taiwanese statistician and politician (born 1961)

- 朱立倫
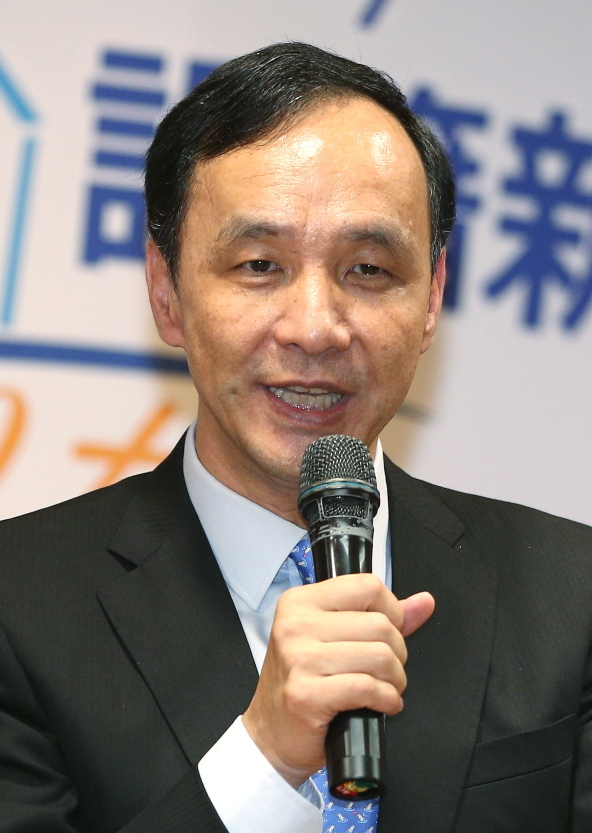
- Chu in 2018

7th & 11th Chairman of the Kuomintang
- In office 5 October 2021 – 1 November 2025
- Deputy: See list: Sean Lien Andrew Hsia Huang Min-hui
- Secretary General: Justin Huang
- Preceded by: Johnny Chiang
- Succeeded by: Cheng Li-wun
- In office 19 January 2015 – 16 January 2016
- Deputy: See list: Hau Lung-pin Huang Min-hui
- Secretary General: Lee Shu-chuan
- Preceded by: Ma Ying-jeou; Wu Den-yih (Acting)
- Succeeded by: Huang Min-hui (Acting); Hung Hsiu-chu

1st Mayor of New Taipei
- In office 25 December 2010 – 25 December 2018 (Note: Hou Yu-ih served as acting mayor from 20 October 2015 to 18 January 2016 during Chu's presidential campaign.)
- Deputy: See list: Hou Yu-ih Hsu Chih-chien Lee Shih-chuan Chen Shen-hsien
- Preceded by: Chou Hsi-wei (as Magistrate of Taipei County)
- Succeeded by: Hou Yu-ih

29th Vice Premier of the Republic of China
- In office 10 September 2009 – 17 May 2010
- Premier: Wu Den-yih
- Preceded by: Paul Chiu
- Succeeded by: Sean Chen

Minister of the Consumer Protection Commission
- In office 10 September 2009 – 17 May 2010
- Premier: Wu Den-yih
- Preceded by: Paul Chiu
- Succeeded by: Sean Chen

11th Magistrate of Taoyuan
- In office 20 December 2001 – 10 September 2009
- Deputy: Huang Min-kon
- Preceded by: Hsu Ying-shen (Acting)
- Succeeded by: Huang Min-kon (Acting)

Member of the Legislative Yuan
- In office 1 February 1999 – 20 December 2001
- Constituency: Taoyuan County

Personal details
- Born: 7 June 1961 (age 65) Bade, Taoyuan, Taiwan
- Party: Kuomintang
- Spouse: Kao Wan-ching
- Children: 2
- Education: National Taiwan University (BA); New York University (MBA, PhD)
- Scientific career
- Fields: Applied statistics
- Thesis: Market-based Accounting Research: An International Comparison and New Evidence (1991)
- Doctoral advisor: Joshua Ronen

Chinese name
- Traditional Chinese: 朱立倫
- Simplified Chinese: 朱立伦
Transcriptions
Standard Mandarin
- Hanyu Pinyin: Zhū Lìlún
- Wade–Giles: Chu Li-lun

Eric Chu Li-luan (Chinese: 朱立倫; pinyin: Zhū Lìlún; born on 7 June 1961) is a Taiwanese politician, statistician, and academic who served as the chairman of the Kuomintang from 2015 to 2016 and from 2021 to 2025.

Born in Taoyuan to a political family, Chu graduated from National Taiwan University in 1983 and earned his doctorate from New York University in 1991. After beginning an academic career as an accounting professor, he entered politics as a member of the Legislative Yuan in 1999, representing Taoyuan County. He then served as the magistrate of Taoyuan County from 2001 to 2009, the vice premier of the Republic of China under Wu Den-yih from 2009 to 2010, and was elected as the first mayor of New Taipei in 2010.

On 17 January 2015, he was elected unopposed as the chairman of the Kuomintang, succeeding Ma Ying-jeou. On 17 October 2015, he was chosen as the KMT candidate for the 2016 presidential election, but was defeated by his opponent Tsai Ing-wen, and subsequently resigned his post as KMT chairman. As a result of the 2021 Kuomintang chairmanship election, he returned to his former post as chairman of the party.

== Early life and education ==
Chu was born on 7 June 1961 in Bade City, Taoyuan County. His ancestral home is in Yiwu, Zhejiang. His father, Chu Chang-hsing (朱樟興; d. 2025), served in the local Taoyuan legislature and in the National Assembly. His uncle, Lin Hsi-da, was a member of the Democratic Progressive Party (DPP) who served as the mayor of Daxi Township; Chu's mother is also from Daxi. His father-in-law, Taiwanese politician and businessman Kao Yu-jen, formerly served as a Kuomintang legislator.

Chu attended Taipei Municipal Chien Kuo High School, where he was classmates with Jiang Yi-huah and Lai Ching-te, and originally studied science before switching to liberal arts in his second year. After graduating in 1978, he studied business administration at National Taiwan University and graduated with a Bachelor of Arts in 1983. He then completed military service in the Republic of China Armed Forces and pursued doctoral studies in the United States at New York University, where he earned a Master of Business Administration (M.B.A.) in finance in 1987 and his Ph.D. in accounting and applied statistics in 1991, both from the New York University Stern School of Business.

As a graduate student at NYU, Chu received a scholarship to complete his studies and met his wife, Kao Wan-ching (高婉倩), who was a doctoral student at Columbia University studying mass communications. Chu's doctoral dissertation, completed under accounting professor Joshua Ronen, was titled, "Market-Based Accounting Research: An International Comparison and New Evidence". The thesis examined the rate of returns in the Taiwan Stock Exchange compared to those in U.S. markets.

== Academic career ==
After receiving his doctorate, Chu worked as an assistant professor at Baruch College of the City University of New York from 1990 to 1992. He then returned to Taiwan and became an associate professor (1992–1997) and then full professor (1997–2001) of accounting at National Taiwan University. His expertise included accounting, financial analysis, and public policy. In 1995, Chu was a visiting professor at Peking University. He has continued to teach graduate accounting courses part-time at National Taiwan University since 2020. In October 2020, Chu also taught accounting at Soochow University as its Yen Chia-kan Chair Professor.

== Early political career ==
Chu entered electoral politics in 1998 after several years as an accounting professor at National Taiwan University. Running as a KMT candidate in the 1998 legislative election for the multi-member Taoyuan County constituency, he was elected to the 4th Legislative Yuan. Chu took office on 1 February 1999 and represented Taoyuan until 20 December 2001, when he left the legislature to take office as magistrate of the county. He served on the Legislative Yuan's Budget and Final Accounts Committee during the first four sessions of the fourth legislature and again during its sixth session, and also sat on the Procedure Committee during the third session. He became a convener of the Budget and Final Accounts Committee in 2000 and subsequently served as a convener of the Finance Committee in 2001.

== Taoyuan County magistrate (2001–2009) ==
Chu was the KMT candidate for Taoyuan County magistrate in the 2001 local elections, held on 1 December. He received 441,827 votes, or 55.24 percent, defeating Democratic Progressive Party (DPP) candidate Perng Shaw-jiin, who received 353,568 votes, or 44.20 percent. Chu left the Legislative Yuan and took office as magistrate on 20 December 2001.

As magistrate, Chu was primarily known for his fiscal management and economic development reforms. When he took office at the end of 2001, Taoyuan County had an annual revenue-expenditure deficit of NT$10.9 billion. His administration sought to improve the county's finances through investment promotion, management of county-owned property, and efforts to obtain subsidies from the central government. By 2003, the annual deficit had fallen to NT$3 billion, and in November 2004 the county government expected to achieve a balanced budget for that year.

Chu won reelection in the 2005 local elections. He received 488,979 votes, or 60.84 percent, compared with 307,965 votes, or 38.32 percent, for DPP candidate Cheng Pao-ching, while independent candidate Wu Chia-teng received 6,784 votes. According to a 2007 survey by Global Views Monthly, Taoyuan residents identified transportation and public works, tourism and recreation, and education and culture as the three areas of county policy with which they were most satisfied during Chu's tenure.

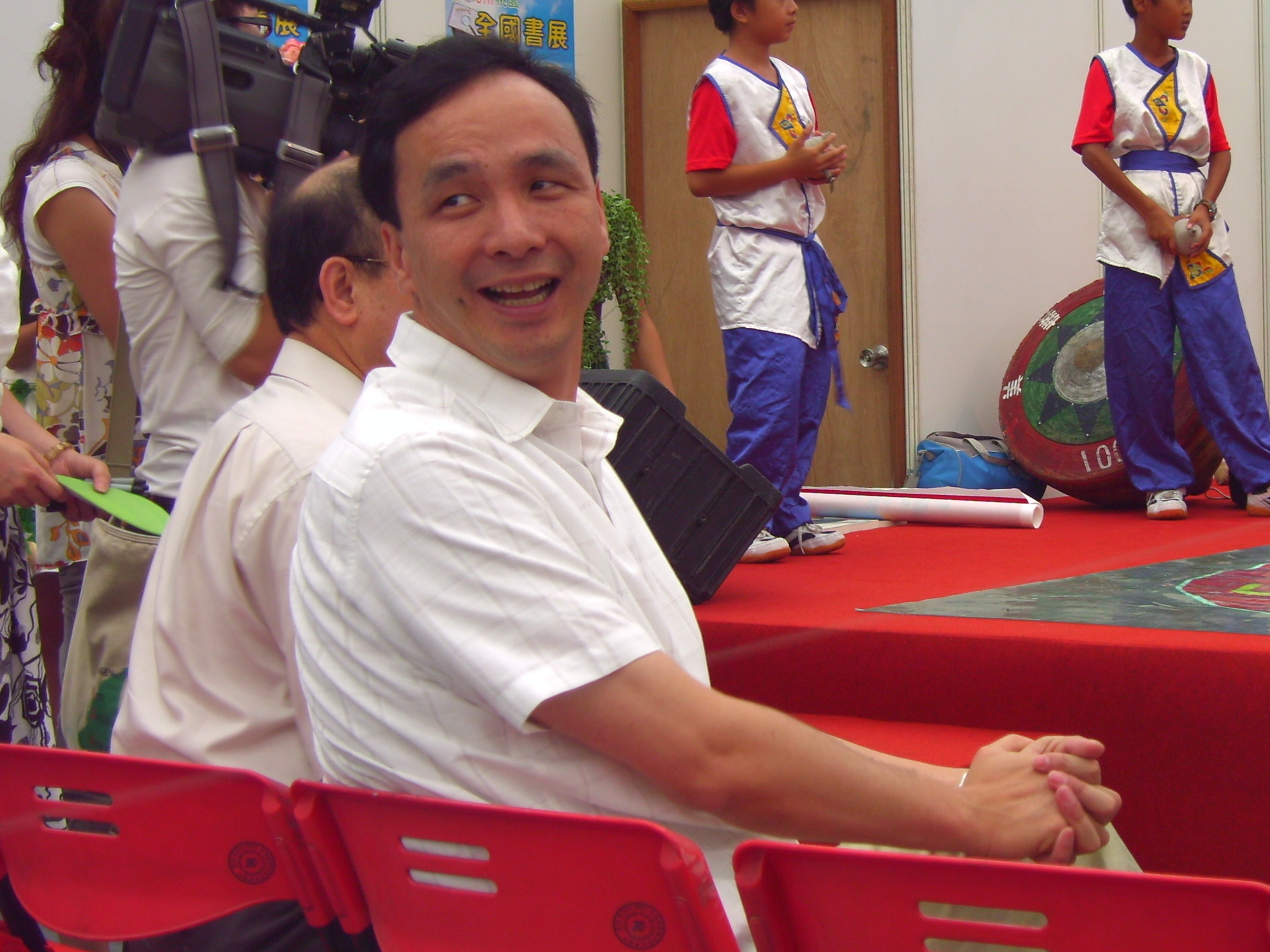
Chu at the 2007 Taoyuan Book Exhibition

A major development during Chu's second term was the proposed Taoyuan Aerotropolis. In 2007, the Taoyuan County Government completed a draft special statute for the aerotropolis and planned to submit it to the Legislative Yuan. Chu's proposal involved integrating Taiwan Taoyuan International Airport with passenger and cargo facilities, a free-trade zone, logistics parks, convention facilities, hotels, shopping and recreation, as well as connections to rapid transit and the Taoyuan high-speed rail station. In April 2009, President Ma Ying-jeou said that during his 2008 presidential campaign he had incorporated Chu's aerotropolis proposal into his "i-Taiwan 12 Projects" program, which sought to develop more than 5,000 hectares surrounding the airport.

== Vice premier (2009–2010) ==
On 22 November 2008, a meeting of the KMT's 17th National Congress approved party chairman Wu Poh-hsiung's nomination of Chu and four other politicians as Vice Chairmen of the Kuomintang. Chu left the Taoyuan County government before joining the cabinet of newly-appointed premier Wu Den-yih in September 2009. He was sworn in as vice premier on 10 September 2009. His former position as Magistrate of Taoyuan County was filled by the deputy magistrate, Huang Min-kon.

As vice premier, Chu became chairman of the Executive Yuan's Consumer Protection Commission. Wu also appointed Chu as the commander-in-chief of the H1N1 Central Epidemic Command Center, and Chu subsequently oversaw the government's response to the 2009 swine flu pandemic. In May 2010, the KMT selected Chu as its candidate for mayor of the newly-established New Taipei City. He submitted his resignation as vice premier on 13 May, stating that he could not simultaneously conduct the campaign and carry out his cabinet responsibilities. Wu accepted the resignation and appointed Sean Chen, then chairman of the Financial Supervisory Commission, as his successor. Chu formally left office on 17 May 2010.

== New Taipei City mayoralty (2010–2018) ==
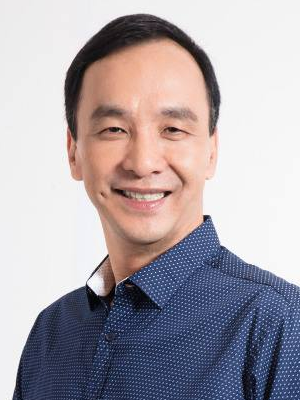
Chu in 2017, as mayor of New Taipei City

Chu was nominated by the Kuomintang (KMT) to contest the first mayoral election for the newly-established New Taipei City in 2010. During the campaign, he proposed an expansion of the city's MRT network, including ten new lines and three circular routes, as well as low-cost community housing and additional childcare subsidies. On the election day of 27 November, Chu received 1,115,536 votes against 1,004,900 for Democratic Progressive Party (DPP) chairwoman Tsai Ing-wen. He was sworn in on 25 December as the first mayor of New Taipei City, on the day that Taipei County was upgraded to a special municipality. His first cabinet of deputy mayors included Lee Shih-chuan, Hsu Chih-chien, and Hou Yu-ih.

In February 2011, Chu's administration announced that it would continue pursuing a proposed Minsheng–Xizhi MRT line after the Ministry of Transportation and Communications rejected an initial proposal. In October 2011, the city government announced a housing program organized around four areas: social housing, legal protections for residents, reuse of idle public property, and rental subsidies for lower-income residents. The program included plans for three social-housing developments in Zhonghe and Sanchong that the government estimated would provide more than 1,200 units. The administration also opened its first public childcare center in Xizhi on 1 October 2011, which the city government described as Taiwan's first such public childcare center. By November 2014, 34 public childcare centers had opened in New Taipei City.

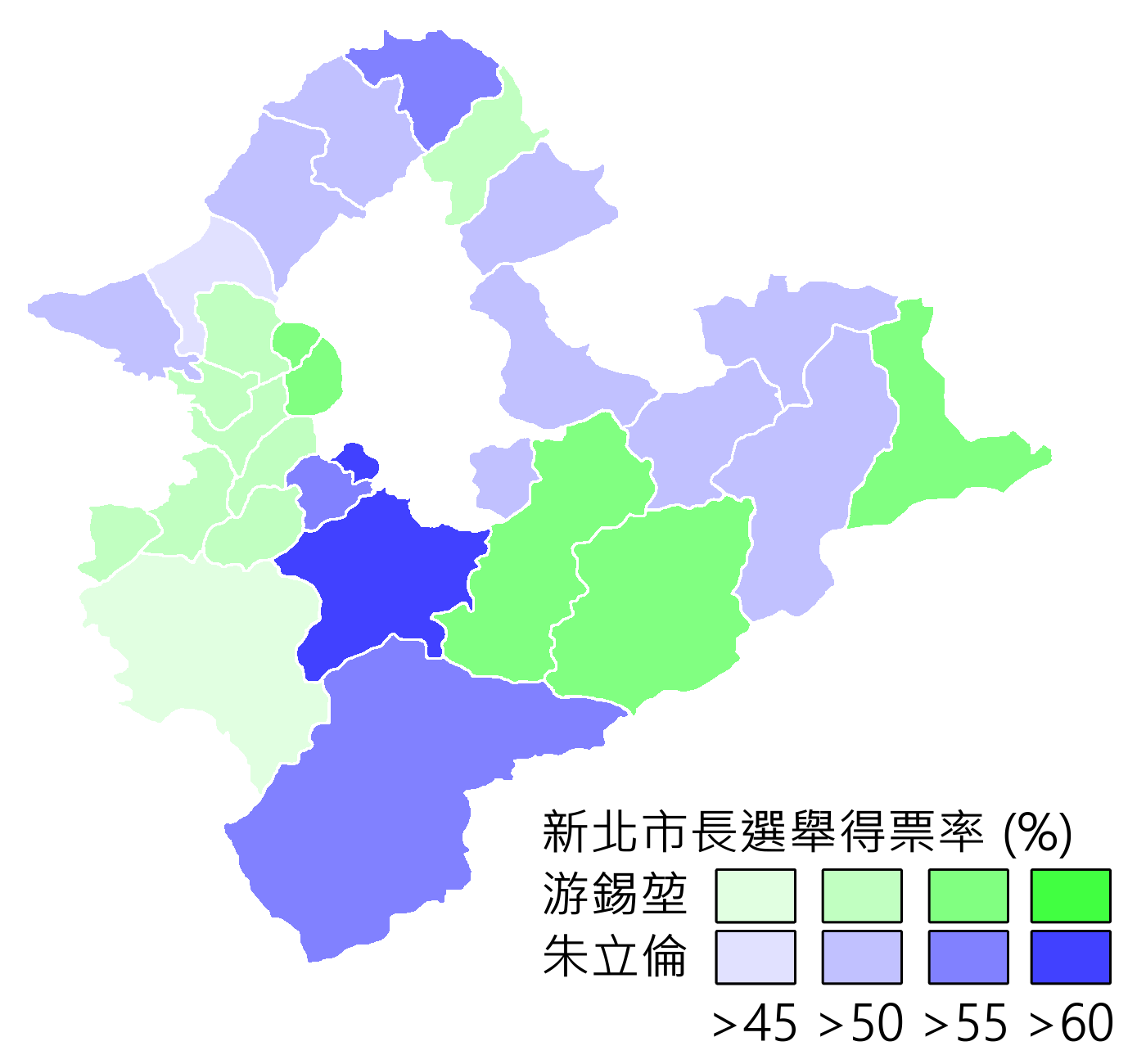
2014 election result in New Taipei City for Chu (blue) and Yu Shyi-kun (green)

Chu announced in June 2014 that he would seek a second term as mayor. In the 2014 local election, he received 959,302 votes, narrowly defeating former premier Yu Shyi-kun, who received 934,774 votes, while independent candidate Li Chin-shun received 22,207 votes. Chu was sworn in for his second term on 25 December 2014. Following the Formosa Fun Coast dust explosion on 27 June 2015, Chu ordered a ban on powder-based activities in the city and established an emergency response group.

In August 2018, Chu reported to the city council that New Taipei's bus network had expanded to 287 routes and its YouBike network to 501 stations. By November 2018, the city's Urban and Rural Development Department reported that 5,619 social-housing units had been completed in New Taipei. The 59th and 60th public childcare centers opened on 17 December, completing the administration's stated eight-year goal of establishing 60 centers. The 7.3-kilometre, 11-station Green Mountain line of the Danhai light rail opened on 23 December 2018, two days before Chu left office. At the same time, the first phase of the Circular line was nearly complete, while the Wanda, Ankeng, and Sanying rail projects remained under construction. Chu completed his second term on 25 December 2018 and was succeeded by his former deputy mayor Hou Yu-ih.

== Chair of the Kuomintang ==
=== First term, 2015–2016 ===
Chu sought the Kuomintang chairmanship after Ma Ying-jeou resigned from the post following the party's defeat in the 2014 local elections. Running unopposed in the party's 17 January 2015 by-election, he received 196,065 votes, or 99.61 percent, from 349,374 eligible party members; turnout was 56.34 percent. Chu took office on 19 January. He retained former Taipei mayor Hau Lung-bin and former Chiayi mayor Huang Min-hui as vice chairpersons and appointed Executive Yuan secretary-general Lee Shih-chuan as the KMT's secretary-general.

In May 2015, Chu traveled to China as KMT chairman to attend the 10th Cross-Strait Economic, Trade and Culture Forum in Shanghai. On 4 May 2015, Chu met Chinese leader Xi Jinping, general secretary of the Chinese Communist Party, at the Great Hall of the People in Beijing.

In April 2015, Chu announced that he would not contest the 2016 presidential election, saying in April that he intended to complete his term as mayor of New Taipei City. The KMT National Congress instead nominated Legislative Yuan deputy speaker Hung Hsiu-chu as its presidential candidate on 19 July. On 17 October, however, an extraordinary party congress voted 812–891 to revoke Hung's nomination and subsequently selected Chu as the party's presidential candidate. Chu apologized to New Taipei residents for breaking his earlier promise to complete his mayoral term after accepting the nomination. In the election on 16 January 2016, Chu and running mate Wang Ju-hsuan received 3,813,365 votes, or 31.04 percent, compared with 6,894,744 votes, or 56.12 percent, for the DPP ticket of Tsai Ing-wen and Chen Chien-jen. Chu announced his resignation as KMT chairman after conceding the election, saying that he would take responsibility for the party's defeat.

=== Second term, 2021–2025 ===
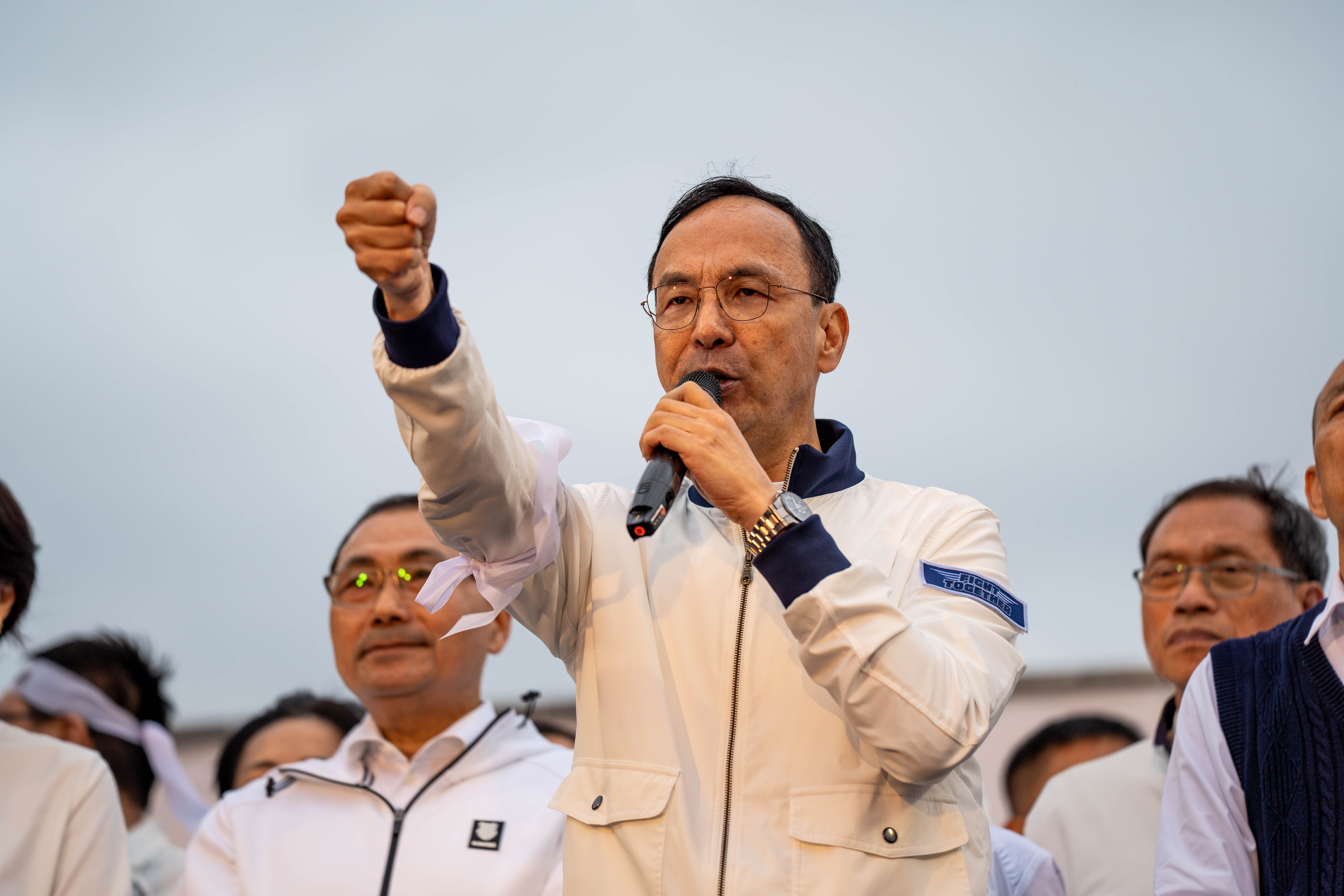
Chu in 2025, protesting against the 2025 mass electoral recall campaigns

Chu returned to the KMT chairmanship after winning the party leadership election on 25 September 2021 with 85,164 votes, or 45.78 percent. After taking office, he appointed a new senior leadership team and nominated Huang Min-hui, Andrew Hsia, and Sean Lien as party vice chairpersons. In June 2022, Chu traveled to the United States and reopened the KMT's liaison office in Washington, D.C.

In March 2023, Chu announced that the KMT would select its candidate for the 2024 Taiwanese presidential election through a recruitment process rather than a primary. On 17 May, after consulting party officials and reviewing polling data, he announced the nomination of Hou Yu-ih. Chu later negotiated with Ko Wen-je, the chairman of the Taiwan People's Party, over a possible joint presidential ticket, culminating in a 15 November agreement to use opinion polls to determine the ordering of the ticket, but the agreement subsequently collapsed.

After the 2024 presidential election ended with a KMT defeat, Chu said that he would accept responsibility for the party's defeat but would remain chairman through the end of his term. In March 2024, he backed an organizational restructuring that integrated the Huang Fu-hsing branch into the KMT's regular local organization and created a veterans-service committee. During the 2025 Taiwanese mass electoral recall campaigns, Chu campaigned against the recall of KMT legislators, addressing a large anti-recall rally on Ketagalan Boulevard on 25 July, the eve of the first round of voting. Ahead of the second round in August, he continued campaigning for targeted legislators, including accompanying Lo Ming-tsai on a motorcade through Xindian and urging voters to cast ballots against the recalls. On 23 August 2025, Chu announced that he would step down from party leadership, leaving office on 1 November, and was succeeded by Cheng Li-wun.

== Selected publications ==
- Chu, Eric Liluan (1 September 1997). "Impact of Earnings, Dividends and Cash Flows on Stock Returns: Case of Taiwan's Stock Market" (PDF). Review of Quantitative Finance and Accounting. 9 (2). Springer: 181–202. doi:10.1023/A:1008264510023. ISSN 1573-7179.
- Chu, Eric Liluan (2014). "New Taipei City's Innovation to Safeguard Children". Public Administration Review. 74 (5): 557–558. doi:10.1111/puar.12235. ISSN 1540-6210.

== Notes ==
Political offices
Preceded by Hsu Ying-shen; Acting	Magistrate of Taoyuan; 2001–2009	Succeeded by Huang Min-kon; Acting
Preceded by Paul Chiu	Vice Premier of the Republic of China; 2009–2010	Succeeded by Sean Chen
Preceded by Chou Hsi-wei as Magistrate of Taipei	Mayor of New Taipei; 2010–2015, 2016–2018	Succeeded by Hou Yu-ih; Acting
Preceded by Hou Yu-ih; Acting	Mayor of New Taipei; 2010–2015, 2016–2018	Succeeded by Hou Yu-ih
Party political offices
Preceded by Wu Den-yih; Acting	Chairman of the Kuomintang; 2015–2016	Succeeded by Huang Min-hui; Acting
Preceded by Hung Hsiu-chu; Withdrew	Kuomintang nominee for President of the Republic of China; 2016	Succeeded by Han Kuo-yu
Preceded by Johnny Chiang	Chairman of the Kuomintang; 2021–2025	Succeeded by Cheng Li-wun
