= Steve Chan (Taiwanese politician) =

Taiwanese physician and politician

- 詹啟賢
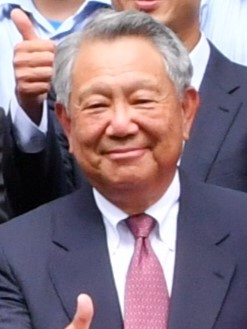

First Vice Chairman of the Kuomintang
- In office 15 June 2016 – 7 January 2017
- Chairperson: Hung Hsiu-chu
- Preceded by: Wu Den-yih

Minister of Department of Health of the Republic of China
- In office 1 September 1997 – 19 May 2000
- Preceded by: Chang Po-ya
- Succeeded by: Lee Ming-liang

Personal details
- Born: 9 July 1948 (age 78) Yuanlin, Taichung County, Taiwan
- Party: Kuomintang
- Education: Chung Shan Medical University (MD)
- Profession: Physician

Chan Chi-shean (Chinese: 詹啟賢; pinyin: Zhān Qǐxián; born 9 July 1948), also known by his English name Steve Chan, is a Taiwanese physician and politician. He served as health minister from 1997 to 2000, and as vice chairman of the Kuomintang from 2016 to 2017.

== Early life and education ==
Born in Yuanlin Township, Changhua County in 1948, Chan attended high school alongside Jason Hu and graduated from Chungshan Medical and Dental College in 1972.

== Career ==
Chan left Taiwan for the United States to begin his medical career. He was surgical resident at the Hospital of Saint Raphael from 1975 to 1977, when he moved to Mercy Catholic Medical Center, which was affiliated with Jefferson Medical College. In 1980, Chan began working at the Pomona Valley Hospital Medical Center, returning to Taiwan in 1989 for a position at Feng Chia Hospital. After one year, Chan joined Chi Mei Medical Center until he was named the minister of the Department of Health in 1997. Though a member of the Kuomintang, Chan took the position as an independent. As health minister, Chan repeatedly addressed the World Health Assembly and asked for Taiwan to be granted observer status. Chan stepped down three years later, and returned to Chi Mei. During Chan's second stint at Chi Mei, President Chen Shui-bian was shot and taken there for treatment. In 2007, Chan was named Ma Ying-jeou's campaign manager, taking him out of consideration for election to the Legislative Yuan via party-list proportional representation. Ma won the 2008 presidential election, and named Chan an adviser.

While a presidential adviser, Chan was also a Kuomintang deputy secretary-general and president of Adimmune Corporation. Chan stepped down from his party position in December 2009. Under Chan's leadership since 2008, Adimmune secured a government contract to produce an H1N1 vaccination, was listed on the Taiwan Stock Exchange, and expanded vaccination distribution to mainland China.

Chan was appointed a Kuomintang vice chairman in June 2016, and resigned the post in January 2017. Later that month, Chan announced his candidacy for the top party position. He placed fifth in the election held on 20 May.
