= Hung Hsiu-chu =

Taiwanese politician (born 1948)

- 洪秀柱
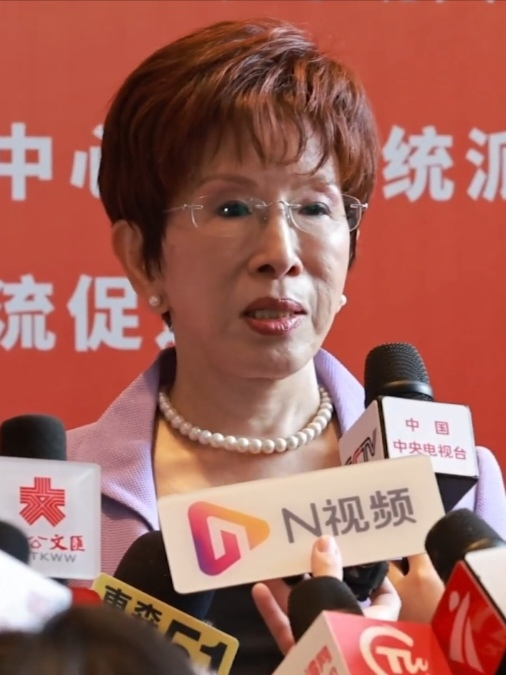
- Hung in 2024

8th Chair of the Kuomintang
- In office 30 March 2016 – 30 June 2017
- Deputy: See list: Hau Lung-pin Jason Hu Lin Junq-tzer
- Secretary General: Mo Tien-hu
- Preceded by: Huang Min-hui (acting)
- Succeeded by: Lin Junq-tzer (acting)

14th Vice President of the Legislative Yuan
- In office 1 February 2012 – 31 January 2016
- President: Wang Jin-pyng
- Preceded by: Tseng Yung-chuan
- Succeeded by: Tsai Chi-chang

Member of the Legislative Yuan
- In office 1 February 1990 – 31 January 2016
- Constituency: See list: Party-list (4th, 7th & 8th) Taipei County 3rd (5th & 6th) Taipei County At-large (2nd & 3rd) Taiwan Province 1st Const. (1st)

Vice Chairperson of the Kuomintang
- In office 15 February 2012 – 19 January 2015
- Chairman: Ma Ying-jeou
- Preceded by: Tseng Yung-chuan

Acting Secretary-General of the Kuomintang
- In office 3 December 2014 – 19 January 2015
- Chairman: Wu Den-yih (acting)
- Preceded by: Tseng Yong-chyuan
- Succeeded by: Lee Shu-chuan

Personal details
- Born: 7 April 1948 (age 78) Taipei County, Taiwan Province, Republic of China (now New Taipei City)
- Party: Kuomintang
- Education: Chinese Culture University (LLB); Truman State University (MA)

Hung Hsiu-chu (Chinese: 洪秀柱; pinyin: Hóng Xiùzhù; born 7 April 1948) is a Taiwanese politician. A member of the Kuomintang (KMT), she served as the 8th chair of the Kuomintang from 2016 to 2017, the first woman to serve in the office.

Hung was first elected to the legislature in 1990, and was the Vice President of the Legislative Yuan from 2012 to 2016, her eighth term. She became the first female deputy speaker of the Legislative Yuan. She became the Kuomintang's first elected chairwoman later that year, serving until June 2017. She became known as "xiao la jiao" or "little hot pepper" for her straight-talking style.

The Kuomintang nominated Hung as the party's presidential candidate for the 2016 elections on 19 July 2015, a month after she had won the party's primary election. Her public support remained low, and she was replaced as candidate by KMT Chairman Eric Chu. Hung succeeded Chu as the Kuomintang's first elected female leader in March 2016 after the defeat of the KMT in the 2016 elections.

== Early life and education ==
Hung was born on 7 April 1948. She was the second child in her family. Her father, Hung Zi-yu (洪子瑜), had worked for a government monopoly bureau in mainland China before moving to Taiwan in 1946, where he became deputy manager of a sugar factory. During the White Terror, he was implicated in an alleged communist espionage case and was imprisoned on Green Island for three years. After his release, his status as a former political prisoner made it difficult for him to obtain employment, leaving the family dependent largely on the earnings of Hung's mother. Her mother supported the household by pawning jewelry from her wedding dowry to meet the family's expenses. Because of the family's poverty, Hung's siblings were temporarily placed in the care of other households.

Hung attended Dongyuan Elementary School in Taipei, where she began to participate in public speaking competitions. In 1958, while attending elementary school, she attracted news coverage for her performance in a children's storytelling competition. The Zhengxin News, a predecessor of the China Times, described her as a young girl with a talent for speaking. She later graduated from Taipei Municipal Zhongshan Girls High School. As a high school student, she joined the Kuomintang.

After high school, Hung studied law at Chinese Culture University. As an undergraduate, she earned a scholarship to fund her studies and defrayed her college expenses by also working part-time. The university's founder, Chang Chi-yun, authorized a waiver of her tuition in recognition of her academic performance. She graduated with her Bachelor of Laws (LL.B.) degree in 1970.

Later, Hung began postgraduate studies in education at National Taiwan Normal University. In 1991, she earned a Master of Arts degree in educational administration from Truman State University in the United States.

== Early career ==
Following her graduation, Hung pursued a career in secondary education rather than entering legal practice. With the assistance of her former teachers, she obtained a teaching position and became director of student discipline at Xiufeng Junior High School in Xizhi at the age of 23.

In 1980, she met Song Shi-xuan, head of the KMT's Taiwan Provincial Branch, who enlisted her as a leader of the branch's women's division of Taipei County until 1986. She also served three years at the party headquarters in Taipei and as editor for KMT Taiwan Province Department in 1986-1990. With many years of party experience under her belt, Hung began to seek the party's nomination for the National Assembly, but the KMT's Deputy Secretary-General, Guan Zhong, encouraged her to run for the Legislative Yuan instead.

== Political career ==
=== Legislative Yuan ===
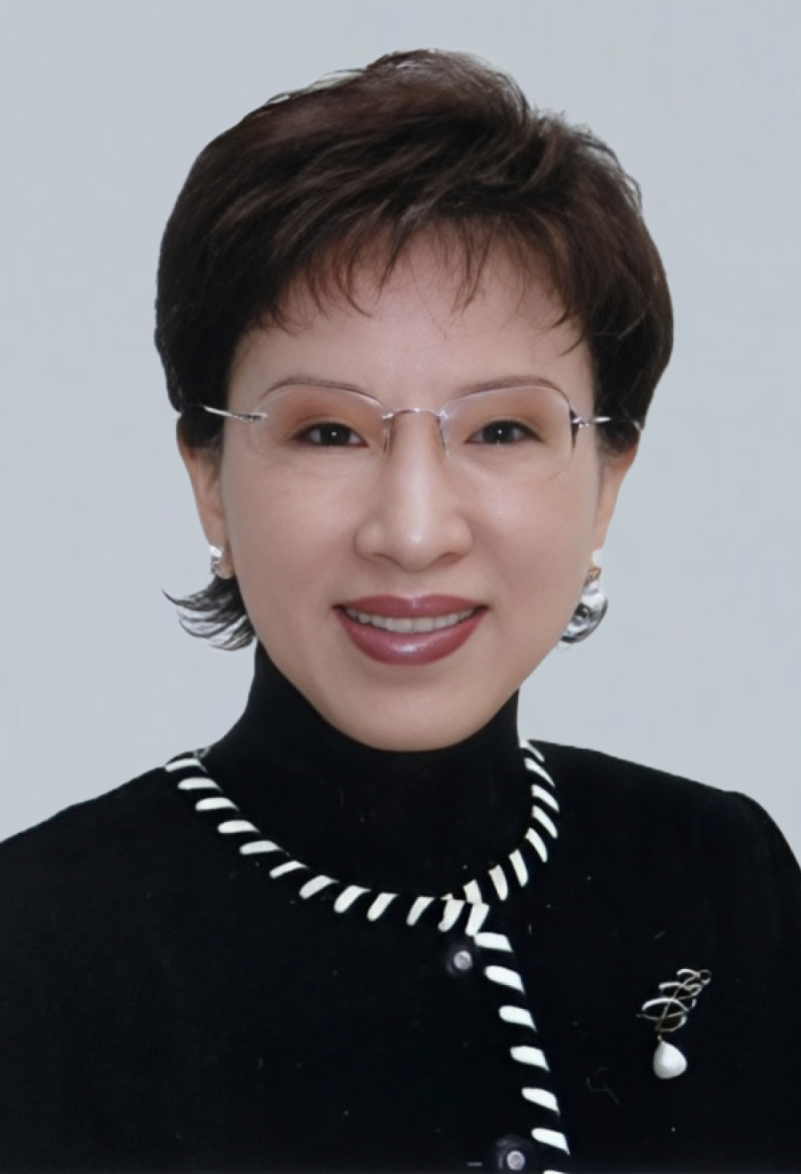
Official portrait, 2012

Hung entered her first Legislative Election campaign in 1989. Her KMT branch director objected to her request, and therefore did not give her time off during the campaign. Hung insisted on entering the primary and was only able to participate in the events on weekends as a candidate. She had her cousin go to the events on weekdays and hold up her poster whenever her name was called as a silent protest of her helpless absence. This was widely reported by the media and Hung won the primary by marginal votes, and thus was nominated by the party. Hung said, "My father passed away the moment when I won the primary. It seemed that he was waiting for the final confirmation. I was whispering in his ear, 'Bless me with the nomination if you want me to embark on my career in this path of politics.'" Hung subsequently won the seat in the legislative election and began her career in the Legislative Yuan for eight consecutive terms.

Hung almost lost her second election term of Legislative Yuan on 19 December 1992 to Jaw Shaw-kong in the same constituency. Hung had joined in 1989 new secondary political coalition within the KMT, but the coalition parted from KMT to form the New Party in 1993 and Hung decided to stay with the original KMT.

Hung was elected again in the third election term on 2 December 1995 of the legislative campaign. Taipei County was divided into three constituencies during the fourth election term on 5 December 1998 with too many candidates, therefore Hung transferred to the party list and was elected again. She again beat the People First Party in the fifth election term on 1 December 2001 and won by marginal votes. Hung ranked first in polls in the sixth election term on 11 December 2004 and won with the second highest number of votes.

She was again elected to the Legislative Yuan as a party list member in the seventh election term on 12 January 2008. In August 2008, she revealed secret accounts held abroad by former President Chen Shui-bian to the public which infuriated Chen's supporters. Hung won the election again in the eighth election term on 14 January 2012.

Hung has been on the Education and Culture Committee in the Legislative Yuan for many years.

=== 2007 Kuomintang chairmanship election ===
On 27 April 2007, Hung joined the KMT chairmanship election, going against former acting KMT Chairman Wu Po-hsiung. She eventually lost to Wu with 13.0% of the votes to Wu's 87.0%.

Candidate	Total votes cast	Percentage of vote
Wu Poh-hsiung	156,499	87.0%
Hung Hsiu-chu	23,447	13.0%
Voter turnout	53%

=== KMT vice chairmanship ===
Hung was appointed Vice Chairperson of KMT by the KMT Central Standing Committee on 15 February 2012 when the former Vice Chairman Tseng Yung-chuan resigned.

=== 2014 local elections ===
KMT lost majority of the seats in the local elections on 29 November 2014, resulting in the resignation of Party Chairman Ma Ying-jeou, with both first and second Vice Chairmen declined the acting position. Wu Den-yih was nominated to be the acting Chairman and Hung became the acting Secretary-General by the Central Committee on 3 December 2014. Eric Chu became the new Party Chairman after winning the party chairmanship election on 17 January 2015 unopposed. Hung was released from the position thereafter on 18 January 2015.

=== 2016 KMT chairmanship election ===
2016 Kuomintang chairmanship election
No.	Candidate	Party	Votes	Percentage	Result
1	Hung Hsiu-chu	Kuomintang	78,829	56.16%	
2	Huang Min-hui	Kuomintang	46,341	33.02%	
3	Lee Hsin	Kuomintang	7,604	5.42%	
4	Apollo Chen	Kuomintang	6,784	4.83%	
Total votes			337,351		
Turnout			41.61%		

== Other careers ==
Hung has been the director of the ROC Children and Youth Welfare Association, chairperson of Chinese Youth Care Association, chairperson of ROC Tug of War Association (subsequently Chinese Taipei Tug of War Association), chairperson of Chinese Love Alliance of Care for the Weak, deputy director of Youth Work Association, deputy director of Women Work Association, chairperson of Chinese Care of Disadvantaged Groups Alliance, chairperson of ROC World Federation of Folk Dance, president of ROC Foundation of Kidney Prevention and general-counsel of ROC Sports Federation.

== Legislative Yuan vice presidency ==
=== Vice presidency appointment ===
After her election for vice presidency of Legislative Yuan in 2012 by an overwhelming 69 votes, Hung said that she was familiar with the situation at the Legislative Yuan, and that respecting and abiding by the regulations within Legislative Yuan was really important. She made ROC history being the first woman elected to the post and took office on 1 February 2012.

=== 4th Straits Forum ===
During the opening remark of the 4th Straits Forum held in Xiamen, Fujian, in June 2012, Hung, in her capacity as Vice Chairperson of KMT, said that although mainland China was bigger and stronger, the greatest appeal that mainland China has for Taiwan is not only growing competitiveness, but also respect and goodwill given to the people of Taiwan.

=== 6th Straits Forum ===
During the opening remarks of the 6th Straits Forum held in Xiamen, Fujian in June 2014, Hung said that she hoped that both sides will cherish their increasingly close links and continue mutual dialogue and exchanges, because by doing so it will be possible to inject a new energy into cross-strait relations. She added that the forum remains full of enthusiasm and vitality despite the recent setback on the signing of the Cross-Strait Service Trade Agreement from the Sunflower Student Movement. She did acknowledge the widening gap between the rich and the poor in Taiwan as well as the younger generations dissatisfaction towards the government that also exist in many other countries due to the global trend of moving towards free trade. She said that the government would be more open and tolerant to negotiate with the public and take challenges.

== 2016 presidential campaign ==
=== KMT presidential primary ===
On 20 April 2015, Hung registered for the KMT presidential primary held prior to the 2016 presidential elections. She pledged for fair and open election process under a democratic mechanism. Hung passed the 30% approval rating threshold in three KMT presidential primary polls on 14 June 2015, with an average approval rating of 46.20%. She was officially nominated as the KMT presidential candidate during the National Party Congress on 19 July 2015 at Sun Yat-sen Memorial Hall in Taipei. During her speech, she promised peace, openness, equal distribution of wealth and morality to the people of Taiwan if she were elected. She would also push for a peaceful cross-strait relations based on the 1992 Consensus.

=== Presidential campaign ===
Hung started her campaign in Taichung on 23 July 2015. During an interview with a local radio station, Hung stated she would take the interests of the people into account, as well as the ROC constitution, when making decisions. She promised to sign a peace agreement that would improve military trust between Taiwan and China. She hoped that the mainland will allow Taiwan more opportunities to join international organizations and thereby boost its regional economic strength. She also pledged to improve the economy through job creation and build a just and equal society. Hung's campaign has been compared to the New Party's pro-Chinese unification stance. Her China policy, known as "one China, same interpretation," aims to have the People's Republic of China recognize the government of the Republic of China without recognizing the ROC as a state. President Ma Ying-jeou has supported this view, calling it no different from his own "one China, different interpretation" based on the 1992 consensus, though Kuomintang chairman Eric Chu has opposed it. Hung's run for president had been continually beset by rumors that she would withdraw from the race prior to the elections, an action Hung denied considering. On 26 July 2015, the spokesperson of Hung's campaign team Jack Yu (游梓翔) said that he would tender his resignation on 1 August 2015 to return to his teaching position at Shih Hsin University. However, he stayed on as adviser to Hung's public and media relations team. With a KMT-sanctioned poll revealing that Hung's support was at 13% in early October 2015, Central Standing Committee member Chiang Shuo-ping proposed a party congress be called to review Hung's candidacy. Due to her poor performance in polls, 91% of delegates at the congress, held on 17 October, chose to replace Hung as KMT presidential candidate. KMT chairman Eric Chu was selected as the replacement candidate. Hundreds of Hung's supporters gathered outside Sun Yat-sen Memorial Hall to protest the party congress being held inside the building. On 22 October, Hung announced that she would return all campaign contributions made since 23 September, a total of NT$11.83 million, to 2,633 donors.

After her presidential campaign came to a close, New Party chairman Yok Mu-ming attempted to convince Hung to switch parties and run for the legislature as a New Party candidate. Hung rejected this offer in November 2015, announcing her intention to stay with the KMT, but not to run a legislative reelection campaign in 2016. Hung later wrote a book about her presidential campaign, titled Unfinished Presidential Road. In December, Chu invited Hung to lead the group of advisers he had assembled for his campaign.

== Kuomintang chairmanship ==
Chu lost the presidential election, and subsequently resigned his post as KMT chair. On 19 January 2016, Hung announced that she would run for the position. On 22 February, Hung submitted the signatures of 84,822 party members in support of her candidacy. She was confirmed as a candidate four days later, having collected 38,407 valid signatures. Hung won 78,829 votes in the leadership election, and became the first elected chairwoman of the party.

On 30 October 2016, Hung led a delegation to attend the 11th Cross-strait Peace Development Forum which was held on 2–3 November in Beijing. The delegation included Jason Hu, Steve Chan, Huang Ching-hsien (黃清賢), Alex Tsai, Chang Jung-kung (張榮恭) and Wu Bi-chu (吳碧珠). She met with General Secretary of the Chinese Communist Party Xi Jinping in her capacity as the Kuomintang chairperson.

Hung was the first to declare her candidacy for the 2017 KMT chair election. She finished second to Wu Den-yih.

2017 Kuomintang chairmanship election
No.	Candidate	Party	Votes	Percentage
1	Wu Den-yih	Kuomintang	144,408	52.24%
2	Hung Hsiu-chu	Kuomintang	53,063	19.20%
3	Hau Lung-pin	Kuomintang	44,301	16.03%
4	Han Kuo-yu	Kuomintang	16,141	5.84%
5	Steve Chan	Kuomintang	12,332	4.46%
6	Tina Pan	Kuomintang	2,437	0.88%
Eligible voters			476,147	
Total votes			276,423	
Valid votes			272,682	
Invalid votes			3,741	
Turnout			58.05%	

== Later political career ==
In August 2019, Hung stated that she would contest the 2020 Taiwan legislative election, in the newly formed Tainan sixth district. She was formally nominated by the Kuomintang in September but lost to Wang Ting-yu, a sitting legislator in a different district, in the election.

In 2022, Hung complimented Chinese anti-terrorism efforts in Xinjiang, which some consider to constitute human rights violations. She accused the United States of fabricating lies about Chinese repression of Uyghurs in Xinjiang while on a trip sponsored by the Chinese government, claiming "The US and some Western countries have fabricated lies about the so-called 'forced labor' and 'genocide' in Xinjiang to undermine China's internal unity." Hung's remarks were heavily criticized in Taiwan. In November 2025, amidst the China–Japan diplomatic crisis, Hung criticized Japanese Prime Minister Sanae Takaichi's statement regarding a potential military action regarding Taiwan, saying that Taiwan was "no longer Japan's colony" and that Takaichi was "overreaching" and "reckless".

== Personal life ==
Hung is nicknamed the little hot pepper (Chinese: 小辣椒; pinyin: Xiǎo Làjiāo) for her straightforward manner, She has been compared several times to former Alaska Governor Sarah Palin.

Party political offices
Preceded by Tseng Yung-chuan	Secretary-General of the Kuomintang; Acting; 2014–2015	Succeeded by Lee Shu-chuan
Preceded by Ma Ying-jeou	Kuomintang nominee for President of the Republic of China; Withdrew; 2016	Succeeded by Eric Chu
Preceded by Huang Min-hui; Acting	Chairwoman of the Kuomintang; 2016–2017	Succeeded by Lin Junq-tzer; Acting
