= Jhongli Station =

Jhongli Station might refer to following train stations in Taiwan:

- Jhongli Station (Taoyuan County)：A train station along Taiwan Railway Western Mainline Line.
- Jhongli Station (Yilan County):A train station along Taiwan Railway Yilan Line.
