= Uniform Map =

Taiwanese school uniform website

Uniform Map (Chinese: 制服地圖) was a website of school uniforms, established in 2013 and closed in 2025, the website was based on Google Maps. Uniform Map has collected information of school uniforms around the world, some information of uniforms in animation, and some introductions related to uniforms.

== Introduction ==
Uniform Map was an experimental website which based on Google Maps, the founder wanted to sort out information of school uniforms of senior high schools in Taiwan, combined the collection of these information with Google Maps, then the website was established. Afterwards, it started collecting information of school uniforms around the world. As of June 2022, Uniform Map has collected over 20 uniform map themes in all 5 continents in the world, and collected school uniform information of over 10,000 schools.

The website started collecting uniforms of animations since 2016.

== Countries ==
Uniform Map was established in May 2013. First it collecting uniforms of all senior high schools in Taiwan, then of all junior high schools in Taiwan. Then it developed similar collections for Hong Kong, Macau, Malaysia and Singapore. After completed the collection of these countries, the it expanded the collection to Japan, South Korea, Australia and New Zealand, etc, from the end of 2015 to start of 2016. Then it started collecting school uniform information of United Kingdom, where the school uniform originated, and then it also collected school uniform information of United States, Canada, South Africa, etc. Nowadays (counted to September 2018), The Uniform Map had developed uniform maps of 24 countries, collected school uniform pictures of over 10,000 schools around the world. Uniform maps of senior high schools in Taiwan, junior high schools in Taiwan, high schools in Hong Kong, Macau, Singapore, Australia, New Zealand and senior high schools in Japan has totally completed.

On September 6, 2018, Uniform Map had collected school uniform of 10,000 schools around the world.

Statistics of Uniform Map in Every Countries (Updated at June 6, 2021)
Uniform Map (Countries)	Establish Date	Amounts of Collected Schools	Notes
Taiwan (Senior High Schools)	May 1, 2013	555	The collection totally completed on August 2, 2013
Taiwan (Junior High Schools)	September 24, 2014	809	The collection totally completed on June 11, 2015
Taiwan (Elementary Schools)	March 7, 2017	437	
Japan (Senior High Schools)	January 8, 2016	4751	The collection totally completed on August 2, 2020
Japan (Junior High Schools)	January 21, 2016	1128	
South Korea (Senior High Schools)	December 5, 2015	160	
South Korea (Junior High Schools)	June 7, 2016	20	
Hong Kong (High Schools)	February 5, 2014	483	The collection totally completed on October 29, 2015
Hong Kong (Elementary Schools)	August 22, 2017	114	
Macau	October 22, 2015	43	The collection totally completed on November 18, 2015
China	June 26, 2016	87	
Philippines	December 31, 2015	189	
Vietnam	May 19, 2018	6	
Thailand	May 27, 2016	26	
Malaysia	March 6, 2015	483	
Brunei	July 18, 2015	18	
Singapore	October 21, 2015	176	The collection totally completed on January 30, 2016
Indonesia	November 15, 2015	37	
Australia	November 21, 2015	2078	The collection totally completed on May 8, 2015
New Zealand	November 25, 2015	386	The collection totally completed on March 25, 2016.
United Kingdom	February 14, 2016	3070	
Ireland	February 29, 2016	160	
France	January 19, 2019	4	
Spain	February 5, 2017	6	
Portugal	February 26, 2016	3	
United States of America	December 31, 2016	159	
Canada	March 6, 2016	116	
Argentina	December 19, 2017	3	
Chile	October 22, 2017	4	
Colombia	2020	3	
South Africa	March 10, 2016	552	

== Uniform Contest ==
=== 1st Annual Uniform Contest (2014) ===
On 2014, the Uniform Map held the "Taiwan School Uniform Contest", people could vote for the best school uniform in their minds by login their Facebook account. Yongping Vocational High School from Taoyuan City won the champion of 1st Annual Uniform Contest by obtained the most votes.

1st Annual Uniform Contest Results
Rank	School	City/County
1	Yongping Vocational High School	Taoyuan City
2	Chih Ping Senior High School	Taoyuan City
3	Chi-Ying Senior High School	Taoyuan City
4	National Chia-Chi Girls' Senior High School	Tainan City
5	Kao-Yuan Vocational High School of Technology & Commerce	Kaohsiung City
6	Zhongli Senior High School	Taoyuan City
7	National Hsinchu Senior Industrial Vocational School	Hsinchu City
8	Taichung Municipal Wen-Hua Senior High School	Taichung City
9	National Chupei Senior High School	Hsinchu County
10	National Keelung Girls' Senior High School	Keelung City

=== 2nd Annual Uniform Contest (2015) ===
On 2015, the "Taiwan School Uniform Contest" consists of 3 events, including "Best Sailor Suit Uniform Contest", "Best Checkered Skirt Uniform Contest" and "Overall Uniform Contest". National Chia-Chi Girls' Senior High School won the champion of "Best Sailor Suit Uniform Contest". Nan Ying Senior Commercial & Industrial Vocational School won the champion of "Best Checkered Skirt Uniform Contest" . Kao-Yuan Vocational High School of Technology & Commerce won the champion of 2nd Annual Uniform Contest.

2nd Annual Uniform Contest Results
Rank	School	City/County	
1	Kao-Yuan Vocational High School of Technology & Commerce	Kaohsiung City	
2	National Chia-Chi Girls' Senior High School	Tainan City	Champion of "Best Sailor Suit Uniform Contest"
3	Chih Ping Senior High School	Taoyuan City	
4	DaoJiang High School of Nursing & Home Economics	Taipei City	
5	Ku-Pao Home Economics & Commercial High School	New Taipei City	
6	Taipei First Girls' High School	Taipei City	
7	Keelung Maritime Senior High School	Keelung City	
8	Kuang-Fu Senior High School	Hsinchu City	
9	Juang Jing Vocational High School	New Taipei City	
10	Shu-Te Home-Economics & Commercial High School	Kaohsiung City	

The score consists of Voting (50%), Page Views (by Google Analytics, 10%) and Reviewer's Scores (40%).

=== 3rd Annual Uniform Contest (2016) ===
On 2016, the 3rd Annual "Taiwan School Uniform Contest" splits into Preliminary Contest and Final Contest, top 12 schools with most votes could advances to the Finals.

In the Finals, the contest consists of "Best Uniform", "Best Girls' Uniform" and "Best Boys' Uniform". National Chia-Chi Girls' Senior High School won both champions of "Best Uniform" and "Best Girls' Uniform", Nan Ying Senior Commercial & Industrial Vocational School won the champion of "Best Boys' Uniform".

3rd Annual Uniform Contest Results
Final Rank	School	City/County	Preliminary Rank	
1	National Chia-Chi Girls' Senior High School	Tainan City	2	Both champions of "Best Uniform" and "Best Girls' Uniform"
2	Dong Wu Senior Industrial Home Economics Vocational High School	Chiayi City	6	
3	National Pingbei Senior High School	Pingtung County	7	
4	Kao-Yuan Vocational High School of Technology & Commerce	Kaohsiung City	1	
5	Nan Ying Senior Commercial & Industrial Vocational School	Tainan City	3	Champion of "Best Boys' Uniform"
6	Tamkang High School	New Taipei City	9	
7	Taipei Municipal Zhong Shan Girls' High School	Taipei City	11	
8	National Kaohsiung Normal University Affiliated Senior High School	Kaohsiung City	4	
9	Taipei Municipal Jingmei Girls' High School	Taipei City	10	
10	Chih Ping Senior High School	Taoyuan City	5	
11	Taipei First Girls' High School	Taipei City	8	
12	Taichung Municipal Chang-Yie Senior High School	Taichung City	12	

=== 4th Annual Uniform Contest (2017) ===
On 2017

=== 5th Annual Uniform Contest (2018) ===
On 2018

== Controversy ==
On March 7, 2025, Uniform Map was discovered to have misappropriated a large number of photos of female students. On March 8, Uniform Map issued an announcement stating that unauthorized accounts had uploaded the misappropriated photos without consent; the website had deleted the photos and apologized to those affected. The website is currently closed. On March 8, the Criminal Police Corps of the New Taipei City Police Department summoned the website's founder, Jiang Shun-chih, for questioning. On March 9, the case was transferred to the New Taipei District Prosecutors Office for investigation on suspicion of offenses against public morality, violations of the Copyright Act, and the Personal Data Protection Act.

Jiang Shun-chih accepted an interview with BBC News Chinese, stating that the photos on Uniform Map primarily came from user submissions and that the website did not have a moderation mechanism. In the past, if a subject requested the removal of a photo, he would handle it immediately, so he was unaware of the potential risks. He admitted to "major negligence" regarding copyright and portrait rights and stated that he had paid less attention to Uniform Map in recent years, not expecting the matter to spark such controversy. He revealed that before Uniform Map closed, it had over 100,000 members and about 90,000 photos on the site, but uploaders could choose not to provide source information, making the origin of some photos unclear. He emphasized that the original design of Uniform Map was "to facilitate the recording of school uniforms" and did not consider the potential infringement of personal privacy.

On March 10, Jiang Shun-chih published a statement on his personal blog under the online alias "Red Reaper." In the article, he reviewed the original intention of founding Uniform Map, emphasizing that early photos came from public sources and that he subsequently obtained authorization and established a mechanism for photo removal. He believed that this incident might have been caused by malicious uploads of controversial content, which led to intensified community criticism and evolved into personal attacks. Facing outside accusations, he denied the relevant charges and stated that he was being smeared by false public opinion online. Ultimately, he decided to permanently close Uniform Map and apologized to the affected individuals and schools.

In addition, Jiang Shun-chih wrote his master's thesis using Uniform Map as the subject, which further triggered a controversy regarding academic ethics. Since the research involved unauthorized photos of minor students, the Ministry of Education of the Republic of China sent a letter to the National Taipei University of Education requesting an investigation into whether the thesis complied with academic standards. According to Jiang Shun-chih, he received notification on November 20 that both the ethics review committee and the Ministry of Education had recognized the thesis as having no issues.

On March 13, the Education and Culture Committee of the Legislative Yuan reviewed the draft of the "Youth Basic Law," and several legislators focused on the controversies related to Uniform Map. Democratic Progressive Party legislator Chen Hsiu-pao stated that the Ministry of Education should require local governments to conduct follow-up tracking and provide appropriate relief channels for victimized students. Deputy Minister of Education Ye Ping-cheng stated that any research involving the information of others must undergo formal application and review.。

On June 25, Jiang Shun-chih received a notice of non-prosecution regarding the Uniform Map incident.

On October 25, Jiang Shun-chih announced in a post on his personal blog under the alias "Red Reaper" that Uniform Map was back online, but the overall code had been completely rewritten and rebuilt using the Laravel framework. The article pointed out that original images might involve facial recognition and privacy issues, so Uniform Map would process them using artificial intelligence technology. At the same time, Uniform Map would no longer provide image hosting functions, shifting instead toward a "historical record and uniform encyclopedia" direction to reduce hosting space and operational cost pressures. Furthermore, Jiang Shun-chih expressed his views on the past controversies of Uniform Map and emphasized that he would file lawsuits against those spreading false information.

On December 16, Jiang Shun-chih released a summary statement regarding the entire incident. He pointed out that in the early years, most photos on the website were provided by netizens or photographers and were removed immediately upon receiving feedback. He emphasized that he had only cooperated with the police for questioning and was never arrested or detained; furthermore, the related cases filed against him ultimately resulted in a non-prosecution disposition by the prosecutor. Regarding the controversy over his master's thesis, he stated that it had been recognized as issue-free by the Ministry of Education and the ethics review committee. Additionally, addressing the defamatory accusations on social media platforms, he has collected evidence and is preparing to take legal action. Regarding the future development of the website, he announced that in order to completely avoid controversy, the website architecture has been entirely rewritten, and it will primarily feature AI-generated image content in the future.
