= Nanya (disambiguation) =

Nanya (c.1835 – 1895) was an Australian aboriginal man.

Nanya may also refer to :

- Nanya Night Market, a market in Taiwan
- Nanya Technology Corporation, a Taiwanese semiconductor (DRAM) manufacturer and subsidiary of Formosa Plastics Group
- Nanya Institute of Technology, a private college in Taiwan
- Nanya River, a river in Sichuan, China; tributary of the Yangtze

== See also ==
- Nanaya, a Mesopotamian goddess
- Nanayam, a 1983 Indian film
