= Action Museum =

Museum in Zhongli, Taoyuan City, Taiwan

- 憶聲電子文物館
- Location: Zhongli, Taoyuan City, Taiwan
- Coordinates: 24°59′12.3″N 121°14′22.3″E
- Type: museum
- Owners: Action Electronics Co., Ltd.

The Action Museum (traditional Chinese: 憶聲電子文物館; simplified Chinese: 忆声电子文物馆; pinyin: Yìshēng Diànzǐ Wénwùguǎn) is a museum in Zhongli District, Taoyuan City, Taiwan. The museum is owned by Action Electronics Co., Ltd.

== History ==
The museum exhibits electronic component progress and development used in Taiwan industries over the past 30 years.

== Architecture ==
The museum spans over an area of 300 m^{2} and located at the ground floor of Action Electronics Co., Ltd. headquarter building.

== Exhibitions ==
The museum is divided into five exhibition areas, such as historical area, historical exhibit area and product demonstration area.

== Transportation ==
The museum is accessible east of Xingnan Station of Taoyuan Metro.

== See also ==
- List of museums in Taiwan
