= List of busiest railway stations in Taiwan =

This article consists of the busiest railway stations in Republic of China (Taiwan), with the statistics being taken from the official data of the years 2020. Ridership numbers are for Inter-city rail systems, Taiwan Railways Administration (TRA) and Taiwan High Speed Rail (THSR) only, other rail transport like MRT are not included.

== TRA ==
Only the top 20 busiest TRA stations are shown.

Rank (2020)	Rank (2019)	Change	Station	Photograph	Annual entries	Annual exits	Daily entries/exits	Line	Location
1	1	0	Taipei		18,701,149	18,379,806	101,314	West coast	Taipei
2	2	0	Taoyuan		9,122,178	9,373,039	50,533	West coast	Taoyuan
3	3	0	Zhongli		8,621,536	8,733,022	47,417	West coast	Taoyuan
4	4	0	Tainan		8,189,000	8,352,132	45,194	West coast	Tainan
5	5	0	Taichung		8,003,936	8,066,308	43,908	Taichung	Taichung
6	6	0	Banqiao		7,431,888	7,407,874	40,546	West coast	New Taipei
7	7	0	Hsinchu		6,411,637	6,444,524	35,126	West coast/Neiwan	Hsinchu City
8	9	▲1	Songshan		5,360,304	5,342,014	29,241	West coast	Taipei
9	11	▲2	Shulin		4,858,909	4,904,742	26,677	West coast	New Taipei
10	8	▼2	Kaohsiung		4,840,110	4,829,247	26,419	West coast	Kaohsiung
11	10	▼1	Changhua		4,514,064	4,618,234	24,952	Taichung/West coast	Changhua
12	15	▲3	Nangang		3,722,618	3,912,500	20,861	West coast	Taipei
13	13	0	New Zuoying		3,560,488	3,546,030	19,417	West coast	Kaohsiung
14	17	▲3	Xizhi		3,446,769	3,565,202	19,158	West coast	New Taipei
15	12	▼3	Hualien		3,509,367	3,472,846	19,077	North-link/Taitung	Hualien
16	14	▼2	Pingtung		3,407,412	3,464,343	18,775	Pingtung	Pingtung
17	16	▼1	Chiayi		3,275,326	3,271,363	17,887	West coast	Chiayi City
18	19	▲1	Xike		3,218,308	3,226,319	17,608	West coast	New Taipei
19	18	▼1	Neili		3,129,293	3,070,076	16,938	West coast	Taoyuan
20	20	0	Yingge		2,879,622	2,893,762	15,774	West coast	New Taipei

== THSR ==
All 12 THSR stations are shown. Ridership numbers were decreased in 2020 due to COVID-19 outbreak.

Rank (2020)	Station	Photograph	Annual entries	Annual exits	Daily entries/exits	Change (2019-2020)	Growth rate	Location
1	Taipei		13,177,595	13,279,379	75,485	-14,071	-16.26%	Taipei
2	Taichung		9,496,305	9,427,100	51,845	-11,435	-18.07%	Taichung
3	Zuoying		7,724,730	7,714,462	42,300	-9,638	-18.56%	Kaohsiung
4	Taoyuan		5,741,854	5,845,729	31,747	-7,171	-18.43%	Taoyuan
5	Hsinchu		5,413,451	5,845,729	30,088	-3,790	-11.19%	Hsinchu County
6	Banqiao		4,303,559	4,304,217	23,583	-495	-2.06%	New Taipei
7	Tainan		3,652,977	3,634,920	19,967	-3,796	-15.97%	Tainan
8	Nangang		2,632,404	2,353,641	13,660	-976	-6.67%	Taipei
9	Chiayi		2,417,147	2,404,317	13,209	-2,357	-15.14%	Chiayi County
10	Yunlin		1,209,954	1,212,971	6,638	-973	-12.49%	Yunlin
11	Miaoli		846,256	860,468	4,676	-527	-10.14%	Miaoli
12	Changhua		622,920	632,998	3,441	-510	-12.90%	Changhua
