= HeySong Corporation =

Beverage company of Taiwan

HeySong Sarsaparilla

HeySong Corporation (Chinese: 黑松股份有限公司; pinyin: Hēisōng Gǔfèn Yǒuxiàn Gōngsī) is a well-known beverage producer in Taiwan. It was founded in 1925 as a family business, and later on grew into a large corporation.

== History ==
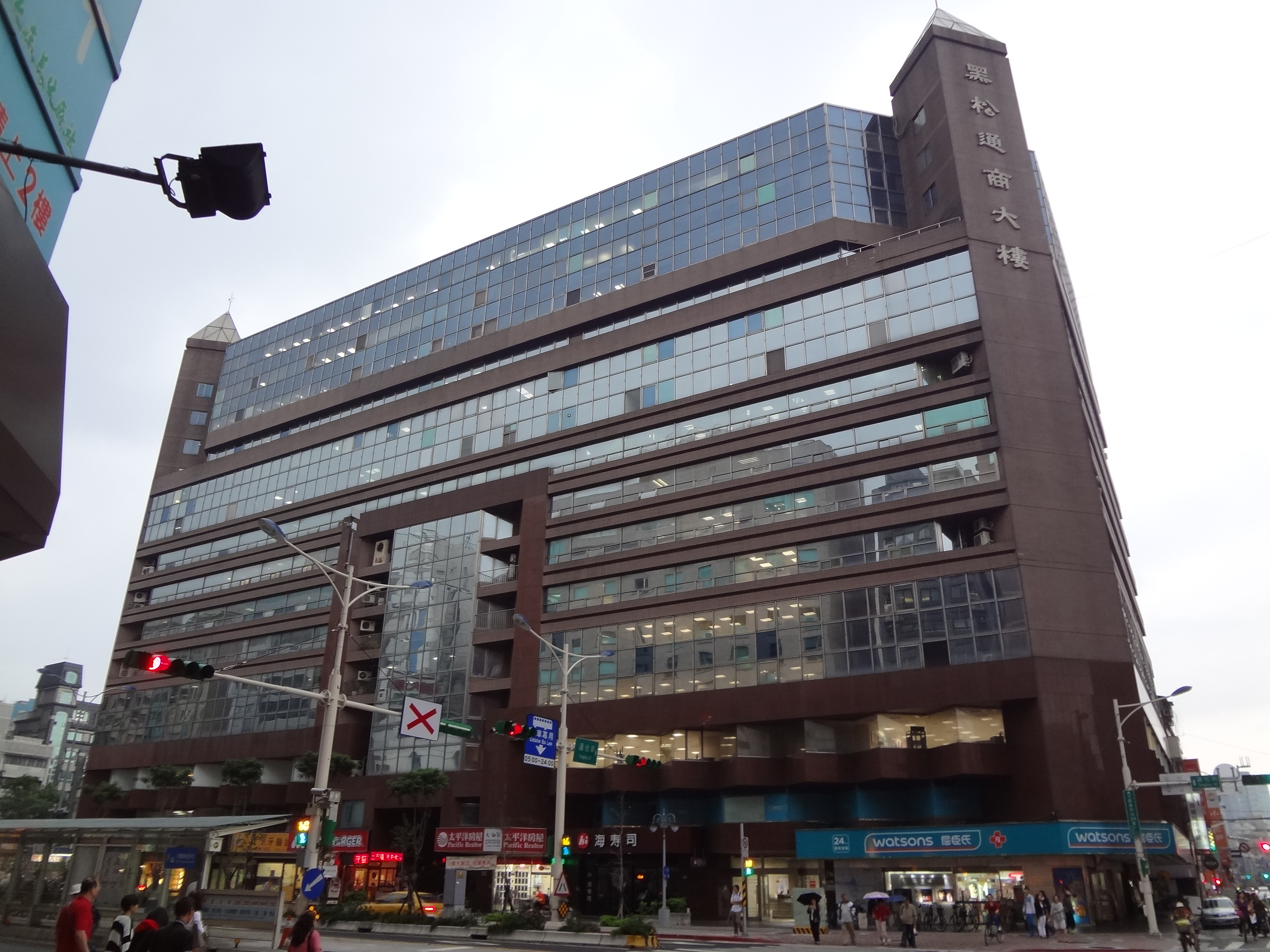
HeySong Commercial Building in Taipei

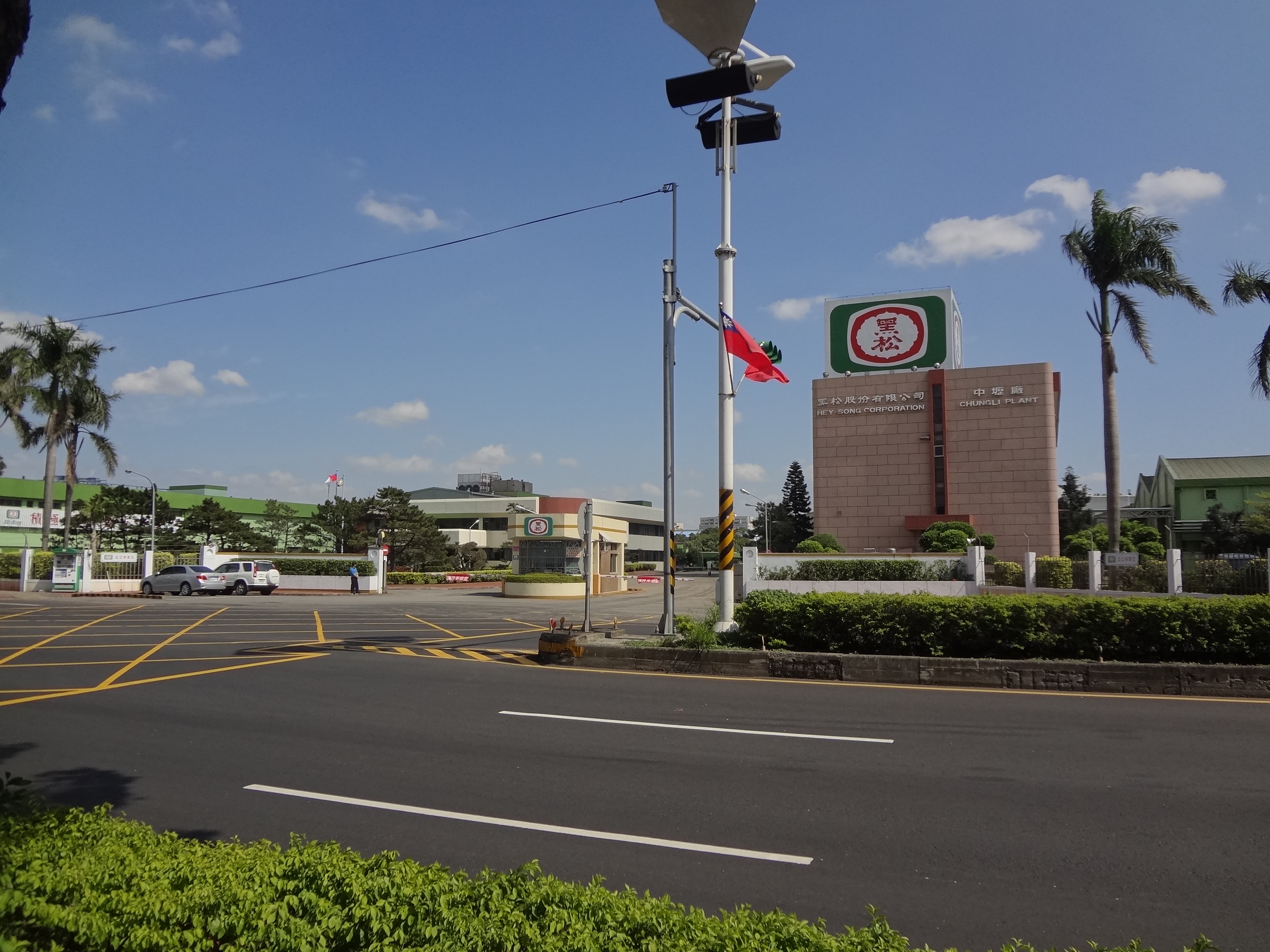
HeySong plant in Zhongli District, Taoyuan City

The first chairman of the corporation, Chang Wen-chi (張文杞), founded Jian Hsin Corporation Limited (進馨商會) in 1925 with six of his cousins, when Taiwan was still under Japanese rule, by buying a Japanese beverage producer in Taiwan named "Nikoniko" (Japanese: ニコニコ; Chinese: 尼可尼可). Under the Japanese industrial classification scheme Taiwanese businesses owned by Taiwanese were classified as third tier and were limited in their ability to charge higher prices or compete with Japanese companies. The company at first engaged in production of soda under the brands of "Fuji" (富士牌) and ramune under the brands of "Sanshou" (三手牌). The name "Fuji" is a Japanese word and meant the quality their products were as good as the Japanese ones. The name "Sanshou" literally meant "three hands" and signified the co-operation between the three families under the same clan within the company. It used the "HeySong" trademark to produce the "HeySong Soda" in 1931. HeySong's bottles and labeling were based on those used by high end sake. The most popular drink produced under the HeySong brand at the time was called “No-Beer.” In 1936 the company acquired a 3,500m2 plot in Taipei as the site for a new factory (this site was later redeveloped as Breeze Center). In 1938 the government took control of the bottling business under Japanese wartime regulations. Until the end of the war HeySong's beverage production was controlled by the government mandated Taiwan Cold Beverage Controlled Trade Association which received most of the profits from the business. Near the end of the war the government attempted to force a sale of the factory and production was negatively impacted by a successful American airstrike on a carbonic acid factory in Kaohsiung. Postwar production resumed in 1946.

One of their most well-known product, HeySong Sarsaparilla Drink, a kind of Sarsi, was put into market in 1950. HeySong captured the majority of the Taiwanese beverage market in the 1950s and 60s. In 1968 Coca-Cola entered the market, Coke believed that it could dominate HeySong within five years but underestimated how deeply integrated HeySong had become in Taiwan's culture. Later on, HeySong started to produce various kinds of beverage including sports drinks, teas, coffees, fruit drinks, and even alcohol. The Headquarters of the company moved from the Taipei plant (now known as the Breeze Center) into the HeySong Commercial Building (黑松通商大樓) on Xinyi Road, Taipei City in 1987.

The name of the company was changed from Chien Hsin Co. Ltd. to HeySong Beverages Co., Ltd. in 1970, and later on changed to the present name "HeySong Corporation" in 1981. The original English name of the company and the drinks change from "HeSung" to "HeySong" in 1974.

== Products ==
- HeySong Soda (黑松汽水)
- HeySong Sarsaparilla (黑松沙士)
- FIN Healthy-Support Drink
- Wincafe Coffee (韋恩咖啡)
- Biedermeier Coffee (畢德麥雅)
- Ocean Coffee
- Hey-Song Justea (就是茶)
- CHERICO Juice Drink (吉利果)
- Oasis Juice Drink (綠洲果汁)
- Barley Barony classic whisky (貝里經典威士忌)
- Barley Barony scotch whisky (貝里蘇格蘭威士忌)

== Museums ==
- HeySong Beverage Museum

== See also ==
- List of companies of Taiwan
