= Army Academy R.O.C. =

Army NCO academy in Zhongli, Taoyuan City, Taiwan

R.O.C. Army Academy
- 中華民國陸軍專科學校
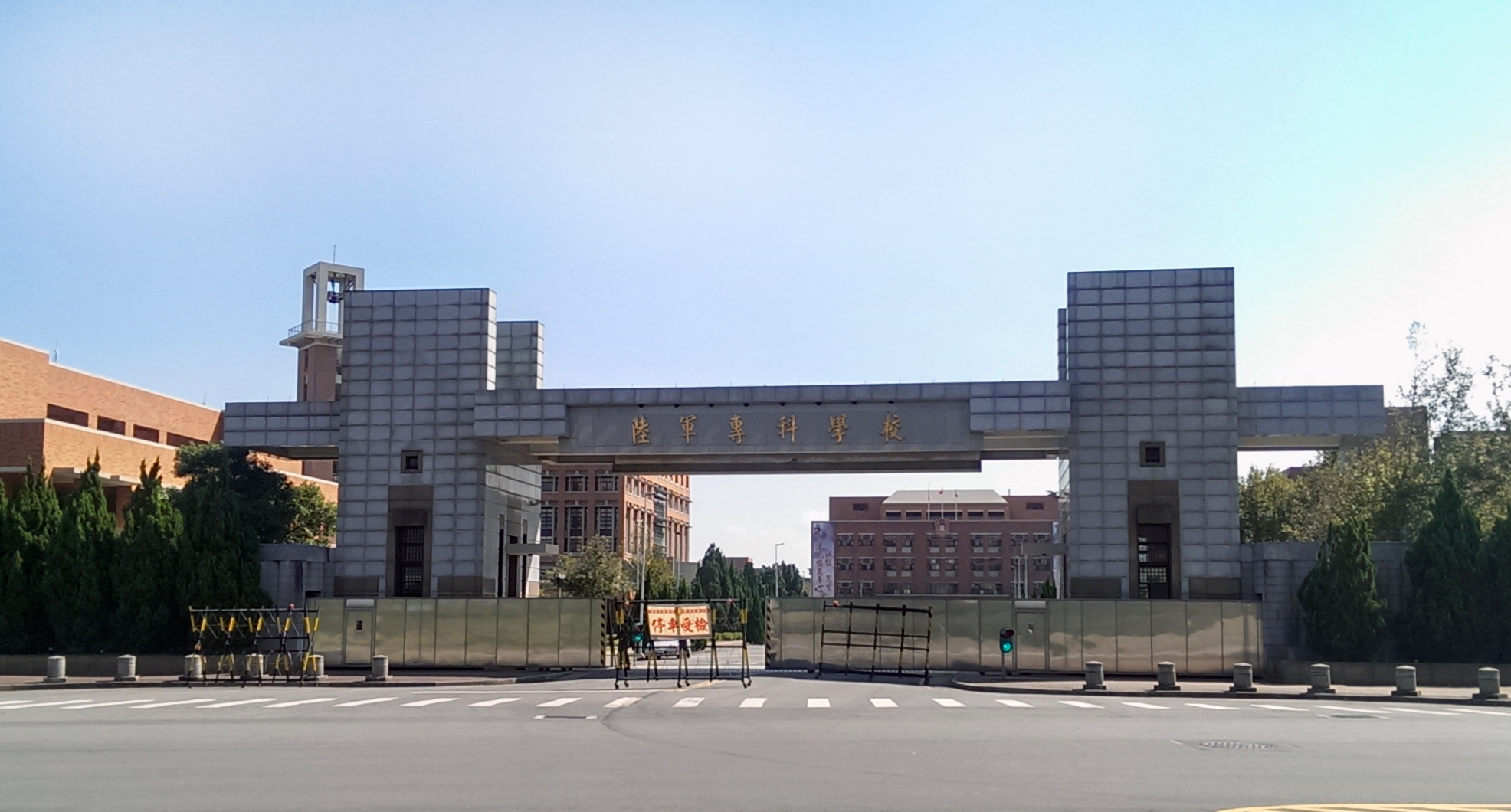
- Former names: ROC Army First Non-Commissioned Officers School
- Type: Military academy
- Established: 1957 (as ROCAFNCOS); August 2005 (as AAROC)
- Location: Zhongli, Taoyuan, Taiwan; 24°56′8″N 121°15′38″E
- Website: Official website

The Army Academy R.O.C. (AAROC; Chinese: 陸軍專科學校; Pe̍h-ōe-jī: Lio̍k-kun Choan-kho Ha̍k-hāu) is a military academy located in Zhongli District, Taoyuan City, Taiwan.

The academy offers a four-year program that covers a broad range of subjects, including military science, tactics, leadership, and physical fitness. In addition, students are required to take courses in mathematics, physics, chemistry, and other academic disciplines.

== History ==
The AAROC was initially established as the ROC Army First Non-Commissioned Officers School in 1957 by President Chiang Kai-shek. It was then further integrated itself with the Second and Third Non-Commissioned Officers Schools where its scale gradually expanded. In August 2005, the school was officially reformed as the Army Academy R.O.C..

== Faculties ==
- Aircraft Engineering Department
- Power Mechanical Engineering Department
- Electronic Engineering Department
- Computer Science and Communication Engineering Department
- Mechanical Engineering Department
- Chemical Engineering Department
- Vehicle Engineering Department
- Civil Engineering Department

== Transportation ==
The university is accessible South East from Zhongli Station of Taiwan Railway.

== See also ==
- List of universities in Taiwan
- Republic of China Army
