= Matsu New Village =

Military dependents' village in Zhongli, Taoyuan City, Taiwan

Matsu New Village 馬祖新村
- Military dependents' village
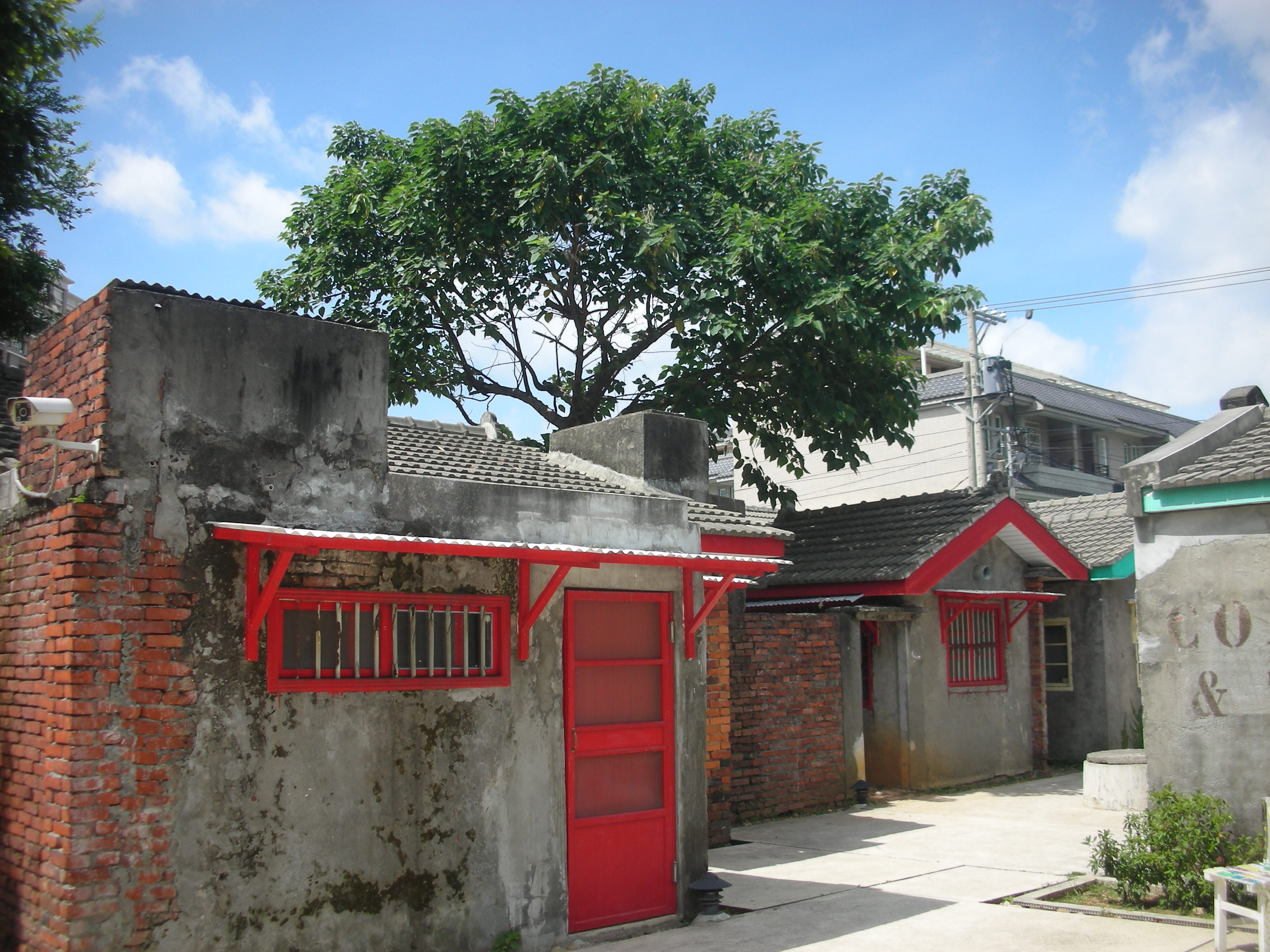
- Matsu New Village
- Interactive map of Matsu New Village
- Coordinates: 24°56′10″N 121°14′15″E
- Country: Taiwan
- City: Taoyuan
- District: Zhongli

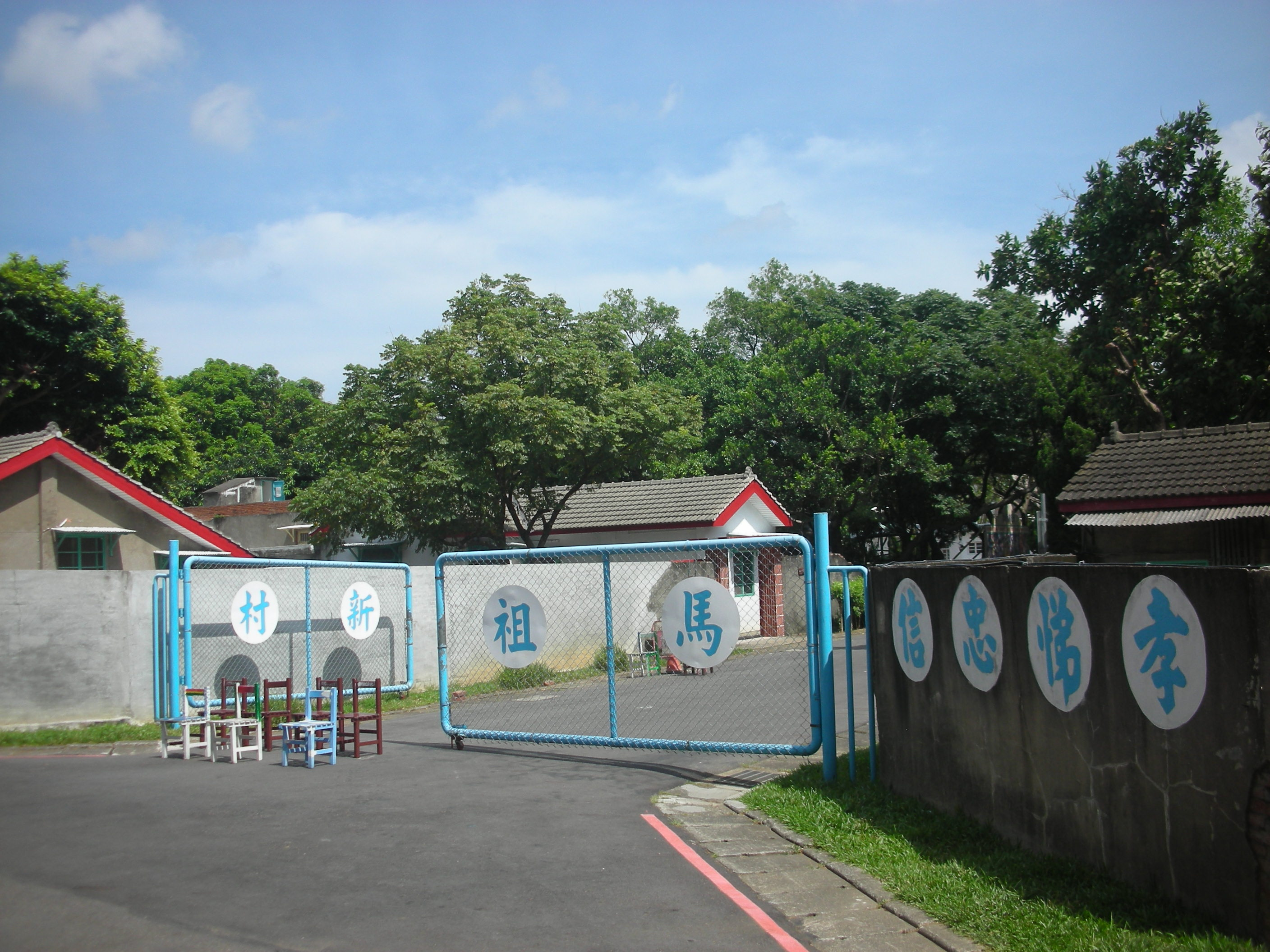
Entrance of Matsu New Village

The Matsu New Village (Chinese: 馬祖新村; pinyin: Mǎzǔ Xīncūn), also called New Matsu Village, Mazu New Village, is a restored military dependents' settlement in Zhongli District, Taoyuan City, Taiwan.

The Matsu New Village has been lauded as the "Taoyuan General Village" (Chinese: 桃園將軍村). The first phase of the military dependents' hostel was completed in 1957, and they are allocated to 84 army major-general level officers and lower ranking officers, as well as their dependents; it was also the first military dependents' village in Longgang. The name of the village was not derived because the local residents came from Matsu but it was during a trip when Chiang Kai-shek’s wife, Soong Mei-Ling led the Armed Forces Entertainment Regiment to visit Matsu and enhance troop morale.

Matsu New Village was the only village in Taoyuan to have been selected by the Ministry of National Defense in 2012 as one of the 13 national “Cultural Preservation Areas for Military Dependents’ Villages.”
