= Jawshing Arthur Liou =

American artist

- Born: June 13, 1968 (age 58); Zhongli City, Taoyuan County (now Zhongli District, Taoyuan City), Taiwan
- Education: National Chengchi University (BA); University of Florida (MFA)
- Known for: video art, electronic art, photography, new media art
- Notable work: "Kora", "Improbable Waves", "Blood Work", "Human-Cannabis"

Jawshing Arthur Liou (劉肇興; born June 13, 1968) is a Taiwanese-American digital artist whose work depicts spaces not probable in reality.

== Life and education ==
Liou was born in Zhongli District, Taoyuan. He completed a B.A. in journalism at National Chengchi University in Taipei, Taiwan, in 1990, and worked as a video journalist in Taiwan in the early 1990s before emigrating to the United States at age 25. He enrolled in graduate school and received an MFA in Photography and Electronic Intermedia from the University of Florida, Gainesville in 1998. While in Florida, Liou studied photography with the world-renowned Jerry Uelsmann. During this time Liou's work became more personal and organic, and his practice expanded to incorporate video.

== Career ==
=== Artworks ===
Liou's works are derived from source footage spanning many types of content. From the human body, to landscapes, to oil paint and food items, Liou's works are filled with rich details. He responds to the personal experiences of spiritual sanctuary, illness, searching, tragedy, and the spectacles in life. Liou's work is primarily based in extremely high resolution and exquisitely layered moving image composites, which he then shapes into large-scale installations for gallery spaces, or screens at experimental film and new media festivals. Stills taken from his video works are also printed and exhibited photographically.

=== Exhibitions ===
Liou's videos and prints have been exhibited and screened internationally, including in the United Kingdom, Taiwan, Canada, Japan, Sweden, Italy, Denmark, the Netherlands, Argentina, Brazil, as well as New York, Chicago, Houston, Miami, Atlanta, New Orleans, and Indianapolis. His works have also been featured at the New Media Caucus Showcase, College Art Association National Conference, (2013), SIGGRAPH conference in Vancouver (2011) and the European Biennial Conference of the Society for Science, Literature, and the Arts in Amsterdam (2006). Liou's massive installation, Kora, was exhibited at the Sharjah Biennial in the Emirate of Sharjah in the UAE.

=== Indiana University Bloomington ===
Liou is a Professor of Digital Art and the Director of School of Fine Arts at Indiana University, Bloomington. Liou began working as faculty there in 1999, where he founded the school's Digital Art program.

=== Representation ===
His work is represented by Chi-Wen Gallery, Taipei and Beaux-Arts des Amériques, Montréal.

=== Museum programs and collections ===
Liou's videos and prints are featured in numerous private and public programs and collections nationally and internationally, including but not limited to the following:

- The Museum of Fine Arts Houston
- The Indianapolis Museum of Art
- The Tokyo Metropolitan Museum of Photography
- Vehbi Koç Foundation, Istanbul
- The National Taiwan Museum of Fine Arts
- Hong-gah Museum
- The Museum of Contemporary Photography, Chicago
- Taipei Fine Arts Museum
- The Seoul Museum of Art
- Eskenazi Museum of Art at Indiana University
- Crystal Bridges Museum of American Art
- National Gallery of Victoria, Melbourne, Australia

== Prizes & awards ==
In 2014, Liou was one of 102 artists selected for the ambitious “State of the Art: Discovering American Art Now” exhibition at Crystal Bridges Museum of American Art. Liou was the only artist from Indiana to be represented.

Liou is the recipient of numerous additional awards and grants, including the Asian Cultural Council Grant, New York (2013); Efroymson Contemporary Arts Fellowship, Indianapolis (2010); Taipei Artist Village Residency, Taipei City Government, Taiwan (2010), Central Indiana Community Foundation, Indianapolis (2010); New Frontiers grants from Indiana University, Bloomington (2006, 2011); the Garry B. Fritz Award from the Society for Photographic Education National Conference, Chicago (2006); the Rising Star Award at Fotofusion, Palm Beach Photographic Center, Florida (2014).
