= Nanya Institute of Technology =

College in Zhongli, Taoyuan City, Taiwan

- 南亞技術學院
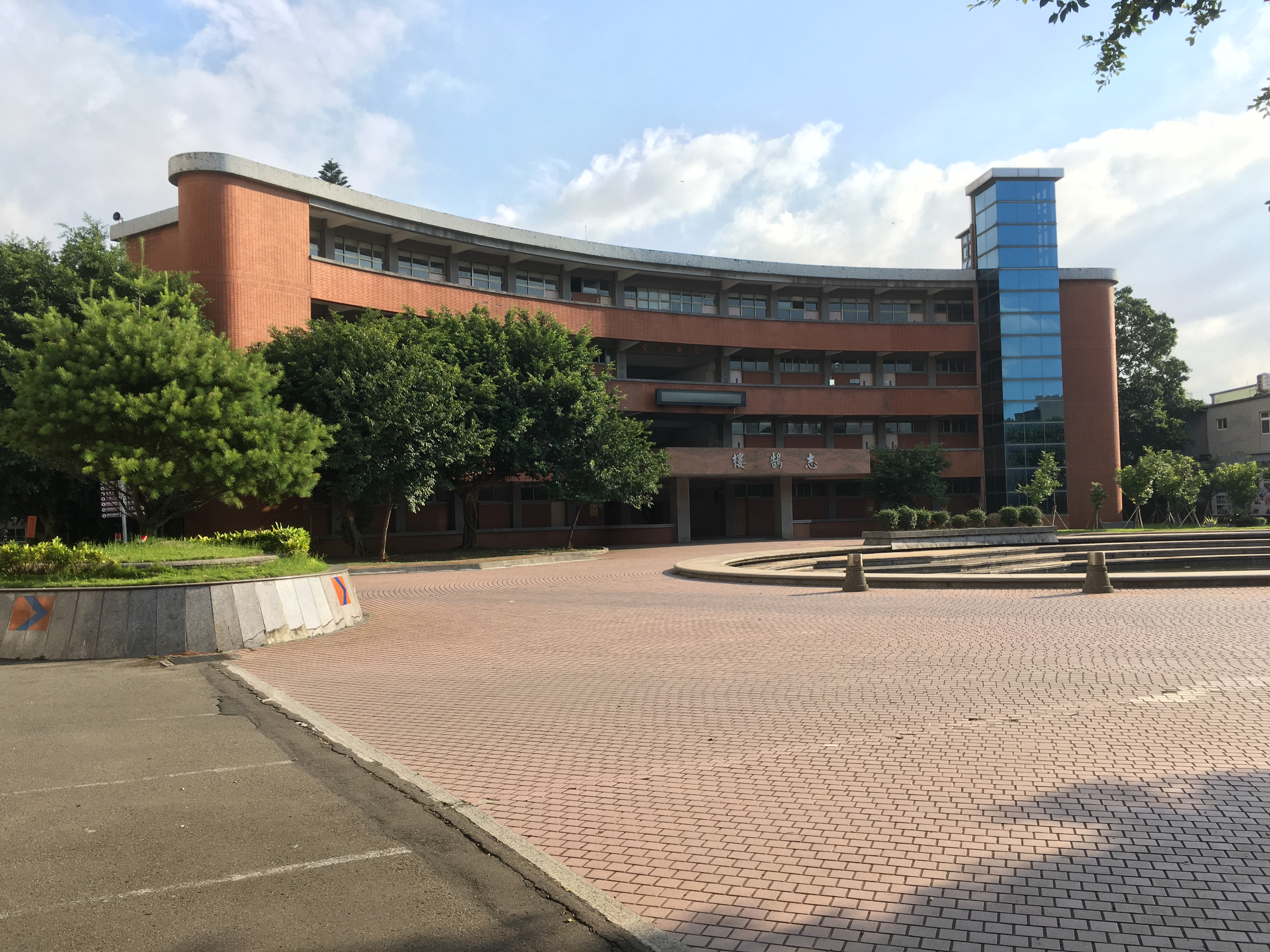
- Former names: Nanya Polytechnic
- Established: 1969
- Chairman: Tu Sheng-te
- President: Chien Rean-der
- Location: Zhongli, Taoyuan City, Taiwan; 24°56′10″N 121°15′5.8″E
- Website: Official website

Nanya Institute of Technology
- Traditional Chinese: 南亞技術學院
Transcriptions
Standard Mandarin
- Hanyu Pinyin: Nányà Jìshù Xuéyuàn
Southern Min
- Hokkien POJ: Lâm-a Ki-su̍t Ha̍k-īⁿ

Nanya Institute of Technology (Chinese: 南亞技術學院; Pe̍h-ōe-jī: Lâm-a Ki-su̍t Ha̍k-īⁿ) is a private college in Zhongli District, Taoyuan City, Taiwan.

NIT offers undergraduate programs in several fields of engineering and technology, including electrical engineering, computer science, information management, mechanical engineering, and industrial engineering. The institution also offers a graduate program in electrical engineering.

== History ==
The college was founded in 1969 as Nanya Polytechnic. It was then later renamed as Taoyuan Innovation Institute of Technology and then Nanya Institute of Technology.

== Faculties ==
- College of Business and Management
- College of Design
- College of Engineering
- College of Human Ecology

== Transportation ==
The college is accessible South East from Zhongli Station of the Taiwan Railway.

== See also ==
- List of universities in Taiwan
