= Zhongli Arts Hall =

Arts center in Zhongli, Taoyuan City, Taiwan

- 中壢藝術館
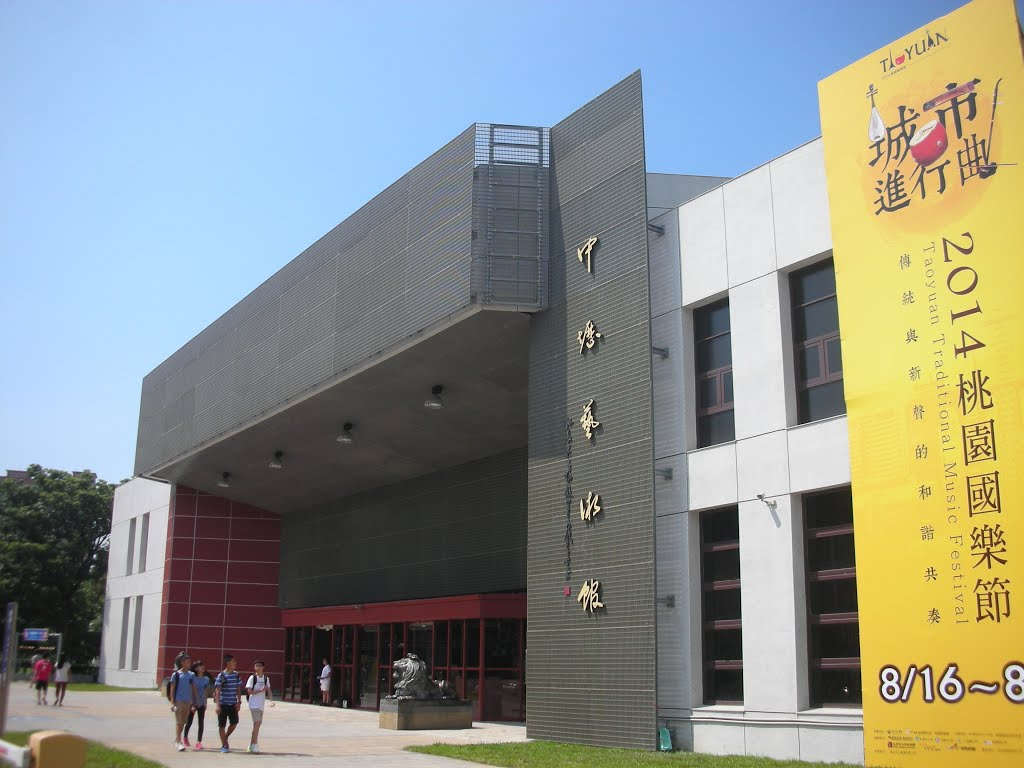
- Interactive map of the Zhongli Arts Hall area

General information
- Type: arts center
- Location: Zhongli, Taoyuan City, Taiwan
- Coordinates: 24°57′29.7″N 121°13′38.9″E
- Opened: 25 October 1985

The Zhongli Arts Hall (traditional Chinese: 中壢藝術館; simplified Chinese: 中坜艺术馆; pinyin: Zhōnglì Yìshùguǎn) is an arts center in Zhongli District, Taoyuan City, Taiwan.

== History ==
The center was opened on 25 October 1985.

== Architecture ==
- Concert hall
- Lecture hall
- Exhibition rooms

== Transportation ==
The center is accessible within walking distance north of Zhongli Station of Taiwan Railway.

== See also ==
- List of tourist attractions in Taiwan
