= HeySong Beverage Museum =

Museum in Zhongli, Taoyuan City, Taiwan

- 黑松飲料博物館
- Established: 1996
- Location: Zhongli, Taoyuan City, Taiwan
- Coordinates: 24°58′37.8″N 121°14′13.6″E
- Type: museum
- Owner: HeySong Corporation
- Website: Official website

The HeySong Beverage Museum (traditional Chinese: 黑松飲料博物館; simplified Chinese: 黑松饮料博物馆; pinyin: Hēisōng Yǐnliào Bówùguǎn) is a museum in Zhongli District, Taoyuan City, Taiwan. The museum is owned by HeySong Corporation.

== History ==
The museum was originally opened in 1996 as HeySong Museum. Over the years, the museum underwent renovations and expansions. In 2005, it was officially opened and was renamed to HeySong Beverage Museum.

== Architecture ==
The front entrance of the museum displays light boxes about HeySong Soda and Sarsaparilla cans designed for the 2004 Changhua Straits Flower Exposition. The museum exhibits all HeySong advertisement, shop signage, logos, posters, etc.

== See also ==
- List of museums in Taiwan
