= Taoyuan Public Library Longgang Branch =

- 桃園市立圖書館龍岡分館
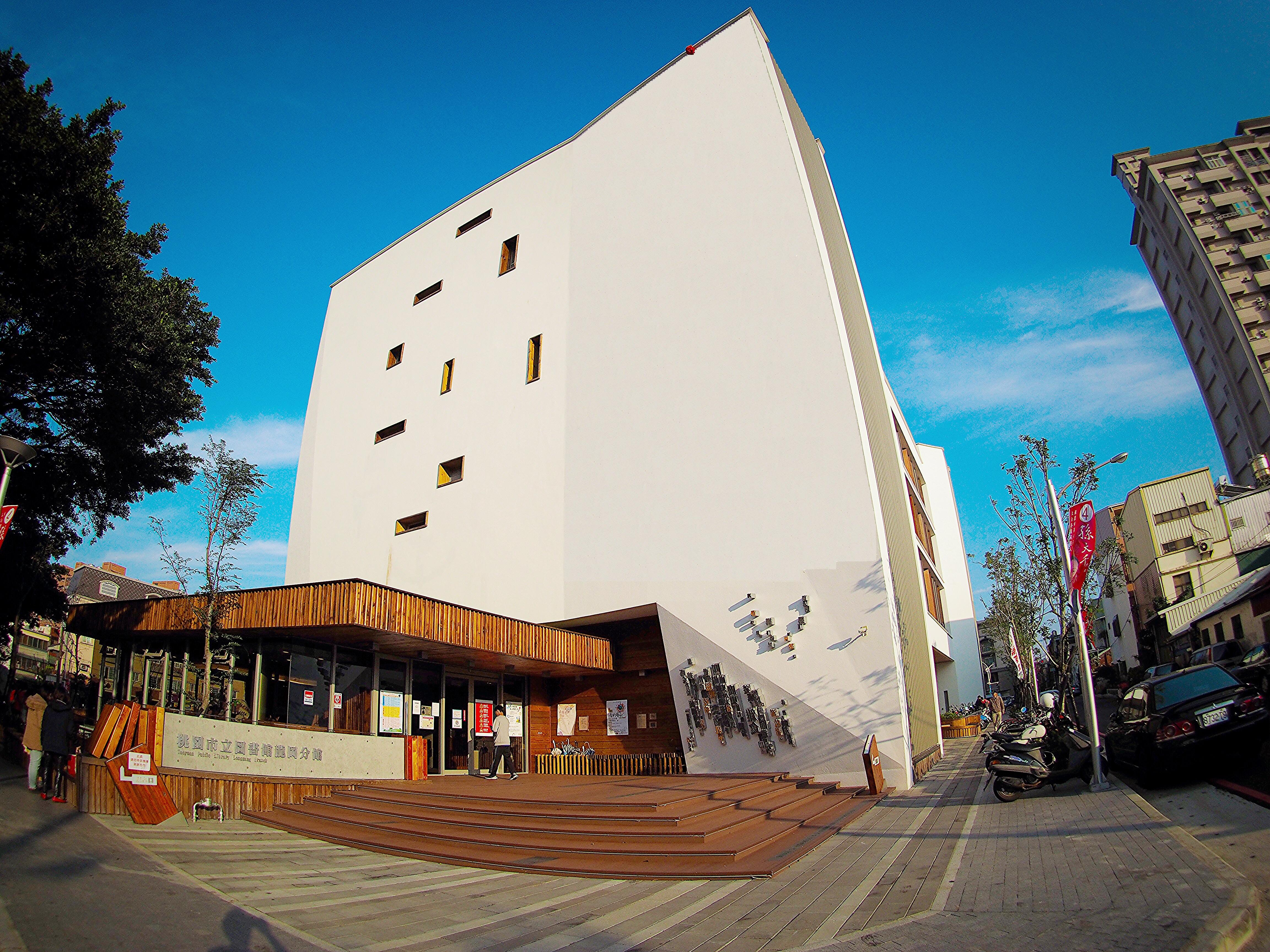
- 24.9376794°N 121.255941°E
- Location: Zhongli, Taoyuan, Taiwan
- Type: Public library
- Established: 2015

Collection
- Items collected: 100,000

Taoyuan Public Library Longgang Branch (Chinese: 桃園市立圖書館龍岡分館; pinyin: Táoyuán shìlì túshūguǎn Lónggāng fēnguǎn, Longgang is spelled variously as Lunggang sometimes) is a branch of Taoyuan Public Library, located within Zhongli, Taoyuan City, Taiwan. The library was opened in December 2015, it is the first public library in Longgang area and the third in Zhongli district.

== Architecture ==
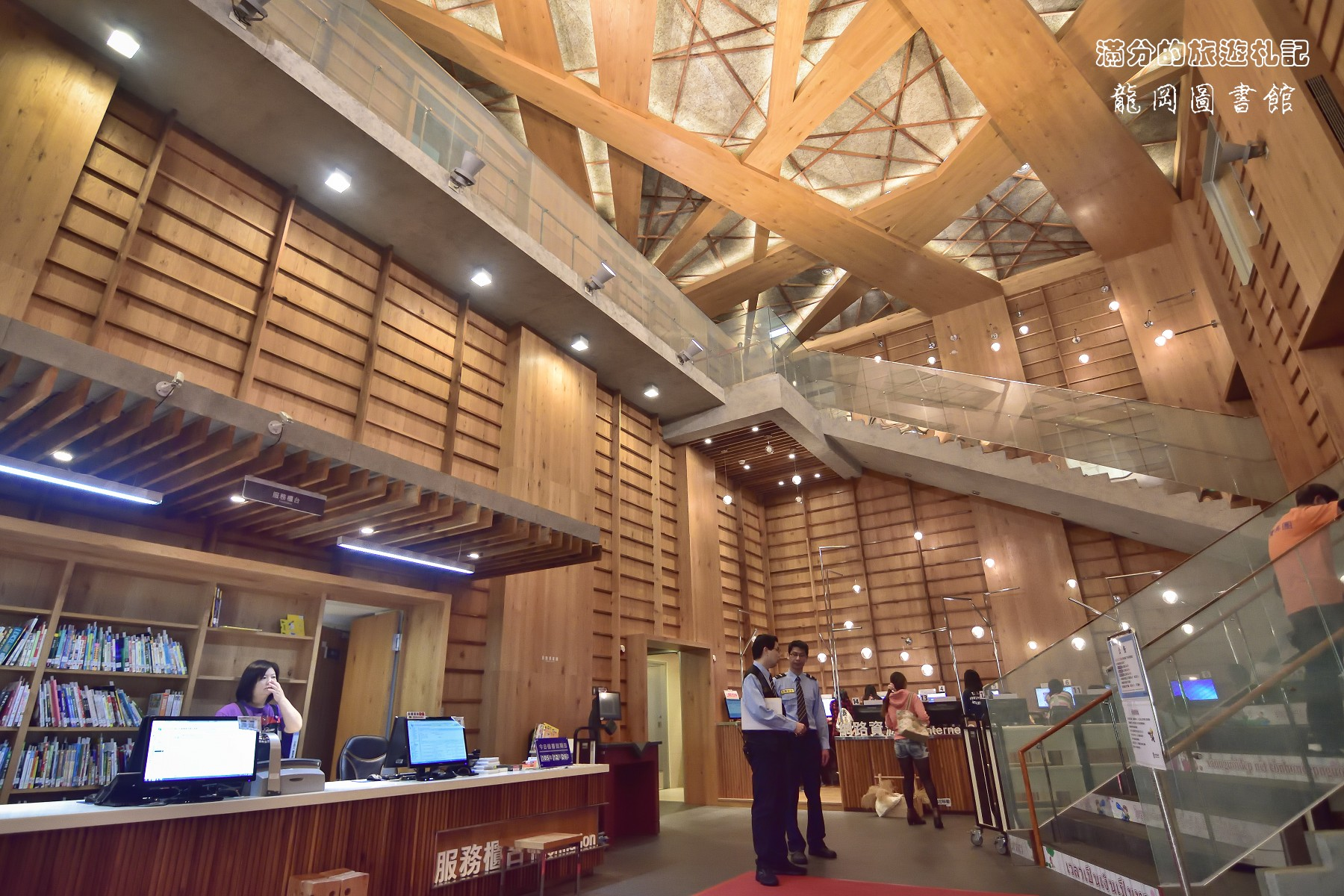
Interior of Library

Longgang branch was designed by CTLU Architect & Associates. On the outside, the library looks like a bookshelf, and it has a large number of wooden elements and wooden tables and chairs.

== Collection ==
Besides Chinese books, there's new immigrants area with multicultural elements such as books for new immigrants from Southeast Asia, including Thailand, Indonesia, Vietnam, and Myanmar.
