= Zhongli District =

District in Taoyuan City, Taiwan

Zhongli 中壢區 Chūreki, Jhongli, Chungli, Tiong-lek
- District
- Zhongli District
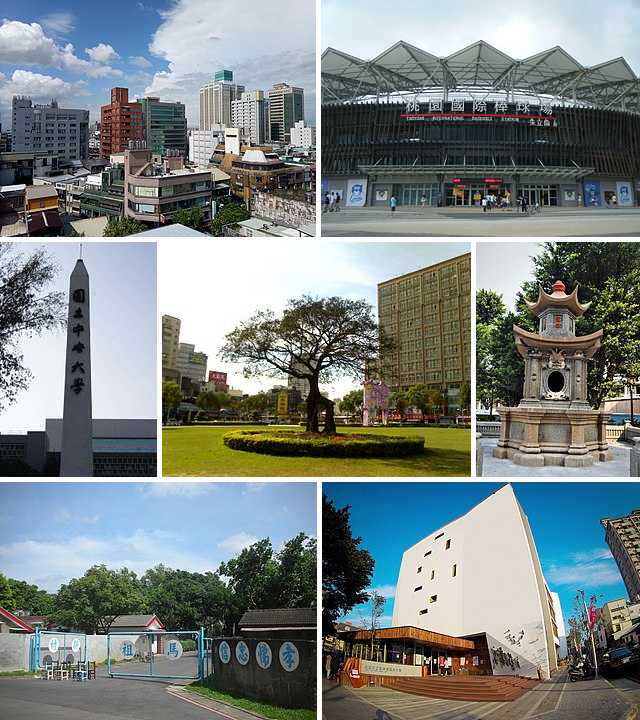
- Clockwise from top left: Zhongli skyline, Taoyuan International Baseball Stadium, Zhongli Word-worshipping Paper Incinerator, Taoyuan Public Library Longgang Branch, Matsu New Village, National Central University. Center: Zhongli Zhongzheng Park

- Coordinates: 24°57′25″N 121°13′25″E
- Country: Republic of China (Taiwan)
- Municipality: Taoyuan City

Area
  - Total: 76.52 km^{2} (29.54 sq mi)

Population (December 2024)
  - Total: 435,050
  - Density: 5,685/km^{2} (14,730/sq mi)
- Postal code: 320
- Area code: (0)34
- Website: www.zhongli.tycg.gov.tw (in Chinese)

Zhongli District (Chinese: 中壢區; pinyin: Zhōnglì Qū) is a district in Taoyuan City, Taiwan. Historically, the city is the site of the Zhongli Incident of 1977, the most significant event of the democratization movement prior to the 1980s. Ethnically, it is considered a capital city for Hakka Taiwanese, who live in great numbers here and in surrounding areas; many elderly persons can speak Hakka in addition to Mandarin and Taiwanese Hokkien. In recent years many foreign workers (mainly from the Philippines and Thailand) have also settled in and around the city due to the heavy industry in the suburbs of the city, making it a center for foreign laborers. The district of Zhongli has three large parks and over 70 green reserves.

Zhongli District is the busiest district in Southern Taoyuan (南桃園), as well as the location of the Taoyuan HSR station.

== History ==
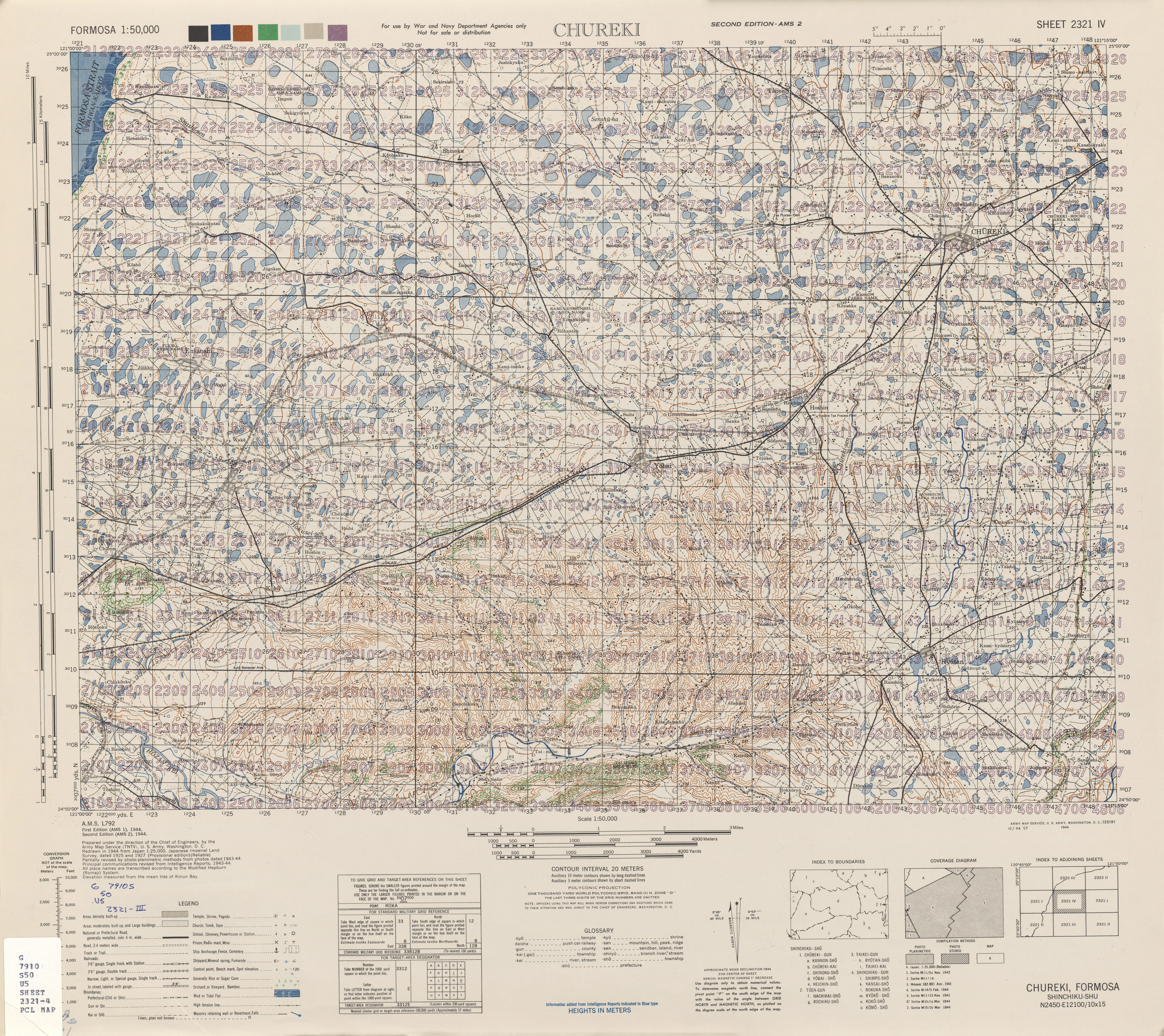
Map of Zhongli (labeled as CHŪREKI) and surrounding area (1944)

Zhongli District
- Traditional Chinese: 中壢區
Transcriptions
Standard Mandarin
- Hanyu Pinyin: Zhōnglì Qū
- Bopomofo: ㄓㄨㄥ ㄌ一ˋ ㄑㄩ
- Gwoyeu Romatzyh: Jonglih Chiu
- Wade–Giles: Chung^{1}-li^{4} Chʻü^{1}
- Tongyong Pinyin: Jhonglì Cyu
- MPS2: Jūnglì Chiū
Hakka
- Pha̍k-fa-sṳ: Chûng-lak Khî
Southern Min
- Hokkien POJ: Tiong-le̍k Khu
- Tâi-lô: Tiong-li̍k Khu

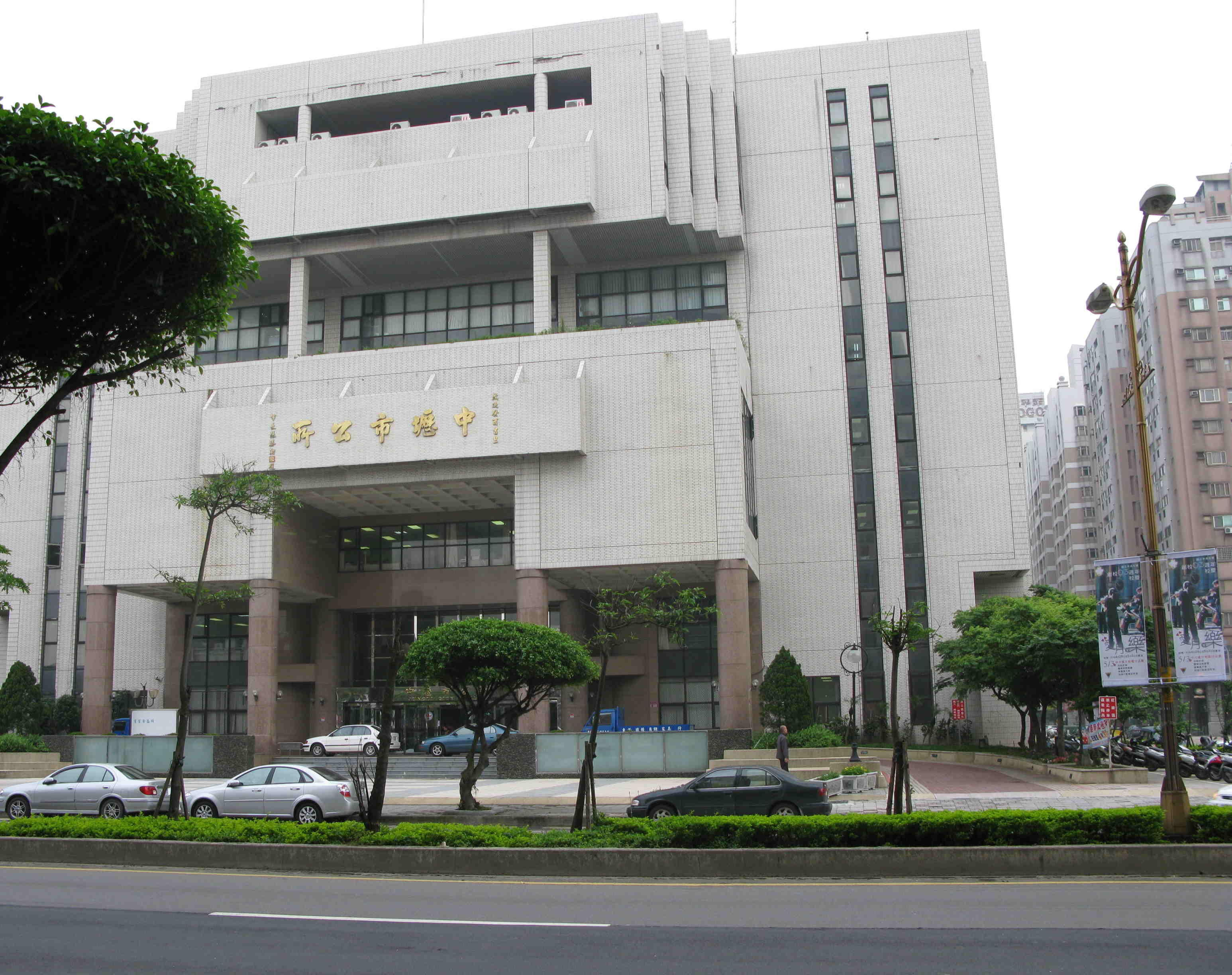
Zhongli District office (then Zhongli City office)

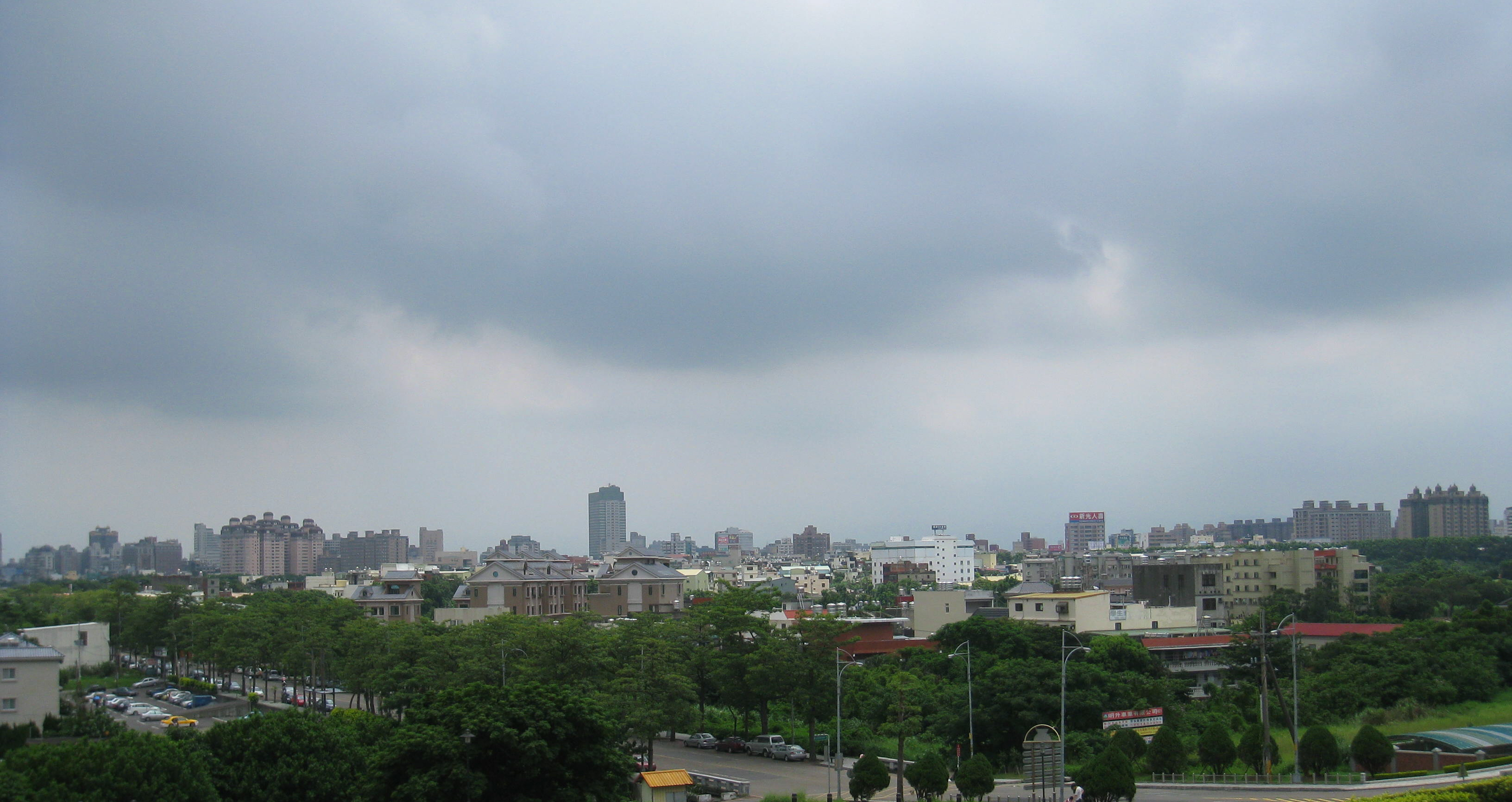
Zhongli

=== Qing dynasty ===
In the 19th century, the area was home to Plains aborigines. During the Qing dynasty, immigrants from Fujian and Guangdong provinces arrived along with Hakka. The original name of the area was Kan-a-lek (Chinese: 澗仔壢; Pe̍h-ōe-jī: Kán-á-le̍k) due to its location between Tamsui and Hsinchu.

During Japanese rule, the town was administered as Chūreki Town (中壢庄), Chūreki District, Shinchiku Prefecture.

=== Republic of China ===
After the handover of Taiwan from Japan to the Republic of China in 1945, Zhongli was reorganized as Zhongli Town. In October 1950, it was placed under Taoyuan County. On 1 July 1967, Zhongli was promoted to a county-administered city and became Zhongli City. On 25 December 2014, as Taoyuan County was upgraded to a special municipality named Taoyuan City, Zhongli became a district of the municipality.

== Demographics ==
Zhongli's population was estimated at 426,326 in March 2023, including 10,084 Taiwanese aborigines. Zhongli is subdivided into 85 villages, with the eight biggest but least populated villages on the western side of the district (39 square kilometers but with 35,000 people), while the eastern side is occupied by industrial factories and the heart of the metropolitan area. This reflects the imbalance of development of western and eastern Zhongli.

== Administrative divisions ==
The district comprises 88 villages: Chenggong (成功), Deyi (德義), Duxing (篤行), Fude (福德), Fuhua (復華), Fuxing (復興), Guangming (光明), Guoling (過嶺), Heping (和平), Houliao (後寮), Huaai (華愛), Huaxun (華勛), Jianxing (健行), Jinhua (金華), Jiuming (舊明), Linsen (林森), Longan (龍安), Longchang (龍昌), Longci (龍慈), Longde (龍德), Longgang (龍岡), Longping (龍平), Longdong (龍東), Longxing (龍興), Mingde (明德), Neicuo (內厝), Neiding (內定), Neili (內壢), Puqiang (普強), Puqing (普慶), Puren (普仁), Puyi (普義), Puzhong (普忠), Qiaxi (洽溪), Qingpu (青埔), Qingxi (青溪), Renai (仁愛), Rende (仁德), Renfu (仁福), Renhe (仁和), Renmei (仁美), Renxiang (仁祥), Renyi (仁義), Sanmin (三民), Shandong (山東), Shitou (石頭), Shuiwei (水尾), Dongxing (東興), Wenhua (文化), Wufu (五福), Wuquan (五權), Xingfu (幸福), Xingfu (興福), Xingguo (興國), Xinghe (興和), Xinghua (興華), Xingnan (興南), Xingping (興平), Xingren (興仁), Xinjie (新街), Xinming (新明), Xinxing (新興), Xinyi (信義), Yongfu (永福), Yongguang (永光), Yongxing (永興), Yuemei (月眉), Zhengyi (正義), Zhenxing (振興), Zhiba (芝芭), Zhishan (至善), Zhongfu (中福), Zhongjian (中堅), Zhongjian (中建), Zhongli (中壢), Zhongrong (中榮), Zhongshan (中山), Zhongxiao (忠孝), Zhongxing (中興), Zhongyang (中央), Zhongyi (忠義), Zhongyuan (中原), Zhongzheng (中正), Zhuangjing (莊敬), Ziqiang (自強), Zili (自立), Zixin (自信) and Zizhi (自治).

== Economy ==
=== Department Store and Shops ===
Zhongli TRA Station is surrounded by shops on the street, and Zhongli also has a SOGO-branched department store. Zhongli Night Market opens daily, usually from 6 p.m. to 1 a.m. In addition, there are two shopping districts: Ta-tung (大同商圈) and Jung-ping (中平商圈), both within half an hour's walk from the Zhongli train station.

=== Industry ===
The Zhongli–Neili Industrial Park was established in December 1976. This is a combined multipurpose industrial park, controlled by Taiwan's Economic Bureau, with a total area of 433 sq. yards. There are currently 480 companies that have built either factories or offices here, belonging to electronic, metal, chemical, mechanical, food, textile and plastic manufacturers.

== Education ==
=== Library ===
- Zhongli District Library, four floors of books, allowed to be borrowed for a month
- Neili Library
- Longgang Library

=== Universities ===
- National Central University
- Chung Yuan Christian University
- Yuan Ze University
- Chien Hsin University of Science and Technology
- Vanung University
- Nanya Institute of Technology
- Sheng-te Christian College

=== Academies and institutes ===
- Yuan Kwang Buddhist Academy
- Army Academy R.O.C.

=== Public high schools ===
- The Affiliated Jhongli Senior High School of National Central University
- National Neili Senior High School
- National Zhongli Commercial High School

== Religious organizations ==
Taoist and folk religion Temples

- Ren Hai Temple
- San Jiao Zi Yun Temple
- Ci Hui Temple

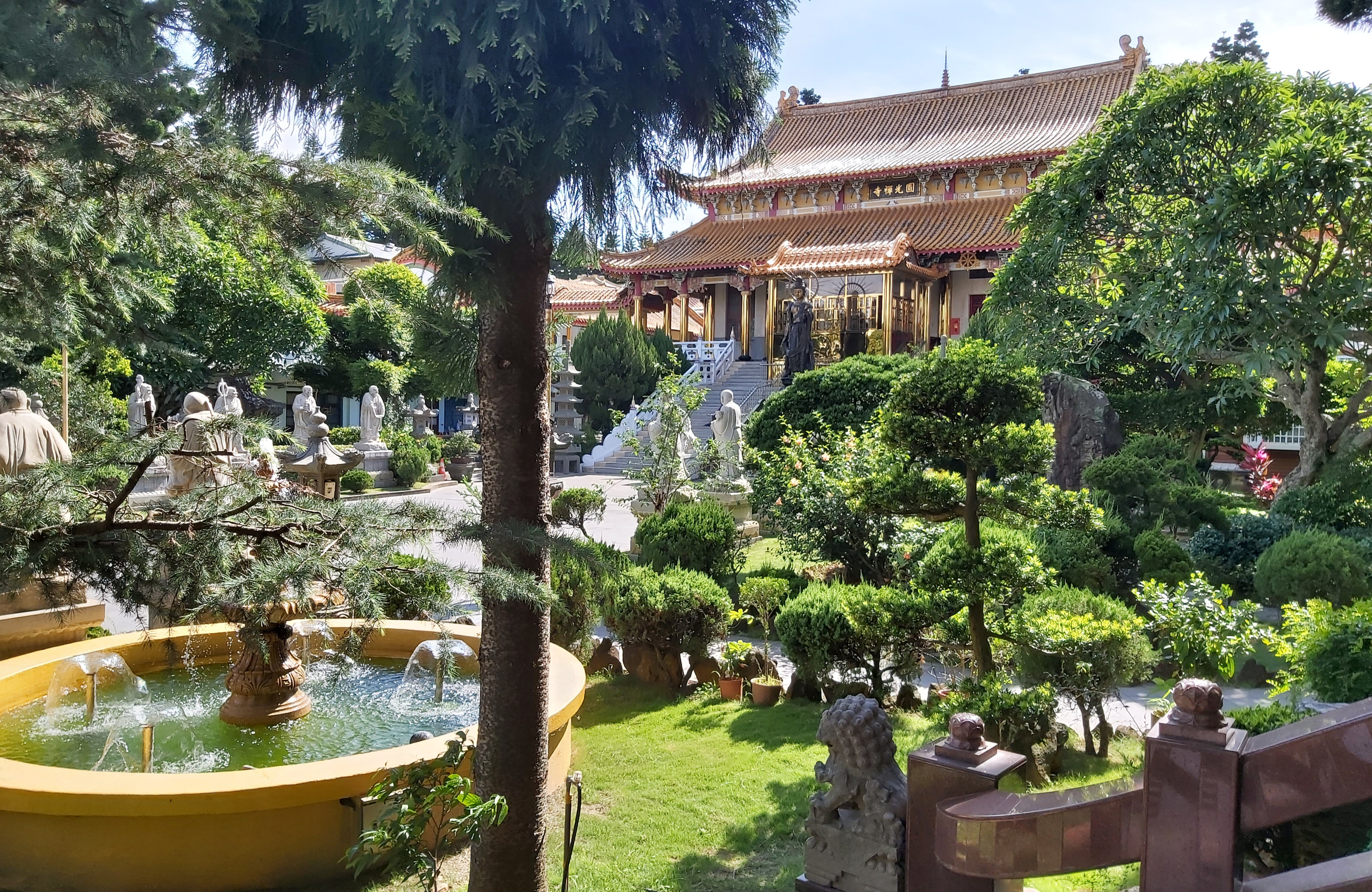
Yuan Kuang Ch'an Monastery

Buddhist Temples

- Yuan Hua Yuan
- Yong Ping Temple
- Yuan Kuang Ch'an Monastery

Christian Churches

- Taiwan Lutheran Zhongli Truth Church
- Taiwan Presbyterian Church Chungli Church
- Zhongli Church of Christ
- Zhongli Christian Bible Church
- Zhongli Catholic Sacred Heart Church

Mosque

- Longgang Mosque

== Tourist attractions ==
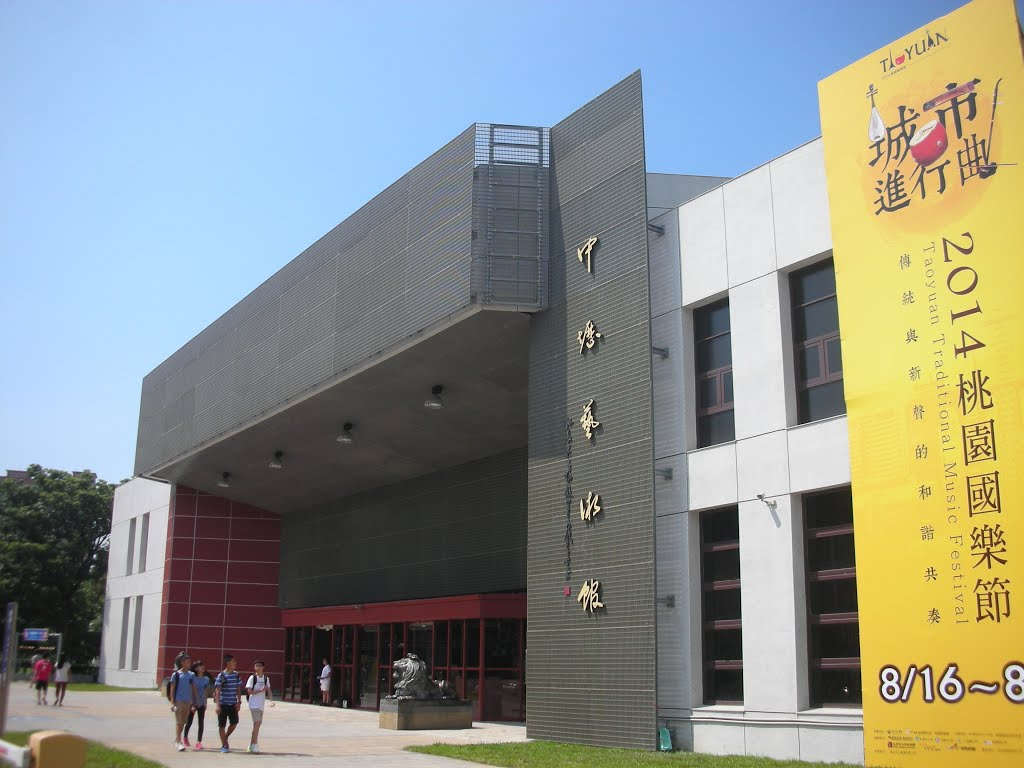
Zhongli Arts Hall

- Action Museum
- HeySong Beverage Museum
- Matsu New Village
- Laojie River
- Shengchi Pavilion
- Taiwan High Speed Rail Museum
- Taoyuan Museum of Fine Arts
- Taoyuan Public Library Longgang Branch
- Rakuten Taoyuan Baseball Stadium
- Zhongli Arts Hall
- Zhongli Night Market
- Zhongping Commercial District
- Zhongping Road Story House
- X PARK

== Transportation ==
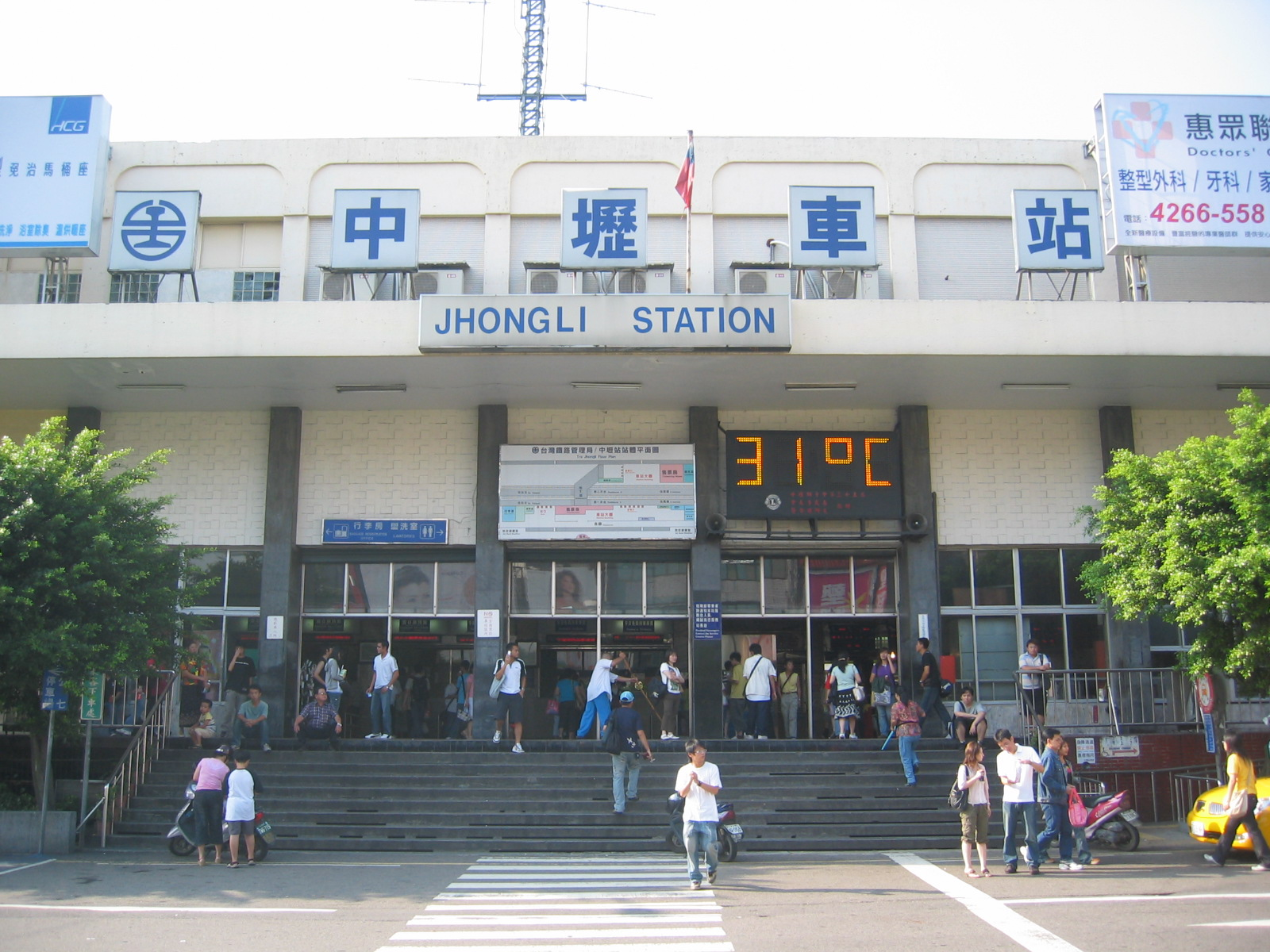
Zhongli Station

=== Railway ===
Zhongli is centered around the Zhongli railway station, the third-busiest railway station in Taiwan. There is also the Neili railway station and the under-construction Chungyuan railway station. The Taoyuan HSR station on the Taiwan High Speed Rail (THSR) is a 15-minute drive from central Zhongli. There are free shuttle buses from central Zhongli to the THSR station every 15–20 minutes. The Taoyuan Airport MRT has been open to the public since 2017. An extension of this MRT line from Huanbei Station (A21) to the TRA station is still under construction as of October 2022. Laojie River Station (A22) opened on 31 July 2023, while Zhongli Railway Station (A23) is expected to open in 2028. In addition, the Taiwan Railway Zhongli Station provides conventional train connections to other Taiwanese cities.

==== Mass rapid transit ====
- A18 Taoyuan HSR station
- A19 Taoyuan Sports Park metro station
- A20 Xingnan metro station
- A21 Huanbei metro station
- A22 Laojie River metro station
- A23 Zhongli railway station (2028)

==== Taiwan Railways ====
- Neili railway station
- Chungyuan railway station (2030)
- Zhongli railway station

==== Taiwan High Speed Rail ====
- Taoyuan HSR station

=== Roads ===
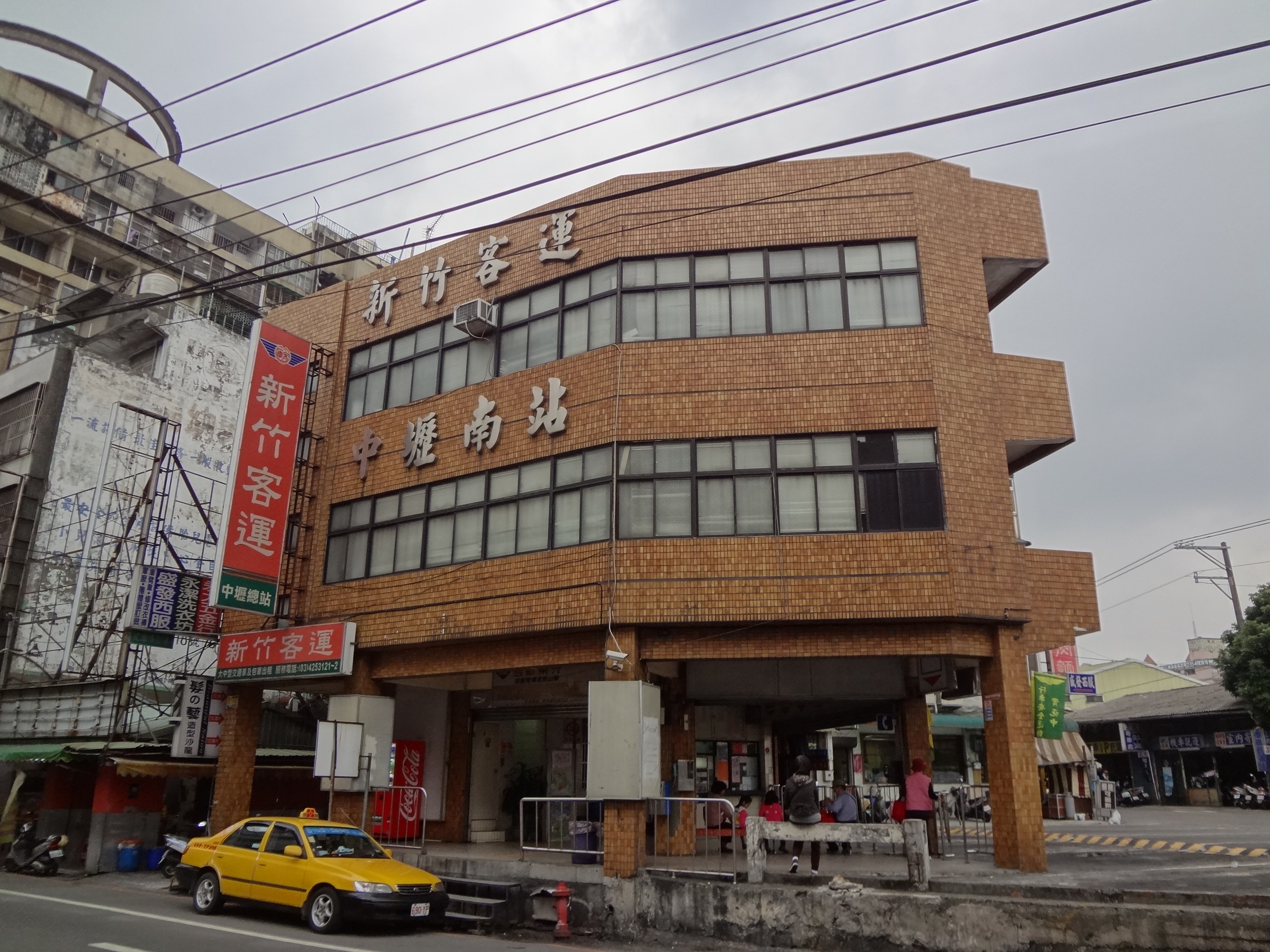
Zhongli South Bus Station

Zhongli is served by both National Highway No. 1 and Provincial Highway No. 66. The nationally owned E-Go freeway buses, near the Zhongli Station, are an inexpensive way of transport to other cities.

== Sister Cities ==
- (South Korea) Gumi, Republic of Korea (since 1989)
- Enfield, Connecticut, United States

== Notable natives ==
- Angela Chang, singer and actress
- Candy Chen, dancer, actress, host, singer and model
- Maggie Chiang, singer and songwriter
- Hu Chen-pu, Commandant of the ROC Army (2006–2007)
- Elva Hsiao, singer and actress
- Hsu Hsin-liang, Chairperson of Democratic Progressive Party (1996–1998)
- Jawshing Arthur Liou (born 1968), digital artist
- Huang Pei-jia, actress
- Wu Po-hsiung, Chairman of Kuomintang (2007–2009)
- Shih Szu, actress
- John Wu, Magistrate of Taoyuan County (2009–2014)
- Aska Yang, singer

== See also ==
- Taoyuan City
