= The Affiliated Jhongli Senior High School of National Central University =

The Affiliated Zhongli Senior High School of National Central University
- 國立中央大學附屬中壢高級中學
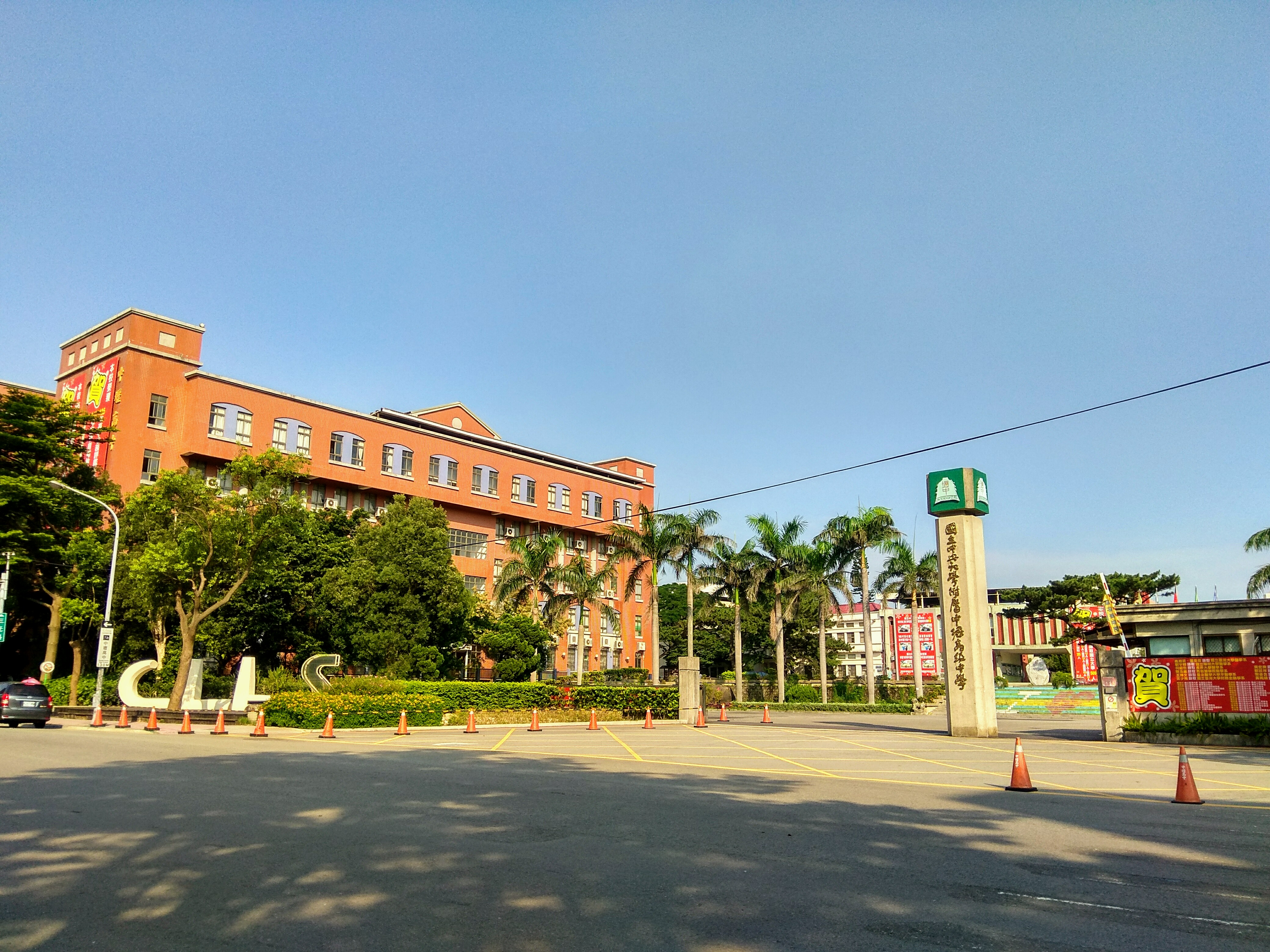

Location
- No.115, Sanguang Rd. Zhongli District; Taoyuan City, 320; Taiwan
- Coordinates: 24°57′47.18″N 121°12′37.82″E

Information
- Type: Public school
- Established: 1940
- School district: Zhongli District
- Head of school: Shih-Feng Lee
- Grades: 10-12
- Age range: 16 - 18
- Enrollment: 2122
- Language: Standard Mandarin (Traditional)
- Website: http://www.clhs.tyc.edu.tw/

The Affiliated Zhongli Senior High School of National Central University (Chinese: 國立中央大學附屬中壢高級中學) is a public high school, which is located in Zhongli District, Taoyuan City, Taiwan. National Zhongli Senior High School was previously a Japanese Temple built in October 1939. After KMT migrated to Taiwan, the temple was abolished and became a local senior high school.

== See also ==
- Education in Taiwan
