= Xingnan metro station =

Metro station in Taoyuan, Taiwan

Xingnan A20 興南
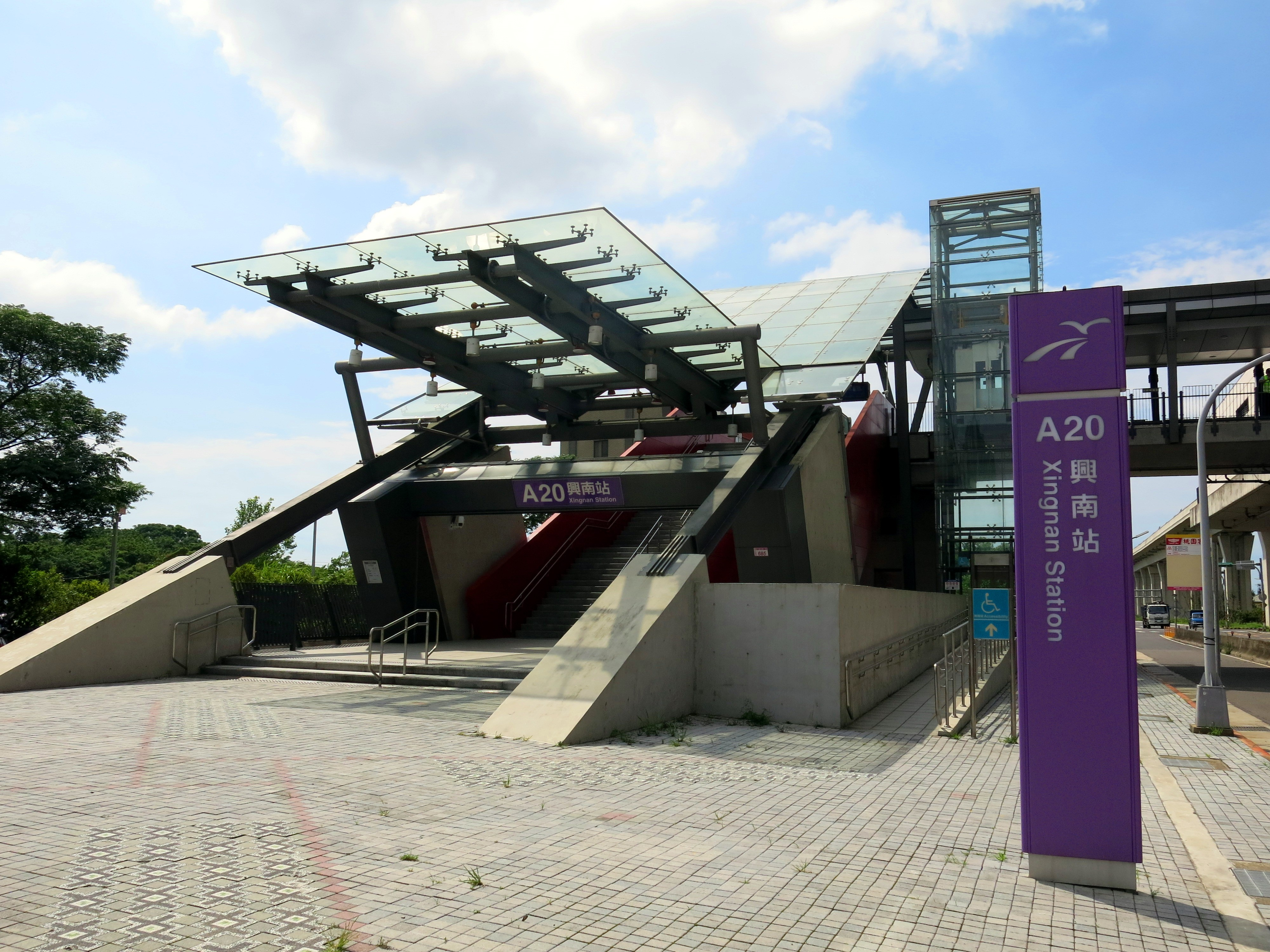
- Station entrance

General information
- Location: 685 Sec 1 Zhongfeng N Rd; Zhongli, Taoyuan City; Taiwan
- Coordinates: 24°58′48.81″N 121°12′58.18″E
- Operated by: Taoyuan Metro Corporation
- Line: Taoyuan Airport MRT (A20)

Construction
- Structure type: Elevated

Other information
- Station code: A20

History
- Opened: 2017-03-02

Passengers
- Aug 2025: 529 (entries and exits, daily)
- Rank: 22/22

Services
Preceding station	Taoyuan Metro	Following station
Taoyuan Sports Park towards Taipei Main Station	Taoyuan Airport MRT Commuter	Huanbei towards Laojie River
Taoyuan Airport MRT does not stop here
Location

Xingnan (Chinese: 興南) is a station on the Taoyuan Airport MRT located in Zhongli, Taoyuan City, Taiwan. It opened for commercial service on 2 March 2017.

== Overview ==
This elevated station has two side platforms with two tracks. Only commuter trains stop at this station. The station is 148.2 metres (486 ft) long and 27 metres (89 ft) wide. It opened for trial service on 2 February 2017, and for commercial service on 2 March 2017.

Construction on the station began on 18 September 2008, and opened for commercial service on 2 March 2017 with the opening of the Taipei-Huanbei section of the Airport MRT.

== Around the station ==
- Goat World Ranch (羊世界牧場) (1.2km northwest of the station)

== Exits ==
- Exit 1: Section 1, Zhongfeng North Road

== See also ==
- Taoyuan Metro
