= Neili railway station =

Railway station in Taoyuan, Taiwan

Neili 內壢
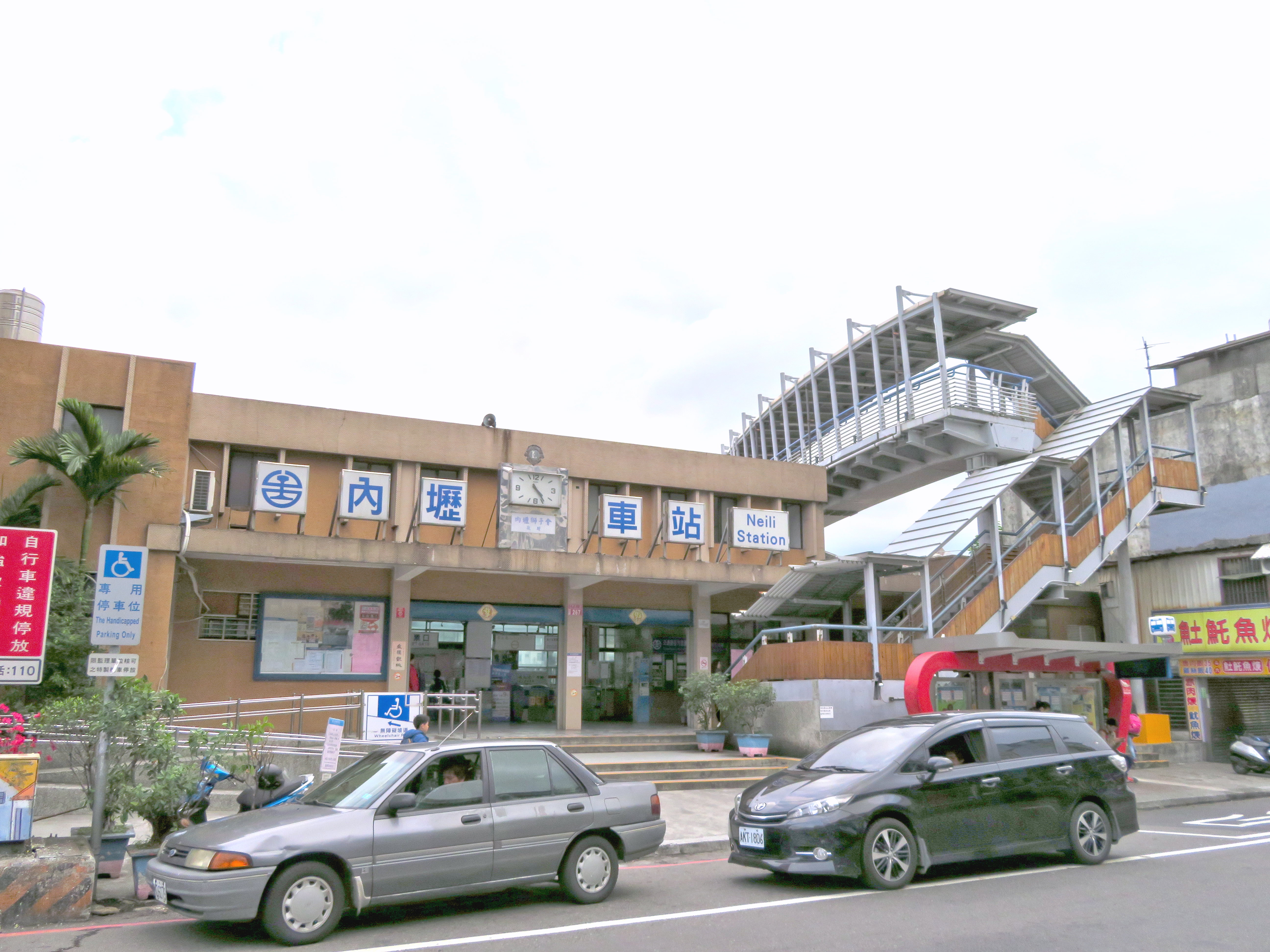

Chinese name
- Traditional Chinese: 內壢
Transcriptions
Standard Mandarin
- Hanyu Pinyin: Nèilì
- Bopomofo: ㄊㄠˊ ㄩㄢˊ

General information
- Location: 1 Zhonghua Rd; Zhongli District, Taoyuan; Taiwan
- Coordinates: 24.9728°N 121.2582°E
- System: Taiwan Railway railway station
- Line: Western Trunk line
- Distance: 63.3 km to Keelung
- Connections: Local bus; Coach

Construction
- Structure type: Ground level

Other information
- Station code: A19 (statistical)
- Classification: Third class (Chinese: 三等)

History
- Opened: 1 June 1902
- Electrified: 9 January 1978

Passengers
- 2017: 6.266 million per year ▲2.51%
- Rank: 19 out of 228

Services
Preceding station	Taiwan Railway	Following station
Taoyuan towards Keelung	Western Trunk line	Zhongli towards Kaohsiung
Location
- Location within Taiwan

Neili (Chinese: 內壢; pinyin: Nèilì) is a railway station in Zhongli District, Taoyuan City, Taiwan served by Taiwan Railway.

== Overview ==
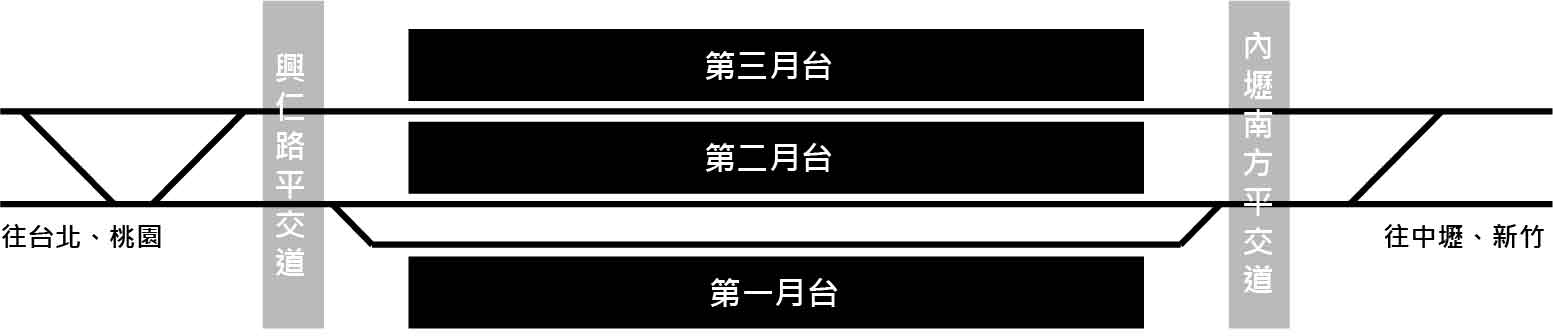
Neili station platform layout

The station has two island platforms and one side platform. As part of the Taoyuan Underground Railway Project, an additional island platform was opened in 2017. The station has an underground passageway to connect the station front with the second platform and the newly constructed platform. The station also has an elevated walkway.

The station will be underground as a part of the Taoyuan Metropolitan Area Railway Underground Project, which will be completed in September 2030.

== History ==
- 1 June 1902: The station opened for service as 崁仔脚驛.
- 1920: The station name was changed to 崁子脚驛.
- 10 February 1958: The name was changed to its current name.
- 1 August 2008: The station began accepting EasyCard for payment.
- September 2020: Construction began on the underground station, which is scheduled to open in December 2030.

== Around the station ==
- Vanung University
- Yuan Ze University
- National Nei-Li Senior High School
- Nei-Li Junior High School
- Tzu-Chiang Junior High School
- Nei-Li Elementary School
- Tzu-Li Elementary School
- Xingren Elementary School
- Yuansheng Elementary School
- Taoyuan City Police Department, Zhongli Branch, Neili Office
- Advanced Semiconductor Engineering, Inc., Neili Factory

== See also ==
- List of railway stations in Taiwan
