= Zhongli railway station =

Railway station in Taoyuan, Taiwan

Zhongli 中壢
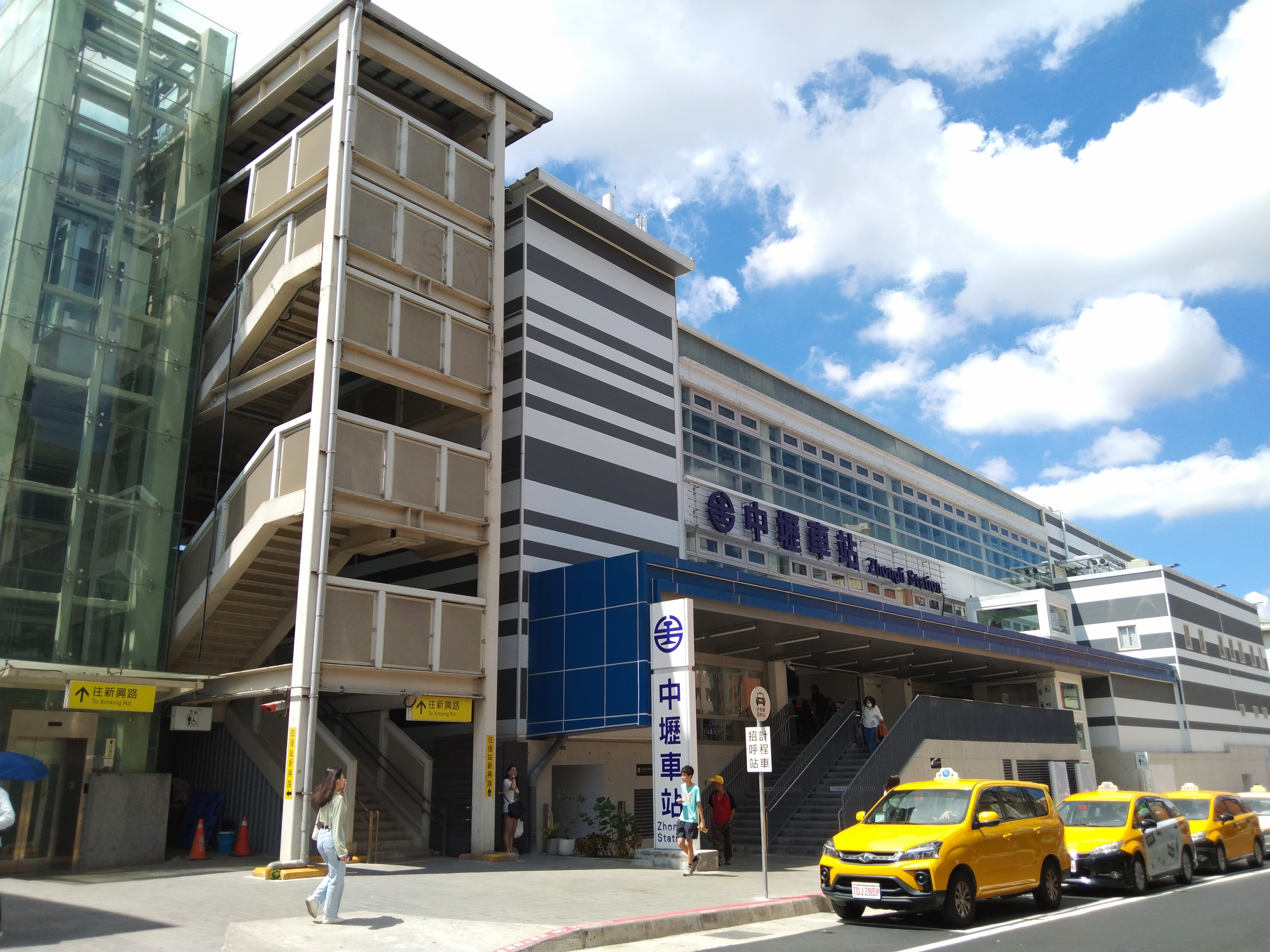

Chinese name
- Traditional Chinese: 中壢
Transcriptions
Standard Mandarin
- Hanyu Pinyin: Zhōnglì
- Bopomofo: ㄓㄨㄥ ㄌㄧˋ

General information
- Location: 139 Zhonghe Rd; Zhongli District, Taoyuan; Taiwan
- Coordinates: 24.9537°N 121.2258°E
- System: TRA railway station
- Line: Western Trunk line
- Distance: 57.4 km to Keelung
- Connections: Local bus; Coach

Construction
- Structure type: Ground level

Other information
- Station code: 108 (three-digit); 1017 (four-digit); A20 (statistical)
- Classification: First class (Chinese: 一等)
- Website: www.railway.gov.tw/Jhongli/index.aspx (in Chinese)

History
- Opened: 30 October 1893
- Electrified: 9 January 1978

Passengers
- 2017: 20.241 million per year ▼0.87%
- Rank: 3 out of 228

Services
| Preceding station | Taiwan Railway | Following station |
|---|---|---|
| Neili towards Keelung | Western Trunk line | Puxin towards Kaohsiung |
Location
- Location within Taiwan

Zhongli (Chinese: 中壢; pinyin: Zhōnglì) is a railway station in Taoyuan, Taiwan served by Taiwan Railway. It is the third-busiest station in Taiwan's rail network. It is also a planned terminus for Taoyuan Airport MRT of the Taoyuan Metro, scheduled for completion in 2028. This station is currently at ground level, and construction is ongoing to replace it underground as a part of Taoyuan Metropolitan Area Railway Underground Project, which is scheduled to be completed in September 2030.

A proposed cross-platform interchange project for Green line and Airport MRT is set to be constructed under Zhongli Station. The station layout will be composed of two island platforms, between which a connecting zone set to integrated the two into a single "large platform". Buffer stops will also be placed back-to back between Airport-bound trains and Green line trains. The scheme is scheduled to be complete in 2031.

== Around the station ==
- Army Academy R.O.C.
- Chien Hsin University of Science and Technology
- Chung Yuan Christian University
- Ching Yun Commercial Center
- Laojie River (about 800 meters west of the station)
- Zhongli Arts Hall
- Zhongli Tourist Night Market (about 1500 meters west of the station)
- Zhongping Commercial District (next to the station)
- Zhongping Road Story House (about 300 meters north-west of the station)
- Zhongzheng Park (about 600 meters north of the station)

== See also ==
- List of railway stations in Taiwan
