= Nantou County Constituency 1 =

Constituency of the Legislative Yuan of Taiwan

- Single-member constituency for the Legislative Yuan
- District(s): Puli, Caotun, Zhongliao, Yuchi, Guoxing, Ren'ai
- Electorate: 186,220 (2024 election)

Current constituency
- Created: 2008
- Party: KMT
- Member: Ma Wen-chun

Nantou County Constituency 1 (Chinese: 南投縣第一選舉區) is one of the 73 regional constituencies represented in the Legislative Yuan, the national legislature of Taiwan. It was created in 2008 following a series of constitutional reforms, and elects one legislator, through first-past-the-post voting, to the Legislative Yuan. It has been represented by Ma Wen-chun of the Kuomintang since 2009.

== Legislators ==
| Election | Legislator | Party |
|---|---|---|
| 2008 - 2009 | Wu Den-yih | Kuomintang |
| 2009 | Ma Wen-chun | Kuomintang |

== Election results ==

=== 2008 ===
2008 Taiwanese legislative election: Nantou County 1
| Candidate | Party | Votes | % |
|---|---|---|---|
| Wu Den-yih | Kuomintang | 64,295 | 67.12 |
| Lin Yun-sheng | Democratic Progressive Party | 31,489 | 32.88 |
| Total | | 95,784 | 100.00 |
| Valid votes | | 95,784 | 97.97 |
| Invalid/blank votes | | 1,986 | 2.03 |
| Total votes | | 97,770 | 100.00 |
| Registered voters/turnout | | 183,448 | 53.30 |
| Majority | | 32,806 | 34.24 |
| Kuomintang win (new seat) | | | |

=== 2009 by-election ===
Called following Wu Den-yih's ascension to Premier.

2009 Legislative Yuan by-election: Nantou County 1
| Candidate | Party | Votes | % | +/– |
|---|---|---|---|---|
| Ma Wen-chun | Kuomintang | 65,922 | 55.26 | ▼11.86 |
| Lin Yun-sheng | Democratic Progressive Party | 53,362 | 44.74 | ▲11.86 |
| Total | | 119,284 | 100.00 | – |
| Valid votes | | 119,284 | 96.79 | |
| Invalid/blank votes | | 3,956 | 3.21 | |
| Total votes | | 123,240 | 100.00 | |
| Registered voters/turnout | | 185,818 | 66.32 | |
| Majority | | 12,560 | 10.52 | |
| Kuomintang hold | | | | |

=== 2012 ===
* denotes the incumbent legislator

2012 Taiwanese legislative election: Nantou County 1
| Candidate | Party | Votes | % | +/– |
|---|---|---|---|---|
| Ma Wen-chun* | Kuomintang | 78,083 | 60.27 | ▲5.01 |
| Chang Kuo-hsin | Democratic Progressive Party | 49,950 | 38.55 | ▼6.19 |
| Ho Kuo-lung | Taiwanism Party | 1,526 | 1.18 | NEW |
| Total | | 129,559 | 100.00 | – |
| Valid votes | | 129,559 | 98.17 | |
| Invalid/blank votes | | 2,415 | 1.83 | |
| Total votes | | 131,974 | 100.00 | |
| Registered voters/turnout | | 186,574 | 70.74 | |
| Majority | | 28,133 | 21.72 | |
| Kuomintang hold | | | | |

=== 2016 ===
* denotes the incumbent legislator

2016 Taiwanese legislative election: Nantou County 1
| Candidate | Party | Votes | % | +/– |
|---|---|---|---|---|
| Ma Wen-chun* | Kuomintang | 63,600 | 54.77 | ▼5.50 |
| Chang Kuo-hsin | Democratic Progressive Party | 52,521 | 45.23 | ▲6.68 |
| Total | | 116,121 | 100.00 | – |
| Valid votes | | 116,121 | 97.58 | |
| Invalid/blank votes | | 2,885 | 2.42 | |
| Total votes | | 119,006 | 100.00 | |
| Registered voters/turnout | | 188,743 | 63.05 | |
| Majority | | 11,079 | 9.54 | |
| Kuomintang hold | | | | |

=== 2020 ===
* denotes the incumbent legislator

2020 Taiwanese legislative election: Nantou County 1
| Candidate | Party | Votes | % | +/– |
|---|---|---|---|---|
| Ma Wen-chun* | Kuomintang | 73,480 | 53.57 | ▼1.20 |
| Tsai Pei-hui | Democratic Progressive Party | 63,691 | 46.43 | ▲1.20 |
| Total | | 137,171 | 100.00 | – |
| Valid votes | | 137,171 | 98.66 | |
| Invalid/blank votes | | 1,870 | 1.34 | |
| Total votes | | 139,041 | 100.00 | |
| Registered voters/turnout | | 188,443 | 73.78 | |
| Majority | | 9,789 | 7.14 | |
| Kuomintang hold | | | | |

=== 2024 ===
* denotes the incumbent legislator

2024 Taiwanese legislative election: Nantou County 1
| Candidate | Party | Votes | % | +/– |
|---|---|---|---|---|
| Ma Wen-chun* | Kuomintang | 68,890 | 53.09 | ▼0.48 |
| Tsai Ming-hsuan | Democratic Progressive Party | 50,886 | 39.22 | ▼7.21 |
| Hsu Wen-chung | Labor Party | 3,577 | 2.76 | NEW |
| Lin Chin-tan | Independent | 3,373 | 2.60 | NEW |
| Li Yuan-en | Taiwan Obasang Political Equality Party | 3,035 | 2.34 | NEW |
| Total | | 129,761 | 100.00 | – |
| Valid votes | | 129,761 | 98.10 | |
| Invalid/blank votes | | 2,518 | 1.90 | |
| Total votes | | 132,279 | 100.00 | |
| Registered voters/turnout | | 186,220 | 71.03 | |
| Majority | | 18,004 | 13.87 | |
| Democratic Progressive Party hold | | | | |
