= 18th Party Congress =

18th Party Congress may refer to:

- 18th Party Congress (Soviet Union), i.e., 18th Congress of the All-Union Communist Party (Bolsheviks) (1939)
- 18th Party Congress (Kuomintang), i.e., 18th National Congress of the Kuomintang (2009)
- 18th Party Congress (China), i.e., 18th National Congress of the Chinese Communist Party (2012)

== See also ==
- 18th Congress (disambiguation)
