= Tatung Chang Chi Foods Co., Ltd. =

Cooking oil company in Taiwan

Chang Chi Foodstuff Factory Co., Ltd.
- Type: Co., Ltd.
- Founded: January 1977
- Founder: Gao Zhenli
- Headquarters: Taiwan
- Services: food、Beverage、Cooking oilGrain Product Manufacturing Industry

Tatung Chang Chi Foods Co., Ltd. is a large cooking oil company in Taiwan, with a market share that once approached 40%. It was founded in January 1977 (the 66th year of the Republic of China). In the early years, its main products included salad oil, peanut oil, sesame oil, and bitter tea oil, with later additions of sunflower oil, canola oil, corn oil, grape seed oil, olive oil, and blended cottonseed oil in its import business. The company's products are sold through various channels, including the Ministry of National Defense Welfare Department, PX Mart Welfare Centers, and a wide range of mass retail stores and supermarkets across Taiwan. It has established business locations in major counties and cities across the island.

== Development History ==
1977: The company initially focused on salad oil, peanut oil, sesame oil, and bitter tea oil as its main products.

1991: The company began importing sunflower oil, canola oil, corn oil, grape seed oil, and olive oil, expanding its product offerings. Its products were sold through various channels, including the Ministry of National Defense Welfare Department, PX Mart Welfare Centers, and numerous mass retail stores and supermarkets across Taiwan. Business locations were also established in major counties and cities throughout the island.

1999: The company established the Zhangbin factory in the Changhua Coastal Industrial Park.

2002: The Zhangbin factory was completed and put into operation.

2013: The company was found to have mislabeled some of its products.

2014, July 10: The Changhua County Health Bureau imposed a fine based on Article 26 of the Administrative Penalty Act. However, since the Changhua District Court had already issued a criminal judgment on the same issue, the Administrative Appeal Committee annulled the fine of NT$1.85 billion.

== Political and Business Connections ==
2011: The grand opening of Tatung Chang Chi's "Soy Sauce Tourist Factory" attracted a high-profile guest list. Among the attendees were the Minister of Transportation and Communications, Mao Chi-kuo, who was in charge of tourism affairs, as well as President Ma Ying-jeou's elder sister Ma Yi-nan and the wife of then Premier Wu Den-yih, Tsai Ling-yi, among others.

April 2012: Gao Zhenli, the company’s leader, dined with Vice President Wu Den-yih, raising public curiosity about whether this meeting delayed the investigation process. Notable guests at the dinner included Chinese Nationalist Party (KMT) lawmakers Lin Cang-min, Wang Hui-mei, and Zheng Ru-fen, who were speculated to be acting as gatekeepers for the company.

According to Next Magazine, a former employee who had helped set up the Tatung Chang Chi Soy Sauce Tourist Factory in 2011 stated, "Gao Zhenli's influence in Changhua comes largely from KMT County Councilor Ye Ning-feng. When applying for the factory's tourism license, county officials came for an inspection. Gao Zhenli refused to show them the packaging factory where the 'adulterated oil equipment' was stored and even shouted at them. When Ye Ning-feng arrived, the county officials left without saying a word, and shortly afterward, the license was approved." Ye Ning-feng died in August 2013, and following his death, unfavorable news about Tatung emerged, with local civil servants seizing the opportunity to "settle scores" and eventually uncovering Gao Zhenli’s wrongdoings.

2013: In the wake of Tatung's food safety scandal, Democratic Progressive Party (DPP) Changhua County Councilor Lai Qing-mei apologized in front of the media while Gao Zhenli was giving an explanation to reporters. However, Ye Yan-bo, the Director of the Changhua County Health Bureau, stated that Lai had not discussed the Tatung case with him.

2014: Next Magazine reported that KMT legislator Lin Cang-min was one of the "gatekeepers" for Tatung. Lin Cang-min, a member of the Legislative Yuan's Economic Committee, admitted to having regular meetings with industrial zone business associations to hear public opinions and policy explanations. However, he denied knowing Gao Zhenli personally, claiming there was no political donation or business interest involved. Lin also criticized Next Magazine for its biased and unjust reporting.

== Oil Contamination Scandal ==
=== Incident ===
In the 1970s, Gao Zhenli, who was involved in a small oil business, had been mixing low-cost cottonseed oil with premium oils for profit.

On October 16, 2013, Tatung Chang Chi Foods' Tatung Extra Virgin Olive Oil was found to contain less than 50% olive oil, with the addition of copper chlorophyllin for coloring. The product, which was marketed as 100% imported Spanish extra virgin cold-pressed olive oil, was claimed to be "100% extra virgin olive oil" and "extra virgin olive oil," but in reality, it was mixed with low-cost sunflower oil (extracted from sunflower seeds) and cottonseed oil (extracted from cotton seeds). The authorities also seized an unknown paste-like substance, which Tatung Chang Chi claimed was chlorophyll, but they could not provide evidence to support this claim. The Changhua District Prosecutor's Office and the Changhua County Health Bureau's Food Safety Division suspected that Tatung Chang Chi had violated the Food Safety Management Act and Criminal Code of the Republic of China for fraud and adulteration (which could lead to up to three years in prison). They ordered Tatung Chang Chi to recall the affected products, including the extra virgin olive oil, and suspended the production line at the factory responsible for manufacturing these products.

On October 16, 2013, Gao Zhenli was released on bail of NT$1 million due to the complaint regarding the impure olive oil. On October 17, Gao Zhenli publicly apologized to consumers, admitting that internal controls at Tatung Chang Chi were lax but emphasized that the addition of copper chlorophyllin was not harmful to human health. Tatung Chang Chi was accused of deceiving consumers by selling a so-called extra virgin olive oil that was a mix of some olive oil and cheap cottonseed oil, with copper chlorophyllin added for color. This product had been sold for seven years, and consuming it in large quantities could lead to liver and kidney issues. Xu Wan-zhen, a technician from the Changhua County Health Bureau, stated, "Chlorophyll is only allowed in bubble gum and some foods, but it is not permitted in oils."

On October 25, 2013, a former employee of Tatung Chang Chi exposed that the company’s satay sauce was made using low-quality ingredients, such as wet soybeans from Vietnam and Thailand replacing peanuts, discarded mushroom cultivation bags being used for mushroom stems instead of fresh mushrooms, and fish that had been frozen for up to 20 years.

On October 25, 2013, the Changhua District Prosecutor’s Office filed charges against Gao Zhenli for violating the Food Safety Management Act and committing fraud under the Criminal Code of the Republic of China. The Changhua County Government issued a penalty of NT$1.85 billion.

On October 28, 2013, the Changhua County Government's Finance Department began investigating related companies of Tatung Chang Chi, including Da Lian Brewing, whose products were found to have been made using industrial-grade alcohol, with false labeling. A fine of NT$5.5 million was imposed, and the products were ordered to be recalled and removed from shelves.

On November 1, 2013, Tatung Chang Chi proposed a compensation plan involving NT$12.3 million in cash and 12 pieces of land worth more than NT$1 billion. The Changhua County Government initiated further regulatory actions and asset freezing procedures.

On November 2, 2013, the scandal expanded further. Gao Zhenli admitted that the contaminated oil had been sold to Fu Mao Oil and Ting Hsin Oil, but he denied that it had reached other major manufacturers.

=== Final Verdict ===
On July 24, 2014, the Intellectual Property Court sentenced Gao Zhenli to 12 years in prison for fraud and false product labeling in the Tatung oil contamination case. Additionally, the company was fined NT$38 million. The ruling became final.

1. "大統長基食品廠" [Tatung Chang Chi Foods Co., Ltd.]. www.yes123.com.tw (in Chinese).
2. "大統黑心油18.5億罰款不用繳了！" [Tatung's 1.85 Billion NT Fine for Contaminated Oil is Cancelled!] (in Chinese). 2014-07-13. Archived from the original on 13 July 2014.
3. "想當年…特級橄欖油伴手禮 超搶手" [Back in the Day... Extra Virgin Olive Oil Gift Sets Were All the Rage]. news.chinatimes (in Chinese). Archived from the original on 29 October 2013.
4. "國民黨高官護航大統「黑油亡國」 稽查員爆：忍很久了" [KMT Senior Officials Protect Tatung's 'Contaminated Oil' Scandal: Inspector Reveals 'I've Been Holding Back for a Long Time'] (in Chinese). 2013-11-03. Archived from the original on 3 November 2013.
5. "【動新聞】高官當門神黑心油商「亡國」" [Senior Officials Act as Gatekeepers for Corrupt Oil Business: 'The Fall of the Nation'] (in Chinese). 2013-10-31. Archived from the original on 31 October 2013.
6. "高振利政商關係好 爆關說傳聞" [Gao Zhenli's Strong Political and Business Connections: Rumors of Influence Peddling Surface] (in Chinese). 2013-10-29. Archived from the original on 29 October 2013.
7. "遭隱射是大統「門神」 王惠美喊冤" [Accused of Being Tatung's 'Gatekeeper,' Wang Hui-mei Declares Innocence] (in Chinese). 2014-11-10. Archived from the original on 10 November 2014.
8. "起底 小店起家 一路「混」到油王" [Unveiling the Story: From Small Shop to 'Oil King' Through Controversial Means] (in Chinese). 2013-10-27. Archived from the original on 27 October 2013.
9. "橄欖油疑不純 扣千瓶大統油品" [Suspected Impurity in Olive Oil: 1,000 Bottles of Tatung Products Seized] (in Chinese). 2013-10-19. Archived from the original on 19 October 2013.
10. "大統橄欖油出包！摻銅葉綠素染色劑" [Tatung Olive Oil Scandal: Adulterated with Copper Chlorophyllin Dye] (in Chinese). 2013-10-22. Archived from the original on 22 October 2013.
11. "橄欖油加「銅葉綠素」 大統董座高振利賣7年才道歉" [Tatung Olive Oil Contaminated with 'Copper Chlorophyllin': Chairman Gao Zhenli Apologizes After 7 Years of Sales] (in Chinese). 2013-10-19. Archived from the original on 19 October 2013.
12. "罰大統18.5億 賠償用" [NT$1.85 Billion Fine Imposed on Tatung for Compensation]. libertytimes (in Chinese). Archived from the original on 2 November 2013.
13. "大聯酒品不實 開罰550萬元" [Da Lian Alcohol Products Misleading: Fined NT$5.5 Million] (in Chinese). 2013-10-31. Archived from the original on 31 October 2013.
14. "大統提賠償 現金土地10多億" [Tatung Proposes Compensation: Over NT$1 Billion in Cash and Land] (in Chinese). 2013-11-02. Archived from the original on 2 November 2013.
15. "大統油 高振利否認另流向大廠" [Tatung Oil Scandal: Gao Zhenli Denies Distribution to Other Major Manufacturers] (in Chinese). 2014-02-02. Archived from the original on 2 February 2014.
16. "大統混油 高振利二審判12年" [Tatung Oil Adulteration: Gao Zhenli Sentenced to 12 Years in Second Trial] (in Chinese). 2014-10-10. Archived from the original on 10 October 2014.
17. "大統黑心食用油品案 高振利判刑12年定讞" [Tatung Contaminated Edible Oil Scandal: Gao Zhenli Sentenced to 12 Years, Verdict Finalized]. Human Rights Documents online (in Chinese). doi:10.1163/2210-7975_hrd-0035-2014233.
