= 2009 Kuomintang chairmanship election =

Election in Taiwan

- 26 July 2009
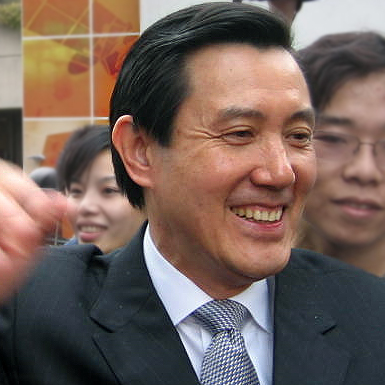
Nominee	Ma Ying-jeou
Popular vote	285,354
Percentage	100%
Chairman before election
Wu Po-hsiung
Elected Chairman
Ma Ying-jeou

The 2009 Kuomintang chairmanship election (Chinese: 2009年中國國民黨主席選舉) was held on 26 July 2009 in Taiwan with Ma Ying-jeou as the sole candidate. This was the fourth direct election of the chairman in the Kuomintang (KMT) history. All registered, due-paying KMT party members were eligible to vote.

Candidate	Total votes cast	Percentage of vote
Ma Ying-jeou (W)	285,354	93.87%
Voter turnout	56.95%	

== Aftermath ==
In his victory speech, Ma promised to enhance cooperation between Kuomintang and the government, deal with party assets and continue efforts to communicate with the opposition Pan-Green Coalition parties. He wished for the KMT to become a party of integrity, democracy and effectiveness. He would be inaugurated as the chairman on the upcoming party congress scheduled on 12 September 2009.

== See also ==
- Elections in Taiwan
- List of leaders of the Kuomintang
