= Liu Yu-you =

Taiwanese politician

- 劉裕猷
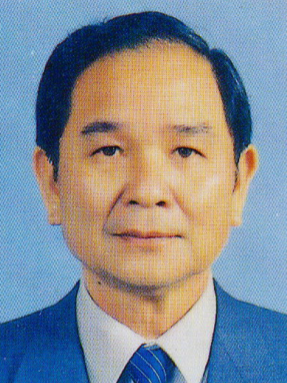

Magistrate of Nantou County
- In office 1 February 1973 – 5 December 1981
- Preceded by: Lin Yang-kang; Ou Shu-wen (acting)
- Succeeded by: Meng Fan-chao (acting); Wu Den-yih

Personal details
- Born: July 5, 1931 Yanping (延平里), Zhushan, Nantou, Taiwan
- Died: September 25, 2002 (aged 71) Taichung Veterans General Hospital (臺中榮總)
- Party: Kuomintang
- Spouse: Lin Xiu-qin (林秀琴)
- Parents: Liu Xian-zhang (劉憲章) (father); Lin Jin-ping (林錦屏) (mother)

Liu Yu-you (traditional Chinese: 劉裕猷; simplified Chinese: 刘裕猷; pinyin: Liú Yùyóu) was a politician in the Republic of China. He served as the Magistrate of Nantou County from 1973 to 1981.
