= Chan Chun-po =

Taiwanese politician

- 詹春柏
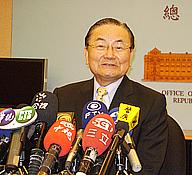

Vice Chairman of the Kuomintang
- In office 12 January 2007 – 30 April 2014
- Chairperson: Ma Ying-jeou; Wu Po-hsiung (acting); Chiang Pin-kung (acting); Wu Po-hsiung; Ma Ying-jeou

Secretary-General of the Kuomintang
- In office 9 September 2009 – 17 December 2009
- Chairperson: Ma Ying-jeou
- Preceded by: Wu Den-yih
- Succeeded by: King Pu-tsung
- In office 27 July 2005 – 13 February 2007
- Chairperson: Ma Ying-jeou
- Preceded by: Lin Fong-cheng
- Succeeded by: Wu Den-yih

Secretary-General to the President
- In office 20 May 2008 – 10 September 2009
- President: Ma Ying-jeou
- Preceded by: Mark Chen
- Succeeded by: Liao Liou-yi

Personal details
- Born: 30 October 1941 (age 84)
- Party: Kuomintang
- Education: Tunghai University (BA); National Chengchi University (MA); Harvard University (MA)

Chan Chun-po (Chinese: 詹春柏; pinyin: Zhān Chūnbǎi; born 30 October 1941) is a Taiwanese politician. He was the Vice Chairperson of the Kuomintang from 12 January 2007 to 30 April 2014.

== Education ==
Chen graduated from Tunghai University with a bachelor's degree in political science in 1965 and earned a master's degree in political science from National Chengchi University in 1967. In 1966, he had won a government scholarship, the Sun Yat-sen Scholarship, to pursue graduate studies abroad. He then earned a Master of Arts (M.A.) in 1970 from Harvard University.

== KMT Secretary-General ==
Chan was appointed as Secretary-General of Kuomintang for the second time on 9 September 2009 by KMT Chairperson Wu Po-hsiung. He was inaugurated to the post during the 18th National Congress of the Kuomintang on 17 October 2009 in Taipei.
