= Lin Yun-sheng =

Taiwanese politician

Lin Yun-sheng MLY
- 林耘生

Member of the Legislative Yuan
- In office 1 February 2005 – 31 January 2008
- Constituency: Nantou County

Personal details
- Born: 1972 (age 53–54)
- Party: Democratic Progressive Party
- Relations: Lin Tsung-nan (father)
- Education: Tunghai University (BA, MA)
- Occupation: politician

Lin Yun-sheng (Chinese: 林耘生; pinyin: Lín Yúnshēng; born 1972) is a Taiwanese politician who served in the Legislative Yuan from 2005 to 2008.

== Education ==
Lin earned bachelor's and master's degrees from Tunghai University and later taught at I-Shou University and MingDao University.

== Career ==
A member of the Democratic Progressive Party, Lin was elected as a Nantou County representative to the Legislative Yuan in 2004. He attempted to aid his father Lin Tsung-nan's 2005 run for the magistracy of Nantou County, stating that, in 2002, competing candidate Tsai Huang-liang had meddled in the affairs of the Taiwan Railways Administration. In 2006, he accused Chinese companies of copyright infringement against Taiwanese brands. Lin sought to join the Legislative Yuan's Judiciary Committee, but was barred from doing so after the Democratic Progressive Party legislative caucus proposed a ban on committee membership for politicians whose family members were subject to current legal proceedings. This provision targeted Lin and his father, Lin Tsung-nan, who was facing corruption charges at the time. The next year, Lin Yun-sheng supported an amendment to Article 1059 of the Civil Law that permitted people use their maternal surname with the permission of both parents. He ran for reelection in 2008, and lost to Wu Den-yih. Lin has received media attention for his connections to convicted criminal Chiang Chin-liang.
