= Lee Chao-ching =

Taiwanese politician

- 李朝卿
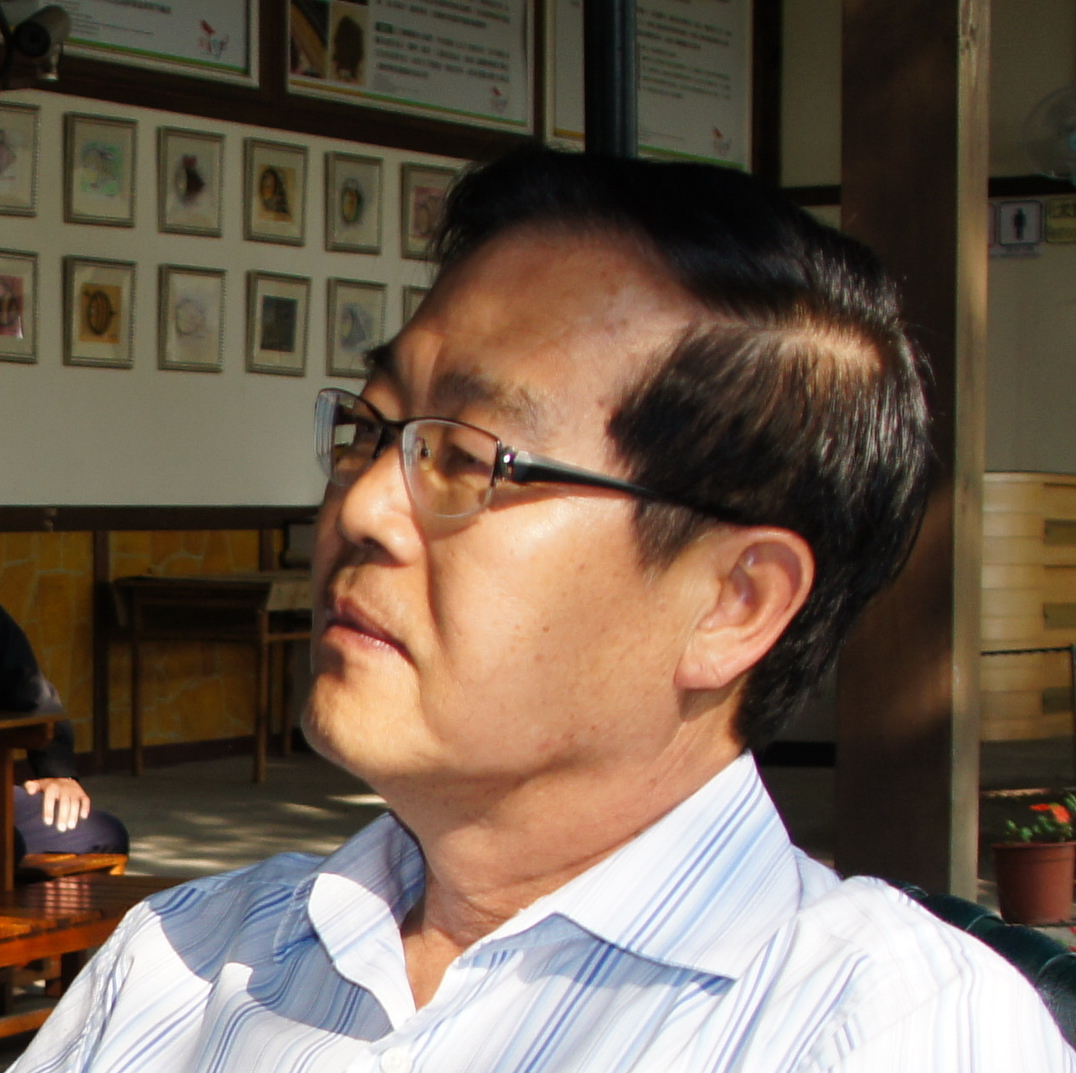

Magistrate of Nantou County
- In office 20 December 2005 – 30 November 2012
- Deputy: Chen Chih-ching
- Preceded by: Lin Tsung-nan
- Succeeded by: Chen Chih-ching (acting)

Personal details
- Born: 29 June 1950 (age 76) Caotun, Nantou County, Taiwan
- Party: Kuomintang
- Education: Tunghai University (BS); Central Taiwan University of Science and Technology (MBA); Cheng Shiu University (MS)
- Criminal details
- Criminal information
- Status: Imprisoned
- Criminal charges: Corruption
- Penalty: 22 years in prison

Lee Chao-ching (Chinese: 李朝卿; pinyin: Lǐ Cháoqīng; Pe̍h-ōe-jī: Lí Tiâu-kheng; born 29 June 1950) is a Taiwanese former politician. A member of the Kuomintang, he served as the 15th and 16th Magistrate of Nantou County from 20 December 2005 until 30 November 2012. He is currently serving a 22-year prison sentence for corruption.

== Education ==
Lee graduated from Tunghai University with a degree in industrial engineering and earned a Master of Business Administration (M.B.A.) from Central Taiwan University of Science and Technology and a master's degree in chemical engineering from Cheng Shiu University.

== Nantou County magistrate ==
Lee assumed the position of Magistrate of Nantou County after winning the 2005 election on 3 December 2005 under the Kuomintang and took office on 20 December 2005. He then again secured his second term of magistrate after winning the 2009 election on 5 December 2009 and assumed office on 20 December 2009.

=== 2012 corruption charges ===
Lee was detained on 30 November 2012 due to corruption charges stemming from his handling of the post-Typhoon Morakot reconstruction project budget. US$10,320 was found in his office, which was alleged to be part of the bribes he had received. The Ministry of Interior immediately relieved Lee from his duties. He was replaced as Nantou Magistrate by his deputy, Chen Chih-ching. Lee was also suspended from the Kuomintang.

In early April 2013, Lee was released in bail. After the release, he filed the application to be reinstated as the Magistrate of Nantou County. However, the MOI, backed by the premier, rejected Lee's application. In August 2015, Lee was handed a prison sentence of thirty years by the Nantou District Court. Upon appeal to the Taiwan High Court, Lee's sentence was reduced to 22 years imprisonment. Lee's appeal for a further reduction in his sentence was rejected by the Supreme Court in January 2025.
