= Zhuangwei =

Rural township in Yilan County, Taiwan

Coordinates: 24.770214°N 121.802276°E

Zhuangwei Township 壯圍鄉 Sōi, Jhuangwei
- Rural township
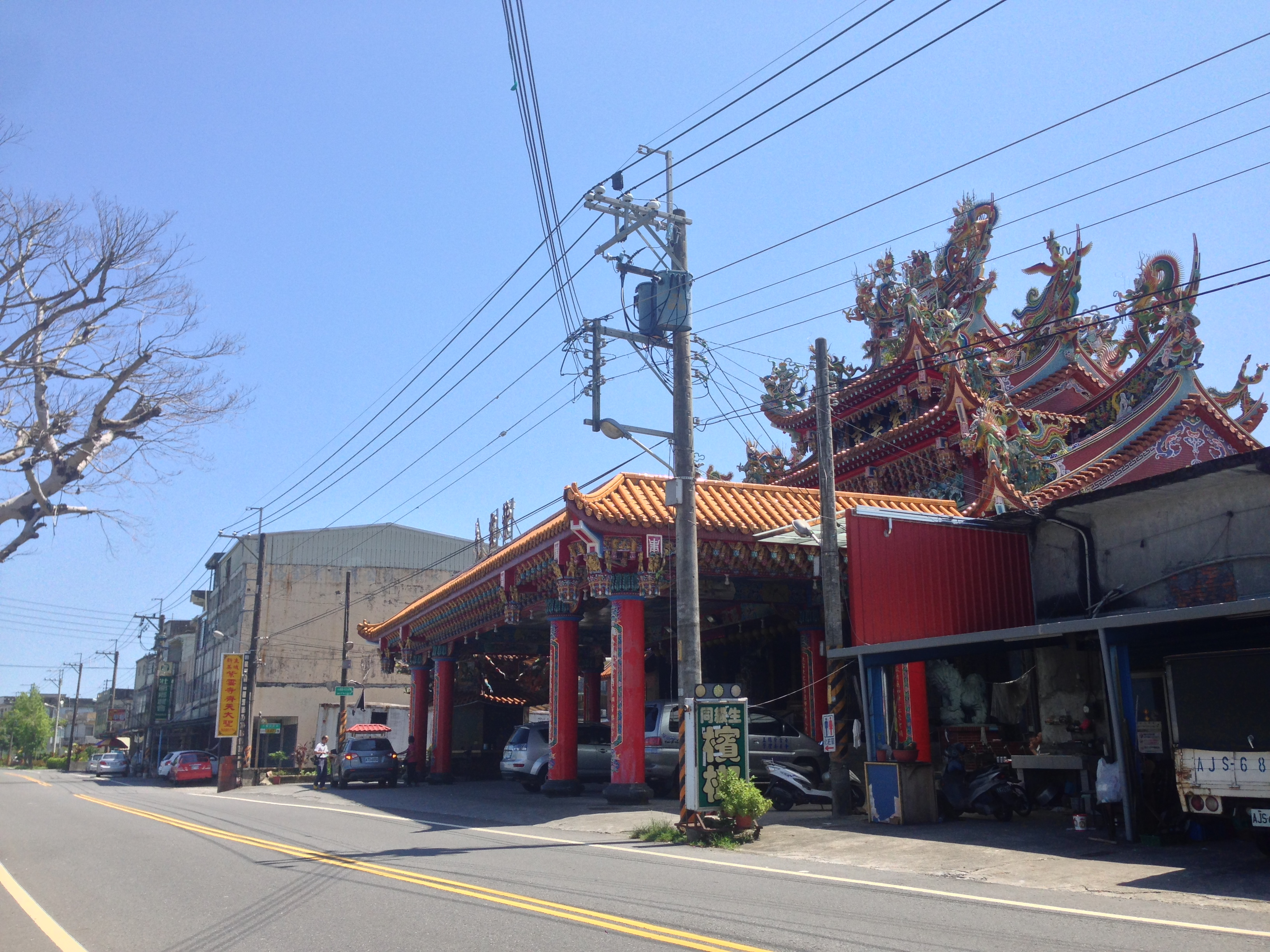

- 宜蘭縣壯圍鄉公所; Jhuangwei Township Office

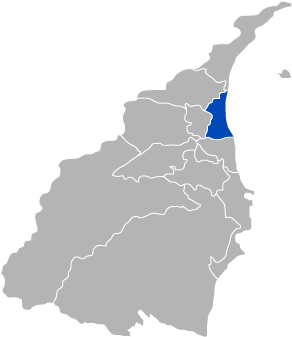
- Zhuangwei Township in Yilan County
- Country: Republic of China (Taiwan)
- Province: Taiwan Province
- County: (Yilan County, Taiwan) Yilan
- Rural villages (村): 14

Government
  - Township Mayor (鄉長): Shen Ching-Shan (沈清山)

Area
  - Total: 38.48 km^{2} (14.86 sq mi)

Population (September 2023)
  - Total: 24,433
  - Density: 635.0/km^{2} (1,645/sq mi)
- Time zone: UTC+8 (National Standard Time)
- Postal code: 263
- Website: www.jw.gov.tw (in Chinese)

Zhuangwei Township or Jhuangwei Township (Chinese: 壯圍鄉; Hanyu Pinyin: Zhuàngwéi Xiāng; Tongyong Pinyin: Jhuàngwéi Siang; Wade–Giles: Chuang^{4}-wei^{2} Hsiang^{1}; Pe̍h-ōe-jī: Chòng-ûi-hiong) is a rural township in eastern Yilan County, Taiwan Province, Republic of China, the smallest in the county.

== Geography ==
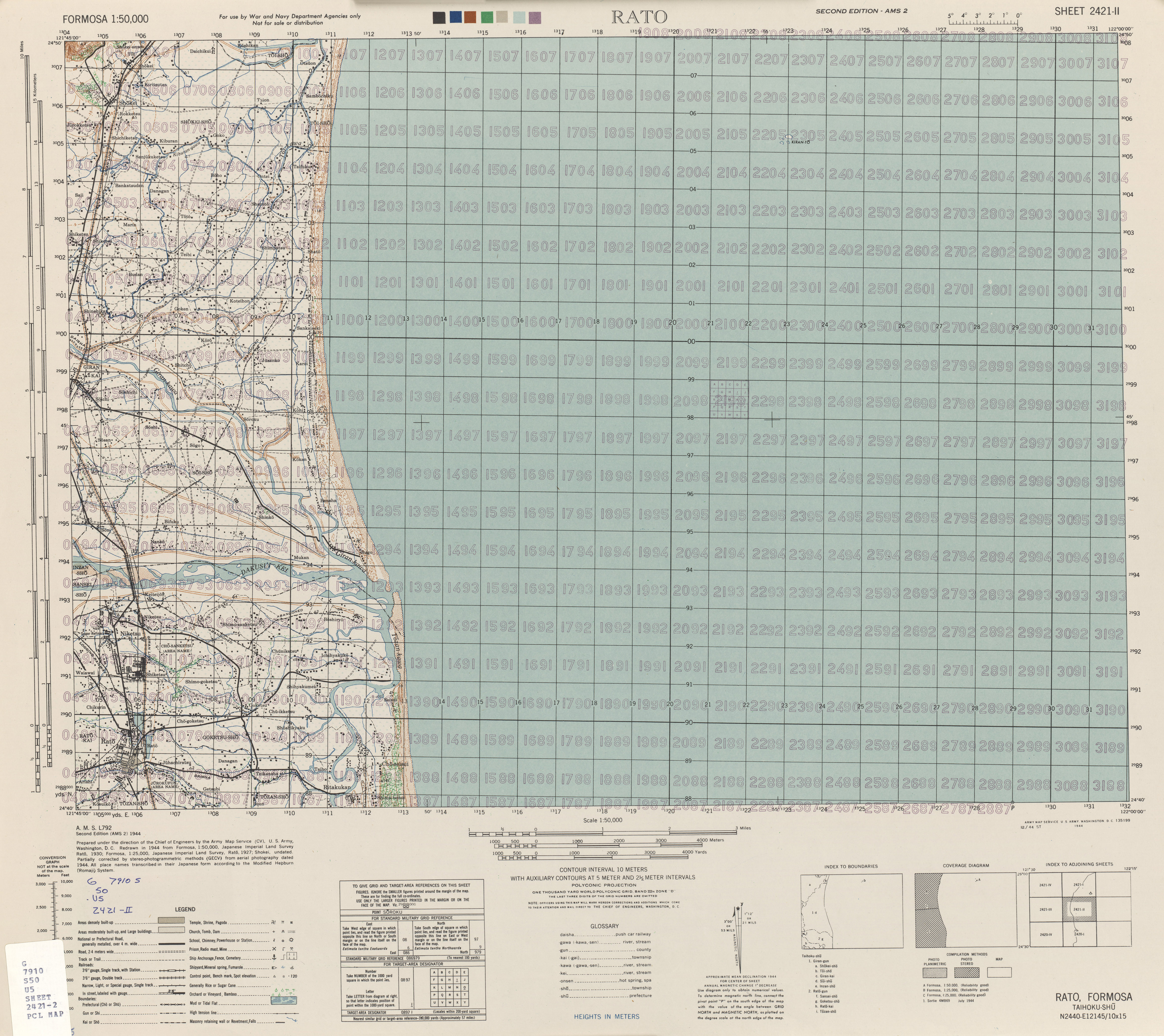
Map including Zhuangwei / Jhuangwei area (1944)

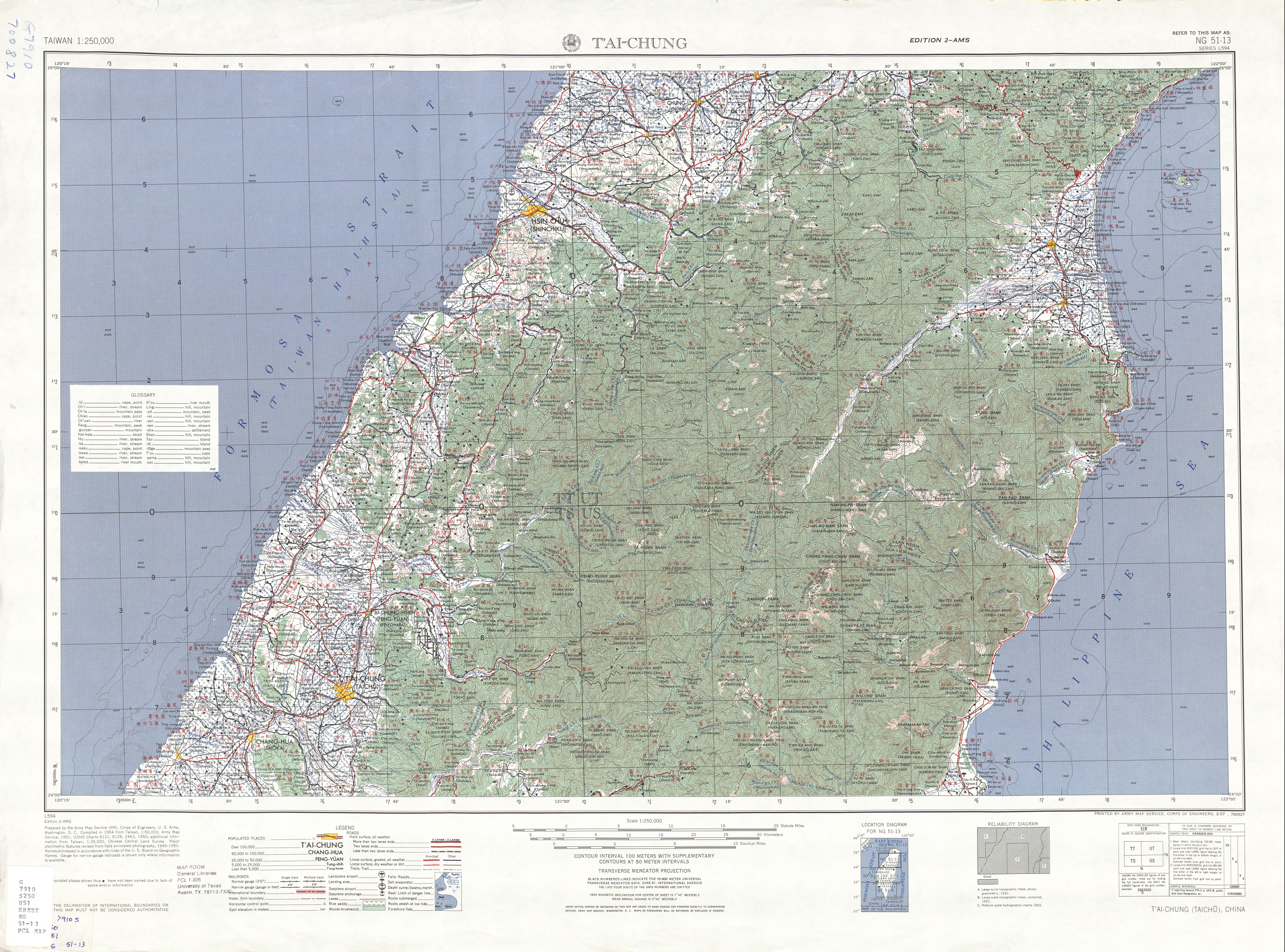
Map including Zhuangwei / Jhuangwei area (1954)

- Area: 38.48 square kilometres (14.86 sq mi)
- Population: 24,433 (September 2023)

== Politics and government ==
=== Administrative divisions ===
The township comprises 14 villages:

- Dafu (大福村), Fuxing/Fusing (復興村), Gonglao (功勞村), Gujie (古結村), Guoling (過嶺村), Guting (古亭村), Jixiang/Jisiang (吉祥村), Meicheng (美城村), Meifu (美福村), Donggang (東港村), Xinnan/Sinnan (新南村), Xinshe/Sinshe (新社村), Yongzhen/Yongjhen (永鎮村) and Zhongxiao/Jhongsiao (忠孝村).

=== Elections ===
The township participated in the 2018 Taiwanese municipal elections supporting the candidacy of Lin Zi-miao (KMT).

== Energy ==
The township government is currently constructing an organic refuse resource center to process 200 tons of refuse daily with a planned capacity of 400 kW.

== Tourist attractions ==
- Wujian Ziyun Temple
- Yongzhen Coast Park

== Transportation ==
The nearest train station to the township is Yilan Station of Taiwan Railway, located in Yilan City.

== Notable natives ==
- Pan Wen-chung, Minister of Education (2016-2018, 2019-)
- Tsai Ling-yi, Second Lady of the Republic of China (2012–2016)
