= List of county magistrates of Nantou =

The magistrate of Nantou is the chief executive of the government of Nantou County. This list includes directly elected magistrates of the county. The incumbent Magistrate is Hsu Shu-hua of Kuomintang since 25 December 2022.

== Directly elected County Magistrates ==
Kuomintang (KMT) Independent New Nation Alliance Dem. Progressive Party (DPP)

№	Portrait	Name (Birth–Death)	Term of Office		Political Party	Term
1		Lee Kuo-chen 李國禎; Lǐ Guózhēn (?–)	1 June 1951	2 June 1954	Kuomintang	1
1		Lee Kuo-chen 李國禎; Lǐ Guózhēn (?–)	2 June 1954	2 June 1957	Kuomintang	2
2		Hung Chiao-jung 洪樵榕; Hóng Qiáoróng (1922–2012)	June 1957	2 June 1960	Kuomintang	3
2		Hung Chiao-jung 洪樵榕; Hóng Qiáoróng (1922–2012)	2 June 1960	2 June 1964	Kuomintang	4
3		Yang Chao-pi 楊昭璧; Yáng Zhāobì (?–1966)	2 June 1964	11 June 1966	Kuomintang	5
–		Lin Yang-kang 林洋港; Lín Yánggǎng (1927–2013)	1 February 1967	2 June 1968	Kuomintang	5
4		Lin Yang-kang 林洋港; Lín Yánggǎng (1927–2013)	2 June 1968	16 June 1972	Kuomintang	6
–		Ou Shu-wen 歐樹文; Ōu Shùwén (?–)	16 June 1972	1 February 1973	Kuomintang	6
5		Liu Yu-you 劉裕猷; Liú Yùyóu (1931–2002)	1 February 1973	20 December 1977	Kuomintang	7
5		Liu Yu-you 劉裕猷; Liú Yùyóu (1931–2002)	20 December 1977	5 December 1981	Kuomintang	8
–		Meng Fan-chao 孟繁超; Mèng Fánchāo (?–)	8 December 1981	20 December 1981	Kuomintang	8
6		Wu Den-yih 吳敦義; Wú Dūnyì (1948–)	20 December 1981	20 December 1985	Kuomintang	9
6		Wu Den-yih 吳敦義; Wú Dūnyì (1948–)	20 December 1985	20 December 1989	Kuomintang	10
7		Lin Yuan-lang 林源朗; Lín Yuánlǎng (1940–)	20 December 1989	20 December 1993	Kuomintang	11
7		Lin Yuan-lang 林源朗; Lín Yuánlǎng (1940–)	20 December 1993	20 December 1997	Kuomintang	12
8		Peng Pai-hsien 彭百顯; Péng Bǎixiǎn (1949–)	20 December 1997	14 November 2000	Independent	13
		Peng Pai-hsien 彭百顯; Péng Bǎixiǎn (1949–)	20 December 1997	14 November 2000	New Nation Alliance	13
–		Lai Ying-fang 賴英芳; Lài Yīngfāng (1959–)	14 November 2000	13 January 2001	Kuomintang	13
8		Peng Pai-hsien 彭百顯; Péng Bǎixiǎn (1949–)	13 January 2001	20 December 2001	New Nation Alliance	13
9		Lin Tsung-nan 林宗男; Lín Zōngnán (1942–2010)	20 December 2001	20 December 2005	Democratic Progressive Party	14
		Lin Tsung-nan 林宗男; Lín Zōngnán (1942–2010)	20 December 2001	20 December 2005	Independent	14
10		Lee Chao-ching 李朝卿; Lǐ Cháoqīng (1950–)	20 December 2005	20 December 2009	Kuomintang	15
10		Lee Chao-ching 李朝卿; Lǐ Cháoqīng (1950–)	20 December 2009	30 November 2012	Kuomintang	16
–		Chen Chih-ching 陳志清; Chén Zhìqīng (1952–)	30 November 2012	25 December 2014	Kuomintang	16
11		Lin Ming-chen 林明溱; Lín Míngzhēn (1951–)	25 December 2014	25 December 2018	Kuomintang	17
11		Lin Ming-chen 林明溱; Lín Míngzhēn (1951–)	25 December 2018	25 December 2022	Kuomintang	18
12		Hsu Shu-hua 許淑華; Xǔ Shúhuá (1975–)	25 December 2022	Incumbent	Kuomintang	19
