= Peng Pai-hsien =

Taiwanese politician

Peng Pai-hsien MLY
- 彭百顯
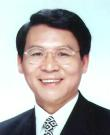

Nantou County Magistrate
- In office 13 January 2001 – 20 December 2001
- Preceded by: Lai Ying-fang (acting)
- Succeeded by: Lin Tsung-nan
- In office 20 December 1997 – 14 November 2000
- Preceded by: Lin Yuan-lang
- Succeeded by: Lai Ying-fang (acting)

Member of the Legislative Yuan
- In office 1 February 1990 – 20 December 1997
- Constituency: Nantou County

Personal details
- Born: 14 June 1949 (age 76) Guoxing, Nantou County, Taiwan
- Party: Democratic Progressive Party (until 1997)
- Spouse: Wu Wen-wan (吳文婉)
- Education: Chinese Culture University (BA, MA); University of London (MSc)

Peng Pai-hsien (Chinese: 彭百顯; born 14 June 1949) is a Taiwanese politician.

== Political career ==
He served in the Legislative Yuan from 1990 to 1997 as a member of the Democratic Progressive Party. Peng was a member of the DPP's Justice Alliance faction until he left the party in 1997 to run for the Nantou County magistracy as an independent. Peng left the legislature on 20 December 1997 to take office as Nantou County magistrate. Nantou County was hit hard by the 1999 Jiji earthquake, and in November 2000, Peng was charged with corruption while the Nantou District Prosecutors' Office investigated financial improprieties in the aftermath of the rescue effort. Peng was indicted in January 2001, but returned to his duties as magistrate. The Supreme Court halted appeals on the case in July 2010, ending legal proceedings against Peng.

In September 2019, the Formosa Alliance announced that its ticket for the 2020 presidential election included Peng as Annette Lu's running mate. Lu and Peng suspended their campaign on 2 November 2019.

After he left the Nantou County magistracy, Peng became an instructor at Kainan University. He is married to Wu Wen-wan.
