= Lin Tsung-nan =

Taiwanese politician

Lin Tsung-nan MLY
- 林宗男
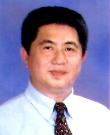

Nantou County Magistrate
- In office 20 December 2001 – 20 December 2005
- Preceded by: Peng Pai-hsien
- Succeeded by: Lee Chao-ching

Member of the Legislative Yuan
- In office 1 February 1999 – 20 December 2001
- Constituency: Nantou County

Personal details
- Born: 26 June 1942 Sōton, Nantō, Taichū Prefecture, Taiwan, Empire of Japan
- Died: 19 November 2010 (aged 68) Caotun, Nantou, Taiwan
- Party: Democratic Progressive Party (until 2005)
- Relations: Lin Yun-sheng (son)
- Education: Meiji University
- Occupation: politician

Lin Tsung-nan (Chinese: 林宗男; pinyin: Lín Zōngnán; Pe̍h-ōe-jī: Lîm Chong-lâm; 26 June 1942 – 19 November 2010) was a Taiwanese politician.

Lin earned a master's degree from Meiji University and began his political career as a member of the Taiwan Provincial Assembly. He represented his native Nantou County in the Legislative Yuan from 1999 to 2001, and led the Democratic Progressive Party caucus. Lin was elected Nantou County Magistrate in 2001 and left the legislature. He ran for reelection in 2005, leading a May primary against fellow DPP member Tsai Huang-liang. However, Lin fell behind and chose to leave the party to launch an independent reelection bid. Both Lin and Tsai lost to Kuomintang candidate Lee Chao-ching. The Democratic Progressive Party supported Lin's unsuccessful bid for the magistracy in 2009, which he again lost to Lee. Because Lin had left the party of his own accord in 2005, he was not permitted to apply for membership until 2010. He died that year on 19 November at home in Caotun, Nantou of adenocarcinoma of the lung.

Lin's son Lin Yun-sheng has also served in the Legislative Yuan.
