= Lai Ying-fang =

Taiwanese politician

Lai Ying-fang MLY
- 賴英芳
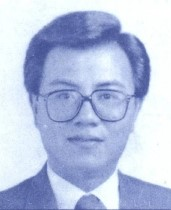

Acting Nantou County Magistrate
- In office 14 November 2000 – 13 January 2001
- Preceded by: Peng Pai-hsien
- Succeeded by: Peng Pai-hsien

Member of the Legislative Yuan
- In office 1 February 1993 – 31 January 1996
- Constituency: Nantou County

Personal details
- Born: 1959 (age 66–67)

Lai Ying-fang Chinese: 賴英芳; born 1959) is a Taiwanese politician.

Lai was elected to the Legislative Yuan as a political independent representing Nantou County in 1992. He then served as deputy magistrate of Nantou County under Peng Pai-hsien. When Peng was removed from office, Lai assumed the Nantou County magistracy on an acting basis.
