= 18th Congress =

18th Congress may refer to

- 18th Congress of the All-Union Communist Party (Bolsheviks) (1939)
- 18th Congress of the Philippines (2019–2022)
- 18th National Congress of the Chinese Communist Party (2012)
- 18th National Congress of the Kuomintang (2009)
- 18th United States Congress (1823–1825)
