= Meng Fan-chao =

Politician from Taiwan

- 孟繁超

Magistrate of Nantou County (acting)
- In office 8 December 1981 – 20 December 1981
- Preceded by: Liu Yu-you
- Succeeded by: Wu Den-yih

Personal details
- Party: Kuomintang

Meng Fan-chao (Chinese: 孟繁超; pinyin: Mèng Fánchāo) was a Taiwanese politician. He served as the Acting Magistrate of Nantou County in 1981.
