= Chen Chih-ching =

Taiwanese lawyer

- 陳志清
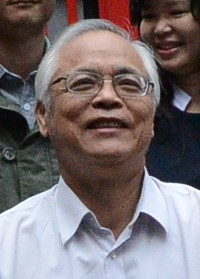

Minister of Council of Agriculture of the Republic of China
- In office 1 February 2016 – 20 May 2016
- Preceded by: Chen Bao-ji
- Succeeded by: Tsao Chi-hung

Magistrate of Nantou County (acting)
- In office 30 November 2012 – 25 December 2014
- Preceded by: Lee Chao-ching
- Succeeded by: Lin Ming-chen

Personal details
- Born: 11 January 1952 (age 74) Nantou County, Taiwan
- Party: Kuomintang
- Education: Soochow University (LLB); National Chung Hsing University (LLM)

Chen Chih-ching (Chinese: 陳志清; pinyin: Chén Zhìqīng; Pe̍h-ōe-jī: Tân Chì-chheng; born 11 January 1952) is a Taiwanese lawyer. He was the Minister of Council of Agriculture in 2016. He was the Acting Magistrate of Nantou County from Deputy Magistrate position since 30 November 2012 until 25 December 2014 after incumbent Magistrate Lee Chao-ching was suspended from his post due to alleged corruption scandal.

== Education ==
Chen earned a bachelor's degree in law from Soochow University and a master's degree in law from National Chung Hsing University.

== Nantou County Magistracy ==
=== 2014 Chinese New Year ===
During Chinese New Year celebration on 5 February 2014, Chen, accompanied by representative from Taiwan Provincial Government, Taiwan Provincial Consultative Council and Nantou County Government attended the celebration. He expressed his gratitude to colleagues in the county government for their contributions throughout the year and encouraged all of the departments to endeavor for the upcoming Lantern Festival.
