= Lin Yuan-lang =

Taiwanese politician (1940–2026)

- 林源朗
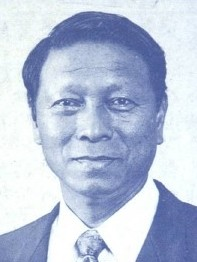

Magistrate of Nantou County
- In office 20 December 1989 – 20 December 1997
- Preceded by: Wu Den-yih
- Succeeded by: Peng Pai-hsien

Personal details
- Born: 28 December 1940 Taiwan, Empire of Japan
- Died: 27 March 2026 (aged 85)
- Party: Kuomintang

Lin Yuan-lang (Chinese: 林源朗; pinyin: Lín Yuánlǎng; 28 December 1940 – 27 March 2026) was a Taiwanese politician. He served as the Magistrate of Nantou County from 1989 to 1997.

Lin died on 27 March 2026, at the age of 85.
