= Ma Wen-chun =

Taiwanese politician

Ma Wen-chun MLY
- 馬文君
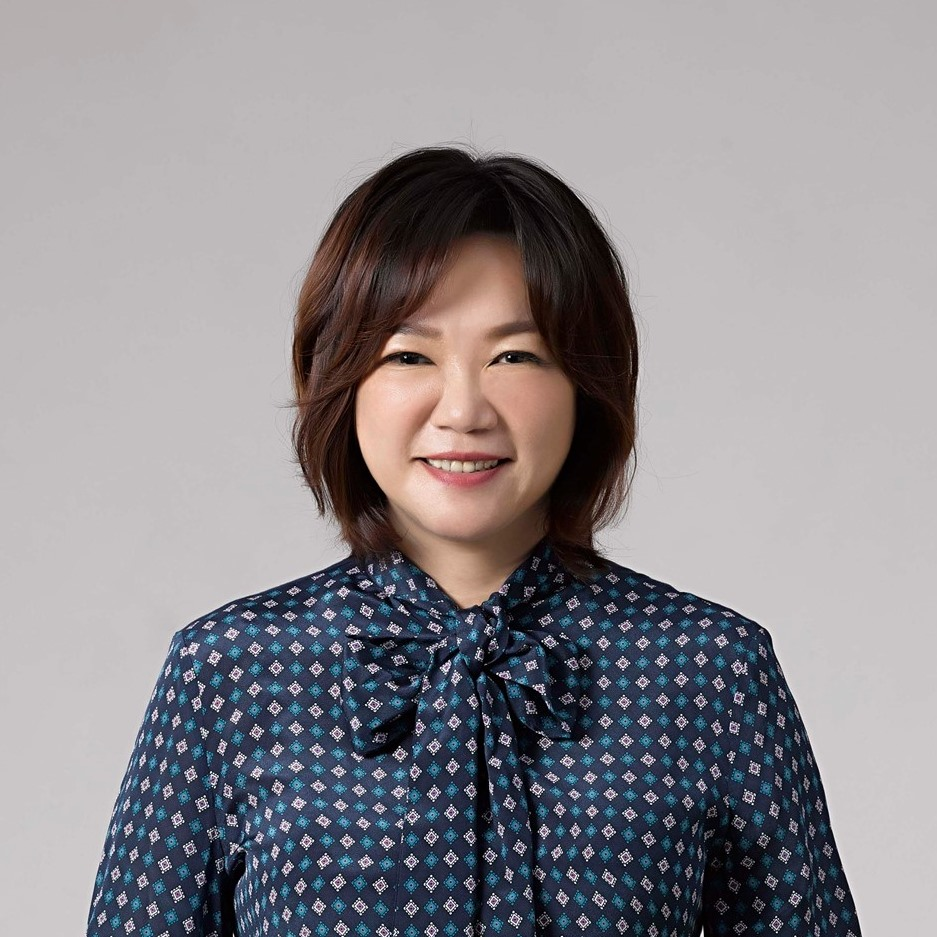
- Official portrait, 2020

Member of the Legislative Yuan
- Incumbent
- Assumed office 18 December 2009
- Preceded by: Wu Den-yih
- Constituency: Nantou County 1st

Personal details
- Born: December 1, 1965 (age 60) Puli, Nantou County, Taiwan
- Party: Kuomintang
- Education: Chia Nan University of Pharmacy and Science (BPharm); Feng Chia University (MA)

Ma Wen-chun (Chinese: 馬文君; pinyin: Mǎ Wénjūn; Wade–Giles: Ma Wen-chün; born 1 December 1965) is a Taiwanese politician. A member of the Kuomintang, she has served in the Legislative Yuan since 2009.

== Education ==
Ma earned a Bachelor of Pharmacy (B.Pharm.) from Chia Nan University of Pharmacy and Science and a master's degree in management development from Feng Chia University.

== Career ==
Ma has served in the Legislative Yuan since 2009. She is on the legislature's Foreign Affairs and National Defense Committee since 2020.

== Controversies ==
In October 2023, she was publicly accused of attempting to hinder Taiwan's domestic submarine program by outing foreign individuals involved in the program and providing classified information on the program to the People's Republic of China.

After the head of the submarine program commented that an unspecified legislator had interfered with the program, Ma said on Facebook, "If you name me, I'll have to sue you"; she was then named by her legislative colleagues.

DPP legislative candidate Justin Wu and political commentator Lee Zheng-hao filed suit against Ma, accusing her of treason, at the High Prosecutors' Office. Ma previously confirmed in a public post that her office mailed materials relating to the submarine program to the Korean Mission in Taipei in January 2022, but said she also passed them along to the Ministry of National Defense and the Ministry of Justice Investigation Bureau. If convicted, Ma could face a sentence of "not less than three years but not more than ten years."

In December 2023, Ma was accused of illegally building a residential villa on protected farmland in Puli that is intended for agricultural use.
