= Lin Fong-cheng =

Politician from Taiwan

- 林豐正
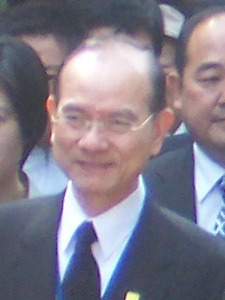

Vice Chairman of the Kuomintang
- In office 11 April 2007 – 30 April 2014
- Chairman: Wu Po-hsiung; Ma Ying-jeou

Secretary-General of the Kuomintang
- In office 20 March 2000 – 27 July 2005
- Chairman: Lien Chan
- Preceded by: Huang Kun-huei
- Succeeded by: Chan Chun-po

Minister of Transportation and Communications
- In office 1 April 1998 – 20 May 2000
- Preceded by: Tsay Jaw-yang
- Succeeded by: Yeh Chu-lan

Minister of the Interior
- In office 10 June 1996 – 15 May 1997
- Preceded by: Huang Kun-huei
- Succeeded by: Yeh Chin-fong

Magistrate of Taipei County
- In office 20 December 1981 – 20 December 1989
- Preceded by: Shao En-hsin; Wu Tseng-wen (acting)
- Succeeded by: You Ching

Personal details
- Born: 20 March 1940 (age 86) Banqiao, Taiwan, Empire of Japan
- Party: Kuomintang
- Education: National Chung Hsing University (LLB)

Lin Fong-cheng (Chinese: 林豐正; pinyin: Lín Fēngzhèng; born 20 March 1940) is a Taiwanese politician. He was the vice chairman of the Kuomintang from April 2007 to April 2014.

== Kuomintang Secretary-General ==
=== 2005 mainland China visit ===
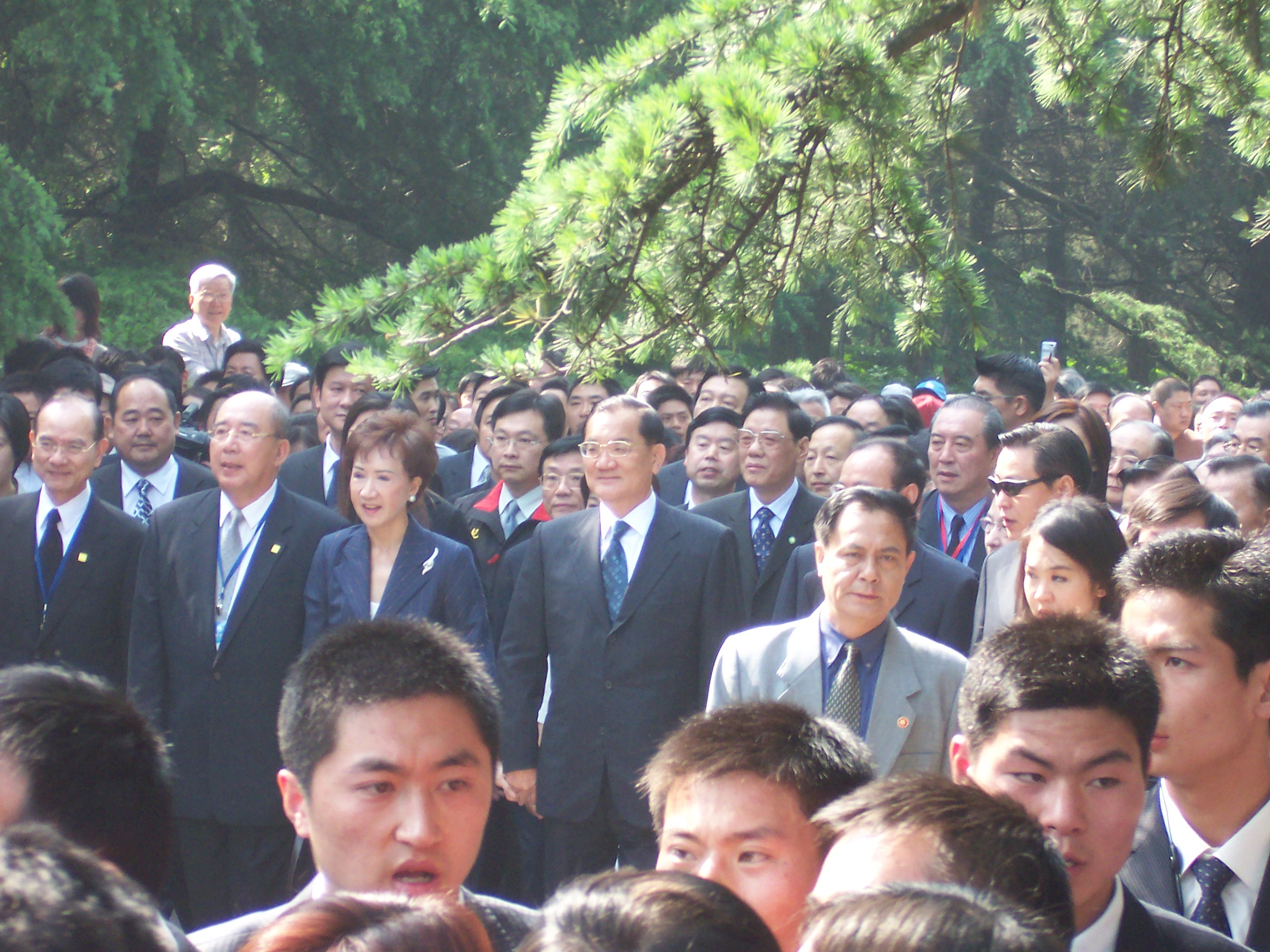
Lin and other Pan-Blue officials in Nanjing in 2005.

In April 2005, Lin joined Lien Chan and other Pan-Blue officials to visit mainland China. Prior to their departure, Lin said that the trip aimed to seek constructive dialogue on the peaceful development of cross-strait relations.

== Kuomintang vice chairmanship ==
=== May 2009 mainland China visit ===
In May 2009, Lin joined Wu Po-hsiung and other Kuomintang high officials to visit mainland China for an eight-day visit. He and the delegations visited several cities, including Beijing, Hangzhou, Nanjing and Chongqing.

=== July 2009 mainland China visit ===
In July 2009, Lin and delegates participated in the 5th Cross-Strait Economic, Trade and Culture Forum in Changsha, Hunan, on 11–12 July. The forum ended with a joint proposal to promote cultural exchanges across the Taiwan Strait. After the forum, they visited Mawangdui.

=== 2013 cross-strait forum ===
In June 2013, Lin attended a cross-strait forum in Xiamen, Fujian, in which Chinese officials unveiled more measures to increase exchanges and cooperation with Taiwan. The forum was attended by Zhang Zhijun, Director of Taiwan Affairs Office, and Yu Zhengsheng, Chairman of the Chinese People's Political Consultative Conference.

=== April 2014 mainland China visit ===
In early April 2014, Lin visited Xi'an, Shaanxi, to meet with Zhao Zhengyong, the secretary of the Shaanxi Provincial Committee of the Chinese Communist Party. They attended a public memorial ceremony for the Yellow Emperor. Zhao made a remark saying that Lin had made great efforts to promote the cross-strait exchanges and cooperation, and added that people from both sides are family. He also hoped that the two sides could appreciate the hard-won prospect, further expand the cooperation and benefit the people.
