= Tsai Ling-yi =

Second Lady of Taiwan

- 蔡令怡
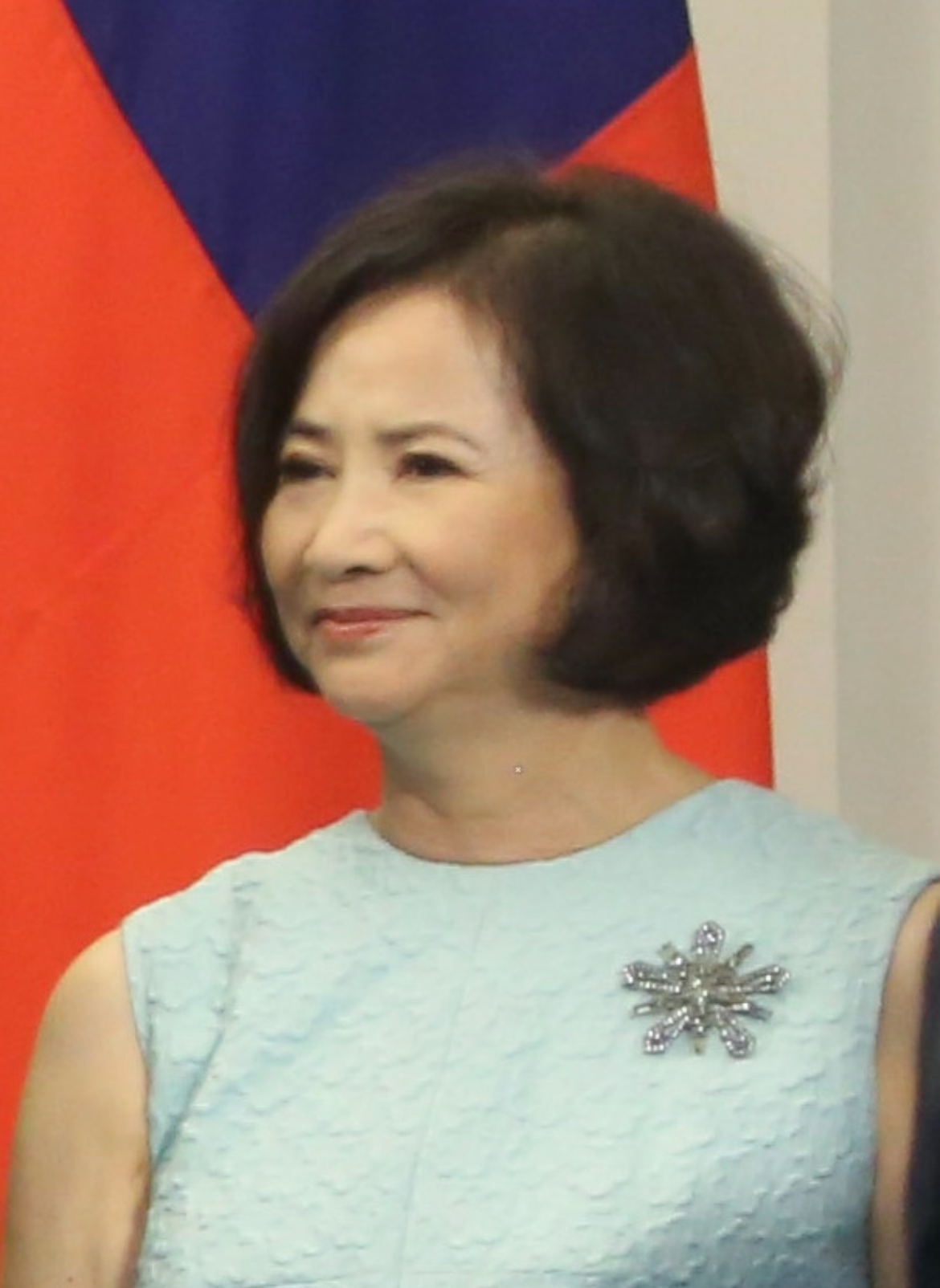
- Tsai in 2015

9th Second Lady of Taiwan
- In office 20 May 2012 – 20 May 2016
- Vice President: Wu Den-yih
- Preceded by: Susan Chu
- Succeeded by: Luo Feng-ping

Spouse of the Prime Minister of Taiwan
- In office 10 September 2009 – 6 February 2012
- Prime Minister: Wu Den-yih
- Preceded by: Chien Ming-sai
- Succeeded by: Ko Chang-ju

Personal details
- Born: 6 November 1952 (age 73) Zhuangwei, Yilan County, Taiwan
- Spouse: Wu Den-yih
- Children: 3 sons and 1 daughter

Tsai Ling-yi (Chinese: 蔡令怡; pinyin: Cài Lìngyí; born 6 November 1952) was the Second Lady of the Republic of China from 2012 to 2016. She is the wife of Wu Den-yih, the former Vice President of the Republic of China.

Born as Tsai Ying-tao (蔡櫻桃) in a fishing village in Yilan County, Tsai married Wu Den-yih in 1970, and has four children. She helped her husband's constituency service in Nantou County when he was a Member of the Legislative Yuan, and also actively participated in political campaigns of Wu Den-yih and Kuomintang.
