= 18th National Congress of the Kuomintang =

The 18th National Congress of the Kuomintang (Chinese: 中國國民黨第十八次全國代表大会) was the eighteenth national congress of the Kuomintang political party, held on 17 October 2009 at Xinzhuang Baseball Stadium, Taipei, Taiwan.

== History ==
The 18th congress was originally planned to be held earlier on 12 September 2013 but was postponed to address the relief efforts of Typhoon Morakot.

== Results ==
The 18th congress saw the inauguration of Ma Ying-jeou to become Chairman of the Kuomintang for the second time after winning the chairmanship election held on 29 July 2009, succeeding the incumbent KMT Chairman Wu Po-hsiung who was retiring. Former Chairman Wu and Lien Chan were appointed as Honorary Chairmen to assist Chairman Ma in Taiwan's external affairs and cross-strait relations, respectively. Chan Chun-po, the Secretary-General to the President was inaugurated as the Secretary-General of the Kuomintang.

== Reactions outside Taiwan ==
Mainland China - CPC General Secretary Hu Jintao sent a congratulatory message to Chairman Ma. In response, Ma also gave a warm reply.

== See also ==
- Kuomintang
