= Wu Po-hsiung =

Taiwanese politician (born 1939)

- 吳伯雄
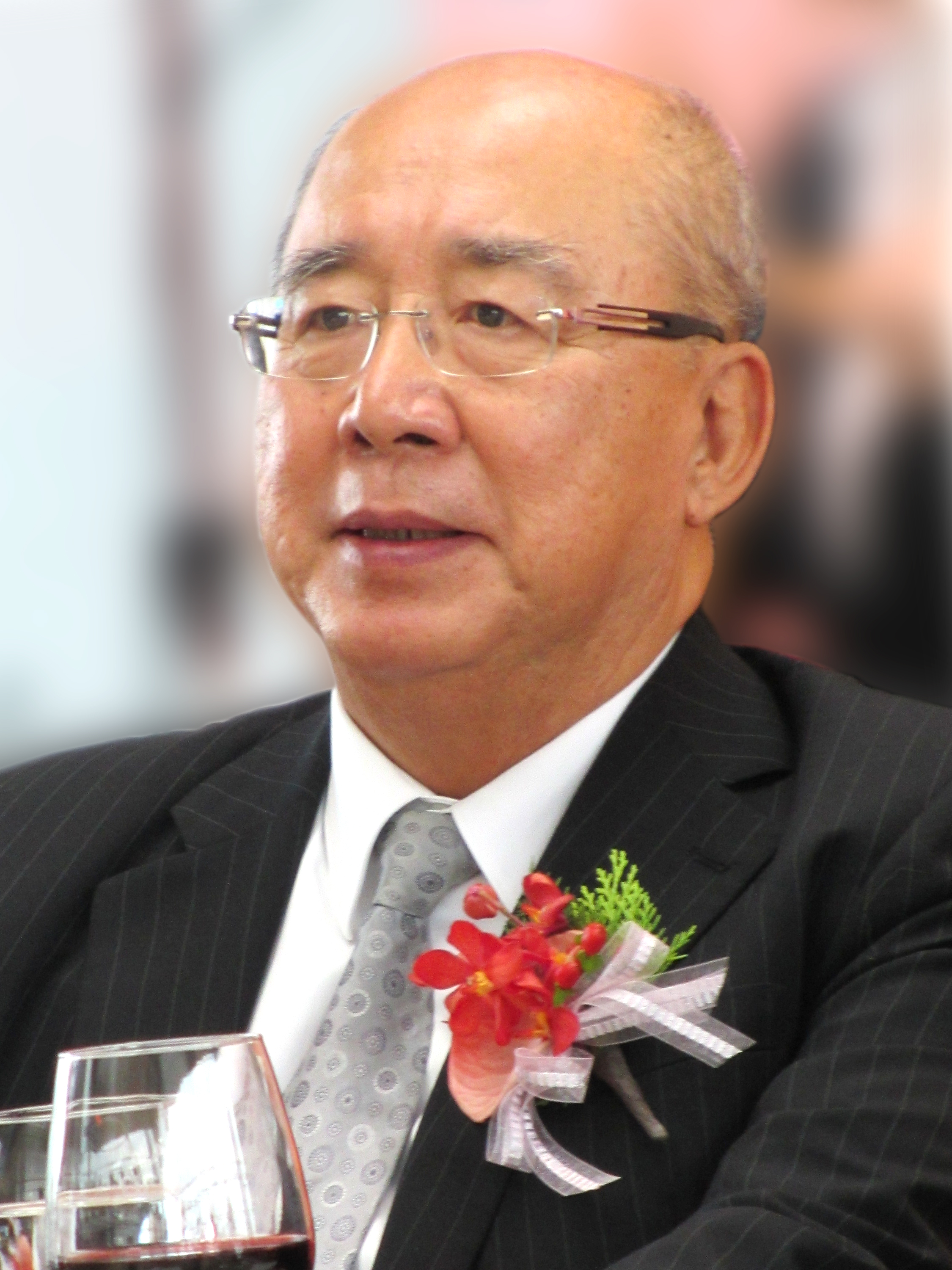
- Wu in 2012

5th Chairman of the Kuomintang
- In office 11 April 2007 – 17 October 2009
- Preceded by: Chiang Pin-kung
- Succeeded by: Ma Ying-jeou
- Acting; 13 February 2007 – 14 March 2007
- Preceded by: Ma Ying-jeou
- Succeeded by: Chiang Pin-kung

Vice Chairman of the Kuomintang
- In office 18 June 2000 – 11 April 2007
- Chairman: Lien Chan; Ma Ying-jeou

Secretary-General of the Kuomintang
- In office 16 August 1996 – 11 December 1997
- Chairman: Lee Teng-hui
- Preceded by: Hsu Shui-teh
- Succeeded by: John Chiang

Secretary-General to the President
- In office 13 December 1994 – 3 August 1996
- President: Lee Teng-hui
- Deputy: Raymond R. M. Tai
- Preceded by: Chiang Yang-shih
- Succeeded by: Huang Kun-huei

Minister of the Interior
- In office 1 June 1991 – 15 February 1994
- Preceded by: Hsu Shui-teh
- Succeeded by: Huang Kun-huei
- In office 1 June 1984 – 22 July 1988
- Preceded by: Lin Yang-kang
- Succeeded by: Hsu Shui-teh

8th Mayor of Taipei
- In office 25 July 1988 – 2 June 1990
- Preceded by: Hsu Shui-teh
- Succeeded by: Huang Ta-chou

Magistrate of Taoyuan
- In office 1 February 1973 – 20 December 1976
- Preceded by: Hsu Hsin-chih; Lee Shu-you (acting)
- Succeeded by: Weng Chien (acting); Hsu Hsin-liang

Personal details
- Born: 19 June 1939 (age 87) Shinchiku Prefecture, Taiwan, Empire of Japan
- Party: Kuomintang
- Relations: John Wu (son)
- Education: National Cheng Kung University (BS)

Wu Po-hsiung
- Traditional Chinese: 吳伯雄
- Simplified Chinese: 吴伯雄
Transcriptions
Standard Mandarin
- Hanyu Pinyin: Wú Bóxióng
Southern Min
- Hokkien POJ: Ngô Peh-hiông

Wu Po-hsiung (Chinese: 吳伯雄; pinyin: Wú Bóxióng; born 19 June 1939) is a Taiwanese politician served as the 8th mayor of Taipei from 1988 to 1990 and as the chairman of the Kuomintang from 2007 to 2009. Previously, he was also interior minister (1984–1988) and secretary-general to the president (1991–1996). Wu was nominated as honorary chairman of the Kuomintang when he was succeeded by Ma Ying-jeou as the chairman of the Kuomintang.

== Early life and education ==
Wu was born on 19 June 1939 in Zhongli, Taoyuan, the third of eight sons. He belonged to a prominent Hakka Chinese family whose ancestral home was in Yongding, Longyan, Fujian. His father, Wu Hong-lin (吳鴻麟; 1899–1995), was a surgeon who graduated from Taihoku Imperial University, worked in the Japanese Red Cross Society, and began practicing ophthalmology in 1930. His mother, Lin Fang-lan (林訪蘭), came from a prominent family in Toufen and held leadership positions in several women's organizations in the Zhongli area. His grandfather, Wu Rongdi (吳榮棣; 1863–1937), attained the Qing imperial examination rank of xiucai in 1892 and founded a poetry society in Zhongli in 1921.

After World War II, Hong-lin served as speaker of the Taoyuan County Council and as magistrate of Taoyuan County from 1960 to 1964. When Wu as a child, his uncle Wu Hung-chi (吳鴻麒), a judge on the Taiwan High Court and the twin brother of Wu's father, was arrested and killed during the February 28 incident in 1947.

After elementary school, Wu moved to Taipei to attend the Affiliated Senior High School of National Taiwan Normal University (HSNU). After graduating from HSNU in 1958, he enrolled at National Cheng Kung University (NCKU) to study industrial management and business management. He graduated in 1962 with a bachelor's degree in management science. While an undergraduate, Wu joined the Kuomintang in 1961.

== Early career and entry into politics ==
After graduating from college in 1962, Wu enlisted in the Republic of China Armed Forces as a reserve officer in the Political Warfare Bureau. During his military service, he was selected to serve as an itinerant Three Principles of the People instructor. After completing his military service, Wu taught for two years, from 1964 to 1966, at the Taiwan Provincial Zhongli Commercial Vocational School. In 1964, he married Dai Meiyu (戴美玉).

In 1966, Wu left teaching to work as a clerk for the Hsinchu District Mutual Savings Company (新竹區合會儲蓄股份有限公司). He entered politics in 1968, contesting the fourth Taiwan Provincial Council election in 1968. After the election was held on 21 April 1968, Wu became the youngest member elected to the Provincial Council.

== Magistrate of Taoyuan ==
Wu ran in the seventh Taoyuan County magistrate election on December 23, 1972, as the KMT candidate representing the southern, predominantly Hakka part of the county centered on Zhongli. His candidacy followed an informal system of regional rotation in Taoyuan politics under which the magistracy alternated between politicians from the county's northern, predominantly Hoklo, districts and its southern Hakka districts. Although Huang Yu-chiao (黃玉嬌) had initially sought to contest the election, she was unable to stand after receiving an eight-month criminal sentence, leaving Wu as the only candidate on the ballot. Wu received 261,889 votes and was elected with a voter turnout of 73.54 percent. He took office on February 1, 1973, succeeding Hsu Hsin-chih, and became the youngest county magistrate then serving in Taiwan.

Much of Wu's tenure coincided with a period of rapid industrialization and large-scale infrastructure construction in Taoyuan. His county government cooperated with the central government's Ten Major Construction Projects, including the acquisition of more than 1,000 ha (2,500 acres) of land for what became Taoyuan International Airport, land acquisition for the construction of the north–south freeway, and the development of large industrial districts.

In 1976, while still serving as magistrate, Wu was elected a member of the KMT Central Committee. He resigned as county magistrate in August 1976—before completing his term—to become director of the Taiwan Provincial Tobacco and Wine Monopoly Bureau. Provincial government member Weng Chien (翁鈐) subsequently served as acting magistrate for the remainder of the term.

== ROC Interior Ministry ==
Wu became the Ministry of the Interior twice in 1984–1988 and 1991–1994.

=== ROC citizens permitted to visit China ===
On 15 October 1987, Wu announced the lifting of prohibition of ROC citizens to travel to the Mainland Area. Citizens were allowed to do so for family visits.

== KMT vice chairmanship ==
Wu was the first vice-chairman of the main opposition Kuomintang party after Kuomintang lost in the 2000 ROC presidential election to the Democratic Progressive Party.

== KMT chairmanship ==
After Chairman Ma Ying-jeou resigned on 13 February 2007, he became the acting chairman. Wu, however, subsequently resigned his post as acting chairman and member of the Central Standing Committee on 14 March 2007 to compete in the KMT chairmanship by-election scheduled for 7 April 2007. Ma announced his support for Wu for chairmanship.

Wu eventually won the party chairmanship election and became KMT Chairman on 11 April 2007. He garnered about 90% of votes cast, defeated KMT legislator Hung Hsiu-chu. Of all eligible voters, about 53% voted.

Candidate	Total votes cast	Percentage of vote
Wu Poh-hsiung	156,499	87.0%
Hung Hsiu-chu	23,447	13.0%
Voter turnout	53%

== Cross-strait relations ==
=== 2005 China visit ===
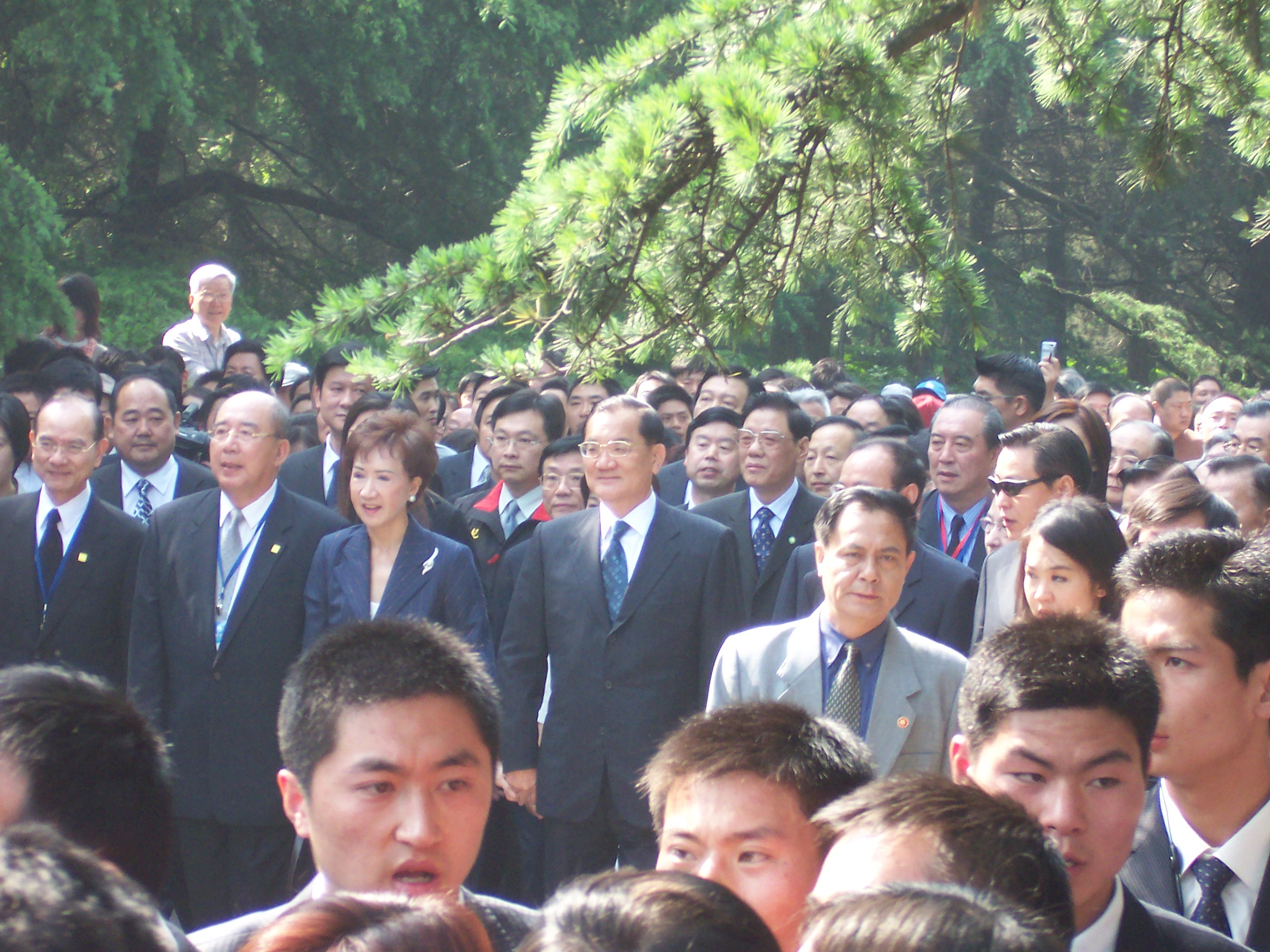
Wu and other Pan-Blue officials in Nanjing in 2005.

In April 2005, Wu joined Lien Chan and other Pan-Blue officials to visit mainland China.

=== 2009 China visit ===
In May 2009, Wu left for China for an eight-day visit. He was accompanied by three KMT vice chairmen, Lin Fong-cheng, Wu Den-yih (who doubled as KMT Secretary-General) and Chiang Hsiao-yen. Wang Yi, Director of the Taiwan Affairs Office, welcomed the delegations upon arrival in Beijing.

Prior to departure, Wu said that we would not mention the "Republic of China" if the Beijing government did not mention the "People's Republic of China" as well. If Beijing was to refrain from mentioning the One China principle, then he also would not talk about the 1992 Consensus.

The delegations visited several cities. In Beijing, they visited the Guangdong-Guangxi House, where Sun Yat-sen was elected as chairman of the Kuomintang in 1912. In Hangzhou, they visited the Manao Temple, where a museum of Lien Heng is located. In Nanjing, they visited the Sun Yat-sen Mausoleum. And in Chongqing, they attended the Taiwan Week celebration organized by Taiwanese businessmen doing business in China.

=== 2012 Beijing visit ===
Wu led a delegation from Taiwan to visit Beijing in March 2012 to meet Hu Jintao, the then-general secretary of the Chinese Communist Party (CCP); Wu proposed that cross-strait relations be governed under the framework of "one country, two areas" (一國兩區), in which from the Republic of China's point of view, ROC consists of Taiwan area and the mainland area.

Among the delegates are three of Kuomintang vice chairpersons, who are Lin Fong-cheng, Chiang Hsiao-yen and Hung Hsiu-chu.

=== Taiwanese branch of Bank of China ===
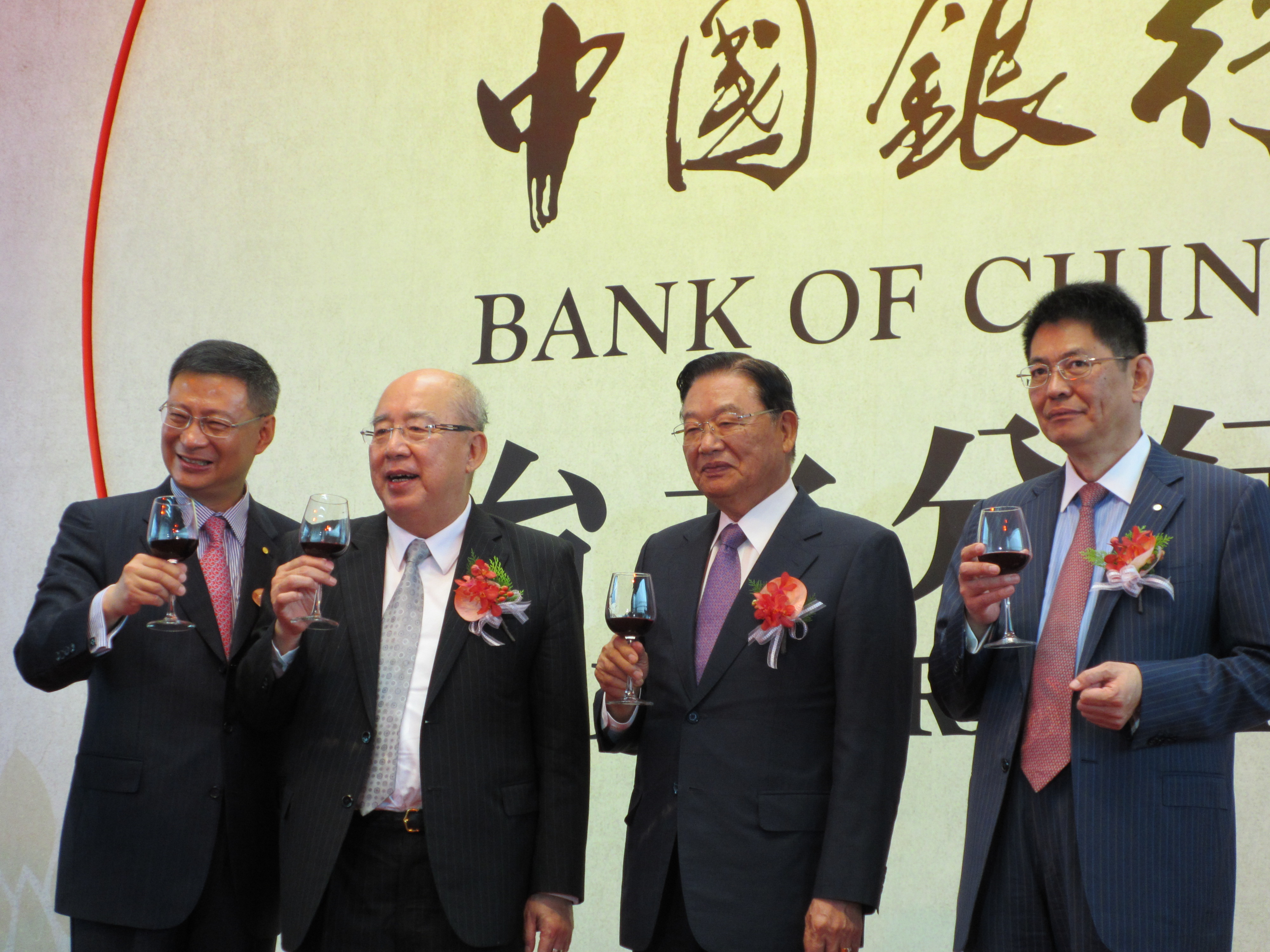
The opening ceremony of the first Taiwanese branch of Bank of China.

On 27 June 2012, Wu attended the opening ceremony of the first Taiwanese branch of the Bank of China. The ceremony was held in Taipei and Wu was accompanied by Straits Exchange Foundation chairman Chiang Pin-kung, Bank of China president Li Lihui and the bank's Taiwan branch general manager Tsai Rong-jun.

=== 2013 Beijing visit ===
Wu visited Beijing on 12–14 June 2013 to meet with Xi Jinping, General Secretary of the Communist Party, for the first time since Xi took office, accompanied by high ranking KMT officials, such as Chan Chun-po, Hung Hsiu-chu, Huang Min-hui and Su Chi. Accompanying Xi Jinping were Wang Huning, Li Zhanshu, Yang Jiechi and Zhang Zhijun from the CPC.

=== 2013 Yunnan CCP secretary visit ===
During a meeting between Wu and visiting Yunnan CCP committee secretary, Qin Guangrong, to Taiwan in mid September 2013, Wu said that Taiwan and mainland China should put aside political questions and disagreements to facilitate bilateral exchanges. He said that by showing patience, setting aside differences and focusing on economic cooperation and cultural exchanges, more common areas such as lifestyle and values would emerge.

During the meeting, Qin encouraged Taiwanese businessmen to invest in Yunnan and make use of the province as the gateway to Southeast Asia and South Asia, creating business opportunities. He added that Yunnan welcomes Taiwanese farmers, township wardens, teachers, students, media and religious and business representatives. Qin's delegation, which consisted of more than 200 people, participated in several activities while in Taiwan, such as promoting bilateral exchanges in education, culture, technology, tourism and civil aviation.

=== 2013 Nanjing visit ===
In October 2013, Wu traveled to Nanjing, Jiangsu to give a speech at the Xianlin campus of Nanjing University.

== Personal life ==
Outside of Taiwanese politics, Wu is a prominent and practicing Buddhist and plays an active role in the Fo Guang Shan Buddhist Order. Before he ascended to the KMT chairmanship, Wu served as the second worldwide president of the Buddha's Light International Association.

== See also ==
- Politics of the Republic of China
- History of the Republic of China

Government offices
Preceded by Hsu Shui-teh	Mayor of Taipei; 1988 - 1990	Succeeded by Huang Ta-chou
Party political offices
Preceded by Ma Ying-jeou	Chairman of the Kuomintang (acting); 2007	Succeeded by Chiang Pin-kung (acting)
Preceded by Chiang Pin-kung (acting)	Chairman of the Kuomintang; 2007 - 2009	Succeeded by Ma Ying-jeou
