= Wu Den-yih =

Taiwanese politician (born 1948)

- 吳敦義
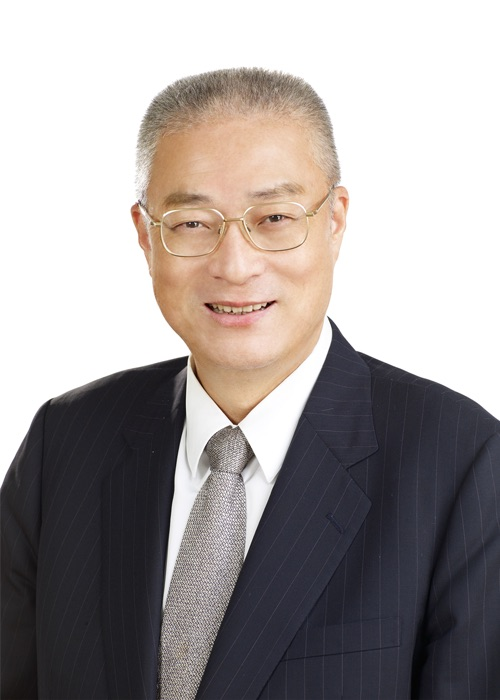
- Official portrait, 2012

9th Chairman of the Kuomintang
- In office 20 August 2017 – 15 January 2020
- Deputy: See list: Hau Lung-pin Tseng Yung-chuan
- Preceded by: Lin Junq-tzer (acting)
- Succeeded by: Lin Rong-te (acting)
- Acting; 3 December 2014 – 19 January 2015
- Deputy: See list: Hung Hsiu-chu Hau Lung-pin Huang Min-hui Jason Hu Eric Chu Tseng Yung-chuan
- Preceded by: Ma Ying-jeou
- Succeeded by: Eric Chu

10th Vice President of the Republic of China
- In office 20 May 2012 – 20 May 2016
- President: Ma Ying-jeou
- Preceded by: Siew Wan-chang
- Succeeded by: Chen Chien-jen

20th Premier of the Republic of China
- In office 10 September 2009 – 6 February 2012
- President: Ma Ying-jeou
- Vice Premier: Eric Chu; Sean Chen
- Preceded by: Liu Chao-shiuan
- Succeeded by: Sean Chen

16th Secretary-General of the Kuomintang
- In office 27 February 2007 – 17 October 2009
- Chairman: Wu Po-hsiung
- Deputy: Liao Feng-teh
- Preceded by: Chan Chun-po
- Succeeded by: Chan Chun-po

Member of the Legislative Yuan
- In office 1 February 2002 – 10 September 2009
- Preceded by: multi-member district
- Succeeded by: Ma Wen-chun
- Constituency: Nantou County

1st Mayor of Kaohsiung
- In office 15 December 1994 – 20 December 1998
- Deputy: Lin Join-sane
- Preceded by: Himself (as appointed mayor)
- Succeeded by: Frank Hsieh
- 3rd Appointed Mayor of Kaohsiung
- In office 18 June 1990 – 15 December 1994
- Appointed by: Executive Yuan
- Preceded by: Su Nan-cheng
- Succeeded by: Himself (as elected mayor)

6th Magistrate of Nantou
- In office 20 December 1981 – 20 December 1989
- Preceded by: Meng Fan-chao
- Succeeded by: Lin Yuan-lang

Member of the Taipei City Council
- In office 25 December 1973 – 20 December 1981

Personal details
- Born: 30 January 1948 (age 78) Caotun, Taichung County, Taiwan Province, Republic of China
- Party: Kuomintang
- Spouse: Tsai Ling-yi
- Children: 1
- Education: National Taiwan University (BA)

Chinese name
- Traditional Chinese: 吳敦義
- Simplified Chinese: 吴敦义
Transcriptions
Standard Mandarin
- Hanyu Pinyin: Wú Dūnyì
Southern Min
- Hokkien POJ: Gô͘ Tun-gī

Wu Den-yih (Chinese: 吳敦義; pinyin: Wú Dūnyì; born 30 January 1948) is a Taiwanese politician. He was Premier of the Republic of China from 2009 to 2012, Vice President of the Republic of China from 2012 to 2016, and Chairman of the Kuomintang from 2017 to 2020.

After graduating from National Taiwan University, Wu worked as a journalist and entered politics in 1973 with an appointment to the Taipei City Council. Wu was then elected Magistrate of Nantou County, serving from 1981 to 1989. Following two terms as magistrate, he was named Mayor of Kaohsiung in 1990. Wu remained mayor until 1998, having won the office in a 1994 direct election. He then served two full terms in the Legislative Yuan from 2002 to 2008.

Shortly after winning a third term in the legislature, Wu was named Premier of the Republic of China in 2009. He served until 2012, when he and Ma Ying-jeou formed the Kuomintang (KMT) presidential ticket. Wu served as the tenth vice president of the Republic of China, stepping down in 2016. In May 2017, he was elected party chairman. Wu stepped down from the position in January 2020. Previously, Wu had served the KMT as secretary-general from 2007 to 2009, first vice chairman in 2014, and as acting chairman in 2014 and 2015.

== Early life and education ==
Wu was born in 1948 in Caotun, Nantou County, Taiwan. His father, Wu Hsi (吳奚), served as the first general manager of the Nantou County Farmers' Association and as a member of the first Nantou County Council. Wu's family were farmers. Wu Hsi had also been the first standing director and general manager of the farmers' association of Taichung County. During the White Terror that followed the 228 Incident, Hsi was arrested and imprisoned for two years and nine months.

Wu graduated from Xinzhuang Elementary School in Caotun, and completed both junior and senior high school at Taichung First Senior High School. He then graduated from National Taiwan University with a bachelor's degree in history in 1970. As an undergraduate, he served as president of the student newspaper University News (大學新聞). While still a student, Wu wrote an article titled "The Cross of NTU Students" (臺大人的十字架) which won the appreciation of Chiang Ching-kuo, then director of the China Youth Corps, who summoned him to a meeting. Wu met Chiang in 1968 after opinion pieces he wrote during his sophomore year at NTU were published in prominent newspapers.

== Early career ==
After graduation, Wu became an instructor at the Republic of China Military Academy. From 1971 to 1973, he worked as a reporter and editorial writer for the China Times. As an editorial writer, he was responsible for a column on municipal affairs. In 1973, he was nominated by the Kuomintang to run for the Taipei City Council and won the election.

== Early political career ==
In 1973, at the age of 25, he was appointed to a position in the Taipei City Council, serving as the youngest member of the council. While in the office, he was resolute in upholding the view of working with high standard of integrity. For some corrupt officials, he asserted that bending the law is even worse than the corruption itself. He further added that although corruption violates the law, the law nevertheless survives. But if one publicly manipulates the law with impunity, the law dies. Wu worked for the council for eight years. During his time in the council, he also still worked as an editorial writer at China Times providing his opinions and thoughts on current political issues.

After serving the Taipei City Council, Wu made a successful campaign for the magistracy of Nantou County. He was elected to two terms, serving from 1981 to 1989.

He was named Mayor of Kaohsiung in 1990. Wu was directly elected to a second term in office, but lost reelection to Frank Hsieh in 1998. In 2001, Wu was elected to the Legislative Yuan for the first time, winning reelection twice thereafter, in 2004 and 2008.

== KMT Secretary-General ==
From 2007 to 2009, Wu was the secretary-general of the Kuomintang.

=== 2009 mainland China visit ===
In May 2009, Wu left for mainland China for an 8-day visit. He was accompanied by three senior KMT members, Wu Po-hsiung, Lin Fong-cheng and John Chiang. Wang Yi, Director of Taiwan Affairs Office welcomed the delegations upon arrival in Beijing.

The delegations visited several cities. In Beijing, they visited the Guangdong-Guangxi House, where Sun Yat-sen was elected as Chairperson of Kuomintang in 1912. In Hangzhou, they visited the Manao Temple, where a museum of Lian Heng is located. In Nanjing, they visited Sun Yat-sen Mausoleum. And in Chongqing, they attended the Taiwan Week celebration organized by Taiwanese businessmen doing business in mainland China.

== ROC Premiership ==
=== Premiership appointment ===
Wu was designated to succeed Liu Chao-shiuan as Premier of the Republic of China on 8 September 2009 by President Ma Ying-jeou. Liu and his Cabinet resigned en masse on 10 September to take responsibility for damage caused by Typhoon Morakot, with Wu succeeding the post the same day. Wu was appointed to the position due to his rich party and administrative experience. Wu spent his first night as Premier in Kaohsiung where he visited the Typhoon Morakot survivors at their temporary shelters in the Republic of China Military Academy in Fengshan District.

=== 2012 ROC Presidential Election ===
On 19 June 2011, Ma Ying-jeou announced that he and Wu would form the Kuomintang ticket for the 2012 presidential election, as incumbent Vice President Vincent Siew chose not to stand for reelection. Ma and Wu won the election with 51.6% of the vote, and took their respective offices on 20 May 2012.

=== 2012 Boao Forum for Asia ===
On 1–2 April 2012, ROC Vice President-elect Wu, in his capacity as the top advisor of the Cross-Straits Common Market Foundation, attended the 2012 Boao Forum for Asia in Haikou, Hainan. Wu represented Taiwan as "China's Taiwan" during the forum. In the forum, Wu met with PRC Vice Premier Li Keqiang in which both of them agreed to address various of cross-strait issues. While touring to a fruit farm during the forum period, Wu said that he will take care of the Chinese companies doing business in Taiwan. He added that he will make every effort in assisting any Chinese people who wish to invest in Taiwan.

== ROC Vice Presidency ==
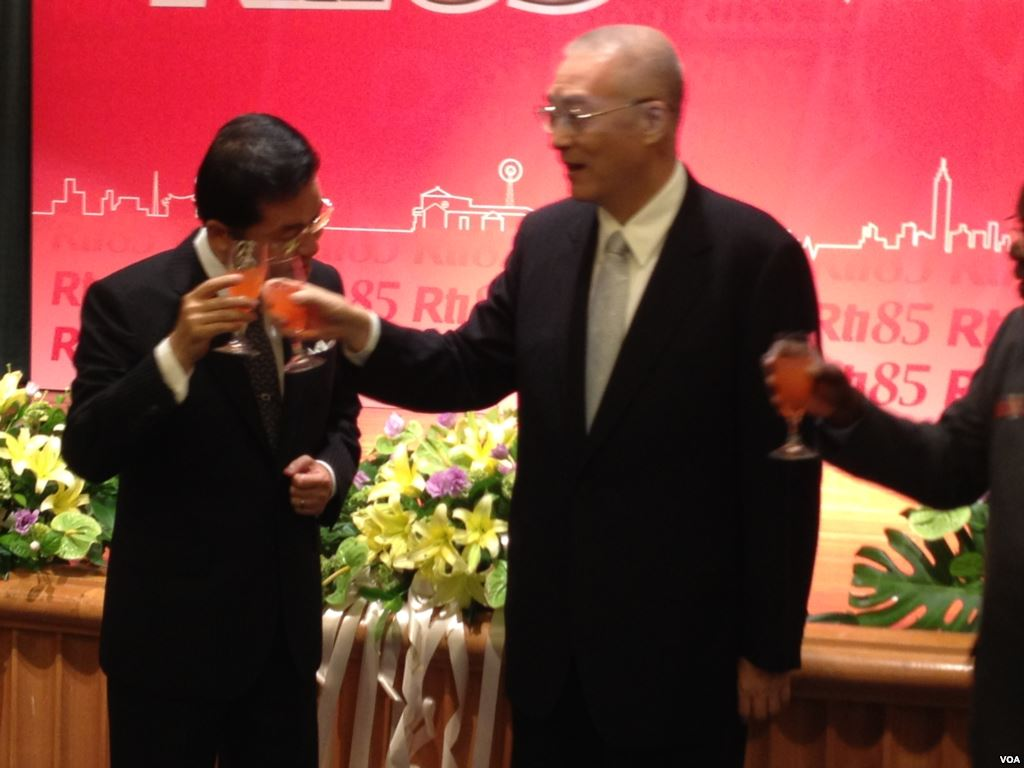
Vice President Wu at the 85th anniversary of Radio Taiwan International.

=== Taiwanese fisherman shooting incident ===
After the shooting incident of Taiwanese fisherman by Philippine government vessel on 9 May 2013 at the disputed water in South China Sea, speaking at a seminar in Longtan, Wu hoped that Taiwan and the Philippines can settle their maritime territorial dispute, and wished that all parties involved can work together to achieve the East China Sea peace initiative proposed by President Ma Ying-jeou in August 2012 to jointly explore and develop the resources in the sea area because this continuing dispute hinder the development of the sea resources.

== KMT Chairmanship ==
On 9 January 2017, Wu announced his candidacy for the 2017 KMT chairmanship election at the National Taiwan University Hospital International Convention Center in an event attended by former and current KMT legislators. He was the third person, after Hau Lung-pin and incumbent chairperson Hung Hsiu-chu, to announce his candidacy for the position. Wu won the election on 20 May, and received a congratulatory letter from Chinese Communist Party General Secretary Xi Jinping. Wu responded by emphasizing the 1992 Consensus and expressed his intention to create peace across the Taiwan Strait.

Following Han Kuo-yu's loss in the 2020 Taiwanese presidential election, Wu resigned from the Kuomintang chairmanship on 15 January 2020.

== Cross-strait relations ==
Speaking in October 2016, Wu said that both sides of the Taiwan Strait should engage in a healthy competition, build its society better and give more contribution for the building up of a strong and prosperous Chinese nation. He said that mainland China's ambition for unifying Taiwan under one country, two systems and Taiwan's ambition for independence or unification would destabilize cross-strait relations, stressing that peace is the best choice for both sides of the strait at the moment.

== Personal life ==
Wu is married to Tsai Ling-yi. They have three sons and one daughter.

== Awards and honors ==
Taiwan:

- Special Grand Cordon of the Order of Propitious Clouds (2012)
- Order of Chiang Chung-Cheng (2016)

Paraguay:

- National Order of Merit (2015)

Political offices
Preceded by Meng Fan-chao; Acting	Magistrate of Nantou; 1981–1989	Succeeded by Lin Yuan-lang
Preceded by Su Nan-cheng	Mayor of Kaohsiung; 1990–1998	Succeeded by Frank Hsieh
Preceded by Liu Chao-shiuan	Premier of the Republic of China; 2009–2012	Succeeded by Sean Chen
Preceded by Vincent Siew	Vice President of the Republic of China; 2012–2016	Succeeded by Chen Chien-jen
Party political offices
Preceded by Chan Chun-po	Secretary-General of the Kuomintang; 2007–2009	Succeeded by Chan Chun-po
Preceded by Ma Ying-jeou	Chairman of the Kuomintang; Acting; 2014–2015	Succeeded by Eric Chu
Preceded by Hung Hsiu-chu; Lin Junq-tzer acting	Chairman of the Kuomintang; 2017–2020	Succeeded by Lin Rong-te acting Johnny Chiang
