= Ting Yuan-chin =

- 丁原進
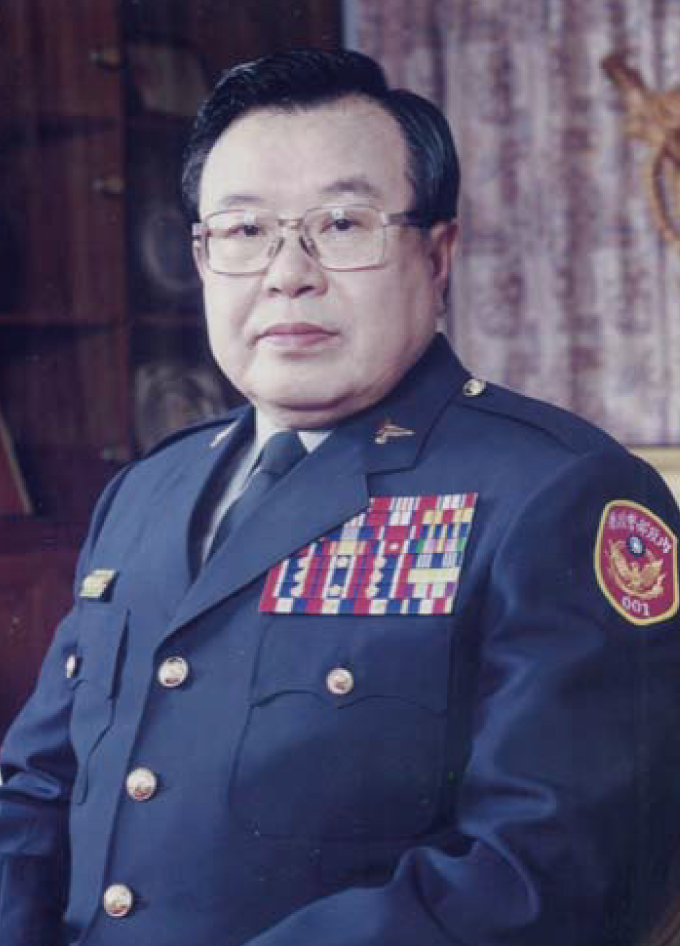

Director-General of the National Police Agency of the Republic of China
- In office September 1997 – 1 August 2000
- Preceded by: Yao Kao-chiao
- Succeeded by: Wang Ginn-wang

Personal details
- Born: 5 February 1939 Rizhao, Shandong, Republic of China
- Died: 29 April 2009 (aged 70) Qingdao, Shandong, People's Republic of China
- Education: Central Police University (BA)

Ting Yuan-chin (Chinese: 丁原進; pinyin: Dīng Yuánjìn; 5 February 1939 – 29 April 2009) was a Taiwanese police officer.

== Life ==
Ting was raised in Rizhao, Shandong, and graduated from what became Central Police University. Ting was successively assigned to the Hsinchu County, Yilan County, and Miaoli County police departments, and held administrative posts within the National Police Agency prior to his promotion to chief of the Taipei City Police Department in 1996 while Chen Shui-bian was mayor. Appointed director-general of the National Police Agency after Yao Kao-chiao stepped down in the aftermath of the murder of Pai Hsiao-yen, Ting assumed the role in September 1997, and faced the Alexander family hostage crisis in November 1997. In January 2000, Ting participated in discussions that led to the formation of an "action initiative" against black gold politics. Ting was considered a likely candidate as interior minister, as Chen had stated during his 2000 presidential campaign that he would like to retain Ting, and that he preferred the position to be filled by a police officer. Chang Po-ya became interior minister, and Ting remained director-general of the National Police Agency. After four construction workers died in a flash flood caught on live television broadcast at Pachang Creek on 22 July 2000, Ting was one of thirteen officials to be given a demerit. Ting submitted his resignation from the National Police Agency on 25 July 2000. It was reviewed by premier Tang Fei the same day, and took effect on 1 August 2000. Ting was replaced by Wang Ginn-wang.

In 1999, Ting acquired the fourteenth and fifteenth floors of a luxury apartment in the Muzha area of Wenshan District. Taipei City Councilors Lee Ching-yuan and Chung Hsiao-ping alleged in July 2001 that Ting bought the property for below market value and owed NT$16 million in taxes. The Control Yuan investigated Ting and subsequently impeached him in December 2001. Interior designer Ko Wen-cheng filed a lawsuit against Ting's son Chao-chi, claiming more than NT$4 million in unpaid fees for work completed on the property. Ting Yuan-chin retained the property for some time after legal action had begun. After retiring from police work, Ting Yuan-chin became a consultant to a telecommunications company. He died of a heart attack at a hospital in Qingdao, Shandong, on 29 April 2009, aged 70. Ding's remains were returned to Taiwan in May 2009, and placed at the Zion Park Memorial Hall in Xinyi District, Taipei.
