= Yao Kao-chiao =

Taiwanese politician and former police

Yao Kao-chiao MLY
- 姚高橋

Member of the Legislative Yuan
- In office 25 October 2001 – 31 January 2002
- Preceded by: Tseng Chen-nung

Minister of the Coast Guard Administration
- In office 1 February 2000 – 19 May 2000
- Preceded by: Office established
- Succeeded by: Wang Chun

Director-General of the National Police Agency of the Republic of China
- In office 13 June 1996 – August 1997
- Preceded by: Yen Shih-hsi
- Succeeded by: Ting Yuan-chin

President of Central Police University
- In office May 1995 – June 1996
- Preceded by: Yen Shih-hsi
- Succeeded by: Chen Bi

Personal details
- Born: 1940 (age 85–86) Zhunan, Miaoli County, Taiwan
- Party: Kuomintang (until 2002)
- Education: Central Police University (LLB); Meiji University (LLM)

Yao Kao-chiao (Chinese: 姚高橋; pinyin: Yáo Gāoqiáo; born c. 1940) is a Taiwanese lawyer, politician, and former police officer.

== Early life and education ==
Yao was the youngest of five sons, born in the village of Gongyi in Zhunan, Miaoli County. He later moved to Taipei. Yao studied law at what became Central Police University and later completed a master's degree in the subject from Meiji University.

== Career ==
He served five years as leader of the Kaohsiung City Police Department and four years with the Taipei County Police Department. Between 1995 and 1996, Yao was president of Central Police University. Within the National Police Agency, Yao was deputy director-general prior to his appointment as director-general from his post at Central Police University. His tenure as director-general began on 13 June 1996, as he succeeded Yen Shih-hsi. During Yao's leadership of the National Police Agency, the agency attempted unsuccessfully to track Hsiao Teng-piao. Additionally, several violent crimes occurred, among them the assassinations of Liu Pang-yu and Peng Wan-ru, both in November 1996. Soon after, Yao remarked that he would never allow his daughter to take a taxi alone at night. Following the April 1997 murder of Pai Hsiao-yen, Yao stepped down from the National Police Agency in August.

In January 2000, Yao was appointed the inaugural minister of the Coast Guard Administration. In this position, he warned against implementation of the three small links, stating that China's intelligence agents and gangsters might use them to infiltrate Taiwan. Yao drew criticism for missing a meeting of the Legislative Yuan in April 2000, despite the fact that he had applied for leave and had gone to Kinmen to discuss borrowing patrol boats from the Republic of China Armed Forces.

After stepping down from the Coast Guard Administration as the Chen Shui-bian presidential administration took office, Yao worked for the National Policy Foundation, a think tank affiliated with the Kuomintang. The party nominated him as a Kaohsiung-based candidate for the Legislative Yuan in 2001, but he was not elected. Instead, Yao took office on 25 October 2001, succeeding Tseng Chen-nung on the party list compiled for proportional representation. He was one of three candidates contesting the Kuomintang nomination for the 2002 Kaohsiung mayoral election. The Kuomintang's deliberations with the People First Party took two months, after which Huang Jun-ying was named the Pan-Blue Coalition's joint candidate for Kaohsiung. Days before the election in December 2002, Yao stated that he would support incumbent Frank Hsieh of the Democratic Progressive Party. The declaration resulted in Yao's expulsion from the Kuomintang shortly after the election took place. In March 2003, after Hsieh began his second mayoral term, he appointed Yao deputy mayor. As deputy mayor, Yao led many cultural events. In October 2004, Yao met Kim Young-sam during Kim's fourth visit to Taiwan.

During the 2018 local elections, Yao backed the mayoral bids of Hou You-yi in New Taipei, and Han Kuo-yu in Kaohsiung.
