= Tongpan Island =

Island west of Taiwan

Native name: 桶盤嶼
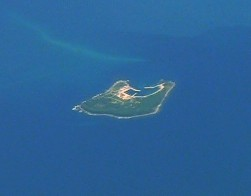
- Tongpan Island

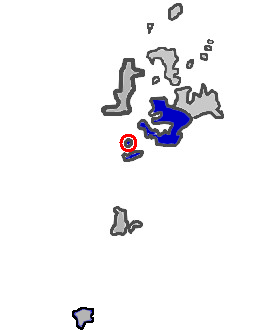
- Tongpan Island in Magong City, Penghu County

Geography
- Location: southern Magong City, Penghu County (the Pescadores), Republic of China (Taiwan)
- Coordinates: 23.511072°N 119.518289°E
- Area: 0.3439 km^{2} (0.1328 sq mi)

Administration
- Republic of China (Taiwan)
- Province: Taiwan (streamlined)
- County: Penghu
- County-administered city: Magong

Demographics
- Population: 378 (2018)

Additional information
- Time zone: National Standard Time (UTC+8)

Location of Tongpan Island

Tongpan Island (Chinese: 桶盤嶼; pinyin: Tǒngpán Yǔ; Pe̍h-ōe-jī: Tháng-pôaⁿ-sū) is an island in Tongpan Village (桶盤里), Magong City, Penghu County (the Pescadores), Taiwan. Tongpan Island is about 6 nmi (11 km) from the main island of Penghu. A ferry runs between Tongpan Island and Penghu Main Island twice a day and more often at some times. The island is a basalt mesa landform with a shoreline of cliffs made of basalt columns. These geological formations make it "The Yellowstone Park of the Penghu". The columns can be seen in a path around the island. The southwest side of the island has a stepped basin known as "Lotus Terrace" (蓮花臺). There is a beehive-shaped basalt formation on the island called "Cat Rock" (貓公石). There are coral reefs on the nearby seabed which can be seen by snorkelling.

The village is known for the ornate Fuhai Temple (福海宮), a Taoist temple which attracts worshippers who live off the island. The temple is dedicated to Wang Ye worship (Wen Fu Wang Ye (溫府王爺)) and was built in 1896/1906 and renovated in 1934 and 1982. On the 3rd day of the 3rd month of the Chinese lunar calendar, the birthday of Xuanwu (god) ("Dark (or Mysterious) Heavenly Highest Deity" (玄天上帝; Xuántiān Shàngdì)) is celebrated and 300 to 400 persons who have family on the island return for the ceremonies.

On July 12, 1683, Qing Empire naval forces took Hujing Island and Tongpan Island in the early stages of the Battle of Penghu.

On the afternoon of July 20, 2002, Vice President Annette Lu visited Tongpan Island where she took note of freshwater supply issues, visited the art village's museum, and offered incense at Fuhai Temple.

In January 2008, the Tongpan Geology Park (桶盤嶼玄武岩地質公園) was established focused around the basalt columns of the island.

Starting from September 26, 2019, the seawater desalination plant on Tongpan Island was out of operation for several weeks.

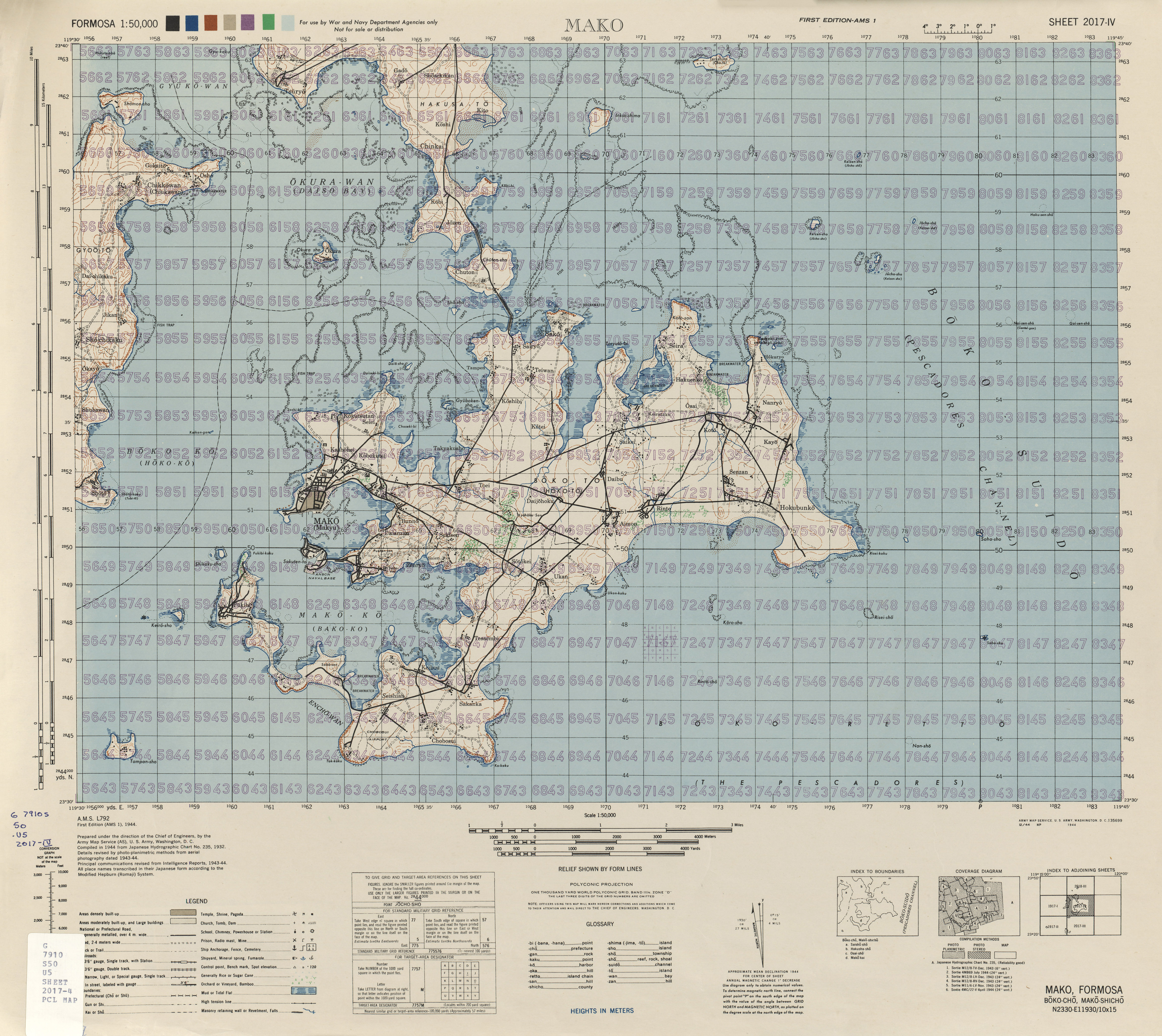
Map including Tongpan Island (labeled as Tampan-sho) (1944)

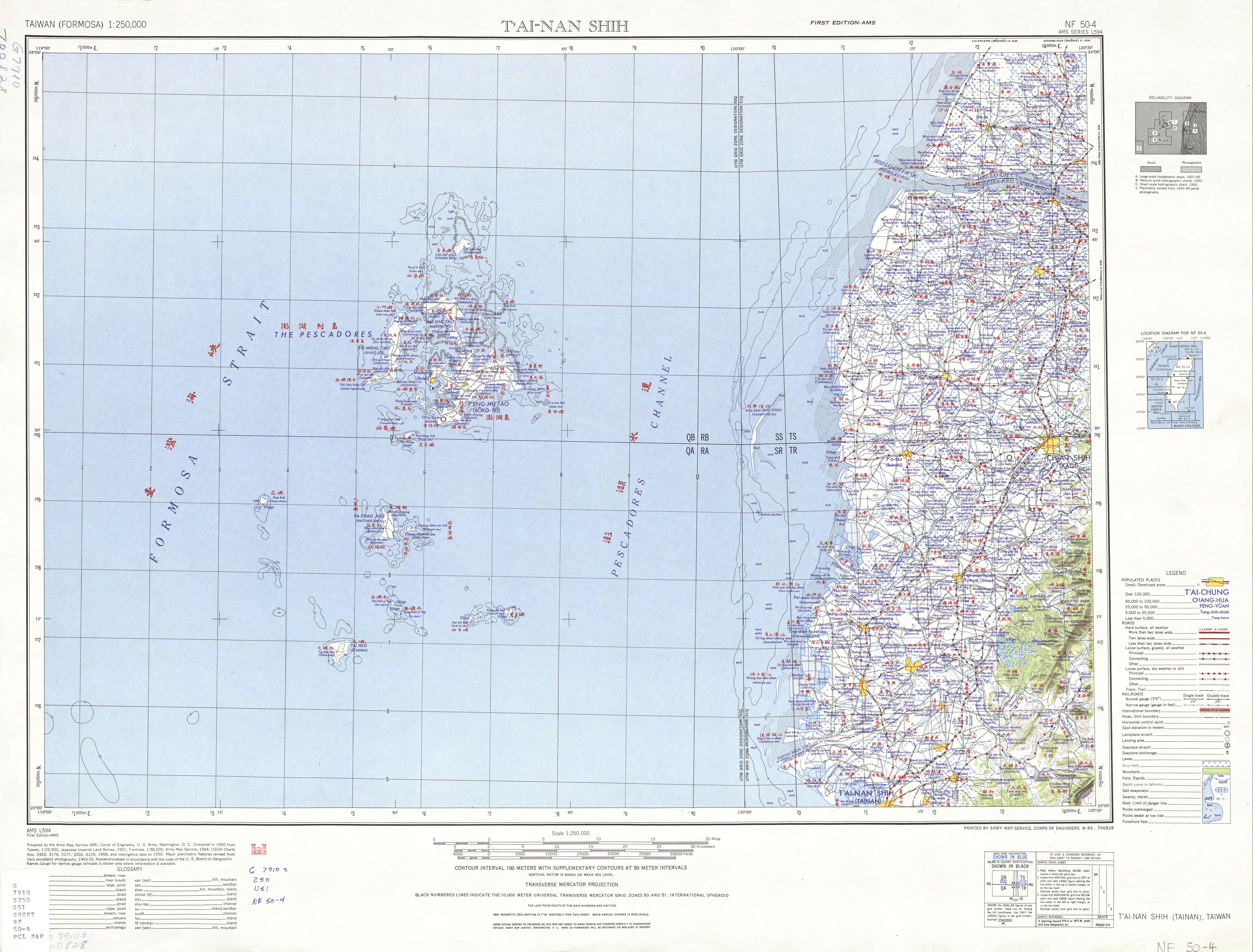
Map including Tongpan Island (labeled as T’ung-p’an hsü (Tampan-sho) 桶盤嶼) (1950)

== Gallery ==
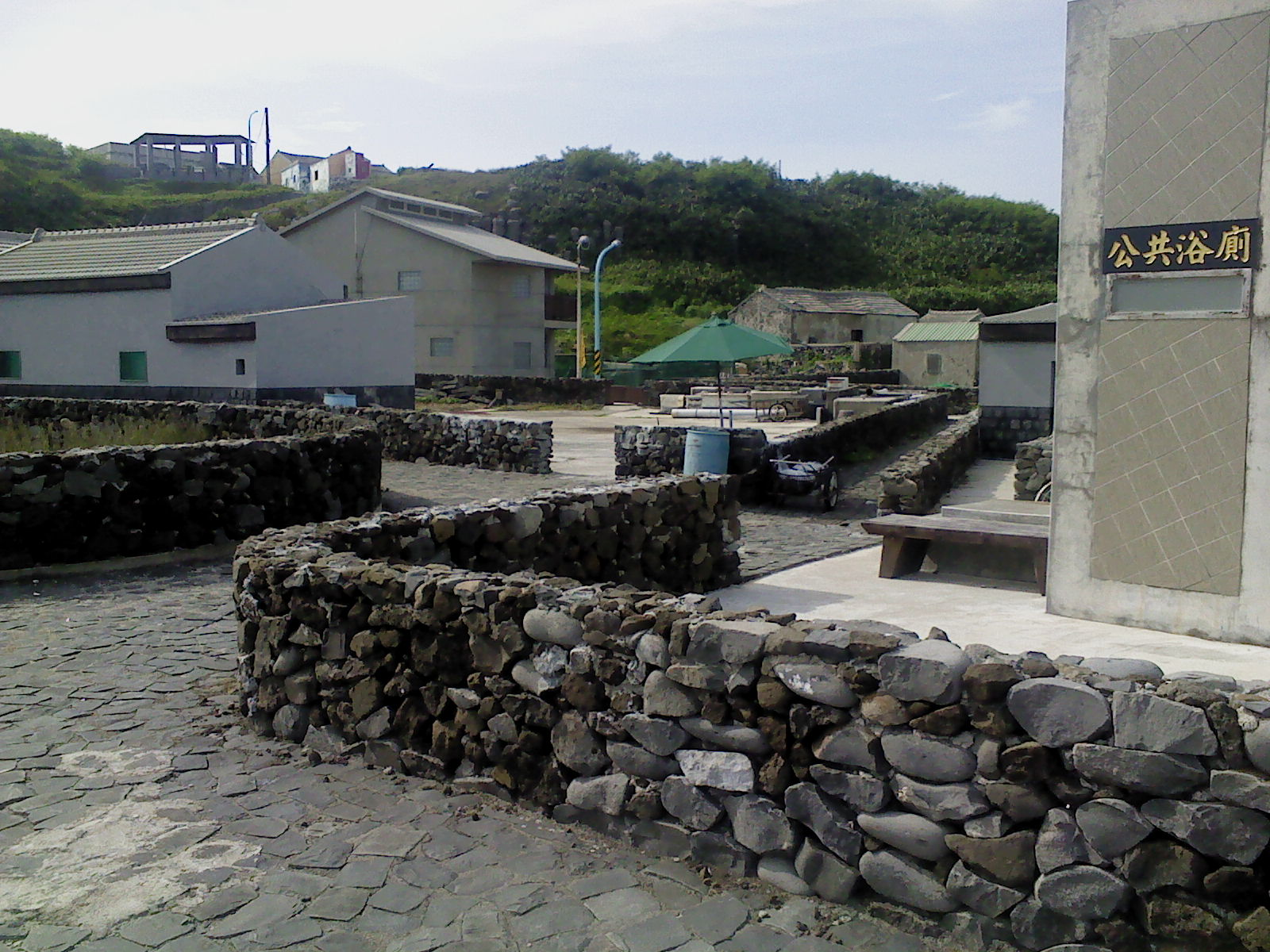
Caizhai Block

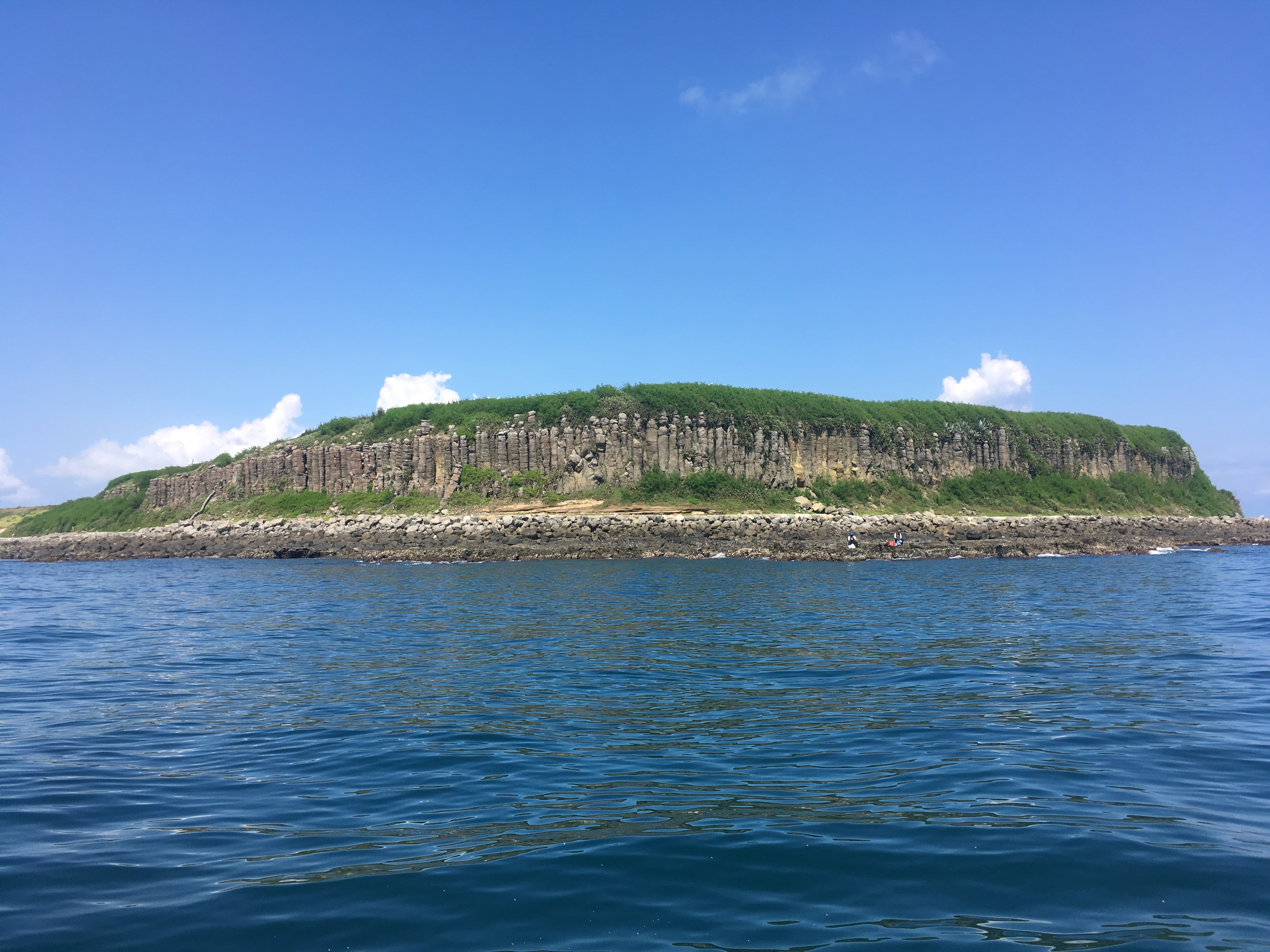
Basalt columns

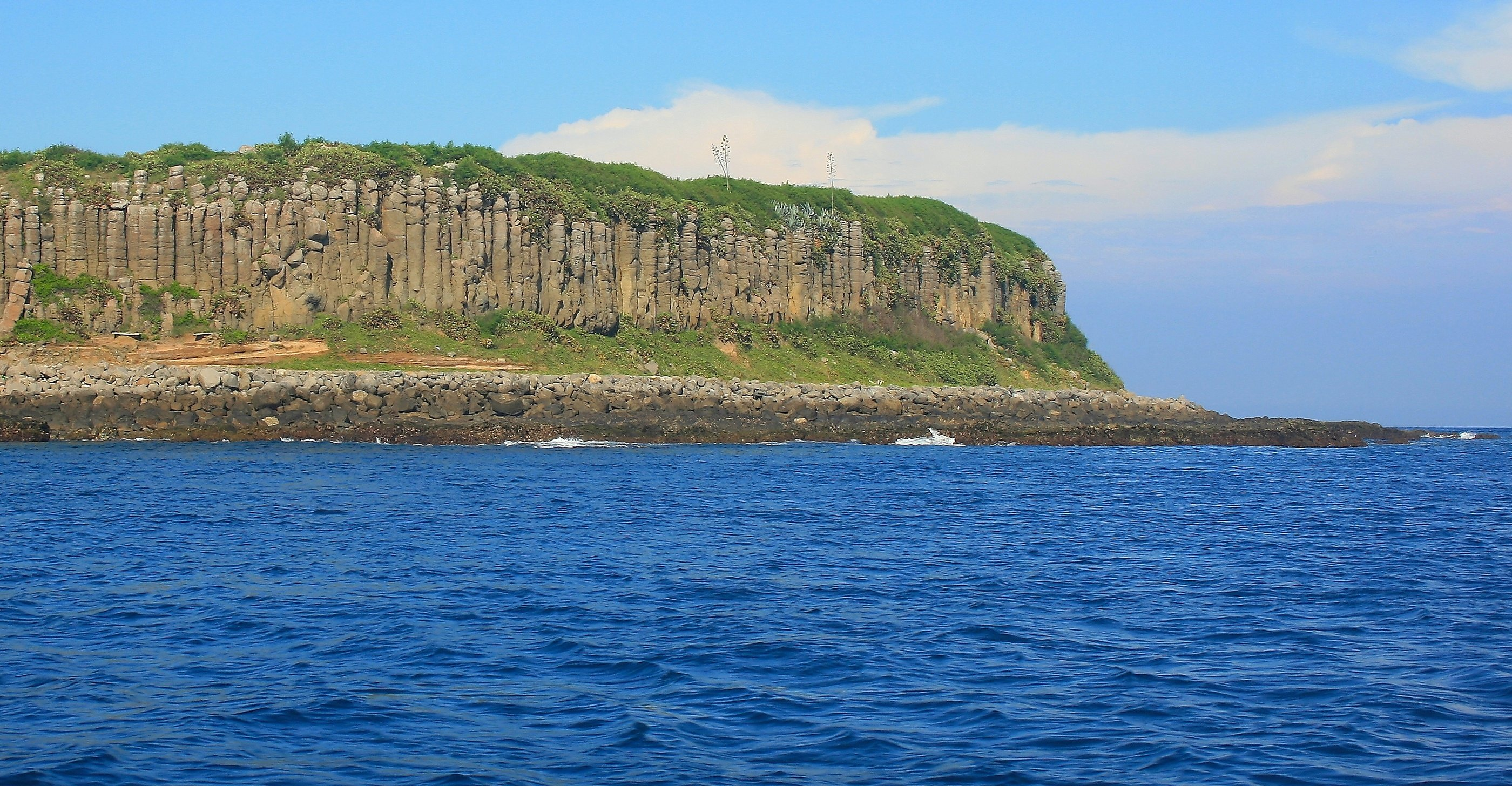
Basalt columns

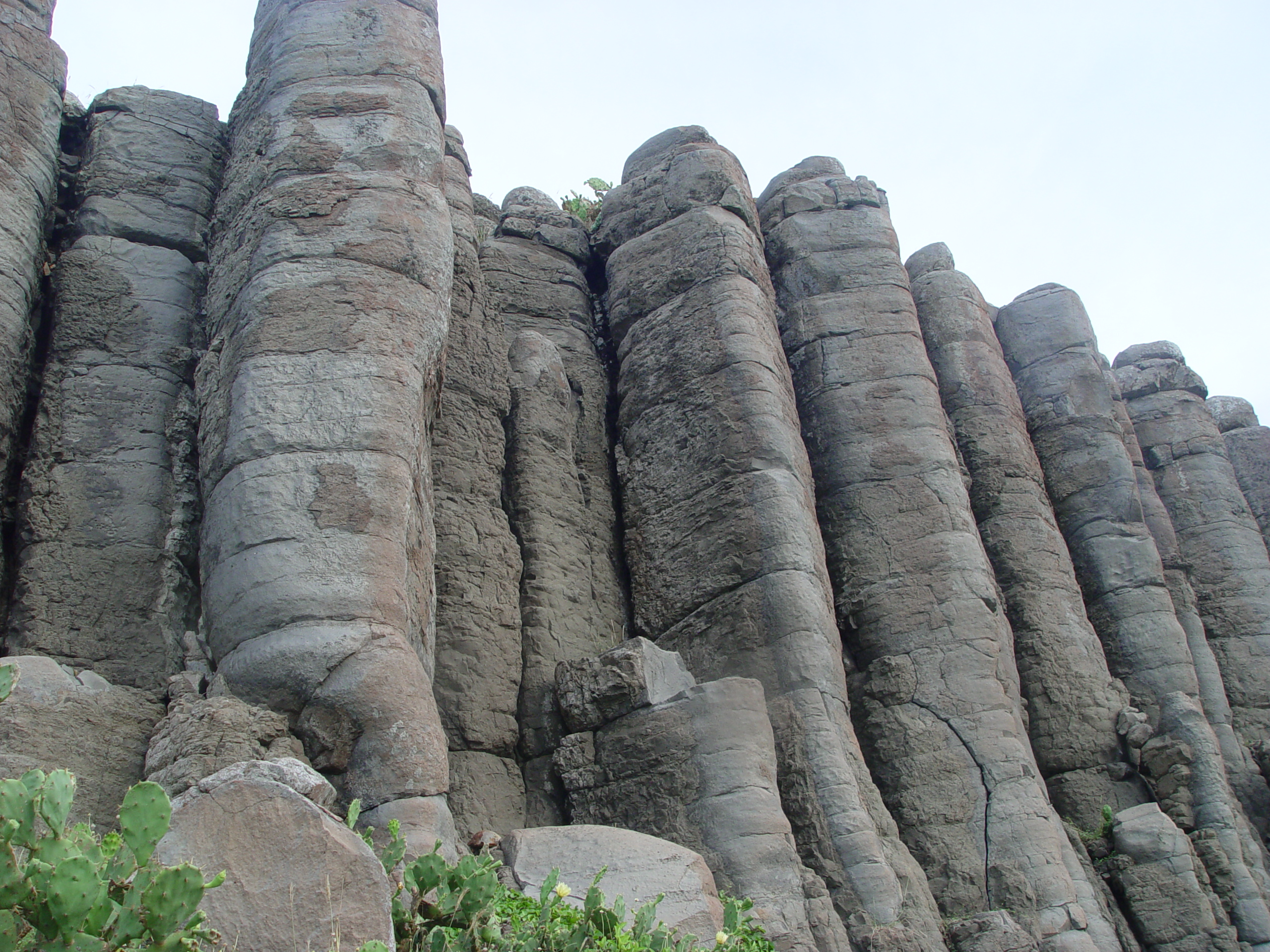
Basalt columns

== See also ==
- List of islands of Taiwan
