= Formosa Alliance =

Formosa Alliance 喜樂島聯盟
- Chairman: Lo Jen-kuei
- Secretary-General: Kuo Pei-hung
- Vice chairman: Shih Cheng-feng
- Founded: 7 April 2018; 6 years ago
- Headquarters: Taipei, Taiwan
- Ideology: Populism; Taiwan independence Taiwanese nationalism Taiwanization
- Colours: Teal
- Legislative Yuan: 0 / 113
- Municipal Mayoralties: 0 / 6
- City Mayoralties and County Magistracies: 0 / 16
- Local Councillors: 0 / 912
- Township Chiefs: 0 / 204

Website
- www.formosaparty.org

The Formosa Alliance (Chinese: 喜樂島聯盟; pinyin: Xǐlè Dǎo Liánméng; Pe̍h-ōe-jī: Hí-lo̍k-tó Liân-bêng) is a political coalition founded in Taiwan on 7 April 2018. The organization reformed as a political party on 20 July 2019.

== Goals ==
The Formosa Alliance was established on 7 April 2018. Its founding leader was Kuo Pei-hung, at the time also chairman of Formosa Television. Other members included Chen Shui-bian, Huang Kuo-chang, Lee Teng-hui, Yu Shyi-kun, and the Taiwan Solidarity Union, as well as several overseas Taiwanese organizations. The organization intended to hold a referendum on independence on 6 April 2019, though this did not occur. Other goals included advocating a change in the island's name from the Republic of China to Taiwan, and to apply for membership in the United Nations. The alliance's first full meeting was held on 16 June 2018.

In April 2019, the Formosa Alliance announced a split between it and the Democratic Progressive Party, as well as a new color scheme emphasizing turquoise, a representation of the land of Taiwan and the ocean. The alliance rebranded as a political party, and expanded its platform. Alongside support for the independence referendum and admittance to the United Nations, the Formosa Alliance sought to draft a new constitution, introduce a new national anthem, adopt a new flag, and normalize diplomatic relations with other nations. Compared with the Democratic Progressive Party, from which it split, the Formosa Alliance is more socially conservative. On 20 July 2019, the Formosa Alliance was reconstituted as a political party, with Presbyterian Church in Taiwan minister Lo Jen-kuei as its first chairman. Lo named Shih Cheng-feng as the party's deputy chairman. Party officials stated that it would not nominate a candidate to contest the 2020 Taiwan presidential election, but that it would field ten candidates in the concurrent 2020 Taiwan legislative election.

On 10 September 2019, Formosa Alliance executive committee member Ou Chong-jing stated that he would obtain registration forms for the 2020 presidential election from the Central Election Commission. Ou told Taiwan News that the Formosa Alliance had planned to back his legislative campaign in New Taipei, but subsequently announced that a presidential candidate would be named without a primary. Ou then acquired the petition required of independent presidential candidacies, without the party's support, though he stated that he would wait until the deadline to register presidential bids, 17 September 2019, for the Formosa Alliance's decision. On 17 September 2019, Annette Lu announced that she and Peng Pai-hsien, via petition, would form the Formosa Alliance ticket for the presidential election, though Lu remained a member of the Democratic Progressive Party. Lu and Peng ended their campaign on 2 November 2019.
