= Mayor of Taoyuan =

Taiwanese mayorship

Mayor of the City of Taoyuan
- Flag of Taoyuan

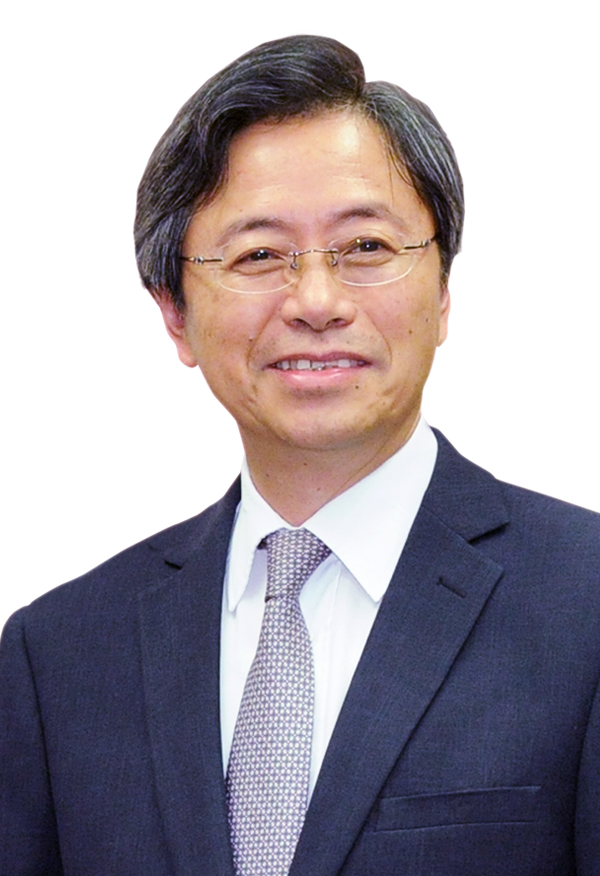
- Incumbent; Chang San-cheng since 25 December 2022
- Term length: four years; may serve 1 consecutive terms
- Website: www.tycg.gov.tw

The Mayor of Taoyuan is the chief executive of the Taoyuan City Government. Taoyuan City is a special municipality of the Republic of China (Taiwan). It was formerly known as the magistrate of Taoyuan before 25 December 2014 when Taoyuan was still a county. This list includes directly elected magistrates of the county during that time period.

== Titles of the Mayor ==
Date	English	Characters	Mandarin	Taiwanese	Hakka
Oct 1950–Dec 2014	Magistrate of Taoyuan	桃園縣縣長	Táoyuán Xiàn Xiànzhǎng	Thô-hn̂g-koān Koān-tiúⁿ	Thò-yèn-yen Yen-chhòng
Dec 2014–present	Mayor of Taoyuan	桃園市市長	Táoyuán Shì Shìzhǎng	Thô-hn̂g-chhī Chhī-tiúⁿ	Thò-yèn-sṳ Sṳ-chhòng

== List of Mayors ==
=== Magistrates of Taoyuan County ===
Kuomintang Independent Democratic Progressive Party

№	Portrait	Name (Birth–Death)	Term of Office		Political Party	Term
1		Hsu Chung-teh 徐崇德; Xú Chóngdé (Mandarin); Chhì Chhùng-tet (Hakka) (1900–1985)	1 May 1951	2 June 1954	Kuomintang	1
1		Hsu Chung-teh 徐崇德; Xú Chóngdé (Mandarin); Chhì Chhùng-tet (Hakka) (1900–1985)	2 June 1954	2 June 1957	Kuomintang	2
2		Chang Fang-hsieh 張芳燮; Zhāng Fāngxiè (Mandarin); Chông Fông-siet (Hakka) (1914–1994)	2 June 1957	2 June 1960	Kuomintang	3
3		Wu Hung-ling 吳鴻麟; Wú Hónglín (Mandarin); Ǹg Fùng-lîn (Hakka) (1899–1995)	2 June 1960	2 June 1964 (Note: Term extended to 4 years.)	Kuomintang	4
4		Chen Chang-shou 陳長壽; Chén Chángshòu (Mandarin); Chhṳ̀n Chhòng-su (Hakka) (1905–1977)	2 June 1964	2 June 1968	Kuomintang	5
5		Hsu Hsin-chih 許新枝; Xǔ Xīnzhī (Mandarin); Hí Sîn-kî (Hakka) (1928–)	2 June 1968	2 June 1972 (Note: Left office to serve as Taiwan Province Civil Affairs Department Commissioner.)	Kuomintang	6
–		Lee Shu-yu (Note: As acting; provincial council member.) 李樹猶; Lǐ Shùyóu (Mandarin); Lí Su-yù (Hakka) (1916–2003)	2 June 1972	1 February 1973 (Note: Term extended to accommodate joint elections.)	Kuomintang	6
6		Wu Po-hsiung (Note: Son of Wu Hung-ling.) 吳伯雄; Wú Bóxióng (Mandarin); Ǹg Pak-hiùng (Hakka) (1939–)	1 February 1973	20 December 1976 (Note: Left office to head the Taiwan Tobacco and Wine Monopoly Bureau.)	Kuomintang	7
–		Weng Chien 翁鈐; Wēng Qián (Mandarin); Vûng Khiàm (Hakka) (1917–1997)	20 December 1976	20 December 1977	Kuomintang	7
7		Hsu Hsin-liang 許信良; Xǔ Xìnliáng (Mandarin); Hí Sin-liòng (Hakka) (1941–)	20 December 1977	1 July 1979 (Note: Removed from office.)	Independent	8
–		Yeh Kuo-kuang 葉國光; Yè Guóguāng (Mandarin); Ya̍p Koet-kông (Hakka) (1923–)	1 July 1979	20 December 1981	Kuomintang	8
8		Hsu Hung-chih 徐鴻志; Xú Hóngzhì (Mandarin); Chhì Fùng-chṳ (Hakka) (1937–2018)	20 December 1981	20 December 1985	Kuomintang	9
8		Hsu Hung-chih 徐鴻志; Xú Hóngzhì (Mandarin); Chhì Fùng-chṳ (Hakka) (1937–2018)	20 December 1985	20 December 1989	Kuomintang	10
9		Liu Pang-yu 劉邦友; Liú Bāngyǒu (Mandarin); Liù Pâng-yû (Hakka) (1942–1996)	20 December 1989	20 December 1993	Kuomintang	11
9		Liu Pang-yu 劉邦友; Liú Bāngyǒu (Mandarin); Liù Pâng-yû (Hakka) (1942–1996)	20 December 1993	21 November 1996 (Note: Assassinated.)	Kuomintang	12
–		Liao Pen-yang 廖本洋; Liào Běnyáng (Mandarin); Liau Pún-yòng (Hakka) (?–)	21 November 1996	28 March 1997	Kuomintang	12
10		Annette Lu (Note: Elected in by-election. First woman and DPP Magistrate of Taoyuan.) 呂秀蓮; Lǚ Xiùlián (Mandarin); Lî Siu-lièn (Hakka) (1944–)	28 March 1997	20 December 1997	Democratic Progressive Party	12
10		Annette Lu 呂秀蓮; Lǚ Xiùlián (Mandarin); Lî Siu-lièn (Hakka) (1944–)	20 December 1997	20 May 2000 (Note: Resigned before inauguration as vice president of the Republic of China.)	Democratic Progressive Party	13
–		Hsu Ying-shen (Note: Nephew of Hsu Hsin-liang.) (Note: Designated by Executive Yuan as acting.) 許應深; Xǔ Yìngshēn (Mandarin); Hí En-chhṳ̂m (Hakka) (1948–)	20 May 2000	20 December 2001	Democratic Progressive Party	13
11		Eric Chu 朱立倫; Zhū Lìlún (Mandarin); Chû Li̍p-lùn (Hakka) (1961–)	20 December 2001	20 December 2005	Kuomintang	14
11		Eric Chu 朱立倫; Zhū Lìlún (Mandarin); Chû Li̍p-lùn (Hakka) (1961–)	20 December 2005	10 September 2009 (Note: Resigned to become the vice premier of the Republic of China.)	Kuomintang	15
–		Huang Min-kon (Note: As acting; deputy magistrate.) 黃敏恭; Huáng Mǐngōng (Mandarin); Vòng Men-kiûng (Hakka) (1947–)	10 September 2009	20 December 2009	Kuomintang	15
12		John Wu (Note: Son of Wu Po-hsiung.) 吳志揚; Wú Zhìyáng (Mandarin); Ǹg Chṳ-yòng (Hakka) (1969–)	20 December 2009	25 December 2014 (Note: Last Magistrate of Taoyuan. Lost in the first mayor election.)	Kuomintang	16

=== Mayors of Taoyuan City (special municipality) ===
№	Portrait	Name (Birth–Death)	Term of Office		Political Party	Term
1		Cheng Wen-tsan 鄭文燦; Zhèng Wéncàn (Mandarin); Chhiáng Vùn-chhan (Hakka) (1967–)	25 December 2014	25 December 2018	Democratic Progressive Party	1
1		Cheng Wen-tsan 鄭文燦; Zhèng Wéncàn (Mandarin); Chhiáng Vùn-chhan (Hakka) (1967–)	25 December 2018	25 December 2022	Democratic Progressive Party	2
2		Chang San-cheng 張善政; Zhāng Shànzhèng (Mandarin) (1954–)	25 December 2022	Incumbent	Kuomintang	3

== See also ==
- Taoyuan City Government
- Taoyuan Aerotropolis
