= Hujing Island =

Island west of Taiwan

Native name: 虎井嶼 (Chinese)
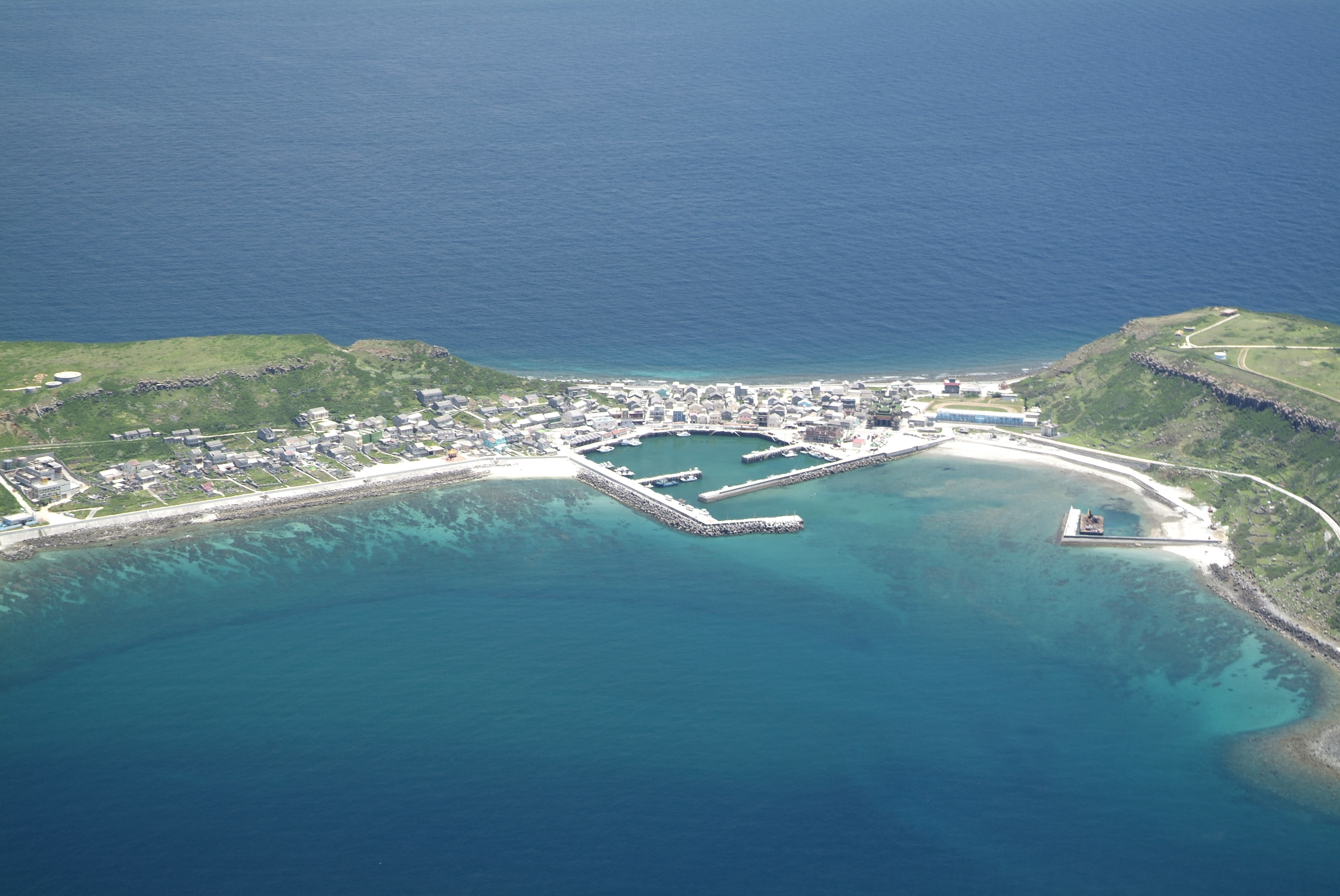
- Hujing Island

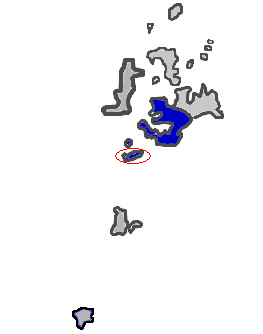
- Hujing Island in Magong City, Penghu County

Geography
- Location: southwestern Magong City, Penghu County (the Pescadores), Republic of China (Taiwan)
- Coordinates: 23.489747°N 119.526358°E
- Area: 1.9972 km^{2} (0.7711 sq mi)

Administration
- Republic of China (Taiwan)
- Province: Taiwan (streamlined)
- County: Penghu
- County-administered city: Magong

Demographics
- Population: ~100 (2017)

Additional information
- Time zone: National Standard Time (UTC+8)

Location of Hujing Island

Hujing Island / Huching Island / Hujing Islet (Chinese: 虎井嶼; pinyin: Hǔjǐng Yǔ; Wade–Giles: Hu^{3}-ching^{3} Yü^{3}; Pe̍h-ōe-jī: Hó͘-chéⁿ-sū) is an islet in Hujing Village (虎井里), Magong City, Penghu County (the Pescadores), Taiwan. The island has also been known as Da'anshan (大案山) and the nearby Tongpan Island as Xiao'anshan (小案山). The southern part of the island is crossed by the Tropic of Cancer. Hujing Island is the seventh largest island in Penghu (the Pescadores). The island is 7 nmi (13 km) from Penghu Main Island. There are mountains on the eastern end (Dongshan) and western end (Sishan) of the island.

Ferries run three times a day between Magong on the main island of Penghu and Hujing Island. It takes about twenty minutes to reach Hujing Island from Penghu's main island by boat.

== History ==
The island takes its current name from a tradition in which a tiger was found in a dry cave (or well) near the south end of the island.

According to tradition, the Dutch built a fortress on the island which sank into the sea. No significant discoveries have been made in the area.

On July 12, 1683, Qing Empire naval forces took Hujing Island and Tongpan Island in the early stages of the Battle of Penghu.

A World War II-era Japanese bomb shelter built on the island survives and is accessible to the public free of charge.

In January 2019, there were noted complaints about collapsing roads and slow repair times around the western mountain area of the island.

In June 2019, there were a total of six students in the island's primary school.

== Geography ==
The population of Hujing (Huching) village, noted for its seafood restaurants, is concentrated on the southwest end of the island.

The island's geology is noted for black volcanic rock formations. The island is higher in altitude than nearby Tongpan Island with a plain between the mountainous areas where most of the population lives.

== Gallery ==
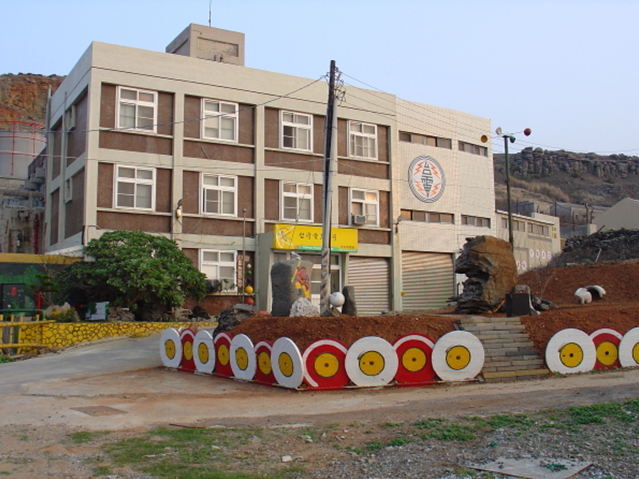
Power Station

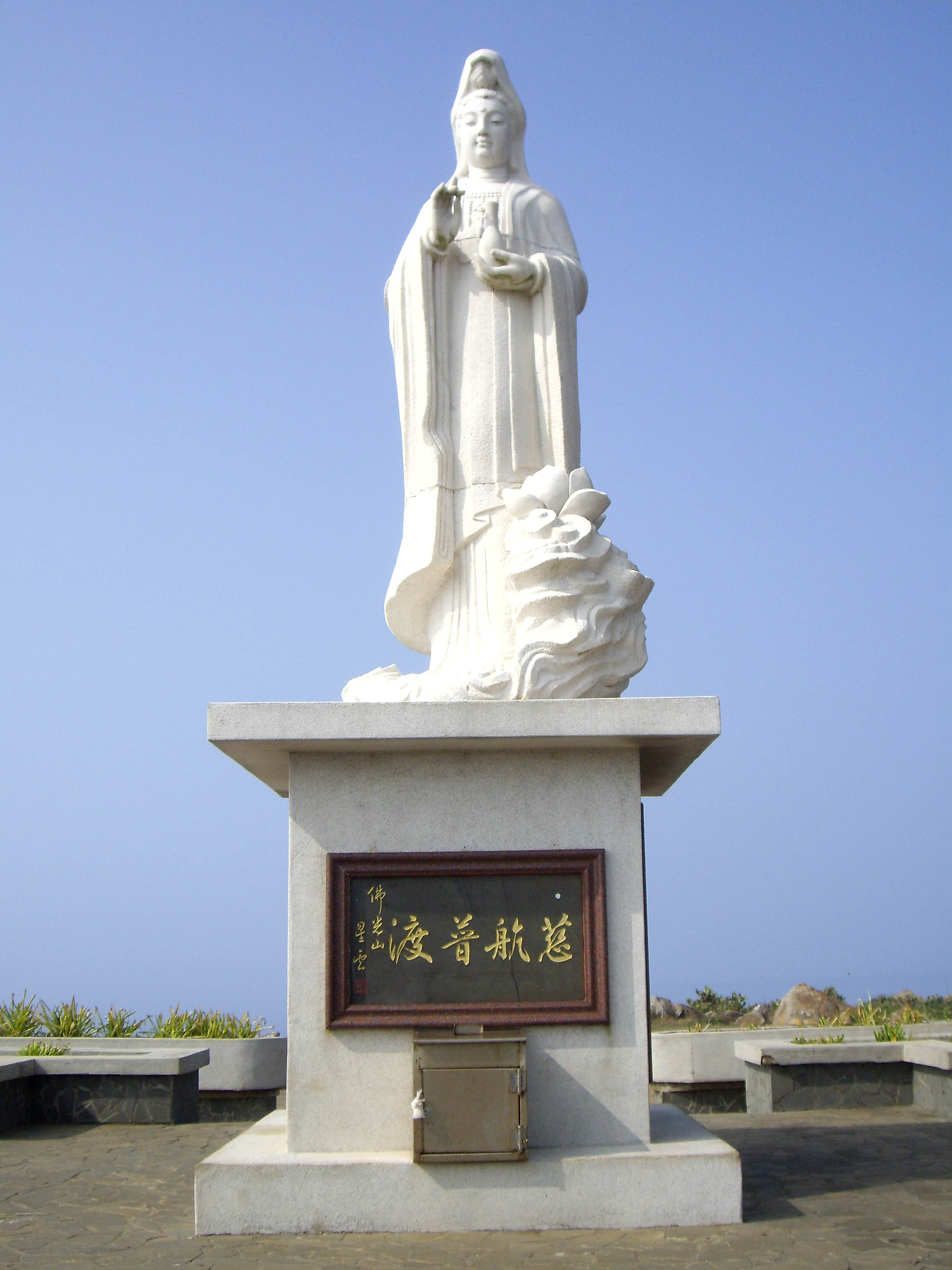
Guanyin Statue

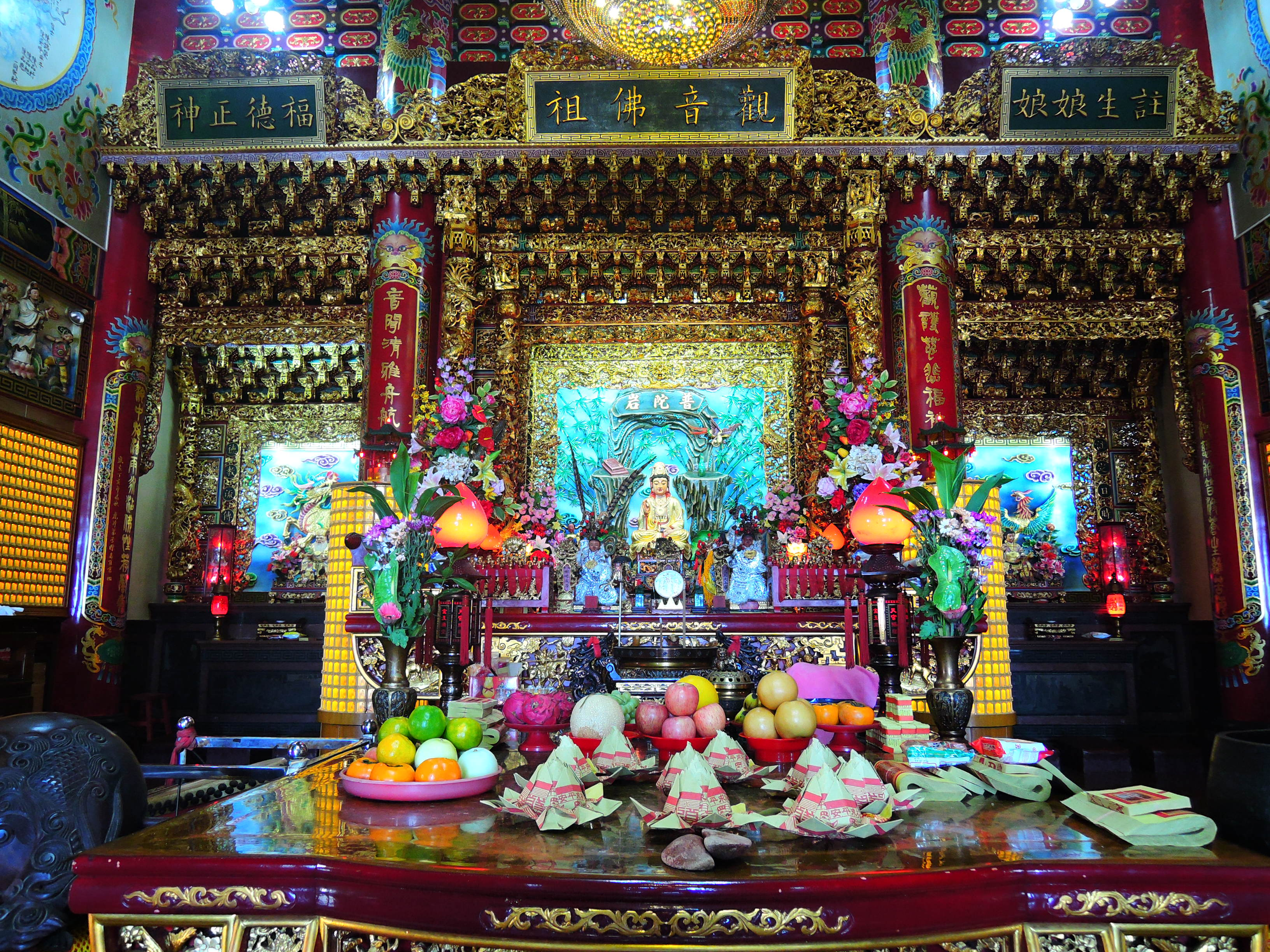
Guanyin Temple

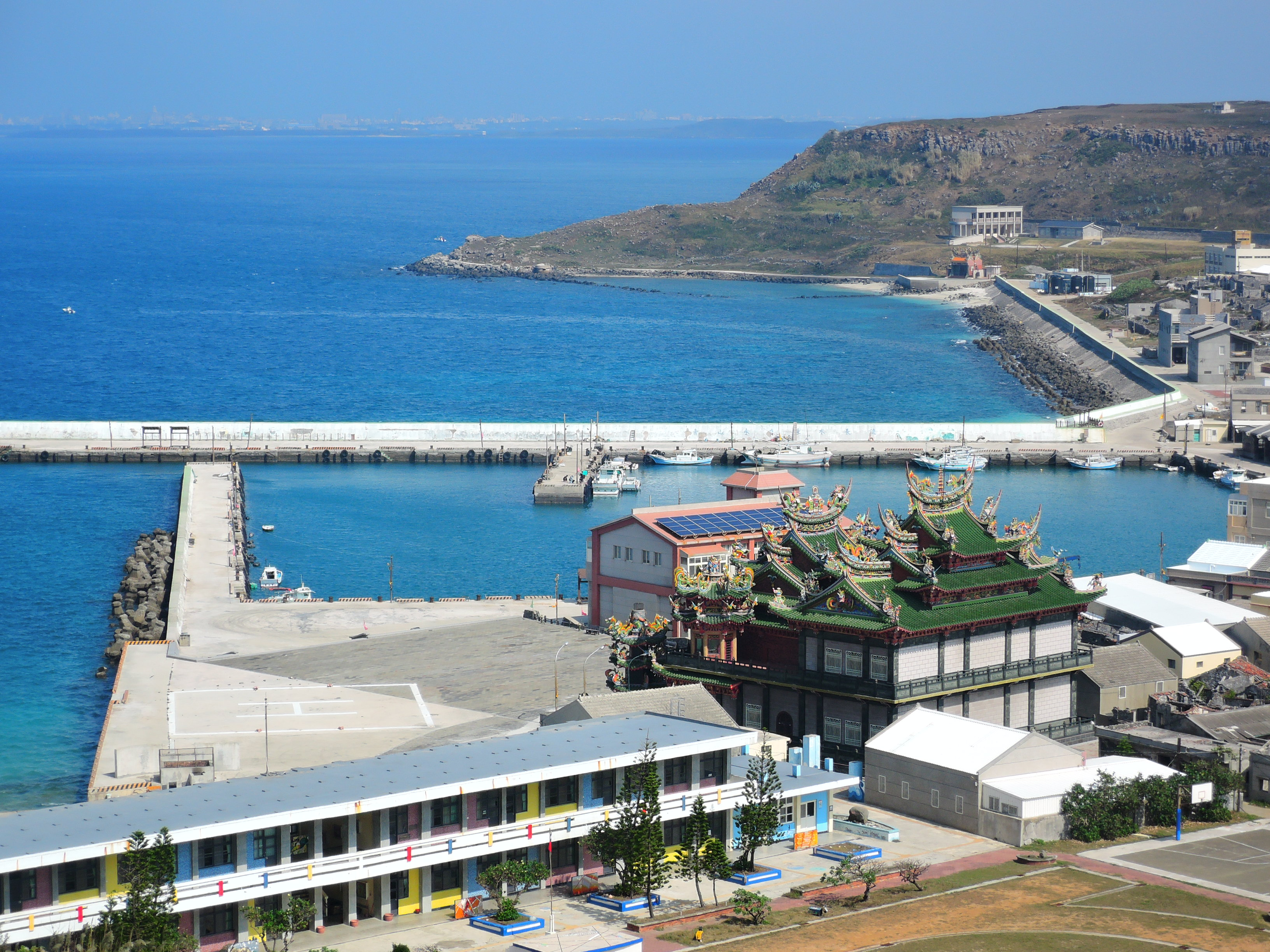
Guanyin Temple

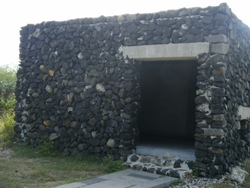
Command Post

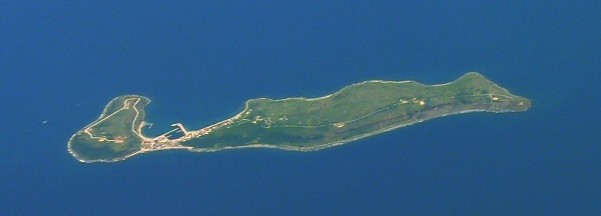
Hujing Island

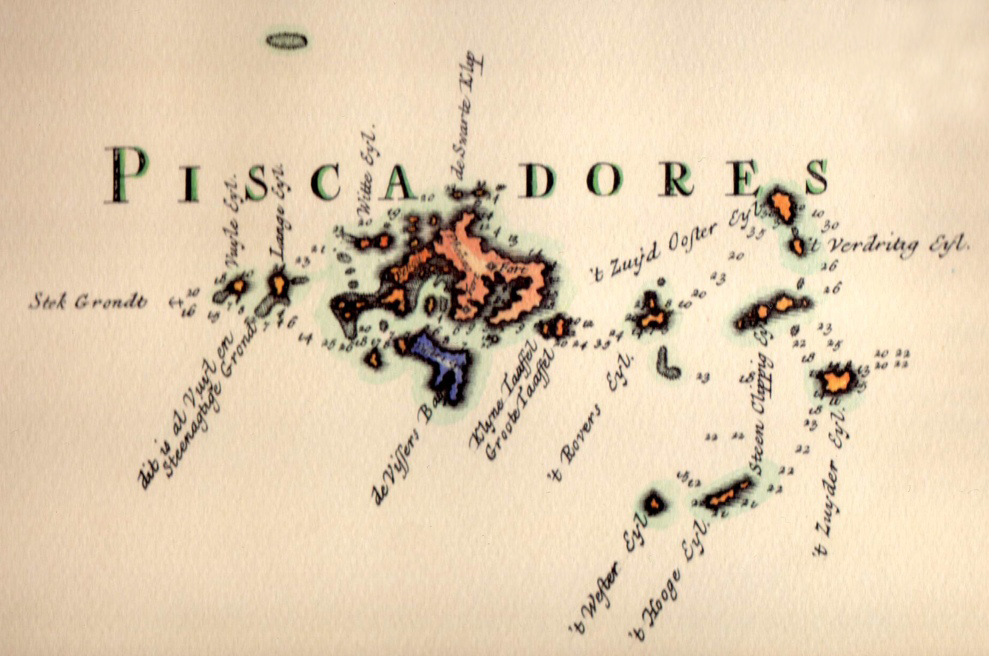
Map of Penghu (the Pescadores) including Hujing Island (labeled as Groote Taaffel) (circa 1726)

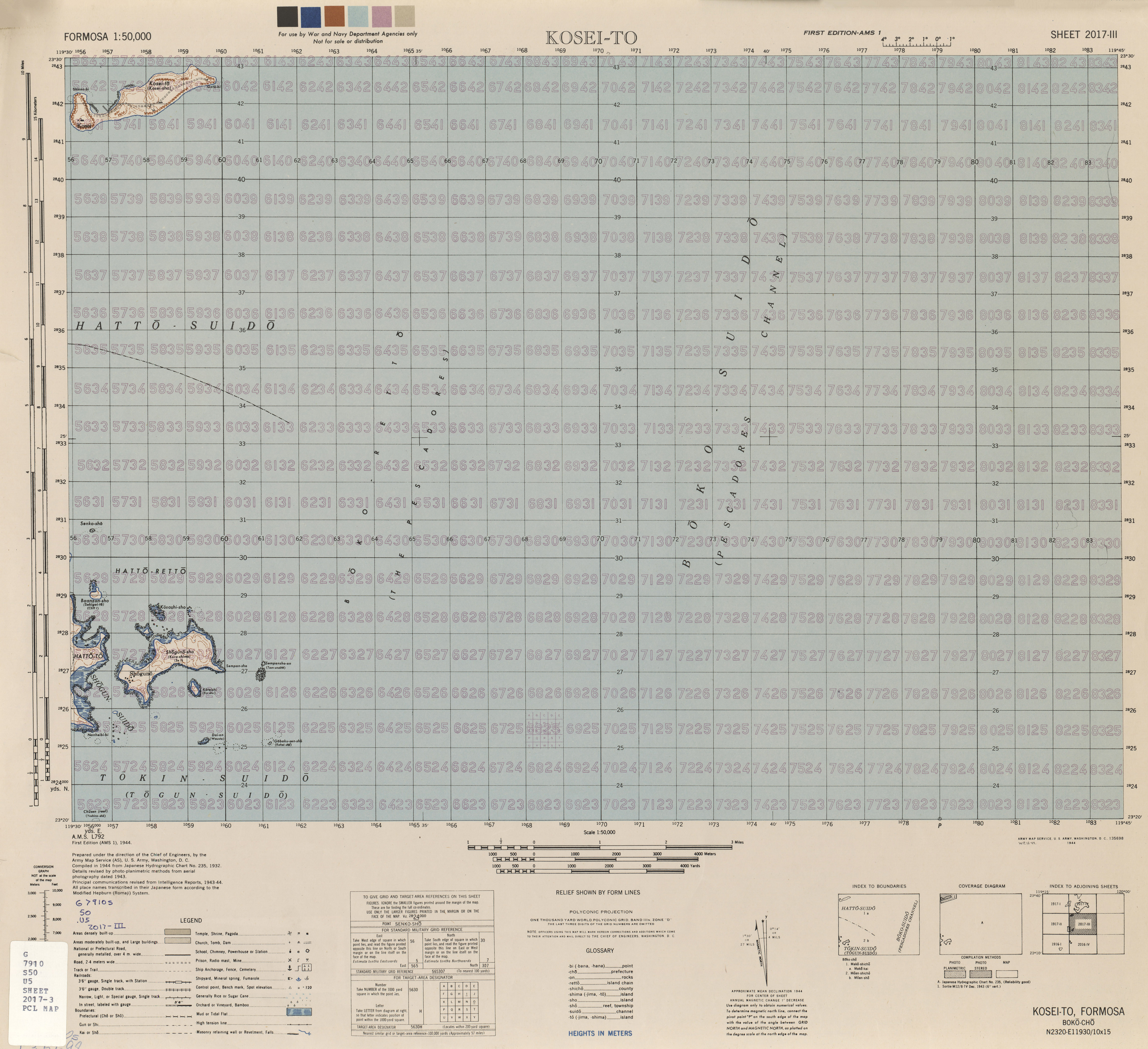
Map of Hujing Island (labeled as Kosei-tō) and surrounding area (AMS, 1944)

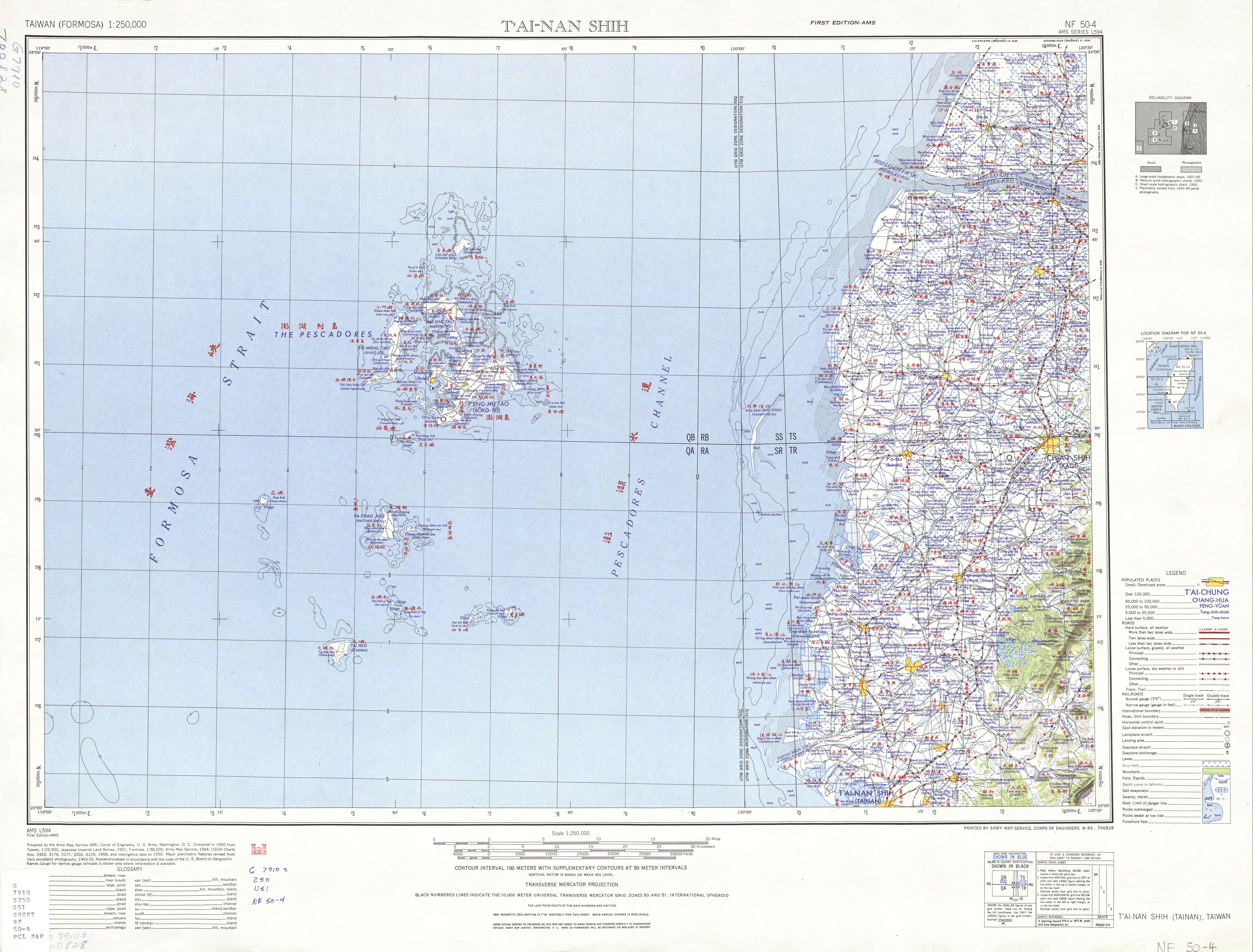
Map including Hujing Island (labeled as Hu-ching hsü (Kosei-sho) 虎井嶼) (AMS, 1950)

== See also ==
- Penghu National Scenic Area
- List of islands of Taiwan
- List of places with columnar jointed volcanics
- Tiger in Chinese culture
