= Murder of Pai Hsiao-yen =

1997 murder in Taiwan

- Location: Wugu Township, Taipei County, Taiwan
- Date: Between 18 April and 20 April 1997
- Attack type: Strangulation, stomach rupture
- Victim: Pai Hsiao-yen
- Perpetrators: Chen Chin-hsing; Lin Chun-sheng; Kao Tien-meen; Chang Chih-huei
- Convictions: Kidnapping, murder
- Sentence: Death (Chen Chin-hsing); Life imprisonment (Chang Chih-huei)
- Convicted: Chen Chin-hsing; Chang Chih-huei

Pai Hsiao-yen
- Born: Pai Hsiao-yen; 23 June 1980; Fukuoka, Japan
- Died: Between 18 April and 20 April 1997 (aged 16); Wugu Township, Taipei County, Taiwan
- Cause of death: Strangulation, stomach rupture
- Education: Hsing Wu High School
- Parents: Ikki Kajiwara (father); Pai Bing-bing (mother)

Pai Hsiao-yen
- Traditional Chinese: 白曉燕
- Simplified Chinese: 白晓燕
Transcriptions
Standard Mandarin
- Hanyu Pinyin: Bái Xiǎoyàn
- Bopomofo: ㄅㄞˊ ㄒㄧㄠˇ ㄧㄢˋ
- Wade–Giles: Pai^{2} Hsiao^{3}-yen^{4}
- IPA: [pǎɪ ɕjàʊjɛ̂n]
Southern Min
- Tâi-lô: Pe̍h Hiáu-iàn

Pai Hsiao-yen (Chinese: 白曉燕; 23 June 1980 – 18–20 April 1997) was the only daughter of Taiwanese television host and actress Pai Bing-bing and Japanese author Ikki Kajiwara. In April 1997, Pai was kidnapped, held for ransom, and murdered by a group of people led by Chen Chin-hsing (陳進興; Chén Jìnxīng), Lin Chun-sheng (林春生; Lín Chūnshēng), and Kao Tien-meen (高天民; Gāo Tiānmín), a trio of criminals previously known to the National Police Agency. Chen, Lin, and Kao evaded a police manhunt for up to eight months, during which they abducted two other people for ransom and killed four people, including a police officer. Ultimately, Lin and Kao committed suicide during encounters with police in August and November, and Chen was arrested and executed after initiating the Alexander family hostage crisis in November.

== Abduction and murder ==
Pai Hsiao-yen disappeared after leaving for her school, Hsing Wu High School, on the morning of April 14, 1997. Her family received a ransom note demanding US$5,000,000 (equivalent to about $10,030,000 in 2025) along with a severed piece of her finger and a photograph of a bound girl.

Press in Taiwan first reported the incident on April 23, which contradicted the accepted practice of reporting the kidnapping after its resolution. Some of the pre-planned ransom drops were aborted when kidnappers spotted police and media tailing Pai Bing-bing. However, after the abductors negotiated with the police for 11 days and changed the locations of payment more than 20 times, the police finally decoded the communication methods used by the abductors. In the subsequent police raid, one suspect was arrested while two others escaped after an intense gun fight with the police.

Pai Hsiao-yen's mutilated body, weighted down with dumbbells, was found in a drainage ditch in Zhonggang Dapai, Taishan Township on April 28. Investigators said that she had been dead for ten days before her body's discovery. Ransom negotiations had continued after the likely time of Pai's death; an impersonator placed a telephone call to give Pai Bing-bing the impression that her daughter was alive. Asiaweek reported that Pai was "apparently tortured" before her death. The photograph of her naked dead body was leaked to the mass media, including the China Times, which printed it.

Four suspects were arrested, but three of the main criminals, Chen Chien-hsing (陳進興; Chén Jìnxīng), Lin Chun-sheng (林春生; Lín Chūnshēng), and Kao Tien-meen (高天民; Gāo Tiānmín), escaped. One of the arrested, Chang Chih-huei (張志輝; Zhāng Zhìhuī), Chen's brother-in-law, was suspected of involvement, but his sentence was eventually overturned due to insufficient evidence and he was released, although he was then sentenced to death in 2005 for a 2004 murder of his ex-girlfriend. He was then found guilty for Pai's murder during a re-trial, but received a life sentence each for both crimes because of his voluntary surrender. Chen Chien-hsing's wife Chen Suzhen was also one of the arrested, but was later found not guilty.

An island-wide manhunt began and the police were ordered to shoot and kill the suspects without warning if they showed any sign of resistance.

== Manhunt ==
While being pursued, the trio abducted Taipei County councilor Tsai Ming-tang on June 3, 1997 and robbed him of $6 million, and on August 6, they kidnapped a businessman surnamed Chen and received a ransom (his family paid the ransom without notifying the police). On August 19, the trio was spotted by two police officers on Wuchang Street (五常街) in Taipei's Zhongshan District. In the ensuing shootout, one of the officers was killed and another officer was injured, while Lin was shot six times and committed suicide instead of surrendering to police. The shootout drew a massive police response of over 800 officers, including the Thunder Squad, to lock down and search the district, but Kao and Chen were not found.

On October 23, Kao and Chen entered the office of a plastic surgeon and demanded immediate facial reconstruction surgeries to become unrecognizable to police. When the plastic surgeon tried to explain that was not possible with the time and resources available to him, Kao and Chen, believing he was trying to stall them for the police to arrive, shot and killed the surgeon, his wife, and a nurse before fleeing. Kao and Chen continued to elude police throughout early November, but on November 17, Kao was spotted by the police and shot himself when they attempted to apprehend him.

On November 18, Chen, the last surviving criminal, broke into the residence of Colonel Edward McGill Alexander, the South African military attaché to Taipei, and took the family hostage. After negotiations initiated by politician Frank Hsieh, Chen surrendered to police and was given media access, and confessed to Pai's kidnapping and other crimes. Chen was convicted in December 1998 for kidnappings, murders, and multiple counts of sexual assault, and was executed on October 6, 1999.

== Aftermath ==
Demonstrators marched on 4 and 18 May 1997, demanding Premier Lien Chan's resignation, partially over the rise in violent crime as evidenced by the then-unsolved murders of Pai, Peng Wan-ru, and Liu Pang-yu. Eight media organizations, including the China Times, which ran the photograph of Pai's body, were condemned during the first protest.

President Lee Teng-hui offered an apology on 15 May, stating Lien would be relieved of his duty as premier and the Cabinet would be reshuffled. Ma Ying-jeou, who was serving as Minister without Portfolio, and Minister of the Interior Lin Fong-cheng resigned following the first protest. Lien resigned his post as Premier on 22 August, as did the director-general of the National Police Agency, Yao Kao-chiao. Lien had repeatedly offered to resign from his other office as Vice President in the wake of the protests; eventually he retained this office until the term ended.

Pai Bing-bing became a social activist advocating the use of death penalty. In 2010, in the wake of the global anti-capital punishment movement, Pai held a protest against then-Minister of Justice Wang Ching-feng, resulting in Wang's resignation and the resumption of executions in Taiwan.

== See also ==
- List of kidnappings (1990–1999)
- List of solved missing person cases (1990s)
