= Life imprisonment =

Criminal punishment

Life imprisonment (or a life sentence) is any sentence of imprisonment in which the convicted individual will remain incarcerated for the rest of their natural life, with or without the possibility of release. Crimes that are punishable by life imprisonment are considered extremely serious and usually violent.

== Law passes ==
Common law murder is a crime for which life imprisonment is mandatory in several countries, including some states of the United States. Life imprisonment (as a maximum term) can also be imposed, in certain countries, for traffic offences causing death. Life imprisonment is not used in all countries; Portugal was the first country to abolish life imprisonment, in 1884, and is the only country in the world that considers this type of punishment for the duration of a convict's natural life – both for minors and adults, with or without the possibility of parole – a violation of human rights. All other Portuguese-speaking countries and Macao also have maximum imprisonment lengths, as do all Spanish-speaking countries in the Americas except for Cuba, Peru, Argentina, Chile and the Mexican state of Chihuahua. Other countries that do not practice life sentences include Mongolia in Asia and Norway, Iceland, Croatia, Bosnia and Herzegovina, Slovenia, Andorra and Montenegro in Europe. Where life imprisonment is a possible sentence, there may also exist formal mechanisms for requesting parole after a certain period of prison time. This means that a convict could be entitled to spend the rest of the sentence (until that individual dies) outside prison. Early release is usually conditional on past and future conduct, possibly with certain restrictions or obligations. In contrast, when a fixed term of imprisonment has ended, the convict is free. The length of time served and the conditions surrounding parole vary. Being eligible for parole does not necessarily ensure that parole will be granted. In some countries, including Sweden, parole does not exist but a life sentence may – after a successful application – be commuted to a fixed-term sentence, after which the offender is released as if the sentence served was that originally imposed.

In some countries around the world, courts have been given the authority to pass prison terms that may amount to de facto life imprisonment, meaning that the sentence would last longer than the human life expectancy. For example, in one American case a court imposed a sentence of life plus 1,000 years. Courts in South Africa have handed out at least two sentences that have exceeded a century, while in Tasmania, Australia, Martin Bryant, the perpetrator of the Port Arthur massacre in 1996, received 35 life sentences plus 1,035 years without parole. In the United States, James Holmes, the perpetrator of the 2012 Aurora theater shooting, received 12 consecutive life sentences plus 3,318 years without the possibility of parole. In the case of mass murder in the US, Parkland mass murderer Nikolas Cruz was sentenced to 34 consecutive terms of life imprisonment (without parole) for murdering 17 people and injuring another 17 at a school. Any sentence without parole effectively means a sentence cannot be suspended; a life sentence without parole, therefore, means that in the absence of circumstances such as pardon, amnesty or humanitarian grounds (e.g. imminent death), the prisoner will spend the rest of their natural life in prison.

In several countries where de facto life terms are used, a release on humanitarian grounds (also known as compassionate release) is commonplace, such as in the case of Abdelbaset al-Megrahi. Since the behaviour of a prisoner serving a life sentence without parole is not relevant to the execution of such sentence, many people among lawyers, penitentiary specialists, criminologists, but most of all among human rights organizations oppose that punishment. In particular, they emphasize that when faced with a prisoner with no hope of ever being released, the prison has no means to discipline such a prisoner effectively. The European Court of Human Rights (ECtHR) has considered the issue of life imprisonment without the possibility of parole, particularly in relation to Article 3 of the European Convention on Human Rights, which prohibits inhuman or degrading treatment or punishment. The Court has ruled that irreducible life sentences (i.e. an imprisonment for life-regime without parole) violate Article 3. However, the Court has also stated that life sentences can be imposed without breaching Article 3 if there are guarantees of review and release.

In some countries, young adults (18-21) may be able to receive life sentences without the possibility of parole. The use of those sentences has been the subject of continuous ethical, scientific, and legal debate. There has been research in developmental neuroscience on maturity levels in the adolescent brain. Most of the research signifies that adolescent regions of the brain involved in impulse control and judgment are not developed to the extent they need to be to make sound decisions. These findings bring up discussions about how appropriate it is to send youth to life without parole.

A few countries allow for a minor to be given a life sentence without parole; these include but are not limited to: Antigua and Barbuda, Argentina (only over the age of 16), Australia, Belize, Brunei, Cuba, Dominica, Saint Vincent and the Grenadines, the Solomon Islands, Sri Lanka, and the United States. According to a University of San Francisco School of Law study, only the US had minors serving such sentences in 2008. In 2009, Human Rights Watch estimated that there were 2,589 youth offenders serving life sentences without the possibility for parole in the US. Since the start of 2020, that number has fallen to 1,465. The United States has the highest population of prisoners serving life sentences for both adults and minors, at a rate of 50 people per 100,000 (1 out of 2,000) residents imprisoned for life.

== By country ==
In several countries, life imprisonment has been effectively abolished. Many of the countries whose governments have abolished both life imprisonment and indefinite imprisonment have been culturally influenced or colonized by Spain or Portugal and have written such prohibitions into their current constitutional laws (including Portugal itself but not Spain).

=== Comparison map ===
Life imprisonment laws around the world: Life imprisonment is a legal penalty. Life imprisonment is a legal penalty, but with certain restrictions. Life imprisonment is illegal. Unknown

=== Comparison table ===
Jurisdiction (link to details)	Life sentence	Maximum length of definite sentence (assuming life, or indefinite, sentence does not exist or not imposed)	Indefinite (possibly life) sentence (excl. preventive/psychiatric detainment)	Minimum time served before parole eligibility (assuming life sentence without parole, or indefinite sentence, does not exist or not imposed)	Mandatory life sentence	Other crimes with possible life sentence	Under age of 18 (or 21)	Pardon, amnesty, other release	Death penalty
Argentina	Yes	None	No	35 years	Yes; for aggravated murder, sexual abuse resulting in the death of the victim, coercive or ransom kidnapping resulting the death of the victim, forced disappearance, torture resulting in death and treason	Crimes against the security of the nation	No for those under the age of 18; life sentence imposed in all cases on those who were at least 18 when the crime was committed	By president (except for cases of crimes against humanity)	No
Australia	Yes	None	Yes See also: Immigration detention in Australia	Federal: For terrorism and treason offences: 22.5 years. State laws vary.	Yes; for murder in Queensland, Western Australia, South Australia, Northern Territory; for murder of police officer in New South Wales	Main article: Life imprisonment in Australia § State and territories Federal: Main article: Life imprisonment in Australia § Commonwealth State laws vary.	Federal, NSW, QLD, WA, SA, Tas, NT: Yes; Vic, ACT: No	Federal: By governor general; NSW, Vic, QLD, WA, SA, Tas, ACT, NT: by statute	No
Austria	Yes	None	Yes but only if clemency is rejected by president	15 years (Imprisonment for a definite period) or never (Imprisonment for lifetime, when clemency is rejected by president)	Genocide	Murder, high level drug dealing, Nazi activism, production or distribution of chemical warfare agents to be used in armed conflict; abduction, robbery, rape and statutory rape if the crime causes the victim's death, sea and air piracy and arson if the crime causes the death of a large number of people	under 16: max. 10 years' imprisonment; 16–17: max. 15 years' imprisonment; 18–20: max. 20 years' imprisonment	By president	No (abolished in 1968)
Azerbaijan	Yes, but only for men aged 18–65	15 years for a single murder (up to 20 years for several crimes)	No	25 years	None	Crimes against the state, war crimes	14–17: max. 10 years' imprisonment	By president	No
Belgium	Yes	None	No	15 years (no previous conviction or below 3 years), 19 years (previous conviction below 5 years), or 23 years (previous conviction 5 years or more)	None	Murder	under 12: cannot be prosecuted; 12–15: max. 14 years' imprisonment; 16–17: max. 30 years' imprisonment	Parole by Conditional Release Commission or pardon by monarch	No
Brazil	No	40 years	No	Varies, depending on sentence	No life imprisonment sentence	No life imprisonment sentence	No	No life imprisonment sentence	Yes, but only in times of war
Bulgaria	Yes	None	Yes	20 years	None	Aggravated murder, aggravated kidnapping, aggravated robbery, treason, espionage, war crimes, genocide, desertion in wartime	under 14: cannot be prosecuted; 14-16: maximum 10 years; 16-18: maximum 12 years	By president	No
Canada	Yes	None	Yes	25 years for first-degree murder or high treason; 10 years minimum for second-degree murder. 7–25 years for any other offence where the maximum penalty is life imprisonment.	High treason, first-degree murder, second-degree murder	Various crimes including attempted murder, aircraft hijacking, armed robbery, kidnapping, aggravated sexual assault, conspiracy to murder and most offenses resulting in death	12-13: maximum 10 years of imprisonment; 14+: Yes, but only if juvenile is sentenced as adult	Yes, but only through royal prerogative of mercy	No (abolished in 1976)
People's Republic of China	Yes	13 for a single murder if it is the perpetrator's first offence. 15–20 for a single murder that is the perpetrator's second offence if he/she serves the sentence with good behaviour	No	13 years of the original sentence having been actually served. Never in extremely serious corruption cases.	No	Various	Yes	By courts and by president	Yes
Croatia	No	40 years	No	Varies, depending on sentence	No life imprisonment sentence	No life imprisonment sentence	under 14: cannot be prosecuted; 14-16: Only educational measures; 16–17: Imprisonment of up to 10 years only in serious cases, otherwise educational measures	No life imprisonment sentence	No (abolished in 1991)
Czech Republic	Yes	30 years	No	20 years generally; 30 or more years if part of sentence	None	Some cases of murder, public endangerment, treason, terrorism, genocide, crimes against humanity, use of forbidden combat device or forbidden combat tactics, war crimes, persecution of population, misuse of international symbols	15–18: max. 10 years' imprisonment	By president	No
Denmark	Yes	none	Yes	12 years	No	Treason, espionage during wartime, use of force against the parliament, terrorism, arson under circumstances that are life-threatening, hijacking of vehicles, willful release of nuclear substances, murder	under 15: no imprisonment; 15–17: 16 years under normal circumstances, 20 years if gang-related	After 12 years entitled to request to minister of justice; granted by monarch	No
Estonia	Yes	None	Yes (de facto)	30 years	None	Some cases of murder, some cases of handling drugs, crimes against humanity, genocide, acts of war against civilians, terrorism, violence against the independence of Estonia, causing an explosion using nuclear energy	Maximum length 10 years. Under 14 cannot be criminally prosecuted.	Pardon by president	No
Finland	Yes	None	Yes	12 years for court release; any time for presidential pardon	Murder	High treason, espionage, genocide, crimes against humanity, war crimes, homicidal terrorist act, crime against peace	Under 15: No criminal penalties; 15–17: max. 12 years' imprisonment for a single offence, 15 for multiple offences; 18–20: Life with reduced minimum of 10 years for parole request	By president, Helsinki Court of Appeal	No
Germany	Yes (for adults between 18 and 21 only if tried as adults)	None	No	Before 1977: never (except with presidential pardon). Ruled unconstitutional by Federal Constitutional Court; Since 1977: Normally 15 years. In exceptionally serious cases the minimum to serve before the possibility of parole can be increased at the courts discretion with no fixed limit. Decisions of the constitutional court require that there is a realistic chance of release and that age and serious illnesses of the convicted must be taken into account, when a minimum time to serve in exceptionally serious cases is set.	Aggravated murder, genocide resulting in death, crimes against humanity resulting in death, war crimes against persons resulting in death	Main article: Life imprisonment in Germany § Crimes allowing for life imprisonment	Under 14: no prosecution; 14–18: maximum 10 years; 18–21: maximum of 15 years or life	By federal president or minister-president	No (abolished in West Germany by the Constitution since 23 May 1949; abolished by law in West Germany in 1953 and in East Germany in 1987)
Greece	Yes	None	Yes	20 or 18 years	Yes; homicide with intent in a calm state of mind, distinguished variants of rape, as well as distinguished variants of robbery	Treason	Yes	No	No (abolished in 1993)
Guinea-Bissau	No	??	No	Varies, depending on sentence	No life imprisonment sentence	No life imprisonment sentence	No life imprisonment sentence	No life imprisonment sentence	No
Ireland	Yes	None	No	12 years	Murder, treason	Main article: Life imprisonment in Ireland § Offences carrying a possible life sentence	age 10–11: rape or murder; age 12+: yes	By president	No
Lebanon	Yes	None	No	10 years	Aggravated murder, terrorism, treason	Rape	Yes	By president	No (abolished in August 2026)
Lithuania	Yes	None	Yes	25 years	None	Genocide, prohibited mistreatment of persons under international law, war crimes, crimes against humanity, prohibited military attack, attempted assassination of the president of Lithuania, attempted assassination of a governmental official or foreign official, murder with aggravated circumstances, murder of persons protected under international humanitarian law, terrorism resulting in death, piracy (hijacking of a civilian aircraft or civilian vessel) that results in death or otherwise has grave consequences to the safety of others	Under 14: No criminal penalties; 14–17: No life imprisonment	By president	No (abolished in 1998)
Macau, China	No	25 years (30 in exceptional circumstances)	No	Varies, depending on sentence	No life imprisonment sentence	No life imprisonment sentence	No life imprisonment sentence	No life imprisonment sentence	No
Mexico	No (except in Chihuahua for murder involving kidnapping)	24 years (74 years if convicted of murder involving kidnapping); in the state of Chihuahua, murder involving kidnapping provides for a mandatory life sentence	No	Varies, depending on sentence	Murder involving kidnapping	None	??	??	No
Netherlands	Yes	None	Yes	Never	None	Murder, aggravated manslaughter, various crimes against the Dutch state, attacks on the monarch, crimes with a terrorist motive, and leading a terrorist organization in especially serious circumstances	under 12: no imprisonment; 12–18: no life imprisonment	After 25 years served, the Advisory College for the Lifelong Incarcerated reviews whether a return into society is advisable, but only a pardon by royal decree from the monarch can rescind a life sentence.	No
Nigeria	Yes	None	Yes	Never	??	??	under 7: no imprisonment; 7-18: no life imprisonment	??	Yes
Norway	Life imprisonment only under military criminal code	Maximum sentence 21 years (30 years if convicted of aggravated terrorism) with possibility to renew the sentence in exceptional cases.	No	No life imprisonment	??	??	Under 15: No criminal penalties	??	No (Fully abolished in 1979, constitutional ban since 2014)
Poland	Yes	30 years	No	Any minimum term from 30 to 50 years; individually set by the judge. In 2022, legislative changes passed through Polish parliament introduced the possibility of imposing a sentence of life imprisonment without any possibility of parole (meaning the offender will spend the rest of their life in prison, unless pardoned by president). This happened despite Poland being signatory to the European Convention of Human Rights and must abide by the judgments of the European Court of Human Rights, which considers life imprisonment without parole as a violation of Article 3, which protects against inhuman or degrading treatment and punishment. However, no person in Poland has yet been sentenced to life imprisonment without the possibility of parole.	None	Treason, assassination of Polish president, war of aggression, genocide, crimes against humanity, unlawful use of weapon of mass destruction, war crimes, murder, homicide and serious bodily harm resulting in death	under 15: no imprisonment; 15-18: max. 30 years' imprisonment, but only if juvenile is tried as adult	Pardon by president	No (abolished during peacetime in 1998 and under all circumstances in 2014)
Portugal	No	25 years imprisonment	No	No life Imprisonment	No	No	Under 12: No prosecution; 12-16: Maximum imprisonment duration of 3 years; 16+: Maximum imprisonment duration of 25 years.	Pardon and Amnesty by the President	No, abolished in 1976
Romania	Yes	None	No; replaced by 25 years' imprisonment at age 60	20 years	Genocide during wartime, inhumane treatment during wartime	Treason and other grave crimes against the state, extremely grave murder, capitulation, desertion on the battlefield, crimes against peace or humanity	under 18: max. 20 years' imprisonment	Pardon by president, amnesty by act of parliament	No
Serbia	Yes	None	??	27 years or Never	None	Murder, Treason, Genocide, Crimes against Humanity, Rape resulting in Death, Any act covered by the previous 30-40 year sentence	Under 14:no imprisonment	Pardon by president	No
Singapore	Yes	None	Yes, for offenders of unsound mind; see also: The President's Pleasure (Singapore)	20 years	Yes; for certain offences, including possession of firearms at time of arrest for any offence, hijacking of aircraft and piracy	Murder (if no intent to cause death), drug trafficking (if acted as couriers or mentally ill), culpable homicide not amounting to murder (manslaughter), kidnapping by ransom, criminal breach of trust by a public servant, voluntarily causing grievous hurt with dangerous weapons, and trafficking of firearms and more than 30 other offences	under 14: no imprisonment; 14–17: applied for certain offences, but mandatory for murder, drug trafficking and other offences that attract the death penalty (imposition of death not allowed for minors below 18)	Clemency by the President of Singapore	Yes
Slovakia	Yes; only if necessary to protect society and given the convict is unlikely to be rehabilitated	None	Yes	25 years	Aggravated murder, genocide, terrorism, war crimes, recidivism of certain aggravated offenses	Under certain, aggravated conditions (usually causing death): crimes against humanity, drug trafficking, human trafficking, child trafficking, false imprisonment, hostage taking, kidnapping, robbery, extortion, domestic violence, kidnapping, public endangerment, air/sea piracy, treason, sabotage, espionage, assaulting a public official	under 14: no imprisonment; 14–17: max. 15 years' imprisonment	By president	No
Slovenia	Yes	None	Yes	25 years	Murder	Terrorism, drug offenses, crimes against humanity	under 16: no imprisonment; 16–17: max. 10 years of imprisonment in juvenile prison	By president	No
Spain	Yes	30 years	No	18 to 22 years for furlough, 25 to 35 years for parole, depending on the number of crimes and the crimes themselves	Assassination of: The monarch, his/her spouse, or the heir to the Throne; A foreign head of state or diplomat; Genocide	Murder, if: Of a minor under 16; Of a person suffering a disability or medical condition; Together with rape; Carried out by member(s) of organized crime; Multiple murder; Attempt of genocide if resulting in death, rape or mutilation; Crimes against humanity, if resulting in death	No	By Cabinet	No
Sweden	Yes	None	Yes	Before 2006: Never (unless pardoned by the government); After 2006: The offender can apply for conversion to a fixed term sentence after 10 years. The fixed term shall be at least 18 years and under normal parole regulations two thirds are served before release (minimum 12 years served for a life prisoner).	None	Murder, kidnapping, arson, sabotage, dangerous destruction of property, hijacking, espionage, terror crimes, rebellion, endangering the public health by spread of contagion or poison, disloyalty when negotiating with foreign powers, trading in anti-personnel mines, cluster bombs or chemical or nuclear weapons, unlawful nuclear explosion, treason, genocide; in wartime only: mutiny, insubordination, undermining the will to fight, desertion, unauthorised capitulation, negligence of war preparations and negligence of battle duty; attempts, accessories, accomplices and incitements of all the above crimes might also be punished with life imprisonment.	under 15: no penalty; 15–17: max 14 years of imprisonment; 18–20: max 14 years of imprisonment (until 1 January 2022, onwards the same rules as for other offenders are applied in cases of serious offences)	By the district court of Örebro (parole hearing) or by the government (pardon)	No
Switzerland	Yes	10 years or 15 years; individually set by judge	None	No	None	Aggravated murder, aggravated hostage-taking, genocide, endangering the independence of the country	under 15: no imprisonment; 15–17: max. 4 years' imprisonment	By Federal Assembly (Parliament)	No
Taiwan	Yes	25 years	None	No	Main article: Life imprisonment in Taiwan § Crimes with life imprisonment as minimum sentence	Main article: Life imprisonment in Taiwan § Other crimes allowing for life imprisonment	under 18: No, automatic reduction if mandatory	By president	Yes
United Kingdom: England and Wales	Yes	15 years or longer (maximum of whole life order), but individually set by judge. A whole life order means life without parole (e.g. natural life in prison until death). However, there is, at least in theory, a possibility of release of prisoners serving such sentences, as the Secretary of State for Justice has the power to release on licence any life sentence prisoner on compassionate grounds in exceptional circumstances.	None	Imprisonment for public protection – abolished in 2012 but offenders already serving that sentence remain in prison. Persons under 18 years of age may be sentenced to detention at His Majesty's pleasure for an indeterminite period.	Murder and treason	Rape, armed robbery, kidnapping, false imprisonment, manslaughter, attempted murder, soliciting murder, threats to kill, wounding with intent to cause grievous bodily harm, malicious wounding, using chloroform etc., maliciously administering poison, abandoning children, other serious crimes and other common law offences where the maximum penalty is life imprisonment.	No, but offenders under 18 can be sentenced to detention for an indeterminate period. Whole life orders cannot be given to offenders under 21.	Amnesty by royal decree (by means of the royal prerogative of mercy) alone or with act of Parliament	No (abolished in 1998)
United Kingdom: Scotland	Yes	Individually set by judge	Between 17 and 30 years for a single murder without any additional circumstances	Never	Murder with additional circumstances, two or more murders, attempted murder, two or more counts rape	Any other common law offence	Under 12: Cannot be convicted; Above 12: Detention for an indeterminate period	Compassionate release by cabinet secretary for justice (Scottish government); amnesty by royal decree (by means of the royal prerogative of mercy) alone or with act of Parliament	No (abolished in 1998)
United Kingdom: Northern Ireland	Yes	Individually set by judge	None	No	Murder, rape	Robbery	??	General release through a referendum-based agreement in 1998 (became applicable in three cases: i, ii, iii). The royal prerogative of mercy or an act of the UK Parliament (in accordance with the principle of parliamentary sovereignty) can be used to grant amnesty like the rest of the UK.	No (abolished in 1998)
United States	Yes (except in Alaska)	Varies by state	Varies by state; 99 years in Alaska	Never	Varies by state	Varies by state	Yes (de jure)	By president or governor of a state (depending on jurisdiction)	Yes (depending on state)
Uruguay	No	Varies, depending on sentence	45 years	No	No life imprisonment sentence	No life imprisonment sentence	No life imprisonment sentence	No life imprisonment sentence	No

=== Detailed analysis ===
==== Europe ====
A number of European countries have abolished all forms of indefinite imprisonment. Croatia set maximum prison sentence at 40 years (50 years in exceptional circumstances). In the Bosnia and Herzegovina the maximum prison sentence is set at 45 years on federal level, in Federation of Bosnia and Herzegovina and Brčko Distrikt, while Republika Srpska, which previously also set maximum prison term at 45 years, has reinstated a life sentence. Portugal abolished all forms of life imprisonment with the prison reforms of Sampaio e Melo in 1884 and has a maximum sentence of 25 years.

Life imprisonment in Spain was abolished in 1928, but reinstated in 2015 and upheld by the Constitutional Court in 2021. Serbia previously had a maximum prison sentence of 40 years; life imprisonment was instated in 2019 by amendments to the country's criminal code, alongside a three-strikes law. In Kosovo, life imprisonment was also reinstated in 2019.

In Europe, there are many jurisdictions where the law expressly provides for life sentences without the possibility of parole. These are England and Wales (within the United Kingdom; see Life imprisonment in England and Wales), the Netherlands, Moldova, Bulgaria, Italy (only for persons who refuse to cooperate with authorities and are sentenced for mafia activities or terrorism), Ukraine, Turkey and Serbia.

In Sweden, although the law does not expressly provide for life without the possibility of release, some convicted persons may never be released, on the grounds that they are too dangerous. In Italy, persons who refuse to cooperate with authorities and are sentenced for mafia activities or terrorism are ineligible for parole and thus will spend the rest of their lives in prison. In Austria, life imprisonment will mean imprisonment for the remainder of the offender's life unless clemency is granted by the President of Austria or it can be assumed that the convicted person will not commit any further crimes; the probationary period is ten years. In Malta, prior to 2018, there was no possibility of parole for any person sentenced to life imprisonment, and any form of release from a life sentence was only possible by clemency granted by the President of Malta. In France, while the law does not expressly provide for life imprisonment without any possibility of parole, a court can rule in exceptionally serious circumstances that convicts are ineligible for automatic parole consideration after 30 years if convicted of child murder involving rape or torture, premeditated murder of a state official or terrorism resulting in death. In Moldova, there is never a possibility of parole for anyone sentenced to life imprisonment, as life imprisonment is defined as the "deprivation of liberty of the convict for the entire rest of his/her life". Where mercy is granted in relation to a person serving life imprisonment, imprisonment thereof must not be less than 30 years. In Ukraine, life imprisonment means for the rest of one's life with the only possibilities for release being a terminal illness or a presidential pardon. In Albania, while no person sentenced to life imprisonment is eligible for standard parole, a conditional release is still possible if the prisoner is found not likely to re-offend and has displayed good behaviour, and has served at least 25 years.

Before 2016 in the Netherlands, there was never a possibility of parole for any person sentenced to life imprisonment, and any form of release for life convicted in the country was only possible when granted royal decree by the King of the Netherlands, with the last granting of a pardon taking place in 1986 when a terminally ill convict was released. As of 1970, the Dutch monarch has pardoned a total of three convicts. Although there is no possibility of parole eligibility, since 2016 prisoners sentenced to life imprisonment in the Netherlands are eligible to have their cases reviewed after serving at least 25 years. This change in law was because the European Court of Human Rights stated in 2013 that lifelong imprisonment without the chance of being released is inhumane.

Even in other European countries that do provide for life without parole, courts continue to retain judicial discretion to decide whether a sentence of life should include parole or not. In Albania, the decision of whether or not a life-convicted person is eligible for parole is up to the prison complex after 25 years have been served, and release eligibility depends on the prospect of rehabilitation and how likely they are to re-offend. In Europe, only Ukraine and Moldova explicitly exclude parole or any form of sentence commutation for life sentences in all cases.

==== South America ====
In South and Central America, Honduras, Nicaragua, Costa Rica, Venezuela, Colombia, Uruguay, Bolivia, Ecuador, and the Dominican Republic have all abolished life imprisonment. The maximum sentence is 60 years in Colombia, 50 years in Costa Rica and Panama, 40 years in Honduras and Brazil, 30 years in Nicaragua, Bolivia, Uruguay, Venezuela and the Dominican Republic, and 25 years in Paraguay and Ecuador.

Countries in the region where life imprisonment is a legal sentence include Argentina, Guyana, Peru, and El Salvador, which introduced the maximum sentence of life amid its gang crackdown.

==== Canada ====
Life imprisonment in Canada is a criminal sentence for certain offences that lasts for the offender’s life. Parole is possible, but even if paroled, the offender remains under the supervision of Corrections Canada for their lifetime, and can be returned to prison for parole violations.

A person serving a life sentence must serve for a certain length of time before becoming eligible for parole. First degree murder and high treason carry the longest period of parole ineligibility in the Criminal Code, at 25 years. A statutory amendment to allow periods of parole ineligibility greater than 25 years was held to be unconstitutional by the Supreme Court of Canada in R v Bissonnette (2022 SCC 23), as contrary to section 12 of the Canadian Charter of Rights and Freedoms, which prohibits cruel and unusual punishment. Parole eligibility for second degree murder typically varies between 10 and 25 years, and is set by the sentencing judge.

A life sentence is the most severe punishment for any crime in Canada. Criminal laws are enacted by the Parliament of Canada and apply uniformly across the country.

==== El Salvador ====
On March 17, 2026, the Legislative Assembly of El Salvador approved a constitutional amendment to allow life imprisonment for murder, rape, and acts of terrorism. Specifically, the second paragraph of Article 27 of the Constitution of the Republic of El Salvador was amended, stating that "life imprisonment shall only be imposed on murders, rapists and terrorists". This following reform allowed children under the age of 18 to be imprisoned, with many questioning the ethics of this decision including UNICEF.

==== Philippines ====
Life imprisonment is a penalty imposed in the Philippines where a convict is imprisoned indefinitely. It is often confused for reclusión perpetua which entails imprisonment of at least 20 years and one day to a maximum of 40 years, after which the convicted would be eligible for parole.

==== United States ====
Legal Framework and Key Court Rulings

In 2011, the Supreme Court of the United States ruled that sentencing minors to life without parole, automatically (as the result of a statute) or as the result of a judicial decision, for crimes other than intentional homicide, violated the Eighth Amendment's ban on "Cruel and unusual punishments", in the case of Graham v. Florida.

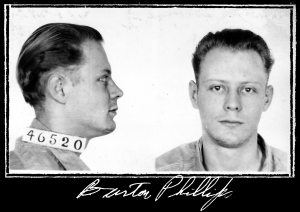
Mugshot of Burton Phillips, sentenced to life imprisonment for bank robbery, 1935

Graham v. Florida was a significant case in juvenile justice. In Jacksonville, Florida, Terrence J. Graham tried to rob a restaurant along with three adolescent accomplices. During the robbery, one of Graham's accomplices had a metal bar that he used to hit the restaurant manager twice in the head. Once arrested, Graham was charged with attempted armed robbery and armed burglary with assault/battery. The maximum sentence he faced for these charges was life without the possibility of parole, and the prosecutor wanted to charge him as an adult. During the trial, Graham pleaded guilty to the charges, resulting in three years of probation, one year of which had to be served in jail. Since he had been awaiting trial in jail, he already served six months and, therefore, was released after six additional months.

Within six months of his release, Graham was involved in another robbery. Since he violated the conditions of his probation, his probation officer reported to the trial court about his probation violations a few weeks before Graham turned 18 years old. It was a different judge presiding over his trial for the probation violations a year later. While Graham denied any involvement in the robbery, he did admit to fleeing from the police. The trial court found that Graham violated his probation by "committing a home invasion robbery, possessing a firearm, and associating with persons engaged in criminal activity", and sentenced him to 15 years for the attempted armed robbery plus life imprisonment for the armed burglary. The life sentence Graham received meant he had a life sentence without the possibility of parole, "because Florida abolished their parole system in 2003".

Graham's case was presented to the Supreme Court of the United States, with the question of whether juveniles should receive life without the possibility of parole in non-homicide cases. The Justices eventually ruled that such a sentence violated the juvenile's 8th Amendment rights, protecting them from punishments that are disproportionate to the crime committed, resulting in the abolition of life sentences without the possibility of parole in non-homicide cases for juveniles.

In 2012, the Supreme Court ruled in the case of Miller v. Alabama in a 5–4 decision and with the majority opinion written by Associate Justice Elena Kagan that mandatory sentences of life in prison without parole for juvenile offenders are unconstitutional. The majority opinion stated that barring a judge from considering mitigating factors and other information, such as age, maturity, and family and home environment violated the Eighth Amendment ban on cruel and unusual punishment. Sentences of life in prison without parole can still be given to juveniles for aggravated first-degree murder, as long as the judge considers the circumstances of the case.

In 2016 the Supreme Court ruled in the case of Montgomery v. Louisiana that the rulings imposed by Miller v. Alabama were to apply retroactively, causing a substantial amount of appeals to decade-old sentences for then-juvenile offenders.

In 2021, the Supreme Court ruled in Jones v. Mississippi that sentencers are not required to make a separate finding of the defendant to be "permanently incorrigible" prior to sentencing a juvenile to life without parole.

==== Vatican City ====
Pope Francis called for the abolition of both capital punishment and life imprisonment in a meeting with representatives of the International Association of Penal Law. He also stated that life imprisonment, removed from the Vatican City penal code in 2013, is just a variation of the death penalty.

==== Malaysia ====
Originally in Malaysia, life imprisonment was construed as a jail term lasting the remainder of a convict's natural life, either with or without the possibility of parole. In April 2023, the Malaysian government officially abolished natural life imprisonment and instead redefined a life sentence as a jail term between 30 and 40 years. At the time of the reform, at least 117 prisoners were serving natural life imprisonment, consisting of 70 whose original death sentences were commuted to life (without parole) prior to the reform, and another 47 whose sentences of life were imposed by the courts, and all of these life convicts were allowed to have their jail terms reduced to between 30 and 40 years in jail. In November 2023, four drug traffickers - Zulkipli Arshad, Wan Yuriilhami Wan Yaacob, Ghazalee Kasim and Mohamad Junaidi Hussin - became the first group of people to have their natural life sentences reduced to 30 years’ imprisonment after a re-sentencing hearing by the Federal Court of Malaysia, which was followed by many more such commutations in the months to come.

==== Singapore ====
In Singapore, before 20 August 1997, the law decreed that life imprisonment is a fixed sentence of 20 years with the possibility of one-third reduction of the sentence (13 years and 4 months) for good behaviour. It was an appeal by Abdul Nasir bin Amer Hamsah on 20 August 1997 that led to the law in Singapore to change the definition of life imprisonment into a sentence that lasts the remainder of the prisoner's natural life, with the possibility of parole after at least 20 years. Abdul Nasir was a convicted robber and kidnapper who was, in two separate High Court trials, sentenced to 18 years' imprisonment and 18 strokes of the cane for robbery with hurt resulting in a female Japanese tourist's death at Oriental Hotel in 1994 and a consecutive sentence of life imprisonment with 12 strokes of the cane for kidnapping two police officers for ransom in 1996, which totalled up to 38 years' imprisonment and 30 strokes of the cane.

Abdul Nasir's appeal for the two sentences to run concurrently led to the Court of Appeal of Singapore, which dismissed Abdul Nasir's appeal, to decide that it would be wrong to consider life imprisonment as a fixed jail term of 20 years and thus changed it to a jail term to be served for the rest of the prisoner's remaining lifespan. The amended definition is applied to future crimes committed after 20 August 1997. Since Abdul Nasir committed the crime of kidnapping and was sentenced before 20 August 1997, his life sentence remained as a prison term of 20 years and thus he still had to serve 38 years behind bars.

The appeal of Abdul Nasir, titled Abdul Nasir bin Amer Hamsah v Public Prosecutor [1997] SGCA 38, was since regarded as a landmark in Singapore's legal history as it changed the definition of life imprisonment from "life" to "natural life" under the law.

== See also ==
- 10-20-Life
- Incapacitation
- Indefinite imprisonment
- Capital punishment by country
