= Hsu Hung-chih =

Taiwanese politician (1937–2018)

- 徐鴻志

Magistrate of Taoyuan County
- In office 20 December 1981 – 20 December 1989
- Preceded by: Yeh Kuo-kuang (acting); Hsu Hsin-liang
- Succeeded by: Liu Pang-yu

Personal details
- Born: 4 January 1937 Shinchiku Prefecture, Taiwan, Empire of Japan
- Died: 28 January 2018 (aged 81)
- Party: Kuomintang
- Education: Soochow University (BA)

Hsu Hung-chih (Chinese: 徐鴻志; pinyin: Xú Hóngzhì; 4 January 1937 – 28 January 2018) was a Taiwanese politician.

He studied economics at Soochow University and became a teacher in Taichung. In 1967, Hsu was first elected to the Taoyuan County Council. He was reelected twice thereafter as a county council member. Hsu became county magistrate in 1981, due to the support of Hokkien-speaking voters in Taoyuan supportive of the Kuomintang. Upon the end of his second term, Hsu was succeeded by Liu Pang-yu, who took office backed by Hakka voters affiliated with the Kuomintang. Hsu died of lung cancer at the age of 81 on 28 January 2018.
