= Life imprisonment in Switzerland =

Life imprisonment in Switzerland is the most severe penalty under Swiss penal law. It may be imposed for murder, genocide, qualified hostage-taking and the act of arranging a war against Switzerland with foreign powers. Under the military penal code, it can also be imposed in times of war for mutiny, disobedience, cowardice, treason and espionage.

Prisoners sentenced to life imprisonment are eligible for parole after having served fifteen years, or ten years in exceptional cases.

In addition to any penalty imposed, criminals may be sentenced to detention if they have committed or attempted an intentional felony, punishable by imprisonment of five years or more, aimed against the life or well-being of other people (such as murder, rape or arson), and if there is a serious concern that they may repeat such offences. The detention is of indefinite duration, but its continued necessity must be examined by the competent authority once per year.

Following a series of murders by recidivists in the 1980s and 1990s, a citizens' committee collected 194,390 signatures to propose a popular initiative that would amend the constitution to mandate the effective incarceration for life of violent criminals and sex offenders considered untreatable. The amendment was adopted by 56% of the popular vote on February 8, 2004, even though it was supported only by the right-wing Swiss People's Party.

It was unsuccessfully opposed by the other major political parties and the government, as well as by legal scholars who argued that mandatory lifetime detention violates the European Convention on Human Rights. The enabling legislation entered into force on 1 August 2008.

== Legal analysis ==
As of 2024, several articles in the Swiss Criminal Code mention a custodial sentence of life (life imprisonment) in some way, shape, or form. All life sentences are discretionary in nature.

- Article 40(2), providing that the maximum term of a custodial sentence is twenty years, except for offenses with a punishment of life.
- Articles 64, 64a, 64b, and 64c (administrative detention).
- Article 86(5) (parole for cases involving life imprisonment).
- Article 97(1)(a), which provides a thirty-year statute of limitations for offenses carrying a life sentence.
- Article 99(1)(a), which provides a thirty-year "statute of sentencing" for offenses carrying a life sentence.
- Article 112, providing for life imprisonment as a punishment for murder where the offender acts in a particularly unscrupulous manner in which the motive, the objective or the method of commission is particularly depraved.
- Article 185(3), which criminalizes "particularly serious cases", including multiple-victims cases, of hostage-taking.
- Article 264(1), which provides for a life sentence or sentence of ten years of imprisonment for the commission of genocide.
- Article 264a(2), which provides for a life sentence for serious "inhumane acts" or crimes against humanity.
- Article 264c(3), which provides for a life sentence for serious violations of the Geneva Conventions in especially grave cases, where the offence affects a number of persons, or where the offender acts in a cruel manner.
- Article 264d(4), which provides for a life sentence for especially serious cases of attacks on civilians and civilian objects.
- Article 264e(2), which provides for a life sentence for unjustified medical treatment, violation of sexual rights and human dignity in especially serious cases, and in particular where the offence affects a number of persons or the offender acts in a cruel manner.
- Article 264f(2), which provides for a life sentence for the recruitment and use of child soldiers in especially serious cases, and in particular where the offence affects a number of children or the offender acts in a cruel manner.
- Article 264g(2), which provides for a life sentence for prohibited methods of war and war crimes in especially serious cases, and in particular where the offence affects a number of persons or the offender acts in a cruel manner.
- Article 264h(2), which provides for a life sentence for especially serious cases of the use of prohibited weapons.
- Article 266(2), which provides for a life sentence for entering into a relationship with the government of a foreign state or its agents with the aim of bringing about a war against the Confederation. Under the article, such acts may be punished with a life sentence in "serious cases".
