= Democratic Pacific Union =

The Democratic Pacific Union is an international non-governmental organization which promotes political democracy, strengthens maritime culture and marine technology, and replaces rigid, aggressive hegemony with the soft powers of love, peace, cooperation and sharing within the Pacific Ocean. The organization was established in Taipei, Republic of China on August 14, 2005, and former Vice President of the Republic of China, Annette Lu is its current chairperson.

== Members ==
Member states are listed alphabetically by continent

Asia

- Republic of China (Taiwan)
- India
- Indonesia
- Japan
- South Korea
- Malaysia
- Philippines
- Russia
- Thailand
- Timor-Leste

Americas

- Canada
- Chile
- Costa Rica
- Dominican Republic
- El Salvador
- Guatemala
- Honduras
- Mexico
- Nicaragua
- Panama
- Paraguay
- Peru
- United States

Oceania
- Australia
- Kiribati
- Marshall Islands
- New Zealand
- Palau
- Solomon Islands
- Tuvalu

Democratic Pacific Union member states shown in green.
