= Life imprisonment in Croatia =

Currently, there is no life imprisonment in Croatia. The Criminal Code prescribes long-time imprisonment - 20 to 50 years - for the most severe criminal offenses. The maximum sentence for a single count is 40 years, while the maximum cumulative sentence is 50 years, even if the sum of sentences for each convicted count exceeds 50 years.

Life imprisonment was introduced in July 2003 but was abolished in 2004 after the Constitutional Court of the Republic of Croatia ruled that the law had been changed without the required two-thirds supermajority in the Croatian Parliament. A subsequent attempt to reintroduce life imprisonment was defeated in the parliamentary procedure.

Some Croatian politicians and law experts still support the introduction of life imprisonment. The opponents argue that long-time imprisonment is a sufficient deterrent and that for many convicted criminals it is essentially equivalent to life imprisonment. As of October 2012, 14 people were sentenced to the then-maximum term of 40 years. In 2026 the government announced plans to introduce a life imprisonment sentence

== Sources ==
- Croatian Parliament (2011-11-07). "Kazneni zakon". Narodne novine (in Croatian) (125/2011).
