= Life imprisonment in Taiwan =

Life imprisonment is one of the five primary punishments stated in the Criminal code of Taiwan. (Note: Article 33) All prisoners sentenced to life imprisonment are also automatically sentenced to deprivation of citizens' rights for life, (Note: Paragraph 1, Article 37) which bars the subject from working as a public servant or running for public office. (Note: Paragraph 2, Article 36) An inmate must serve at least 25 years before being eligible for parole. (Note: Paragraph 1, Article 77)

As with the death penalty, life imprisonment cannot be sentenced to minor offenders (under 18) or elders over 80, and any such cases automatically receive reduced sentences. (Note: Article 63)

Since there are no longer any crimes with mandatory death penalty, as a consequence all crimes punishable by death are also eligible for life imprisonment.

== Crimes with life imprisonment as minimum sentence ==
=== Military law ===
- The following crimes apply only if the offender is a member of the Armed Forces during the time of the act: (Note: Article 3)
  1. Ringleading rebellion through rioting or colluding with foreign entities (Note: Paragraph 1, Article 15)
  2. Disclosing military secrets to enemies (Note: Paragraph 2, Article 20)
  3. Disobeying combat orders at frontline (Note: Paragraph 1, Article 27)
  4. Commander deserting or moving garrisons without order resulting in adversities (Note: Paragraph 2, Article 42)
  5. Disobeying superior orders during wartime (Note: Paragraph 2, Article 47)
  6. Ringleading assault or intimidation against superiors during wartime (Note: Paragraph 2, Article 50)
  7. Unauthorized manufacturing, transporting, or selling of military weapons or ammunition with intent to commit crimes (Note: Paragraph 2, Article 65)
  8. Falsifying military orders during wartime resulting in adversities (Note: Paragraph 2, Article 66)
- The following crimes also apply to civilians during wartime: (Note: Article 2)
  1. Handing over troops, equipment or supplies to enemies (Note: Paragraph 1, Article 17)
  2. Spying for enemies (Note: Paragraph 2, Article 17)
  3. Unauthorized semaphoring or signalling to enemies (Note: Paragraph 3, Article 17)
  4. Aiding enemies in assaulting state military bases (Note: Paragraph 4, Article 17)
  5. Subordinate compelling surrender (Note: Paragraph 5, Article 17)
  6. Stealing or releasing captured aircraft, vessels or captives for enemies (Note: Paragraph 6, Article 17)
  7. Damaging military sites, equipment or supplies during wartime (Note: Paragraph 3, Article 58)

=== Civilian law ===
1. Ringleading rebellion with force (Note: Paragraph 1, Article 100) (Note: A very rare case where the only eligible sentence is life imprisonment; All other crimes on this list are also punishable by death.)
2. Ringleading rebellion through rioting (Note: Paragraph 1, Article 101)
3. Colluding with foreign entities with intent to instigate war against the state (Note: Paragraph 1, Article 103)
4. Colluding with foreign entities with intent to subject state territory to other countries (Note: Paragraph 1, Article 104)
5. Serving in enemy troops or aiding enemies in combating with the state or its allies (Note: Paragraph 1, Article 105)
6. Compelling soldiers to surrender or recruiting for enemies (Note: Subparagraph 2, Paragraph 1, Article 107)
7. Compelling soldiers to abandonment, disorder or desertion (Note: Subparagraph 3, Paragraph 1, Article 107)
8. Aircraft hijacking resulting in death
9. Sexual-assault-murder (Note: Article 226-1)
10. Robbery-murder (Note: Article 332)
11. Piracy-murder (Note: Article 334)
12. Public servant abusing authority to compel drug trafficking (Note: Article 261)
13. Kidnap-murder (Note: Article 348)
14. Murdering the victim after compelling underage prostitution or pornography
15. Manufacturing, transporting, or selling Category one narcotics (Note: Paragraph 1, Article 4)
16. Public servants abusing authority to manufacture, transport, or sell Category two narcotics (Note: Paragraph 1, Article 15)
17. Public servants abusing authority to compel usage of Category one narcotics
18. Unauthorized manufacturing, transporting, selling, lending or renting of firearms or ammunition with intent to commit crimes
19. Ringleading obstruction of conscription with weapons
