= Liu Pang-yu =

Taiwanese politician

- 劉邦友
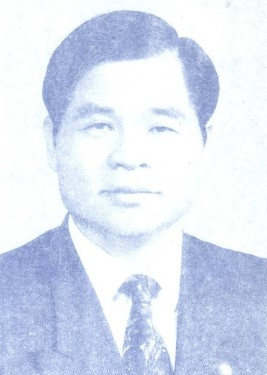

Magistrate of Taoyuan County
- In office 20 December 1989 – 21 November 1996
- Preceded by: Hsu Hung-chih
- Succeeded by: Liao Pen-yang (acting); Annette Lu

Personal details
- Born: 30 November 1942 Chūreki, Shinchiku Prefecture, Japanese Taiwan
- Died: 21 November 1996 (aged 53) Taoyuan County, Taiwan
- Party: Kuomintang
- Spouse: Peng Yu-ying

Liu Pang-yu (Chinese: 劉邦友; pinyin: Liú Bāngyǒu, 30 November 1942 – 21 November 1996) was a Taiwanese politician. He served as the Magistrate of Taoyuan County from 1989 until his death in 1996. Taoyuan County is now Taoyuan City, and the office of the Magistrate is now the office of the Mayor.

== Allegations ==
The Control Yuan indicted Liu due to his role in a corruption case involving the extracting of around $360 million U.S. dollars from the Chungli Farmers' Association. Liu also had been placed under investigation in a separate land speculation deal. Asiaweek reported that some people said that he forged his master's degree. For seven years prosecutors attempted to place Liu in prison.

== Death ==
On November 21, 1996, Liu and seven others died in an "execution style" shooting at his residence. A county councilor survived the incident but suffered serious head injuries, memory loss, and a severed spinal cord.

Police believe that two killers entered the residence in the early morning, surprising the guards, who were about to change shifts. After subduing the guards, the killers took the guards' guns and bullets, rounded up the occupants of the residence, and bound them. After blindfolding the victims and forcing them to kneel, the killers shot them in their heads. The killers stole a car from one of the victims (Chuang Shun-hsing); a secretary (Liang Mei-chiao) was still in the car, but she was left at the base of Hutou Mountain, where the killers stopped to rendezvous with their accomplices and abandon the stolen car.

=== Residence occupants ===
- Liu Pang-yu (劉邦友; Liú Bāngyǒu), Taoyuan County Commissioner (killed).
- Chuang Shun-hsing (莊順興; Zhuāng Shùnxìng), County Assemblyman (killed). His car was stolen as the getaway vehicle.
- Hsu Chun-kuo (徐春國; Xú Chūnguó), confidential secretary to the county government (killed).
- Liu Pang-ming (劉邦明; Liú Bāngmíng), driver for the commissioner (killed).
- Chang Tao-mei (張桃妹; Zhāng Táomèi), wife of the chief of the County Bureau of Agriculture (killed).
- Liu Ju-mei (劉如梅; Liú Rúméi), a maid or a cook (killed).
- Liu Pang-liang (劉邦亮; Liú Bāngliàng), a guard (killed).
- Liu Ming-chi (劉明吉; Liú Míngjí), a guard (killed).
- Teng Wen-chang (鄧文昌; Dèng Wénchāng), County Assemblyman (survived with injuries).
- Liang Mei-chiao (梁美嬌; Liáng Měijiāo), Teng's secretary (survived unhurt).
- Judy, a foreign maid (survived).
- Peng Yu-ying (彭玉英; Péng Yùyīng), Liu's wife (survived unhurt).

=== Investigations and theories ===
Authorities have not solved the crime; some Taiwanese police believe that Chinese gang members recruited by "a local group" killed Liu and the others. Some investigators believe that "conflicts of interest" in Liu's politics led to his death. Others believe that Liu's guards may have been involved in gambling.

One of the key suspects in Liu's murder, Yang Shih-kang (楊世剛; Yáng Shìgāng) escaped police custody in 1999. He had a history of abducting politicians and smuggling weapons, which led police to suspect him for Liu's murder. Yang was initially arrested in 1999 after returning to Taiwan; while under police escort to locate his hidden weapon caches, Yang overpowered his escort and escaped with the help of accomplices. Yang was later detained in 2003 in Xiamen on an unrelated robbery charge.

The statute of limitations ran out in 2016, closing the case, which prompted some DPP lawmakers to propose the removal of the twenty-year statute for murder cases and major economic crimes.

=== Impact ===
At the time the shooting was the deadliest mass murder in Taiwanese history, and Liu was the only high-ranking government official to be assassinated in his term. The nature of the shootings and the photographs of the aftermath shocked the Taiwanese.

A special by-election was held on 15 March 1997 to fill the vacant office of Taoyuan County Magistrate; Annette Lu of the Democratic Progressive Party (DPP) was elected, defeating Kuomintang (KMT) candidate Fang Li-hsiu and breaking the KMT hold on the office. The execution-style slaying of Liu was thought to have revealed governmental corruption, which was cited as one reason Lu won, despite pre-election polls predicting a KMT victory.

Liu's death, along with two later well-publicized murder cases, led to mass demonstrations in May 1997. Demonstrators marched on 4 May 1997 and 18 May 1997, demanding Premier Lien Chan's resignation over the perceived rise in violent crime as evidenced by the then-unsolved murders of Pai Hsiao-yen, Peng Wan-ru, and Liu Pang-yu.

== See also ==
- Peng Wan-ru
- Murder of Pai Hsiao-yen
