= Annette Lu =

Taiwanese politician (born 1944)

Lu Hsiu-lien
- 呂秀蓮
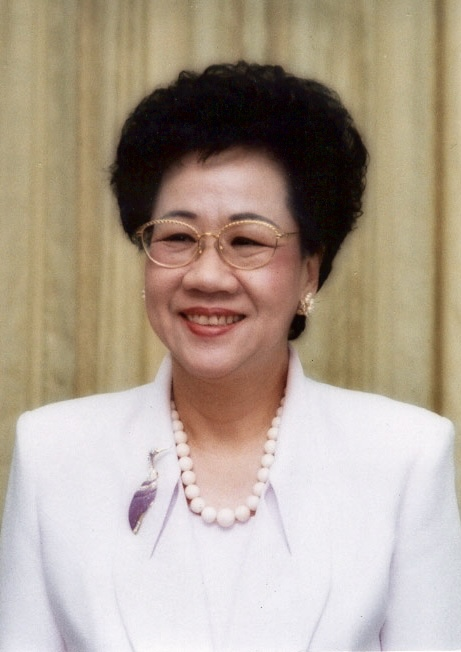
- Official portrait, 2005

8th Vice President of the Republic of China
- In office 20 May 2000 – 20 May 2008
- President: Chen Shui-bian
- Preceded by: Lien Chan
- Succeeded by: Vincent Siew

Chair of Democratic Progressive Party
- Acting; 8 December 2005 – 15 January 2006
- Preceded by: Su Tseng-chang
- Succeeded by: Yu Shyi-kun

10th Magistrate of Taoyuan
- In office 28 March 1997 – 20 May 2000
- Preceded by: Liau Pen-yang (acting); Liu Pang-yu
- Succeeded by: Hsu Ying-shen (acting); Eric Chu

Member of the Legislative Yuan
- In office 1 February 1993 – 31 January 1996
- Constituency: Taoyuan County constituency

Personal details
- Born: 7 June 1944 (age 82) Tōen Town, Shinchiku Prefecture, Japanese Taiwan (now Taoyuan District, Taoyuan City, Taiwan)
- Party: Democratic Progressive Party (after 1986)
- Other political affiliations: Formosa Alliance (after 2018)
- Education: National Taiwan University (LLB); University of Illinois Urbana-Champaign (LLM); Harvard University (LLM)

Annette Lu
- Traditional Chinese: 呂秀蓮
Transcriptions
Standard Mandarin
- Hanyu Pinyin: Lǚ Xiùlián
- Wade–Giles: Lü³ Hsiu⁴-lien²
Southern Min
- Hokkien POJ: Lū Siù-liân

Lu Hsiu-lien (Chinese: 呂秀蓮; pinyin: Lǚ Xiùlián; Pe̍h-ōe-jī: Lū Siù-liân; born 7 June 1944), also known by her English name Annette, is a Taiwanese politician and lawyer. A feminist active in the Tangwai movement, she joined the Democratic Progressive Party (DPP) in 1990 and was elected to the Legislative Yuan in 1992. Subsequently, she served as Taoyuan County Magistrate between 1997 and 2000, and was vice president of the Republic of China (Taiwan) from 2000 to 2008, under President Chen Shui-bian.

Before entering politics, Lu graduated from National Taiwan University and earned law degrees from the University of Illinois Urbana-Champaign and from Harvard University. She announced her intentions to run for the presidency on 6 March 2007, but withdrew to support eventual DPP nominee Frank Hsieh. Lu ran again in 2012, but withdrew for a second time, ceding the nomination to DPP chairwoman Tsai Ing-wen.

Lu lost the DPP's Taipei mayoral nomination to Pasuya Yao in 2018, and stated that she would leave the party. However, by the time Lu announced in September 2019 that she would contest the 2020 presidential election on behalf of the Formosa Alliance, she was still a member of the Democratic Progressive Party.

== Early life and education ==
Lu was born on June 7, 1944, in Tōen Town (now Taoyuan City) during Japanese rule. She has both Hoklo and Hakka ancestry, with her paternal ancestor arriving in Taiwan from Nanjing County, Zhangzhou, Fujian in 1740. She has one older brother, Lu Chuan-seng, and three older sisters; her older brother became a local lawyer and her three sisters became housewives. Their ancestral home is in Fujian.

After graduating from Taipei First Girls' High School, Lu sat the competitive law school college entrance examinations and, after placing first on the exam in 1963, was admitted to attend law school at National Taiwan University. After graduating with an LL.B. in 1967, she won a scholarship to complete graduate studies in the United States. She earned a Master of Laws (LL.M.) from the University of Illinois Urbana-Champaign in comparative law in 1971 and a second LL.M. from Harvard Law School, where she was a student of professor Jerome Cohen, in 1978. As a graduate student at Harvard, Lu was classmates with future Taiwanese president Ma Ying-jeou.

== Rise in politics ==
During the 1970s, Lu established herself as a prominent feminist advocate in Taiwan, which included writing for New Feminism or Xin Nüxing Zhuyi (新女性主義). She renounced her KMT membership, joined the tangwai movement, and worked on the staff of Formosa Magazine. Lu then became increasingly active in the movement, calling for democracy and an end to authoritarian rule.

In 1979, Lu delivered a 20-minute speech criticizing the government at an International Human Rights Day rally that later became known as the Kaohsiung Incident. Following this rally, virtually the entire leadership of Taiwan's democracy movement, including Lu, was imprisoned. She was tried, found guilty of violent sedition, and sentenced by a military court to 12 years in prison. She was named by Amnesty International as a prisoner of conscience, and, due to international pressure, coupled with the work of Ma Ying-jeou and Jerome A. Cohen, was released in 1985, after approximately five and a half years in jail.

In the 1990s, Lu worked to have Taiwan reenter the United Nations, not under the name "Republic of China" but as "Taiwan".

=== Elected offices ===
Lu joined the Democratic Progressive Party in November 1990, and was elected to the Legislative Yuan in 1992. In 1997, she won an election to be the Magistrate of her hometown of Taoyuan, a post she held until Chen Shui-bian selected her as his running mate in the 2000 presidential elections.

== Novel ==
Lu completed her novel entitled These Three Women while in prison. To evade the surveillance of the detention facility, she wrote part of the novel on toilet paper using a washbasin as a desk. In 2008, the novel was adapted into a screenplay for TV drama of the same name. The drama was broadcast on 24 November 2008 on the Chinese Television System.

== Vice-presidency, 2000–2008 ==
On 18 March 2000, Lu was elected vice president. She was awarded the World Peace Corps Mission's World Peace Prize in 2001. Controversy erupted over this in Taiwan, with Lu's political opponents accusing her of vastly overstating the significance and value of that award. She was also the ROC's first elected vice president to adopt a Western first name. In her interview with TIME Asia Magazine, she said the KMT never thought they would transfer their regime to her on behalf of the freedom fighters.

Lu was a contender for the 2008 presidential election; she announced her candidacy on March 6 and faced Yu Shyi-kun, Frank Hsieh, and Su Tseng-chang for the nomination. After receiving only 6.16% of the votes cast in the DPP primary, Lu withdrew from the race.

=== Assassination attempt ===
On 19 March 2004, Lu was shot in the right kneecap while campaigning in Tainan. Chen was shot in the abdomen at the same event. Both survived the shooting and left Chi-mei Hospital on the same day. The Pan-Blue Coalition suggested that the shooting was not an assassination attempt but that it was staged as a self-inflicted wound in order to gain sympathy votes. The Chen/Lu ticket won the election on the following day with a 0.228% margin, a figure significant to those who related it to the assassination incident.

=== Controversy ===
In 2004, Lu stressed that the mountain and rivers in central Taiwan have been overcultivated, and the entire area needs rest; she suggested that Taiwanese, including Indigenous people, could move to Taiwan allies in Latin America to build new careers and help develop land resources in those countries. She also claimed that Aboriginal people are not Taiwan's original inhabitants. These comments have led to her being accused of Han-centered "racist" by some, including Indigenous people.

== Later political career ==
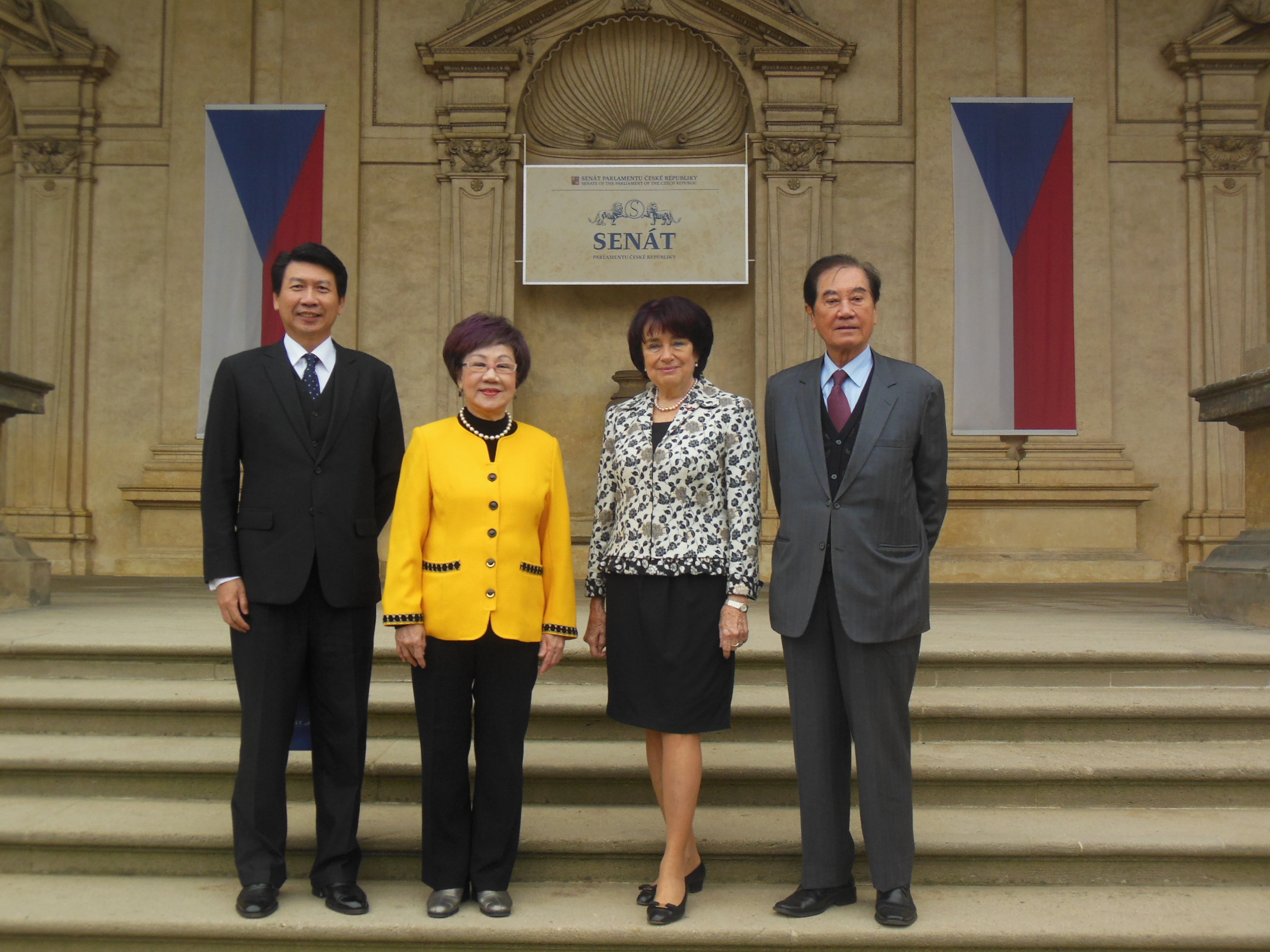
Lu with Ambassador Joey Wang, Senator Eva Syková and Mark Chen during the 2016 Forum 2000 conference in Prague.

Lu announced in March 2018 that she would contest the Democratic Progressive Party mayoral primary for Taipei. Soon after the DPP nominated Pasuya Yao as its candidate, Lu stated her intention to leave the party.

She remained a DPP member through 2019, and announced in September 2019 that she would contest the 2020 presidential election on behalf of the Formosa Alliance, with Peng Pai-hsien as her running mate. On 2 November 2019, Lu suspended her presidential campaign.

== Cross-strait relations ==
In terms of Cross-Strait relations with China, Lu has been more outspoken in favor of Taiwan independence than President Chen Shui-bian, and as such has been more heavily attacked than Chen both by the government of the People's Republic of China and by supporters of Chinese unification. Her remarks have led state newspapers in mainland China to accuse her of provoking "animosity between the people on both sides of the Taiwan Straits". PRC state media has also labeled Lu as "insane" and as "scum of the earth".

In 2010 Lu visited South Korea and advocated Taiwan's use of what she called "soft power," meaning peaceful economic and political development, as a model for the resolution of international conflicts. In mid-April 2013 speaking at George Washington University, Lu called for the DPP to better understand Mainland China, because Taiwan's future depends on development on the mainland. She stated that cross-strait relations should be defined as not only between distant relatives, but between near neighbors. She also stressed that there should be neither hatred nor war between Taiwan and Mainland China, and that both sides should pursue peaceful coexistence, industrial cooperation, and cultural exchanges.

Speaking at the founding ceremony of Anti-One China Principle Union in Taipei on 29 April 2013, Lu warned against silent annexation of Taiwan by China since the introduction of Anti-Secession Law in 2005 and the gradual erosion of Taiwan's sovereignty. However, she said Taiwan is not opposed to one China existing in the world, just that Taiwan is not part of China. She criticized ROC President Ma Ying-jeou for making Taiwan more and more dependent on China. She reiterated her 1996 Consensus (in opposition to the Kuomintang's 1992 Consensus) for dealing with the PRC, in which she said Taiwan has been an independent sovereign country since the 1996 ROC presidential election.

== Corruption charges and acquittal ==
On September 21, 2007, Lu, along with DPP chairman Yu Shyi-Kun and National Security Office secretary-general Mark Chen, were separately indicted on charges of corruption by the Supreme Prosecutor's Office of Taiwan. Lu was accused of embezzlement and special fund abuse of about US$165,000. On July 2, 2012, all three were acquitted of all charges.

== See also ==
- Politics of the Republic of China
- Democratic Pacific Union

Political offices
Preceded by Liau Pen-yang; Acting	Magistrate of Taoyuan County; 1997–2000	Succeeded by Hsu Ying-shen; Acting
Preceded by Lien Chan	Vice President of the Republic of China; 2000–2008	Succeeded by Vincent Siew
Party political offices
Preceded by Frank Hsieh	DPP nominee for Vice President of the Republic of China; 2000, 2004	Succeeded by Su Tseng-chang
Preceded by Su Tseng-chang	Chairperson of the Democratic Progressive Party (acting); 2005–2006	Succeeded by Yu Shyi-kun
