= Alexander family hostage crisis =

1997 crime in Taiwan

On the evening of 18 November 1997, South African military attaché Colonel Edward McGill Alexander and his family were taken hostage for approximately twenty-one hours by wanted fugitive Chen Chin-hsing (陳進興; Chén Jìnxīng) in their home in Taipei, Taiwan. Chen forcibly entered the Alexanders' home at approximately 7:00 pm (Taiwan time) that evening. Chen was captured the following day and executed roughly two years later.

== Background ==
Chen Chin-hsing had been involved in the murder of Pai Hsiao-yen, the daughter of famed Taiwanese actress Pai Bing-bing and Japanese manga creator Ikki Kajiwara. His wife and two other relatives were imprisoned for their alleged involvement in the murder while he was on the run.

== Incident ==
At approximately 7:00 pm Taiwan time, Chen Chin-hsing forcefully entered the Alexander house via the garage. Upon entry, the first person he encountered was McGill's twelve-year-old daughter, Christine, who was playing the piano at the time. Chen put his arm around Christine's neck, and forced her to walk upstairs to where the rest of the family was located. Once upstairs, Chen instructed Melanie, another daughter of McGill, at gunpoint to call CNN. Melanie called her friend Michael, who worked at CNN, and within an hour, the media was alerted to the situation and police officers surrounded the house.

As police surrounded the house, reports indicate that they taunted Chen. Despite repeated warnings from Chen to stay away, the police advanced towards the house, prompting Chen to open fire with one of his guns while keeping the other pointed at Melanie, whom he had been using as a human shield. After repeated pleading by McGill, Chen released Melanie and took McGill as a human shield instead. At this point, police had already entered the house through the garage door. Chen fired shots at the police as they rushed up the stairs towards him, causing them to retreat to the garage. While firing at the police, one of Chen's shots went through Melanie's wrist and into her back, where it lodged between two arteries in her pelvis. Additionally, McGill was shot in the leg.

=== Negotiations ===
Chen had promised to release the hostages if Frank Hsieh, a renowned politician (who later became premier), personally negotiated the release of his wife and brother-in-law, at the time sentenced to 12 years and life in prison, respectively. At 9:00 pm Taiwan time, Hsieh arrived, and negotiations started at 10:00. These negotiations were successful in securing the release of McGill and Melanie for treatment of their sustained injuries. Police also brought Chen's wife to the house on the morning of 19 November to help mediate. Further negotiations resulted in the release of the family's foster son and Christine. McGill's wife Anne was the last hostage released by Chen. Her release on 19 November brought an end to the crisis, and the police announced the conclusion of the crisis at 4:00 pm.

=== Capture and execution of Chen ===
After the hostages were released, police seized Chen. Chen was found guilty on charges including sexual assault, kidnapping, and murder and executed on 6 October 1999.

== Aftermath ==
After the incident, the Alexanders publicly forgave Chen before his execution. As a result of the crisis, Taiwanese police developed improved tactics to deal with hostage situations. McGill Alexander wrote a book about the event entitled Hostage in Taipei, which was published by Cladach Publishing in 2000. The following year, it was translated into Chinese as True Love and published by Cosmax.
