= Peng Wan-ru =

Taiwanese politician

- Chinese: 彭婉如
- Hanyu Pinyin: Péng Wǎnrú
- Wade–Giles: P'eng Wan-ju
- Hokkien POJ: Phêⁿ Oán-jû
- Born: 13 July 1949
- Died: 30 November 1996 (aged 47); Kaohsiung County, Taiwan
- Cause of death: Assassination by stabbing
- Body discovered: Kaohsiung County
- Political party: Democratic Progressive Party
- Spouse: Horng Wann-sheng
- Children: 1

Peng Wan-ru (Chinese: 彭婉如; 13 July 1949 – 30 November 1996), also spelled Peng Wan-ju, was a feminist Taiwanese politician. The director of the Democratic Progressive Party's (DPP) Women's Affairs Department, Peng advocated for the safety and development of women.

== Personal life ==
Peng married Horng Wann-sheng (洪萬生; Hóng Wànshēng, a mathematics professor at NTNU) and they had a son together.

== Assassination and aftermath ==
In November 1996, Peng disappeared in Kaohsiung, Taiwan; the public last saw her board a yellow Ford Telstar taxi after a DPP meeting the night prior to a DPP convention. She was discovered raped and murdered outside of an abandoned warehouse in Kaohsiung County (now part of Kaohsiung City); her body had more than 30 stab wounds.

Despite an extensive investigation, the police were unable to solve the crime. At least 70,000 Taiwanese taxi drivers had their fingerprints analyzed in an effort to find Peng's killer. Horng said that he felt frustrated that the killer was not found. There have been numerous false leads since the murder.

In 2015, police received tips from the ex-girlfriend of a taxi driver surnamed Yang, who said that he had told her he had killed Peng. Although Yang did not match DNA samples taken from the crime scene, he did match several fingerprint characteristics.

The statute of limitations ran out in 2016, closing the case, which prompted some DPP lawmakers to propose the removal of the twenty-year statute for murder cases and major economic crimes.

=== Response and legacy ===
Peng's murder produced an outcry against the lack of protection women have in Taiwan. Peng's proposed quota for one-fourth of the seats of the elected seats to be reserved for women passed during the November 30, 1996 DPP National Congress meeting; the public believes that Peng died during that day.

Peng's death, along with two other well-publicized murder cases, led to mass demonstrations in May 1997. Demonstrators marched on 4 May 1997 and 18 May 1997, demanding Premier Lien Chan's resignation over the perceived rise in violent crime as evidenced by the then-unsolved murders of Pai Hsiao-yen, Peng Wan-ru, and Liu Pang-yu. On 24 June 1998, Taiwan passed Asia's first laws regarding domestic violence, due in part to Peng's death and the case of Teng Ju-wen, who murdered her husband in October 1993, following years of abuse.

The Peng Wan-ru Foundation (彭婉如基金會; Péng Wǎnrú Jījīnhuì), an organization named after Peng and established in 1997 by Peng's husband, supports women wishing to enter the labour force. It trains women for participation in their child-care programs; once they have passed the courses, the Foundation matches them with households or elementary schools in need of child care. On the 29th anniversary of her death, the Democratic Progressive Party announced that A Journey in Search of Wan-ru’s Footsteps, a documentary about Peng's life, had begun filming.
