= Crime in Taiwan =

Crime in Taiwan ranges from food adulteration, bombing, assassination attempts, hostage crisis, murder etc. However, crime statistics show that crime rates in Taiwan are among the lowest in the world, and are relatively low compared to much of the developed world. A 2020 report named Taiwan the second-safest country in the world, based on low crime rates and a high number of survey respondents who indicated that they felt safe walking alone at night.

== Law enforcement agencies ==
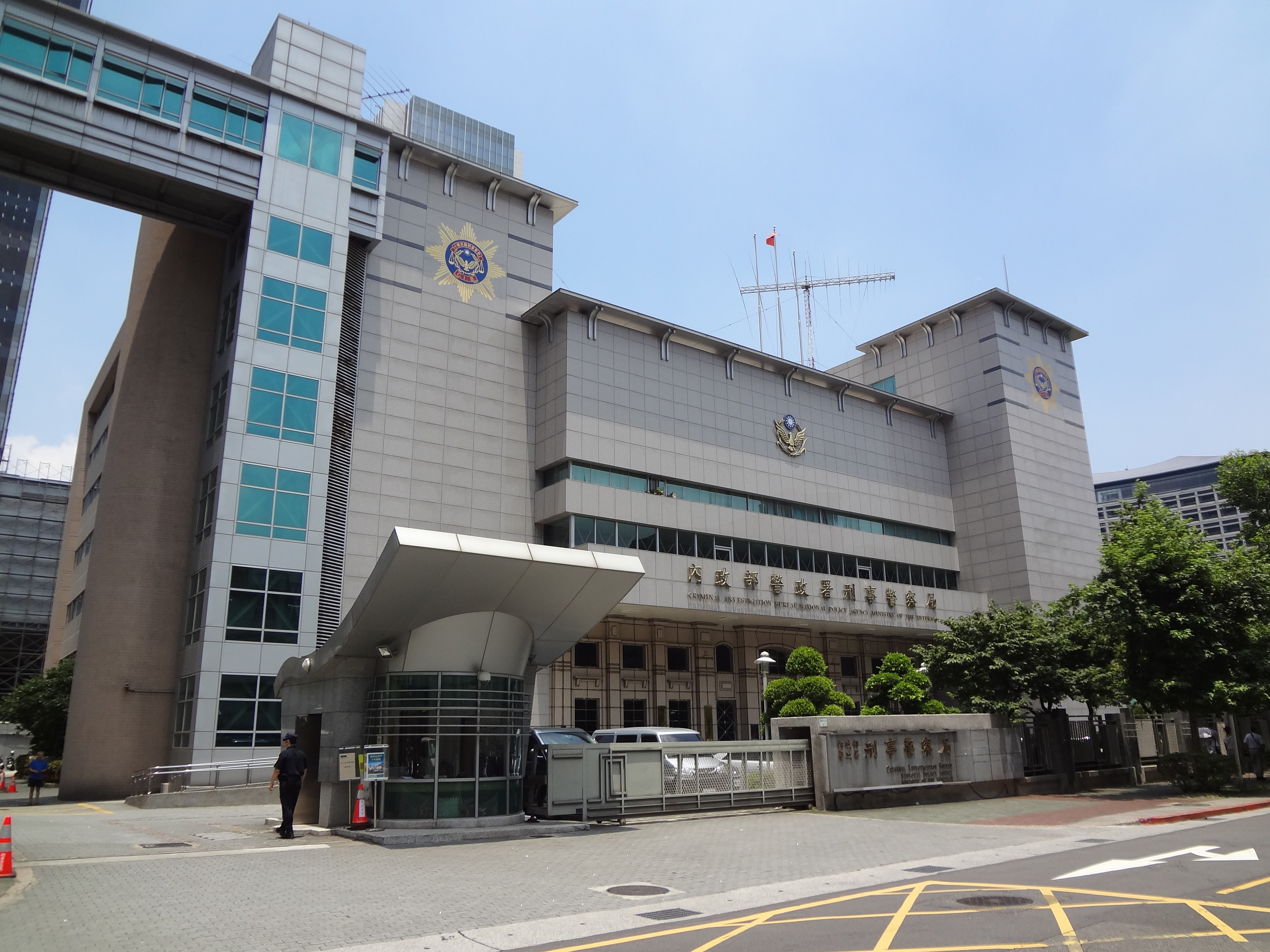
Criminal Investigation Bureau

The National Police Agency is the top law enforcement body in Taiwan with its subordinate Criminal Investigation Bureau.

== List of notable crimes ==
=== Assassination attempts ===
- President Chen Shui-bian and Vice President Annette Lu assassination attempt on 19 March 2004
- Presidential Office Building Truck Attack on 25 January 2014

=== Bombing ===
- Taiwan McDonald's bombings on 28-29 April 1992

=== Hostage crisis ===
- Alexander family hostage crisis on 18 November 1997

=== Murder ===
- Nantou shooting on 21 September 1959
- Murder of Peng Wan-ru on 30 November 1996
- Murder of Pai Hsiao-yen on 20 April 1997
- Murder of Weng Chi-nan on 28 May 2010
- Taipei Metro attack on 21 May 2014
- Taipei Metro attack on 19 December 2025

== Illegal drugs ==
=== Marijuana ===
Marijuana is criminalized in Taiwan with strict penalties for possession, production, and distribution.

== Forced labor ==
=== Fishing industry ===
Taiwan's overseas fishing fleet has been criticized for a history of abuse and a lack of protection for migrant laborers, often from Southeast Asia. Official Taiwanese sources put the number of foreign workers aboard Taiwanese vessels at 26,000 but NGOs and US government agencies put the figure around 160,000. Foreign fishermen frequently report non-payment, long work hours, and verbal and physical abuse at the hands of their captains and officers, who are often Taiwanese. In recent years Taiwan has made significant progress on the issue, but abuse remains widespread. In terms of human rights the distant waters fishing fleet lags far behind the rest of Taiwanese industry.

A 2020 Greenpeace investigation found Taiwanese vessels in the Atlantic Ocean engaged in illegal, unreported and unregulated fishing. They also found significant evidence of the abuse of foreign laborers. They also documented Taiwanese fishing companies using flags of convenience to obscure vessel ownership as well as unreported at sea transfers of fish. Taiwanese fisheries conglomerate FCF was specifically singled out for criticism for links to illegal fishing and forced labor.

In October 2020 the US Department of Labor added the Taiwanese distant waters fleet's products to its list of goods produced by child or forced labor. In May 2021 the Control Yuan ordered the Ministry of Foreign Affairs, the Ministry of Labor, and the Fisheries Agency to address the issue and heavily criticized their lack of action.

== See also ==
- Food safety incidents in Taiwan
- Organized crime in Taiwan
- Crime in Taipei
