= China Gate (novel) =

1983 novel by William Arnold

- Author: William Arnold
- Publisher: Random House
- Publication date: 1983
- Publication place: United States
- Pages: 429
- ISBN: 0-394-53373-9

China Gate is a 1983 crime fiction novel by William Arnold that tells the story of modern Taiwan as an epic Chinese-American gangster saga. It was acquired by editor-publisher Marc Jaffe of Ballantine Books for what at the time was one of the highest first-novel advances on record, and was the inaugural fiction offering of Random House’s new imprint, Villard Books. It was simultaneously published in the U.K. by Macdonald/Futura and Brazil by Editora Record.

Based loosely on Arnold's high school years spent in the Far East, China Gate traces a large cast of American and Chinese characters on Taiwan from the fall of the Mainland in 1949 to its U.S. diplomatic recognition in 1979. Arnold’s agent, Russell Galen of the Scott Meredith Literary Agency, described the novel in a pre-publication interview as the "Taiwanese Godfather".

== Plot ==
The protagonist is Bryan Whyte, who in the novel’s 1949 prologue has been ripped from his home in Shanghai and deposited on the island of Taiwan—a five year-old refugee from the fall of China to Communism. His father was formerly taipan of the Chinese movie industry but he’s lost his fortune and been left addled by a bomb that also killed the boy’s mother. Father-and-son Whyte are accompanied by King Lu, head of the Ching Pang or Green Society, once the elder Whyte’s business partner and now—since the soothsayers of this powerful underworld association believe the boy will play an important role in the recovery of the Mainland—the younger Whyte’s secret protector.

Book One (1961-1964) – Twelve years later, Bryan Whyte is an enterprising and streetwise seventeen-year-old who has turned his circle of childhood best friends into a “fraternity”—the Omega Chi—that holds hegemony over the other teenage gangs of the Taipei American School and serves as the U.S. authority’s go-between with the Taipei underworld. But in 1961 this status quo is challenged by another teenage gang, the Warlords, made up mostly of Asian and Eurasian students at the school. When the Warlords attack the Omega Chi’s black market operations and form an alliance with an adult Taiwanese gang, the Tiger Eels, Whyte is forced to ask for help from King Lu and the Chinese Green Society, now headquartered in Hong Kong. An ethnic gang war breaks out in Taipei that Whyte ultimately manages to end by convincing the U.S. and Nationalist Chinese military police to join the Greens in an all-out effort to crush the upstart Warlords and Tiger Eels.

Book Two (1965-1970) – As peace reigns once again in Taipei, Whyte is free to finally journey to America, the homeland he has always idolized but never experienced, for college. But he is soon disillusioned by its reality and, with the buildup of the Vietnam War and his own generation’s rejection of it, he returns to Taiwan intent on converting the old Omega Chi into an export-import business and using his unique connections with the Asian underworld to aid the U.S. war effort. As the Vietnam conflict escalates, its economic impact allows him to build a business and criminal empire that stretches throughout Southeast Asia. As the war fails, so does Whyte’s character and he’s increasingly forced into expedient and unconscionable acts to protect his empire. One by one his friends are taken by the war or the counterculture, and his old rivals, the Warlords (who have also thrived off the war) chip away at his power and then move against him by manipulating an insider into helping them plant a bomb in Whyte’s estate, China Gate.

Book Three (1971-1979) – The bombing on China Gate leaves Whyte physically and emotionally crippled, and the last nails in his coffin seem to come with the United Nations rejection of Taiwan as the one true China in 1972 and the U.S. pull-out from Vietnam in 1974. But he survives as a business entity off the surprise international success of his film studio’s cycle of kung fu movies, and he rallies the business community of Taiwan into resisting its fate with a strategy of making the island such a bastion of democratic and economic success that the U.S. can never abandon it. In the ensuing years Whyte helps guide the Taiwanese economy to dazzling heights and transforms the Omega Chi Company into a transnational conglomerate with immense power in Taiwan and the Pacific Rim. But as the decade of the 1970s comes to a close with the resurgent Warlords threatening his existence, and Taiwan’s existence threatened by the surprise U.S. decision to formally recognize Communist China and abandon its diplomatic ties to Taiwan, Bryan Whyte has to find a way for them both to survive.

== Reception ==
=== Critical reaction ===
Random House proclaimed the novel a "blockbuster" in a full-page announcement in Time magazine, and it made numerous West-coast bestseller lists in the fall of 1983 (in hardback), and in the summer of 1984 (in paperback), reaching as high as No. 2, but never attained the number-one spot.

The main reviews of China Gate were positive, but with caveats. John Jay Osborne Jr. in the New York Times Book Review wrote that the novel "powers along nicely and... as long as Mr. Arnold sticks to the action, the novel is a success". Jay Mathews in the Washington Post reported that "Arnold... constructs his plot well", and "provides the requisite sex and violence of another Tai-Pan," but predicted that Asia hands would be unable to "suspend disbelief long enough" to accept certain aspects of its plot. Salli Stevenson in the Los Angeles Times pronounced it "a fast-paced, entertaining and sometimes preposterous novel centered on ideological conflicts of 20th Century Southeast Asia".

Other reviewers were less equivocal in their praise. Publishers Weekly found the book "fascinating... gripping reading", and the Pensacola Journal declared it "totally engrossing". The Portland Oregonian reported that "Despite its eccentricities, China Gate is a sharply plotted and crisply executed tale of international intrigue... a crackling yarn". Alice E. Gerard in Best Sellers wrote: "The pace of China Gate never slackens. It is extremely suspenseful and filled with action and intrigue... a well-written, exciting novel".

The novel also drew specific praise for its evocation of time and place. The Ocala Star-Banner observed that "It's not often that someone writes about Taiwan and the intricacies of that society. Arnold has done it with skill and feeling". The Erie Times-News called it a "page-turner" that "captures the dazzling, exotic world which exists in this corner of the Orient—its wealth and poverty, its violence, beauty and chaos, its volatile mix of Asian and American influence". David Grindle in the University of Georgia’s The Red and Black concluded his mixed review saying, "It is obvious that Arnold has lived in Taiwan and knows the area inside out. He brings out the beautiful and decadent Orient on every page".

=== Political slant ===
There was some controversy and disagreement among reviewers about the novel's politics. The New York Times had problems with its "superreactionary tone" and its conservative "pontificating", and Dan Webster in the Spokane Spokesman-Review saw it as a "right-wing diatribe that must have Ayn Rand dancing in her grave". But the American Library Association’s Booklist found it "notable not only for what it reveals about America's true role in the Orient, but also for Arnold's chilling vision of the ultimate disregard for human life that can grow from the capitalist spirit". David Grindle saw the protagonist’s "transition to ruthless big-time corporate businessman" as "by far the most critical examination of Asian capitalism that exists in the genre of historical novels, especially when it describes the intricate and interwoven status of the Chinese underworld".

Larry Rumley in the Seattle Times also considered its political viewpoint to be a bit more balanced. He praised the book as a "gut-busting... tale of murder and mayhem, of political chicanery and survival at the highest levels, of Central Intelligence Agency manipulation, of personal ambitions, of the Vietnam War and of the frightening impact of the drug trade on the world generally and the United States specifically. Also, it is a primer on capitalism, its development, its benefits and some of its problems, with Bryan Whyte Jr. a foremost defender of it".

In a Q&A with Arnold in the Los Angeles Herald-Examiner Alex Ben Block put it to him directly: "Some people are saying that China Gate is a right-wing book. Others say it's a left-wing book." Which was correct? Arnold responded that the novel, unlike its main character, doesn't have a specific political orientation. In his mind, it was indeed a celebration of Taiwan as America's "one great success story in Asia", but also "a tragedy of the human cost that went with it".

=== Factual accuracy ===
China Gate opens with a disclaimer that the novel is fiction but so many of its elements were close to Arnold's own life and experiences in Asia that reviewers speculated on how much of it was drawn from fact. Robert Lindstrom in the Portland Oregonian wrote that "Arnold's firsthand knowledge of Taiwanese life gives China Gate an impressive authenticity...", and "though fiction... truth is ever present in its plot..."; and with its "connection between Chinese organized crime and American politics in the Far East", unfolding "on a large and believable scale over thirty years", the novel cannot help but establish "a tantalizing touch of exposé".

The Richmond Times-Dispatch also thought the novel had to be more than make-believe, saying: "Arnold insists that his novel is a work of the imagination, not a roman à clef. But his portrayal of Taipei reeks of reality; the reader can see it, hear it, smell it, shudder at it, be fascinated by it". In a profile of Arnold in the Seattle Post-Intelligencer ("Writer Arnold Lived his Novel"), he once again stressed that China Gate was fiction but this time admitted that "almost everything in the book happened to someone... at one time or another".

== Legacy ==
=== Abandoned film project ===
The film rights of China Gate were sold to producers Charles Roven and Bob Cavallo for Carolco Pictures/TriStar Pictures, and the film went into production in the early 1990s with a script by Ronald Bass, and Luis Mandoki directing. The project was abruptly terminated by the studio after the company had begun filming on location in Taiwan, and more than a million dollars had been spent, possibly due to last-minute obstacles put up by the Nationalist Chinese Government, which, according to the Los Angeles Herald-Examiner, was "unhappy" with the project from the beginning because "the book seems to suggest that gangsters were behind Chiang Kai-shek".

=== Impact ===
A decade after the novel's publication, Hal Piper, former Moscow bureau chief for the Baltimore Sun and a distant in-law of Arnold, referenced it in a column titled "Prophets With Honor," about three books he'd read years before that had come back to him as being unusually prophetic. "What (China Gate) is about... is the reconquest of Communist China" (by capitalism). "When I read the book nearly 10 years ago, it sounded too pat. I suppose I expected communism to collapse in China as it had in Russia, tumultuously. But the sellout to capitalism is exactly what is happening in China today. My wife’s Cousin Bill, the prophet, knew it long ago".

== See also ==
- The Foreigner (novel)
- List of abandoned and unfinished films
- Organized crime in Taiwan
