= Law enforcement in Taiwan =

Law enforcement in Taiwan (officially the Republic of China) operates primarily through governmental police agencies.

== History ==
The current police service in Taiwan traces its roots back to police forces established in Taiwan during Japanese colonial rule, as well as police services established in mainland China during the early 20th century.

=== Japanese colonial period ===
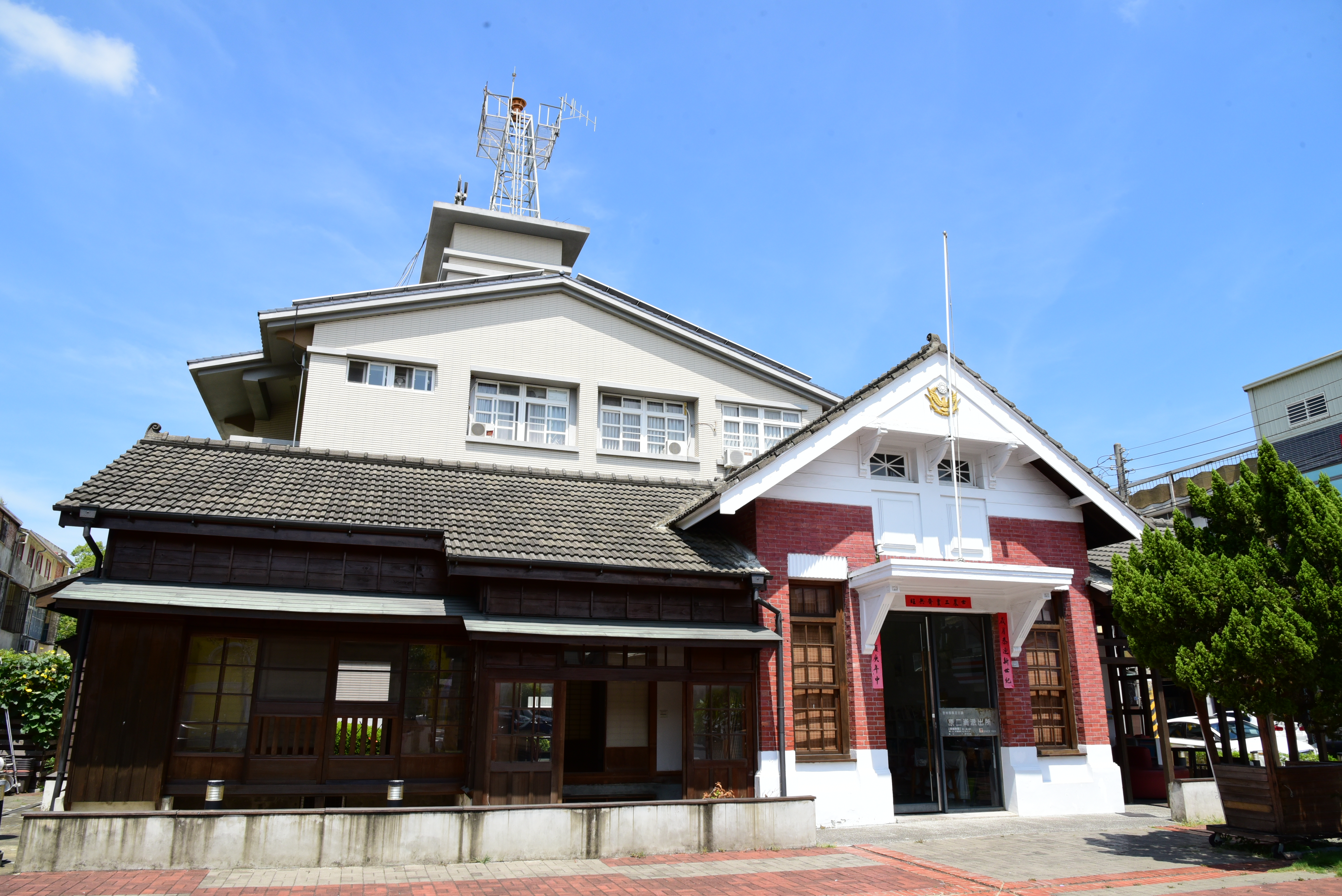
A restored Japanese colonial era police station.

The first formal police forces in Taiwan were organized by the Japanese Colonial Government which oversaw Taiwan between 1895 and 1945. In the early years of Japanese rule, rebellions were common especially in rural areas. With the passage of the "Bandit Laws", police forces as well as garrison units from the Japanese military were tasked with suppression of rebels, though large scale rebellions had largely died out by 1902. Military and police forces were also involved in the efforts of the colonial government to secure control over the mountainous regions of Taiwan from the Taiwanese aborigines around 1910, and a series of smaller attempted rebellions and civil disorders between 1912 and 1916. With the gradual acceptance of Japanese rule sinking in among the general populace by the 1920s, most agitators turned to seeking political change and reform within the established system in the home rule movement, Secret police forces were tasked with keeping a close watch on political groups and agitators. In 1920, Taiwanese were permitted join the formal police force after passing an exam.

In the early days of Japanese colonial rule police were deployed to the cities to maintain order, often through brutal means, while the military was deployed to the countryside as a counterinsurgency and policing force. The brutality of early Japanese policing backfired and often inspired rebellion and insurrection instead of quashing it. This system was reformed by Goto Shinpei who sought to co-opt existing traditions to expand Japanese power. Out of the Qing baojia system he crafted the Hoko system of community control. The Hoko system eventually became the primary method by which the Japanese authorities went about all sorts of tasks from tax collecting, to opium smoking abatement, to keeping tabs on the population. Under the Hoko system every community was broken down into Ko, groups of ten neighboring households. When a person was convicted of a serious crime, the person's entire Ko would be fined. The system only became more effective as it was integrated with the local police.

Under Goto Shinpei police stations were established in every part of the island. Rural police stations took on extra duties with those in the aboriginal regions operating schools known as “savage children's educational institutes” to assimilate aboriginal children into Japanese culture. The local police station also controlled the rifles which aboriginal men relied upon for hunting as well as operated small barter stations which created small captive economies.

Most of the members of the police forces during this time were expatriate Japanese, though towards the latter period of Japanese rule, locals began to be recruited. Throughout much of this time, the police forces were granted broad power and authority and allegations of police brutality were common, especially during the earlier periods of Japanese rule. Consequently, they were not particularly liked by the general populace, and were often viewed as a symbol of the more oppressive side of Japanese rule; though this gradually changed with the stabilization of the political situation. Nonetheless, Japan was generally credited for formally establishing law and order in what had previously been a hotbed of rebellion and lawlessness during Qing dynasty rule. Much of the law enforcement infrastructure and traditions developed during this time would continue to be used under postwar ROC rule.

=== Police in the early ROC ===
The ROC's law enforcement system built upon the foundations laid down during the Qing dynasty with the establishment of the Peking Public Inspection Headquarters in 1902. Following the overthrow of the Qing dynasty and the establishment of the Republic in 1912, a National Police Department was established under the auspices of the Ministry of the Interior. This early centralized system consisted of a national headquarters in the capital, provincial police administrations for each province, police departments and bureaus at the municipal and county level respectively. This system was extended to Taiwan following its transfer to ROC control in 1947, two years after the close of hostilities in World War II, though the basic system from the Japanese era was retained.

=== Martial Law ===
During the period between 19 May 1949 and 14 July 1987, the Taiwan police system had a controversial page in Taiwan history.

Between 1945 and 1988, police officers in Taiwan wore khaki uniforms with khaki combination caps similar to those worn by naval officers, or with white plastic helmets similar to the U.S. Navy Shore patrol. Critics noted the similarity to military uniforms, eventually leading to the revision of police uniforms in 1988.

On 5 February 1951, by the power of the now-abolished law of contravention, police officers could grab men with long hairdo and use scissors to cut the men's long hair. So applied to mini-skirts, Hawaii shirts, flared trousers, or other clothes of the men or women with irregular dressing. On 5 February 1972, Taipei City Police Department even launched a mass-detainment against people who dressed like hippies.

In 1972, to streamline organizational costs, the National Police Department was merged with the Taiwan Police Administration to form the new National Police Agency (NPA).

The first 4 Directors-General of NPA, between 1972 and 1990, were active general officers transferred from Army or Marine Corps:

Chou Ju-cun (周菊村), between 1972 and 1976;
Kong Ling-Cheng (zh:孔令晟), between 1976 and June 1980;
Ho En-ting (何恩廷), between June 1980 and 1 August 1984;
Luo Chang (羅張), between 1 August 1984 and 4 August 1990.

The latter three even served as two-star Marine Corps Commandants.

==== Secret police organizations ====
Historically speaking, in Taiwan, unlike Special Higher Police (Tokko) and the Japanese Military police (Kempeitai) during the Japanese Colonial era, the secret police activity was not the major task of Taiwan police system during the Martial-Law era.

The Taiwan police system at that time only played as a supportive role, like performing frequent surveillance, for example. Nevertheless, the governmental body of Taiwan police system back then was and still is subjective to the supervision and coordination of National Security Bureau of the ROC National Security Council. The main secret-police work were held up by other security units listed below. Several units in the past like National Security Bureau or National Bureau of Investigation were much more fearful or despicable to the people of Taiwan. However, by the end of the Martial-Law era, these so-called "secret police" units were legalized, transformed into intelligence-oriented or law-enforcement units, or even disbanded.

The typical secret-police example of the involvement from several security units is Peng Ming-min, the famous Taiwanese political prisoner since the 1960s. Tipped off by several civilians, Peng was at first arrested by a police detail from local police station in Taipei City. Immediately, he was sent to Taiwan Garrison Command for interrogation, which was led by its Division of Political Warfare. Sequentially, Peng was courted-martial by a military tribunal organized by "Division of Judge Advocate General" of Taiwan Garrison Command. Peng was pardoned in 1965 but put under house arrest. In 1966, Peng's case was then discussed by National Security Council and transferred from Taiwan Garrison Command to Bureau of Investigation. Until his escape in January, 1970, Peng was under the regular visits from local policemen and constant surveillance from agents of Bureau of Investigation.

===== Taiwan Garrison Command =====
The influence to Taiwan of this infamous late Taiwan Garrison Command under the Ministry of National Defense is much too wide, including every aspect like politics, society, economics, culture, and even education, not just confined to the Taiwan police system. Later, it was disbanded and broken into two different units, which have evolved to the current Coast Guard Administration under the Executive Yuan and Reserve Command of the Ministry of National Defense.

===== Military Intelligence Bureau =====
Military Intelligence Bureau of the Ministry of National Defense is the successor of the controversial Bureau of Investigation and Statistics of the National Military Council of Republic of China in the early ROC era and during the Second Sino-Japanese War. It was nicknamed "Jun-Tong" (軍統), literally Military-Statistics. Before 1949, many high-ranking police officers were trained by the Military-Statistics. After 1949, many of them, and a lot of intelligence officers from the military intelligence agencies, were flooded into Taiwan police organizations. The typical case is Wang Lu-chiao (王魯翹), Father of Wang Cho-chiun, the Director-General of National Police Agency after 1 June 2008. Wang Lu-chiao was an intelligence officer of Military-Statistics and sent to Hanoi to assassinate Wang Jingwei between January and March 1939 without success. Wang Lu-chiao, after 1949 and until his death by a vehicular accident in 1973, became a successful criminal detective and later served as the Police Commissioner of Taipei City Police Department in the 1970s.

===== General Political Warfare Department of the Ministry of National Defense =====
This military institution was the equivalence of the Third Chief Directorate of KGB in former Soviet Union. In the ROC Armed Forces, every military command, down to a company or a battery, has a commissioned officer served as the third-ranking officer and a political commissar, who is either dispatched from or trained by now "Political Warfare General Bureau", which was back then "General Political Warfare Department" of the office of the Ministry of National Defense.

However, the influence of this former General Department of Political Warfare was not just confined within the ROC military. Many commissioned officers from the branch of Political Warfare were directly transferred to the police system. One of them, Chen Bi (陳壁), even were promoted to the Police Commissioner of The Taiwan Provincial Police Administration.

In the ROC, before 26 May 1995, military training lessons were mandatory to all students of senior high schools, colleges and universities. As a result, there were and still are many military instructors stationed at every school more advanced than senior high schools. Naturally these military instructors are also commissioned officers in active duty either dispatched from or trained by the branch of Political Warfare. Before 1995, one of their missions at school is to closely watch, report, or even suppress any possible anti-government or political activity launched by students on or off campus.

===== Ministry of Justice Investigation Bureau =====
The Ministry of Justice Investigation Bureau was originated from the other controversial Republic of China security unit, the Central Bureau of Investigation and Statistics, so-called "Zhong-Tong" or literally "Central Statistics" Zhong-Tong was subordinate to the Central Executive Committee of Chinese Nationalist Party before 1949.

===== National Security Bureau =====
The National Security Bureau of the ROC National Security Council was established at the suggestion of Chiang Ching-kuo in 1956. This bureau served as the primary intelligence unit in Taiwan and headed by Cheng Jie-Min (鄭介民), a heavy-weight three-star army general from Military-Statistics. The purpose of creating such a new intelligence agency was to settle the inter-agency rivalry among the intelligence community in Taiwan and allow more direct access for Chiang Kai-shek and Chiang Ching-kuo.

=== Post-Martial Law era reforms ===
In 1990, Chuang Heng-dai (莊亨岱), by then the Commissioner of Railway Police Bureau, became the first career police officer with the background of a criminal investigator to take over the chief of NPA. Since then, all the successive directors-general of NPA are promoted from career police officers in active duty within the Taiwan police system.

The Taiwan Provincial Police Administration was again separated from the NPA in 1995 with the implementation of local autonomy statutes in the ROC Constitution. Fire-fighting units also ceased to be part of the NPA from that year and were reorganized into a separate fire department. National Fire Agency of Ministry of Interior was established on 1 March 1995 to be responsible for fire prevention, disaster rescue and emergency medical service.

In 1999, with the downsizing of the provincial level of government, the Taiwan Provincial Police Administration was dissolved and its personnel and responsibilities were once again transferred to the National Police Agency.

An increase in crime and liberalization of the mass media in the 1990s led to many questions concerning the effectiveness of the police force in investigating and fighting crime, as opposed to its prior concentration on crowd and riot control, a carryover from the martial law era.

=== Recent years ===
With increased media coverage in recent years and the proliferation of tabloid newspapers and 24-hour cable news channels throughout Taiwan, the police force has been faced with new challenges involving high-profile crimes, and increased media involvement. Past concerns of police corruption have largely been replaced by concerns of police ineffectiveness, particularly in light of several high-profile cases in recent years. Gun related crime has also increased, though the overall crime rate in Taiwan remains lower than that of most western and Asian nations.

On 22 July 2000, four workers carrying out riverbed construction work in the Pachang River of Chiayi County, were surrounded by the quickly rising torrent on Saturday afternoon. The four stood in the center of the river for three hours, waiting for a helicopter that never came, and were finally washed away at around 7:08 pm in sight of family members, helpless would-be rescuers, and the lens of news cameras on the riverbank. The delay was attributed to bureaucratic red tape and three top government officials resigned, including Yu Shyi-kun, the vice Premier of Executive Yuan and two Director-Generals from National Police Agency and National Fire Agency. This Pachang-Creek incident (zh:八掌溪事件) caused a field day for the news media in Taiwan and triggered a reform of the airborne emergency management system. On 10 March 2004, the newly formed National Airborne Service Corps (NASC) of the Ministry of Interior absorbed four civil airborne squadrons

The Airborne Squadron of National Police Agency,
The Preparatory Office of the Airborne Fire Fighting Squadron of National Fire Agency,
The Aviation Team of Civil Aeronautics Administration of Ministry of Transportation and Communications,
The Air Patrol Squadron of the Coast Guard Administration.

NASC takes over the responsibilities of five major airborne tasks:Search and Rescue, Disaster Relief, Emergency Medical Services, Reconnaissance and Patrol, and Transportation.

On 26 July 2004, members of the Criminal Investigation Bureau engaged in what was arguably the largest gun battle in the history of modern Taiwan with members of a kidnapping gang in Kaohsiung County (now part of Kaohsiung City). Though they held a numerical advantage, the officers found themselves outgunned by the suspects who possessed bulletproof vests and M16's. In the ensuing gunfight four police officers were injured, and two suspects were shot and arrested. However the ringleader of the gang managed to escape along with a cohort after holding a passing civilian hostage and escaping in a hijacked car on live TV. The ensuing manhunt was widely covered, the ringleader Chang Hsi-ming) was finally arrested following another gun battle with police on 13 July 2005.

In 2006, police selection criteria were amended to include all persons with a high school diploma between ages 18–28 able to pass a police civil service exam and undergo one year of training. This removed the past requirement where only graduates of specialized police colleges and universities were allowed to become police officers.

On 28 February 2006, Hou You-yi, the Criminal Investigation Bureau Commissioner, assumed command as the director-general of the National Police Agency. He, a career criminal investigator, is the youngest-ever to hold that post. Wang Cho-chiun, Chief of Taipei City Police Department, was named as the new director-general effective June 2008.

On 2 Jan 2007, according to "the Organic Law of the National Immigration Agency" enacted on 30 Nov 2005, the NPA's former Immigration Office was expanded to become the National Immigration Agency under the direct control of the Ministry of the Interior, and Wu Cheng-chi (吳振吉) was named the first director general of NIA.

== Police ==
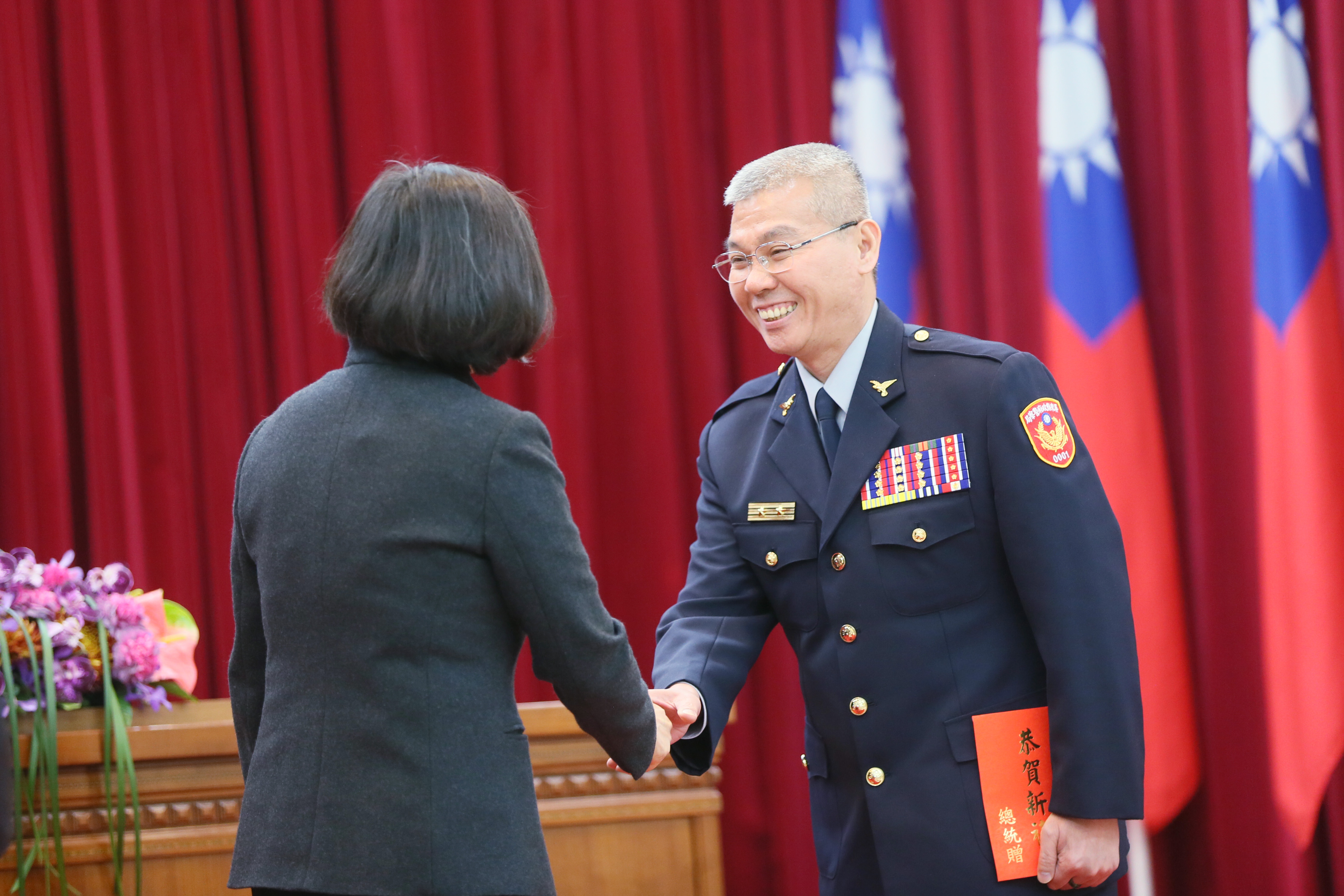
The Republic of China President Tsai Ing-wen issued a new year red envelope with money in to the Pingtung County Police Bureau.

Most actual law enforcement and day-to-day policing duties are delegated to local police departments on a city and county level which answer to the National Police Agency (NPA) but are considered agencies of their local government. However the NPA has direct control over several specialized units which may be deployed to assist local forces, as well as the national highway patrol.

Unlike the police system in the United States, the central government appoints the head positions of city and county Police Departments in the ROC and thus forms a solid chain of command for all police personnel. By calling a personnel review board, the Director-General of NPA has the full control of personnel rotation and transfer, as well as administrative commendations and reprimands over all high ranking police officers, including chiefs of local police departments.

In addition to normal law enforcement duties, police in the ROC are charged with other slightly more unusual duties such as taking census data, as well as immigration and visa related issues. Most jurisdictions also have a Foreign Affairs squad staffed by English speaking officers tasked with visa enforcement and issues relating to foreigners or the foreign community in Taiwan.

In Taiwan, including islands of Kinmen and Matsu, there are a total of 1,615 various local police stations.

=== Local Agencies ===
Local police departments exist for all administrative divisions above the county/provincial city level. There are 26 local departments in total. All local agencies are subordinate to the NPA as well as their respective local government, and all police officers wear the same uniform regardless of jurisdiction.

Local city and county governments are responsible for allocating funds for their local police departments and local police chiefs must attend city or county council meetings to answer questions from council members. While all high ranking police officers are subject to personnel rotation and transfer by the NPA, under the wake of local autonomy beginning in 1990, the NPA Director-General will usually consult with local officials regarding the appointment of local police chiefs.

==== Municipal Police Departments ====
The Police Commissioners of the Taipei and Kaohsiung City Police Departments hold the rank of "Director-General, first level," which is the same as the Director-General of National Police Agency, before 2007.

Before 2007, although the Directors-General of the Taipei and Kaohsiung City Police Departments hold the same rank as the Directors-General of National Police Agency and Central Police University, the latter two are both presidential commissions and appointed by the Minister of the Interior. As a courtesy, the two local Directors-General usually wear a lower rank in public.

After 2007, the rank Directors-General Supreme is created and specifically offered to the Director-General of National Police Agency. Currently, each of all 6 city police departments of special municipalities (Taipei City, Kaohsiung City, New Taipei City, Taichung City, Tainan City, Taoyuan City) is headed by a Director-General Level 1, and no longer wears a lower rank in public.

===== Taipei City Police Department =====
Somehow different from the Police system of Japan, in the capital Taipei City, the city government has its own Taipei City Police Department and a subordinate criminal investigative force, "Criminal Investigation Division", which is also an active and famous police force in the field.

===== Kaohsiung City Police Department =====
In retrospect to the organization of police administration of Kaohsiung City, it has gone through history and experienced the great changes of the society. In fact it has to be traced back to the time of Japanese colonization. At that time there was the establishment of Eastern Police Office, Western Police Office, Marine Police Office and Fire Police Office.

After the end of Japanese colonization in October 1945, they were used continuously until the official establishment of Police Office of Kaohsiung City on 8 November 1945. This new police office was in charge of the maintenance of law and order of the whole city. On 14 February 1946, there was the establishment of the 1st and 2nd Precincts, Marine Branch Office and Fire Office. In 1958 the Police Office of Kaohsiung City was permitted to be promoted as a police department of Grade B system. Meanwhile, two more Precinct Offices were added.

On 1 July 1970 the police office was furthermore promoted as the only one belonging to Grade A system in Taiwan Police System. Under it, there were 7 Police Precincts established. On 1 July 1979 Kaohsiung City was officially promoted as a special municipal city under the central government. The Police Office of Kaohsiung City was officially named as Kaohsiung Municipal Police Department.

==== Island Police Departments in Fujian ====
Kinmen and Lien-chiang County Police Departments are two local agencies which are historically out of the mainstream of Taiwan police system. The local police forces were merged into the two respective military theater garrison commands once or twice.

Since the direct travel between mainland China and Kinmen and Matsu was opened in 2002, the local police departments are put on heavier duty of border security and immigration checking.

===== Kinmen County Police Department =====
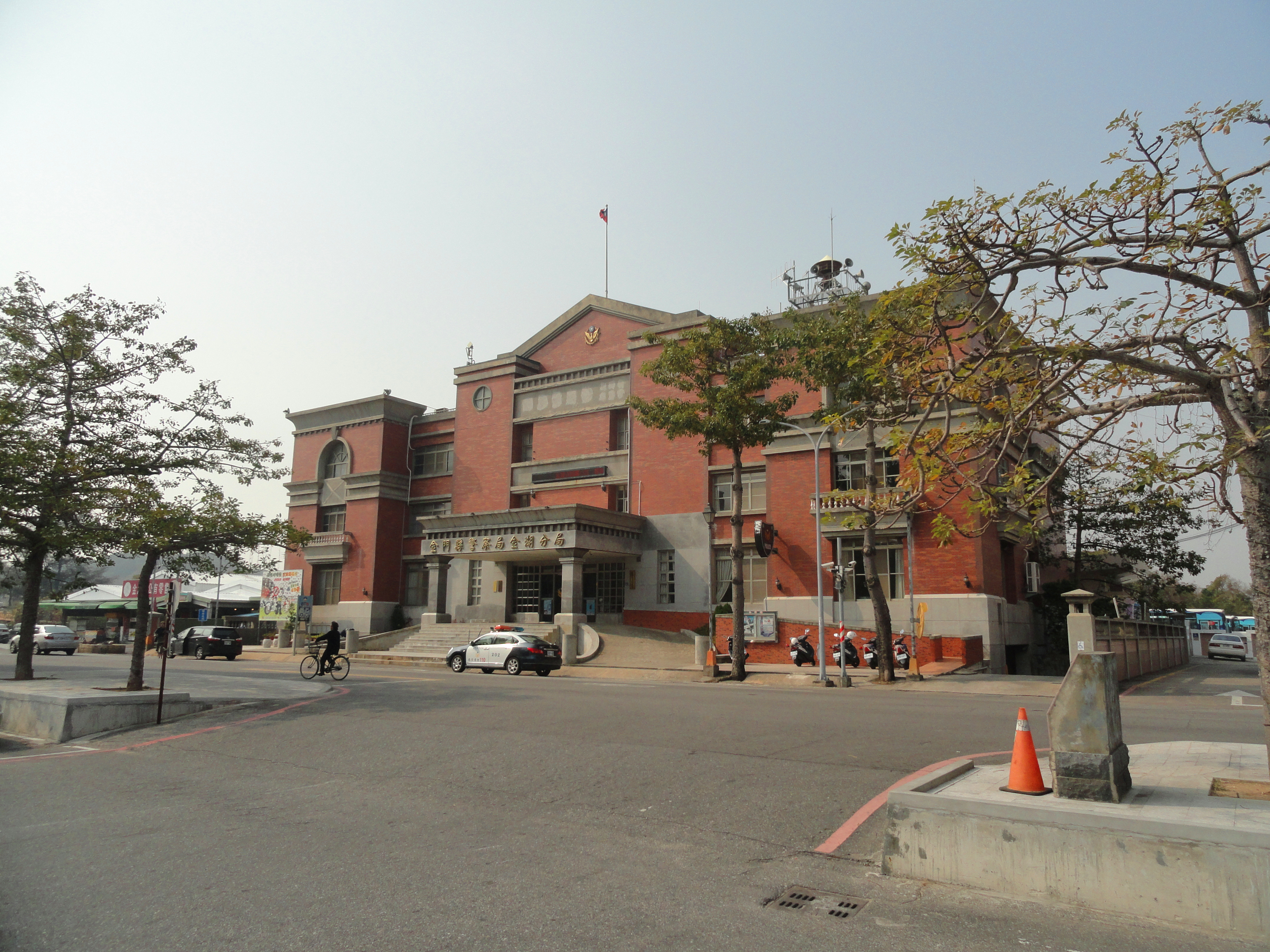
Kinmen County police department

Its root can be traced back to China in 1915. The local police department was once disbanded in 1949 and replaced by the military security forces under the Kinmen garrison command. Then, in 1953, along with the reinstatement of Kinmen County government, Kinmen PD was detached from military command and assigned to the county government, which was still under the oversight of Kinmen military committee until 1992.

Today, its table of organization contains 312 police officers and three field police brigades: Forces of "Criminal Investigation", "Special Police" and "Traffic Police."

There is no police precincts(分局) in Kinmen. The Kinmen County Police Department has direct control over its six police institutes(所), which are somehow between the level of "police precinct" and "police station."

"Wu-chiu dispatched Police Station" is attached to the Kinmen County Police Department for the convenience of administration.

===== Lienchiang County Police Department =====
It is stationed at Matsu Islands.

Lien-chiang County Police Department was formed with 17 police officers in 1956 as a military security detail "Lien-chiang County Police Institute" under Matsu military committee. In December 1965, it was re-designated as "Lien-chiang County Police Department." In May 1967, it was then separated from a military unit and turned into a real civilian police force with four dispatched police stations.

After two expansions in June 1979 and in November 1998, it now contains 124 police officers and two field police brigades: Forces of "Criminal Investigation" and "Special Police and Traffic."

In August 2001, Lien-chiang County Police Department reorganized and upgraded its four dispatched police stations to four "police institutes." Among them, two police stations are added to "Nankan Police Institute" and one "Dongjyu Police Station" on Dungjyu island is formed up and subordinated to "Chukuang Police Institute."

== Military Police ==
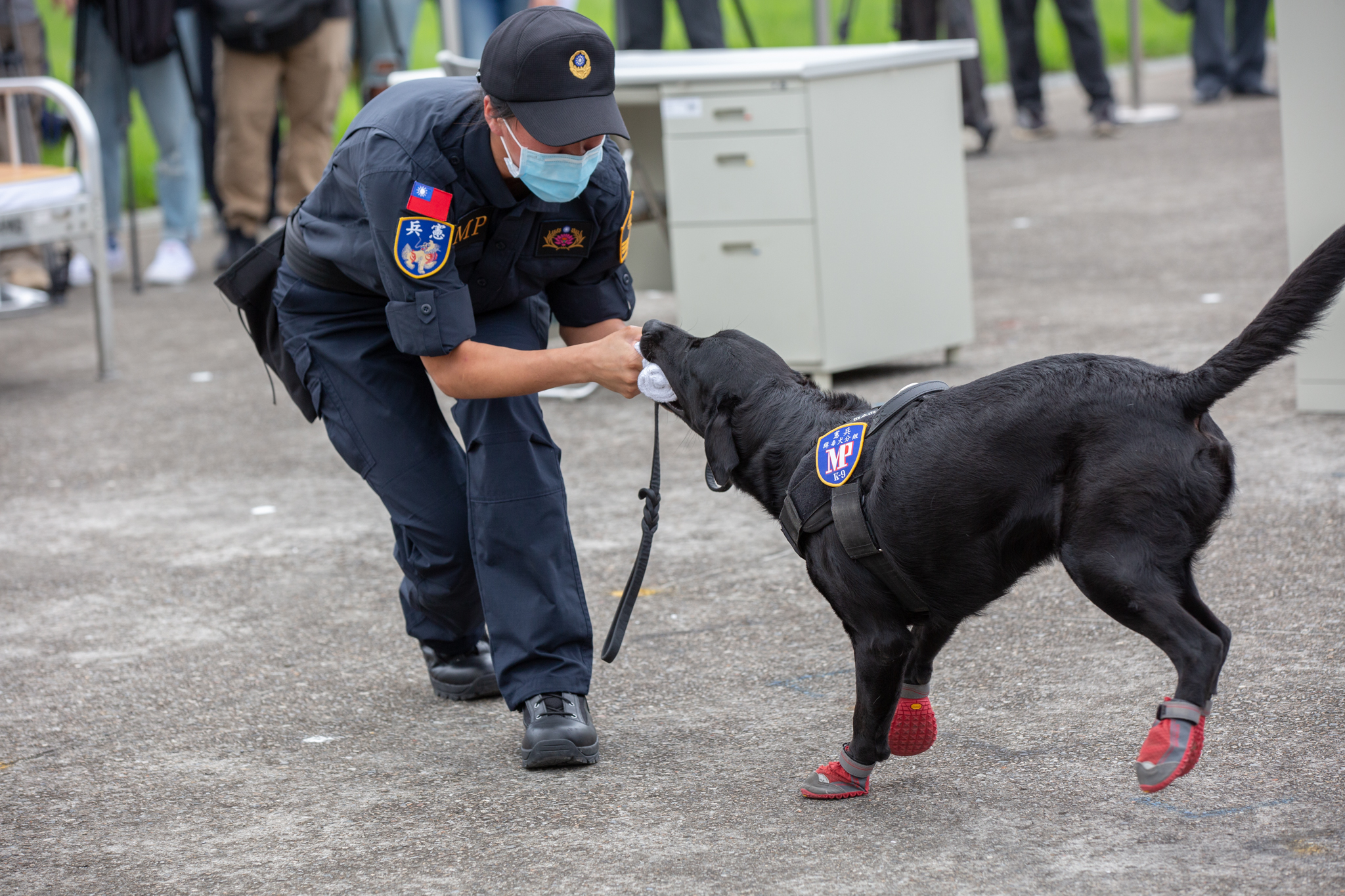
MP K-9 unit conducting drug search.

ROCMP is responsible for enforcing military law, maintaining military discipline, providing manpower support for the civilian police force, performing combat duty in times of emergency, providing security for certain governmental facilities such as including the Presidential Office Building, and performing counter-terrorism and VIP protection operations. It is also responsible for the defense of Taipei, the capital city and political and financial center of the Republic of China.

In accordance with; Clause 2, Section 1 of Article 229; Clause 2, Section 1 of Article 230; and Clause 2, Section 1 of Article 231 of The Criminal Procedure Code of the ROC, the commissioned and non-commissioned officers, and the enlisted persons of the MP Corps have the authority to assist public prosecutors or to be commanded by prosecutors to investigate crime activities. In the other words, performing the authority of Judicial Police are given by The Criminal Procedure Code of the ROC to the Security MP troops in the regional Military Police units, and it is the same in nature as the police performing the actual criminal investigations. Before the establishment and expansion of the mobile forces of special police corps in the ROC, Military Police troops were the main force to secure and prevent high-profile criminal activities, heavy violence, and frequent society disorders or riots. At present, Military Police troops are still aggressively working with and commanded by the district public procurator systems to investigate criminal cases. The Security MP troops are still one of the important forces that uphold the law and order of society in the Republic of China.

== Justice Investigation and National Security ==
Regarding drugs, corruptions, espionage, and economic crimes, the Investigative Bureau of Ministry of Justice (MJIB) has developed stronger capability to cover cases in those categories for decades. The investigation of these cases, police corruption included, are usually transferred to or led by the Bureau of Investigation.

Historically, counter-intelligence affairs are under the turf of MJIB. Different from "special branch" in the police system in United Kingdom, the security divisions at all levels of Taiwan police system are mainly staff units, not fielded police details. Under the supervision of National Security Bureau, all non-mililary cases of espionage would soon be moved to the Bureau of Investigation.

== Coast Guard ==
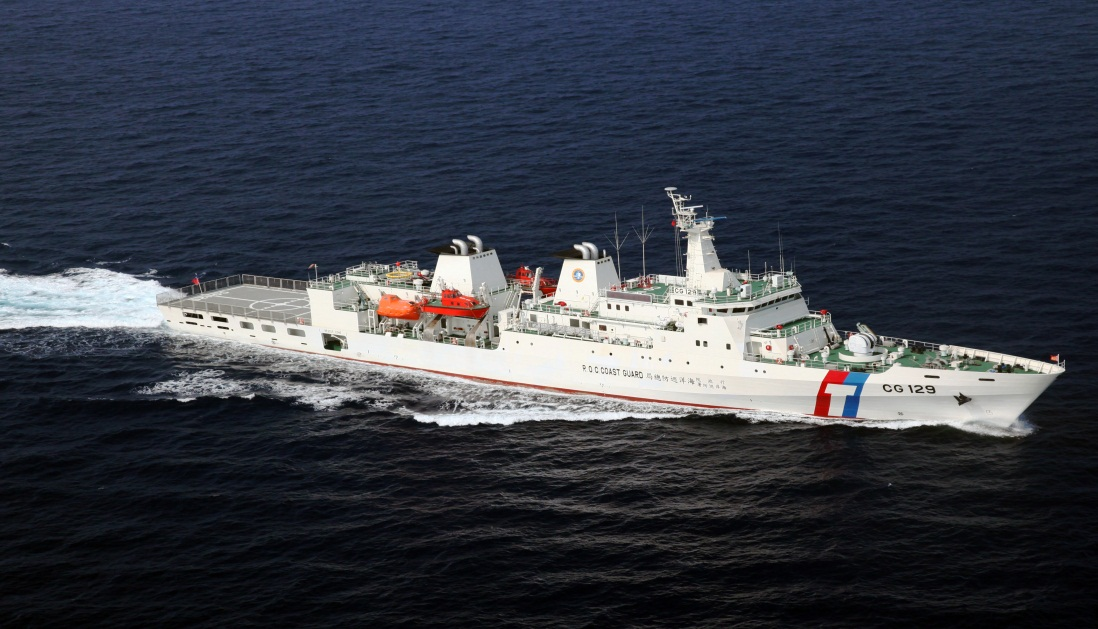
The 3,000-ton cutter Kaohsiung

Smuggling and arms trafficking has been a long been an issue in Taiwan. Human-trafficking and its counterpart, prostitution, are increasingly serious problems in Taiwan. The maritime patrol of the Coast Guard Administration have the responsibility to stop those crimes at sea, and the coastal patrol of Coast Guard Administration are responsible for intercepting such criminal cases along the coast of Taiwan. The in-land territory of Taiwan should be the responsibility of individual local police departments or national law enforcement units from the NPA or MJIB.

Cases like smuggling and human-trafficking may cause turf wars between competing law enforcement agencies. In some examples, when brothels were raided by plain-clothes peace officers, the pimp would quietly go to the local police station and gather possible information about his girls in detention, but sometimes the pimp would later find that his girls were held up by the local coastal patrol units.

== Public Prosecutor ==
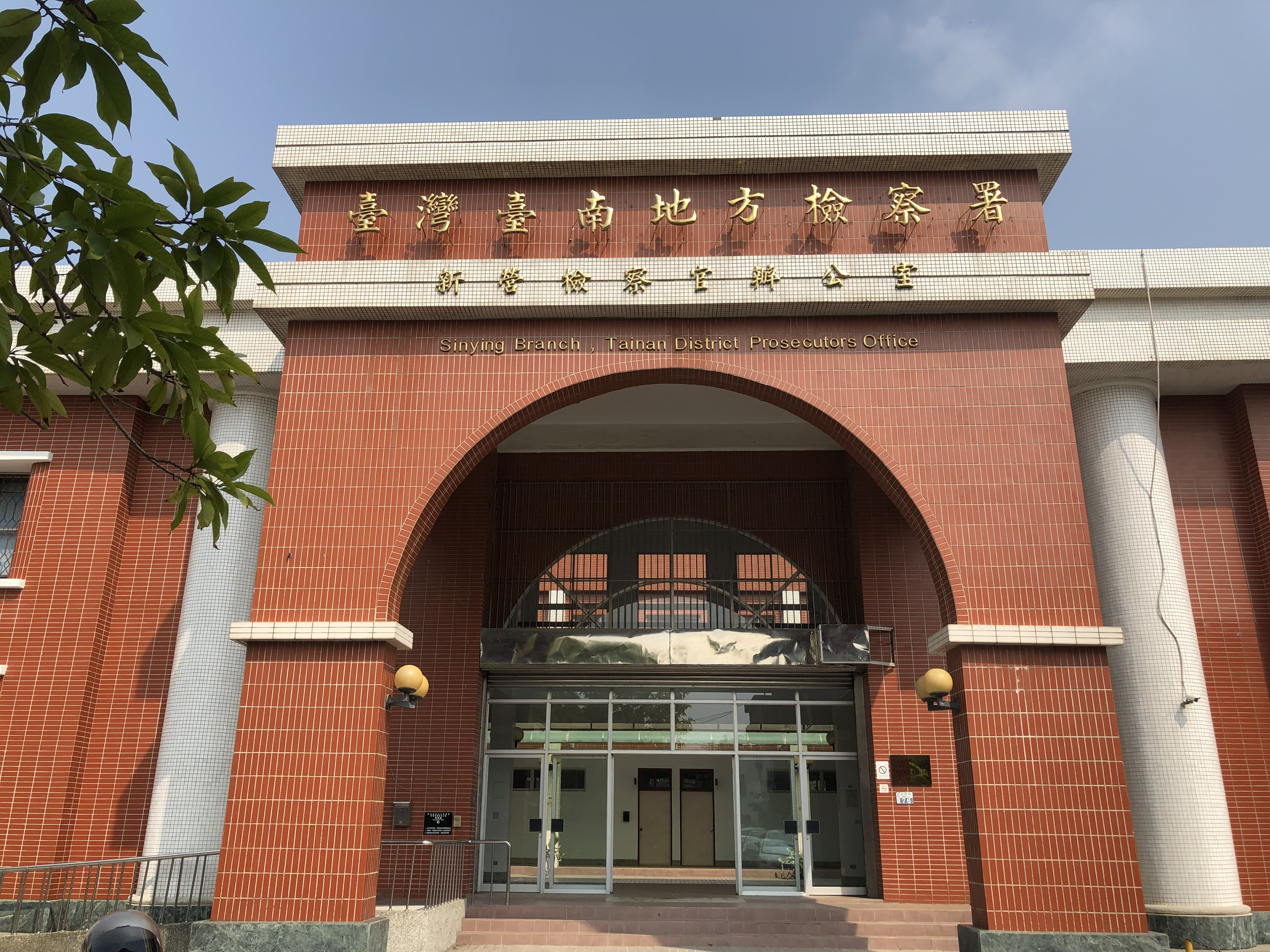
Taiwan Tainan District Prosecutors Office.

The duty of the Prosecutor is to represent Government to investigate crime and to expose or reveal conspiracies or secrets, as well as to preserve the justice and fairness of a society. In criminal procedure, prosecution authorities are placed in all courts according to the Court Organic Act (法院組織法) to develop the rules of criminal procedure trial level function.

== See also ==
- Constitution of the Republic of China
- Law of Taiwan
- Supreme Prosecutors Office
- National Police Agency (Taiwan)
- Organized crime in Taiwan
