= 2025 Taipei stabbings =

Mass murder in Taiwan

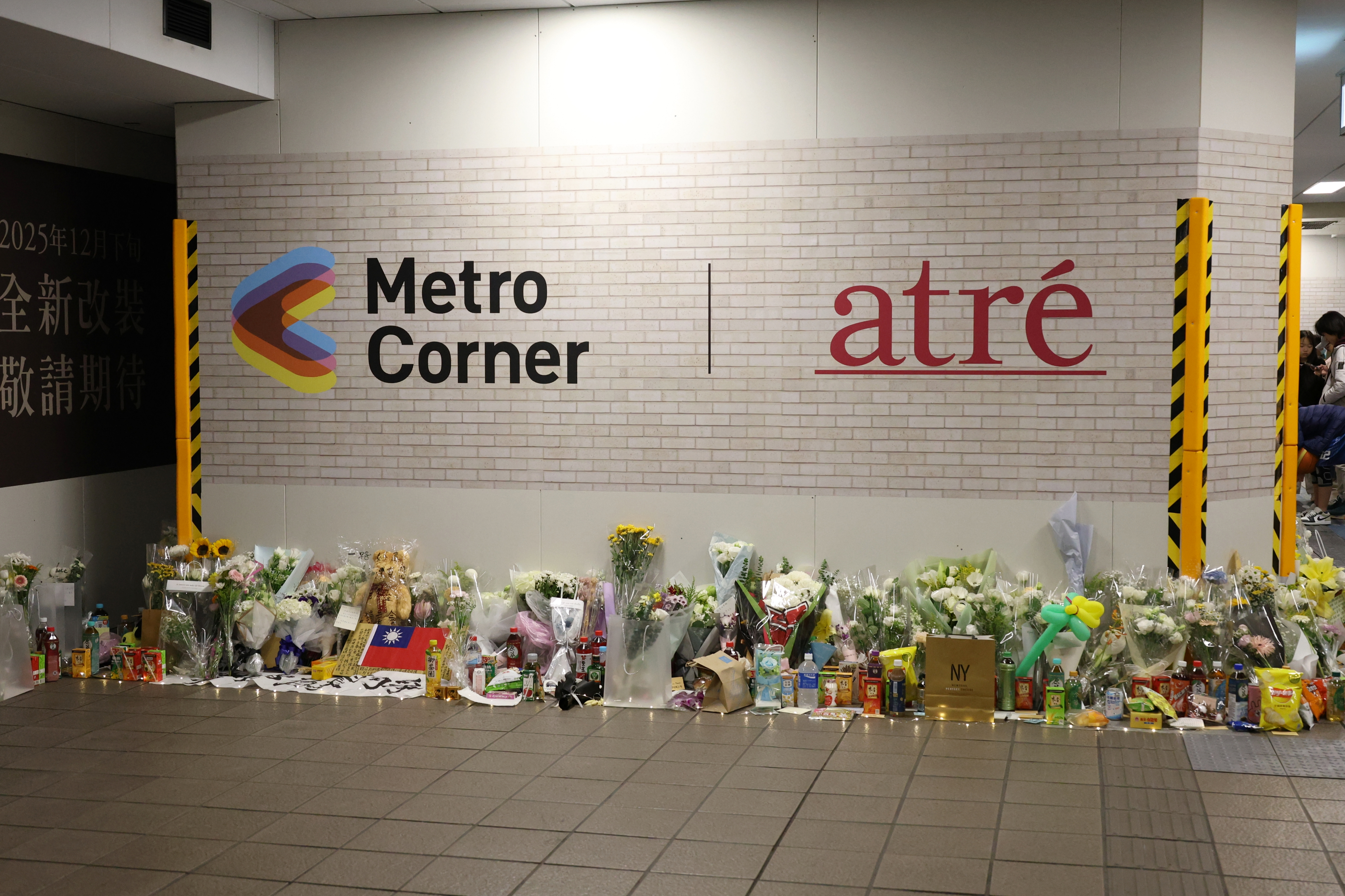
- Memorial bouquets and messages at the Taipei Main Station after the attack
- Location of the stabbing in Taipei
- Location: 25°02′52″N 121°31′02″E; Taipei, Taiwan
- Date: 19 December 2025 c. 17:24 – c. 18:00 (National Standard Time, UTC+08:00)
- Target: Civilians
- Attack type: Mass stabbing; mass murder; killing spree; arson; murder–suicide
- Weapons: Smoke grenades; Knife; Molotov Cocktails
- Deaths: 4 (including the perpetrator)
- Injuries: 11
- Perpetrator: Chang Wen (張文)
- Motive: Infamy; 2014 Taipei Metro attack, 2024 Taichung MRT attack copycat crime

On 19 December 2025, 27-year-old Chang Wen (Chinese: 張文) (Note: Chinese: 张文; pinyin: Zhāng Wén; Wade–Giles: Chang^{1} Wên^{2}) threw smoke grenades and stabbed people at two locations in Taipei, Taiwan, killing three people and injuring eleven others. Chang Wen fled from police and died when he fell from the Eslite Bookstore Nanxi building near Zhongshan Station.

== Events ==
Before the stabbings, Chang committed two arson attacks on roads in Zhongshan District, setting parked vehicles on fire. He later returned to his apartment building and set it ablaze as well.

At about 17:24, Chang was seen wearing black body armor and a gas mask near the M7 and M8 exits of Taipei Main Station. He removed a smoke grenade from a suitcase and detonated it, filling the area with smoke. A 57-year-old man, Yu Chia-Chang (Chinese: 余家昶), (Note: pinyin: Yú Jiāchǎng; Wade–Giles: Yü^{2} Chia^{1}-ch'ang^{3}) attempted to intervene but was stabbed with a long knife and later pronounced dead at the National Taiwan University Hospital.

After the attack, Chang returned to his hotel next to Zhongshan Station to retrieve his weapon and change clothes before carrying out the next assault. At around 18:00, he threw more smoke grenades outside the station at the entrance to an Eslite Spectrum shopping center and indiscriminately slashed civilians before fleeing into the building. Videos captured him casually tossing smoke grenades into crowds gathered on a sidewalk and smoke filling an underground station. While fleeing, he fell from the roof of the building and was pronounced dead at Cathay General Hospital after resuscitation attempts were unsuccessful.

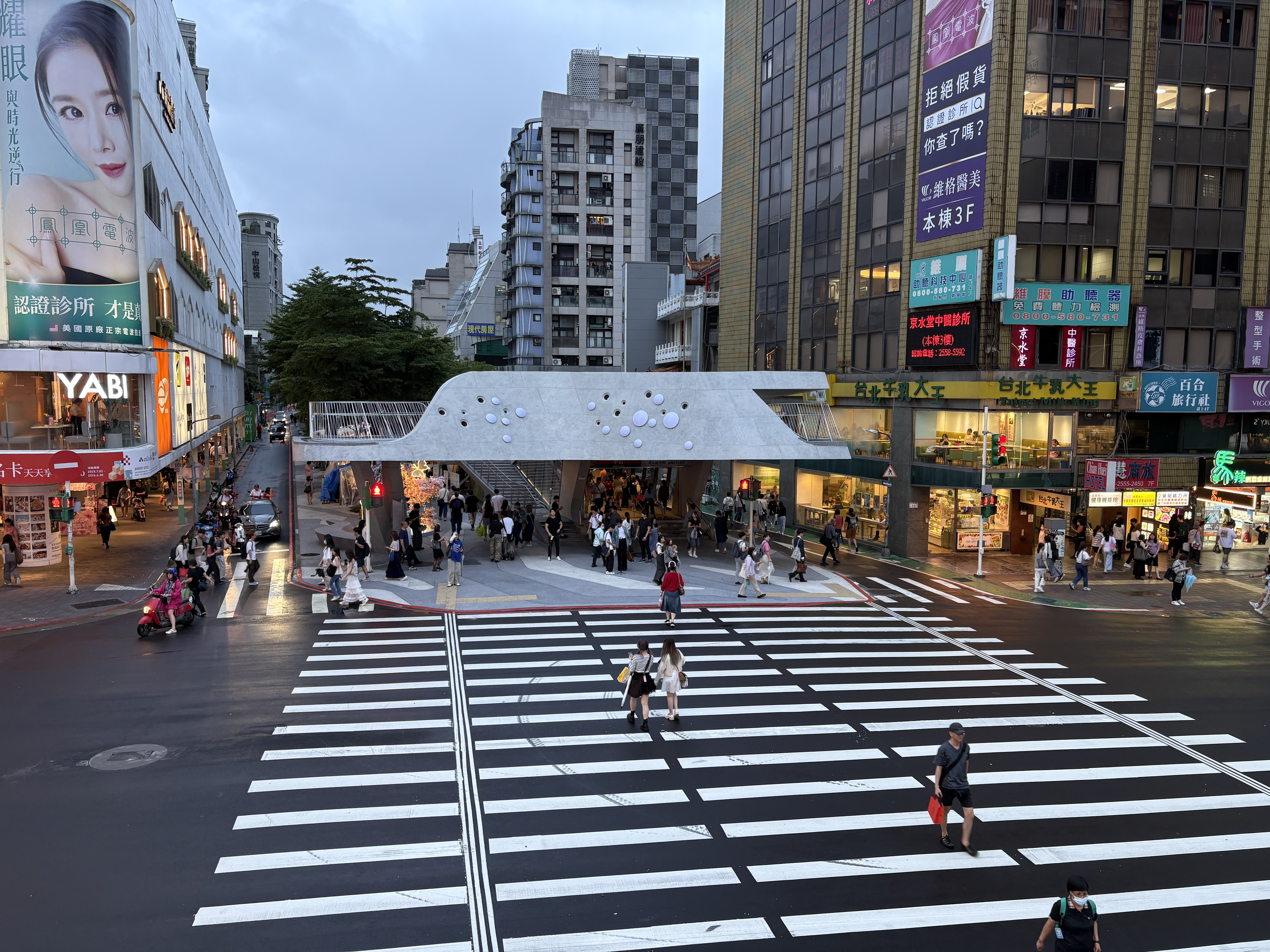
The exit of the Zhongshan metro station, where one of the attacks occurred, pictured in July 2025

== Victims ==
Three people were killed: Yu and two 37-year-old men. Eleven others were injured, including two who were listed in critical condition on 20 December. At least two of the victims were stabbed in the neck. Six out of the eleven had minor injuries and sought medical attention on their own.

On 20 December, the Taiwan Centers for Disease Control (CDC) of the Ministry of Health and Welfare said that the Taipei City Health Bureau confirmed that one of the injured was HIV-positive before the stabbing and on long-term medication with an undetectable viral load. During the incident, his blood was splattered at the scene, raising concerns about possible infection for the other victims. To address potential exposure from the weapon or blood at the scene, the CDC established a post-exposure counseling and publicly funded medication program for the stabbings and coordinated with the Taipei City Health Bureau to assist affected individuals.

On 21 December, Taipei Mayor Chiang Wan-an stated in an interview that the city would present a commendation certificate to Yu for his "valiant" attempt to oppose the attack, along with NT$6 million in condolence payments. The Taipei Metro Corporation will also provide NT$5 million in compensation to the victim's family and place a memorial plaque at the MRT station. The Legislative Yuan's Internal Affairs Committee passed an extemporaneous motion to begin commendation proceedings the following day, pending submission by the local government of Yu's hometown. On 23 December, Taoyuan Mayor Chang San-cheng announced plans to honor Yu at the Taoyuan Martyrs' Shrine during the 2026 Spring Memorial Service and to seek a Commendation Order from the central government. Mega International Commercial Bank confirmed that it would cover the funeral arrangements for a 37-year-old employee who was among the deceased, and offer "generous" bereavement benefits to his family. However, the 37-year-old passerby who was stabbed on the public road, rather than inside the Taipei Metro or Eslite premises, was found to be possibly ineligible for insurance compensation. In response, Chiang mentioned that support for the case would come from insurance payouts, compensation from the Association for Victims Support, (Note: Chinese: 犯罪被害人保護協會; pinyin: Fànzuì bèihàirén bǎohù xiéhuì) social welfare resources from his government, and public donations.

== Perpetrator ==
The attacker was identified as Chang Wen (19 March 1998 – 19 December 2025), a 27-year-old Taiwanese male. On 20 December, police preliminarily ruled out terrorism as a motive for the attack, stating that Chang was not known to have made specific political, religious, or ideological statements. It added that Chang had no contact with his family for more than two years, had been discharged from the Republic of China Armed Forces for driving under the influence of alcohol, and that searches on his cloud backup included those for "random killings", such as the 2014 Taipei Metro attack. He was suspected of breaching the Punishment Act for Violation of Military Service System after he failed to report for reserve military training, and was placed on the Taoyuan Prosecutors Office official wanted list. Police also said Chang began preparing for the attack in April 2024 by purchasing smoke grenades, gas canisters, respirators, and other materials. He then rented an apartment in Zhongshan in January 2025 and scouted the area in preparation for the attacks, adding that he had acted alone and planned to "randomly kill people".

== Investigation ==
After the incident, the Taiwan Taipei District Prosecutors Office immediately dispatched the chief prosecutor and prosecutors to the scene to direct the local police to conduct evidence collection and preliminary investigation, and to search the suspect's rented house. Police found survival game supplies, 17 smoke grenades, 15 molotov cocktails, tactical vests, and knives in the Taipei MRT connecting passage in Taipei Main Station. During the search of the hotel where the suspect Chang stayed, they found multiple molotov cocktails, suspected homemade incendiary bombs, a knife, a raincoat, a black hat, and two tablets as evidence. In his rented apartment in Zhongzheng District, they also found four knives, a burned ROG laptop, and five gasoline cans. Based on the plan seized from cloud platform, the police determined that he had been unemployed for one to two years and had planned the crime, conducted a site survey, and carried out the attack according to the plan before the incident. In addition, the suspect's rented house was located in the Bo'ai Special Zone, not far from the Presidential Office Building. According to the police's preliminary investigation, there were no accomplices and the incident was not a terrorist attack.

On 20 December, the Taipei City Police Department task force deciphered the attack plan stored by the suspect on a cloud drive and believed that he was suspected of imitating the random killing incident on the Taipei Metro in 2014. Meanwhile, when attempting to unlock the Apple devices, the Criminal Investigation Bureau's Technology Research and Development Division discovered that even when using the globally recognized advanced forensic software Cellebrite and GrayKey, the iPad Air and iPhone which the perpetrator used would automatically disconnect the moment it connected, making it impossible to establish a connection, let alone crack the password or export the data.

During the investigation, an intact solid-state drive was obtained from the ROG gaming laptop that he had burned. And rumor that the solid-state drive used BitLocker digital encryption technology, neither ASUS nor Microsoft able to crack it. On January 16, after the conclusion of the investigation. ASUS statement that the ROG laptop did not have the BitLocker encryption mechanism set up at the time.

=== Conclusion ===
On 15 January, Taiwan Taipei District Prosecutors Office conclude that that the suspect actions constitute highly planned "expressive lone-actor violence". The investigation found no evidence that the suspect had any unexplained source of funds or that there was any organized crime or accomplices. They also successfully investigated internal data on the suspects iPad Air, iPhone, and laptop and found no crime plans on those electronic devices. An attack plan named "2025/12" was found on the suspects cloud drive detailing the "attack timeline" and the crime plan. It revealed the original attack plan which included throwing a large number of molotov cocktails and smoke grenades around Zhongshan MRT station, however due to failed attempts on Taipei Main Station, the suspect decide to rule out the plan for arson around Zhongshan MRT station. The suspect also paid long-term attention to earlier random shootings or indiscriminate attacks with multiple deaths and injuries including the 2014 Taipei Metro attack, and the 2024 Taichung MRT attack and those that occurred in countries such as Japan, the United States, Sweden, and Australia. The Prosecutors Office ruled out that there were escape plans and further attack plan, which conclude that the suspect fall was suicidal, not a failed escape rumor by the citizens.

== Aftermath ==
In the immediate aftermath, Taiwanese authorities increased security at major transport hubs, including metro stations and airports, with heightened police patrols in crowded areas of Taipei. By the following day, flowers and messages of condolence were placed near Exit M8 at Taipei Main Station. A market near Zhongshan Station was closed for three days beginning on 20 December. The Taipei Marathon on 21 December, just two days later, was the first major international event in the city since the incident. In response, Taipei increased security measures citywide and nearly doubled the number of personnel deployed.

On 21 December, the Criminal Investigation Bureau reported that about 20 threatening or indiscriminate attack posts and comments had appeared online. A nationwide task force was formed to investigate these cases. At least three suspects were caught and are set to face legal consequences.

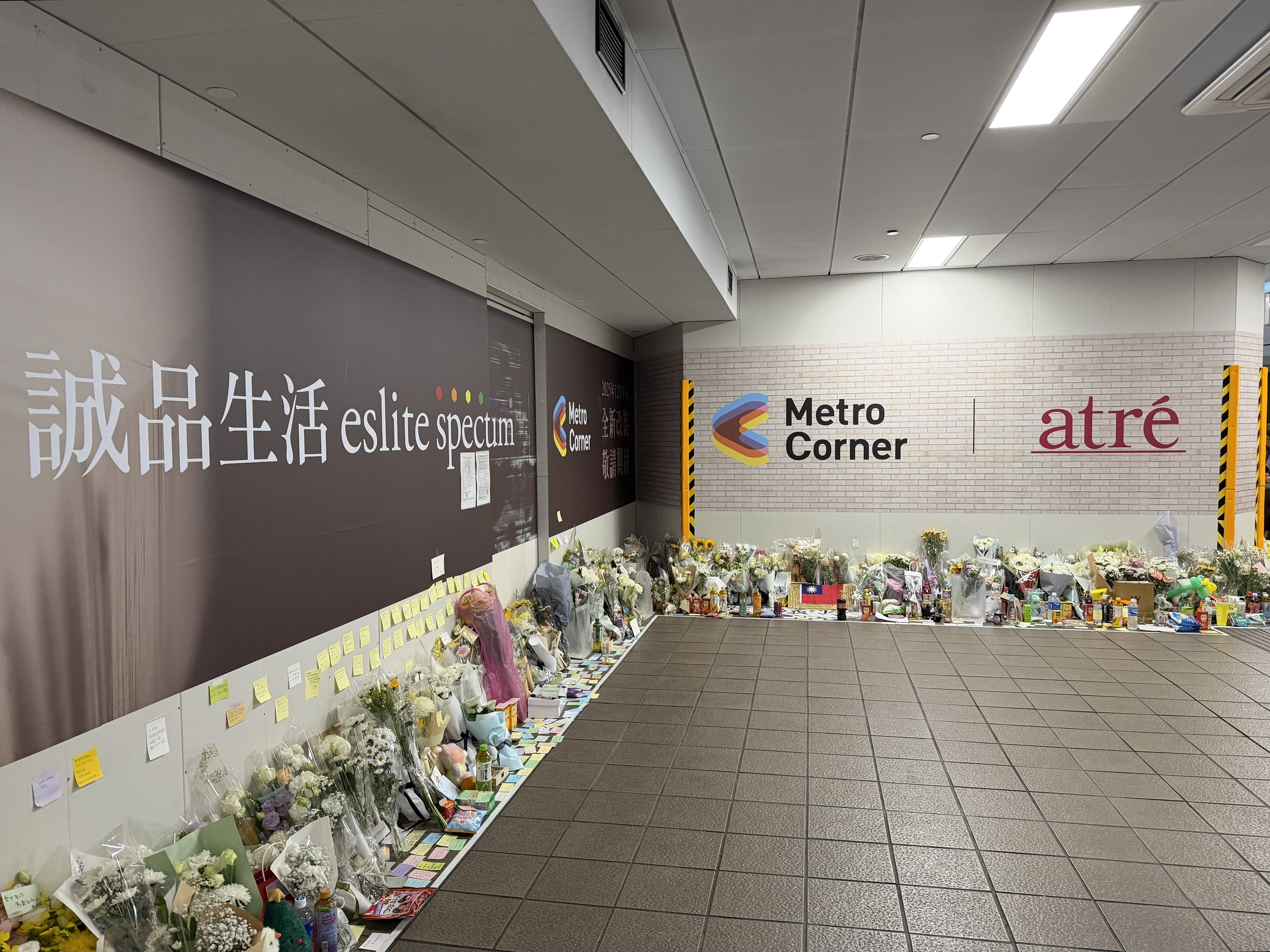
Memorial bouquets at B1 floor of Taipei Main Station Bannan Line

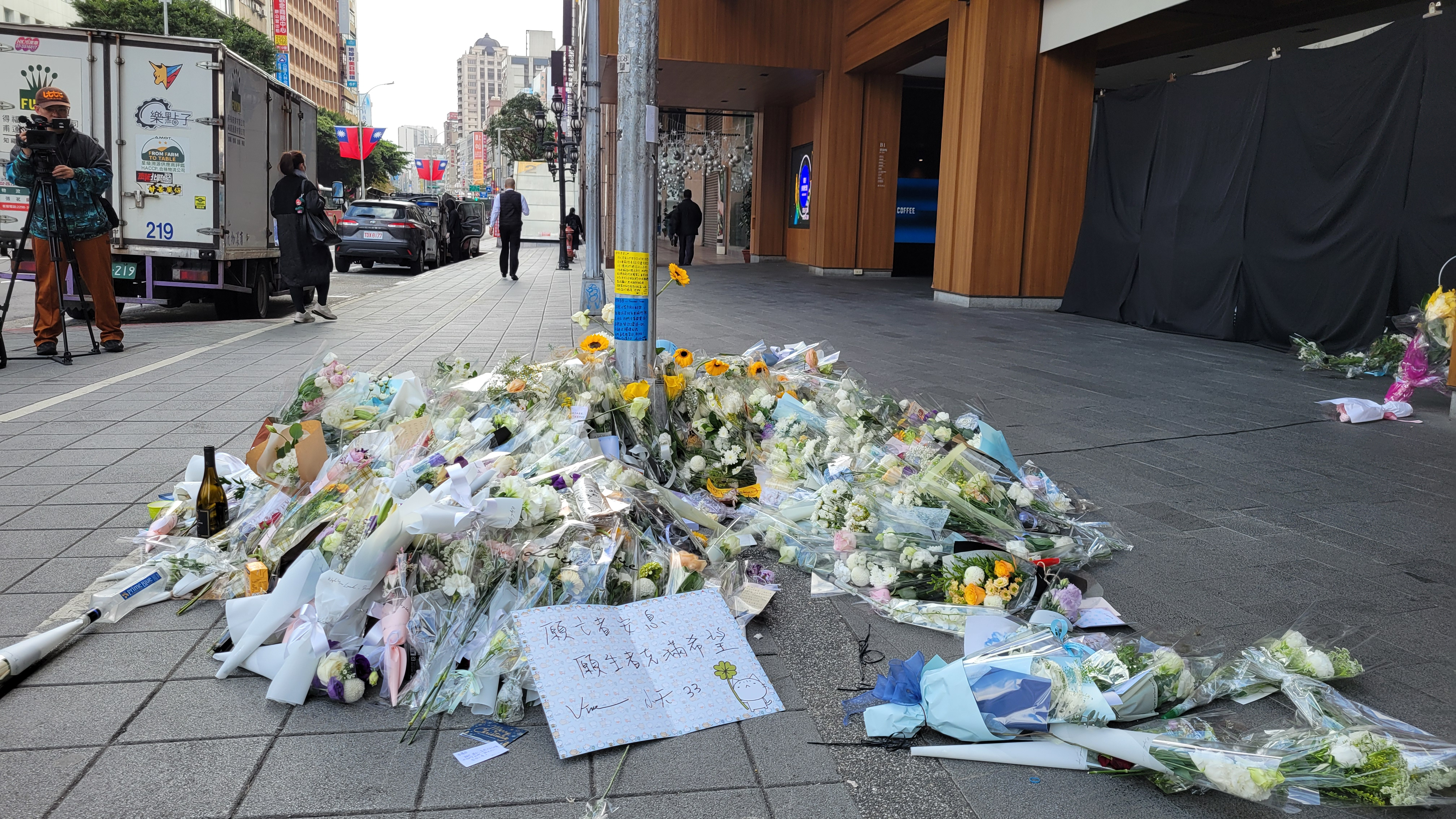
Flowers and messages of condolences in front of Eslite Nanxi

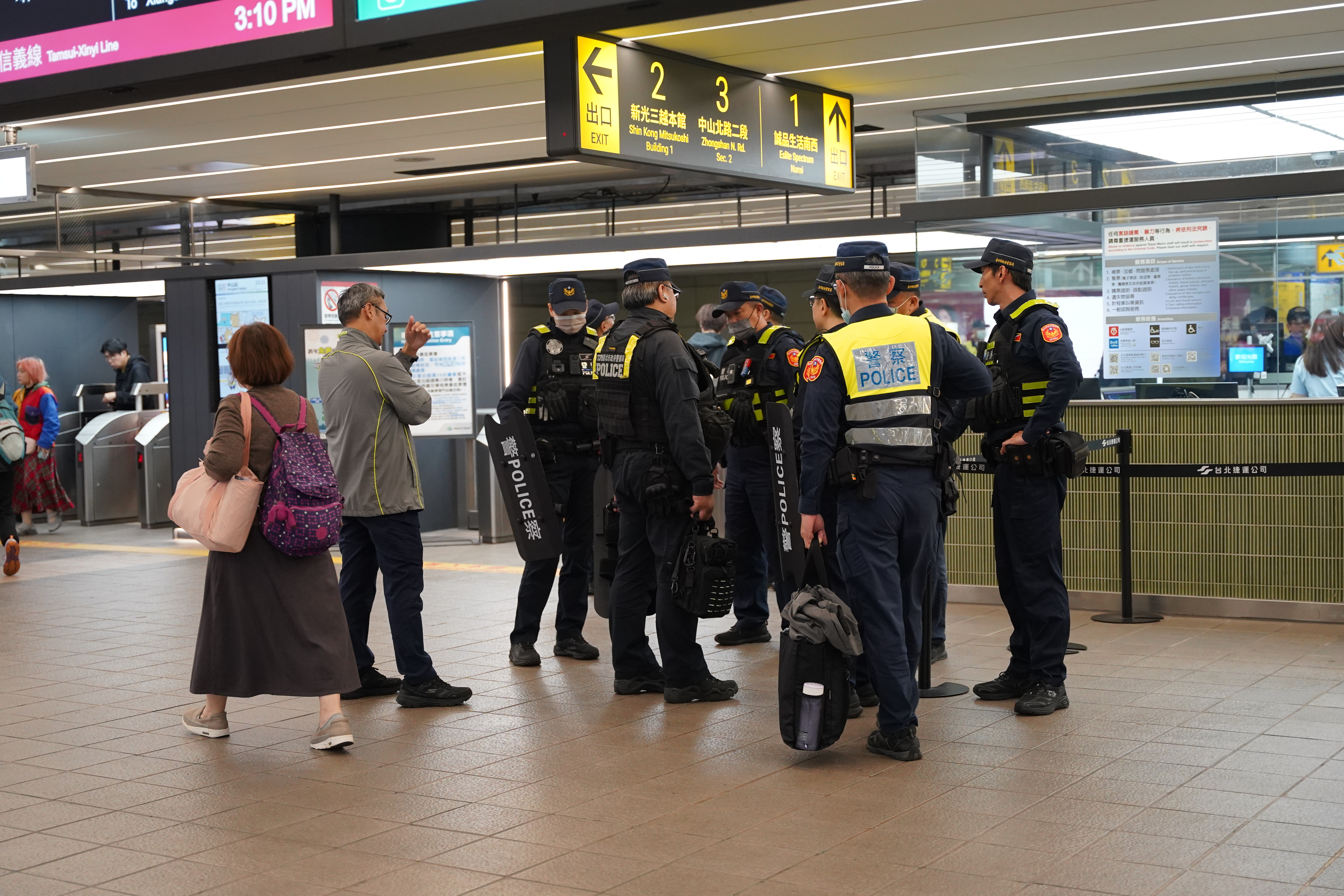
Heightened police patrols took place in the days immediately following the incident.

=== "No Notoriety" movement ===
In response to some media outlets publishing detailed reports on suspects' backgrounds and weapons used in violent attacks, some people in Taiwan have echoed the "No Notoriety" movement, which originated in discussions of mass shootings in the United States. Supporters argue that excessive attention to perpetrators may increase the risk of copycat violence, and have cited remarks by former New Zealand prime minister Jacinda Ardern following the Christchurch mosque shootings, in which she urged the public to name victims rather than the perpetrator, stating that he sought notoriety and that New Zealand would give him nothing—not even his name. Former television anchor Hsiao Tung-wen similarly called on the media and the public to avoid repeatedly mentioning the perpetrator's name.

Responding to these public calls, Taipei mayor Chiang Wan-an referred to the suspect as the "December 19 suspect" rather than using his name, stating that society should not give perpetrators any notoriety and should instead focus on victims and public safety.

Following the attack, commentators associated with the "No Notoriety" approach urged that public remembrance focus on victims and acts of heroism, particularly Yu Chia-chang (余家昶), who was killed while attempting to stop the assailant, rather than on the individual who carried out the attack.

== Reactions ==
On 23 December, Chang's parents made a public appearance outside of the funeral parlor where the autopsy of Chang had been performed. They wore face coverings and declined to provide their names. On behalf of both, the father apologized "to everyone" and recognized that "the heinous crimes committed by Chang Wen have caused serious harm to society and inflicted irreparable damage and suffering on the victims and their families." With police still seeking a motive to the premeditated attack, Chang's parents stated they would "fully cooperate with the judicial investigation." They then knelt down on the ground before bowing three times to a crowd of cameras.

Several foreign representative offices (de facto embassies) in Taiwan expressed condolences. The American Institute in Taiwan (AIT) extended sympathies to the victims and their families, commending first responders and stating solidarity with the people of Taiwan. The Canadian Trade Office in Taipei said it was shocked and saddened, offering heartfelt condolences and wishing recovery to the injured. The United Kingdom's representative to Taiwan also expressed condolences. The Singapore Trade Office in Taipei expressed its deepest sympathies while wishing a speedy recovery for the injured. The Czech Economic and Cultural Office in Taipei was saddened by the news of the stabbing and wrote in a post on Facebook, "We extend our sincere condolences and stand with the families and loved ones of those affected".

== See also ==
- 2014 Taipei Metro attack
- 2024 Taichung MRT attack
