= Crime in Taipei =

Taipei is considered one of the safest cities in the world. The crime rate of Taipei is 19.86, which is lower than many large cities such as Detroit (71.19), Atlanta, GA (66.18), Chicago (65.53), Delhi (58.85), Beijing (56.29), Rome (54.51), Paris (52.02), San Francisco (49.86), London (49.21), Dallas (45.22), New York City (44.49), Richmond, VA (41.97), Incheon (40.26), Seoul (37.17), Toronto (34.90), Amsterdam (33.43), Geneva (27.11), Copenhagen (22.76), and Hong Kong (21.97).

== Homicide ==
The amount of homicide in Taipei has been decreasing for the past 30 years. Even though Taipei is one of the safest cities in the world, there were still 68 homicides in 2017.

=== Previous incidents ===
In 1989, a soldier shot his girlfriend with a rifle because he thought she was cheating on him. He shot his girlfriend, her colleague, and himself. Although the police came to the scene promptly and sent the three to the hospital, none of them survived.

On April 28, 1992, an employee of a McDonald's in Taipei received a bomb threat over the telephone. The bomber demanded six million TWD as a ransom. Later that day, a TNT bomb was found in a McDonald's restroom. Unfortunately, the TNT exploded while the police were trying to defuse it.

=== Present ===
After the McDonald's bombings, the government made great efforts to reduce homicide. The year after the bombing, there were 196 homicides in Taipei, and the number decreased over the years and dropped to 68 in 2017.

On May 21, 2014, the 2014 Taipei Metro attack happened at Jiangzicui Station, resulting in four deaths and 24 injuries. The massacre was the first random attack for many years in Taiwan and sparked a prolonged discussion among politicians, social groups, and the media.

== Drugs ==
According to United Nations' World Drug Report, although Taiwan ranks very low for various drug issues among countries, Taipei suffers a higher drug abuse rate comparing to the rest of the country. New Taipei City accounts for half of the drug-related arrests in Taiwan in 2017. According to the Police Department of Taipei, 5578 people were arrested in 2017 because of drugs. According to a news article, around 60,000 people are using drugs in Taiwan, and the number has been stable for the past 4 years.

== Safe Area ==
Wanhua District and Zhongshan District have been considered as the most dangerous districts in Taipei. The amount of crime in these two districts is the highest.
