= Marc Jaffe =

American editor

Marc Jaffe (November 6, 1921 – December 31, 2023) was an American editor. He was the editorial director of Bantam Books and Ballantine Books and the founder of Villard Books.

The extensive and varied list of books Jaffe edited or acquired for publication includes The Catcher in the Rye, Jaws, The Exorcist, Man's Search for Meaning, Lewis and Clark Through Indian Eyes, the John Ciardi translation of Dante's Inferno, Shane and China Gate.
