= Organized crime in Taiwan =

Prevalent criminal organizations and activities in Taiwan

- Founding location: Taiwan
- Years active: 1950s–present
- Territory: Taiwan; active in mainland China, Southeast Asia, United States
- Ethnicity: Primarily Han Chinese
- Membership (est.): 10,000+
- Criminal activities: Human trafficking, racketeering, drug trafficking, extortion, murder, robbery, smuggling, arms trafficking, gambling, prostitution, money laundering, fraud, financial crime

Organized crime in Taiwan refers to the activities of criminal syndicates in Taiwan. The organized crime societies, often referred to as triads or gangs, are involved in racketeering, drug trafficking, assassination, and various other illegal activities. The three largest triads in Taiwan are Bamboo Union, Four Seas Gang, and Heavenly Way Gang. In modern times, triads in Taiwan have been investigated for connections to the government of the People's Republic of China.

== Terminology ==
In Taiwan, the criminal underworld is commonly referred to as heidao (Chinese: 黑道; lit. 'black way'), heibang (Chinese: 黑幫; lit. 'black gang'), or heishehui (Chinese: 黑社會; lit. 'black society'). Members of organized crime are colloquially called xiongdi (Chinese: 兄弟), whereas a leader or chief is sometimes called dage (Chinese: 大哥; lit. 'big brother').

== History ==
The development of modern organized triads in Taiwan largely goes back to the 1950s following the retreat of the Republic of China to Taiwan. The Four Seas Gang was founded in 1954 and is the second largest gang in Taiwan with 46 branches and over 700 known members. The Bamboo Union was formed by waishengren children of Kuomintang soldiers who wanted to consolidate power against Hoklo Taiwanese. The first members lived on Zhulin Road (Chinese: 竹林; lit. 'bamboo forest') in what is now Yonghe District in New Taipei City. It was established in 1957.

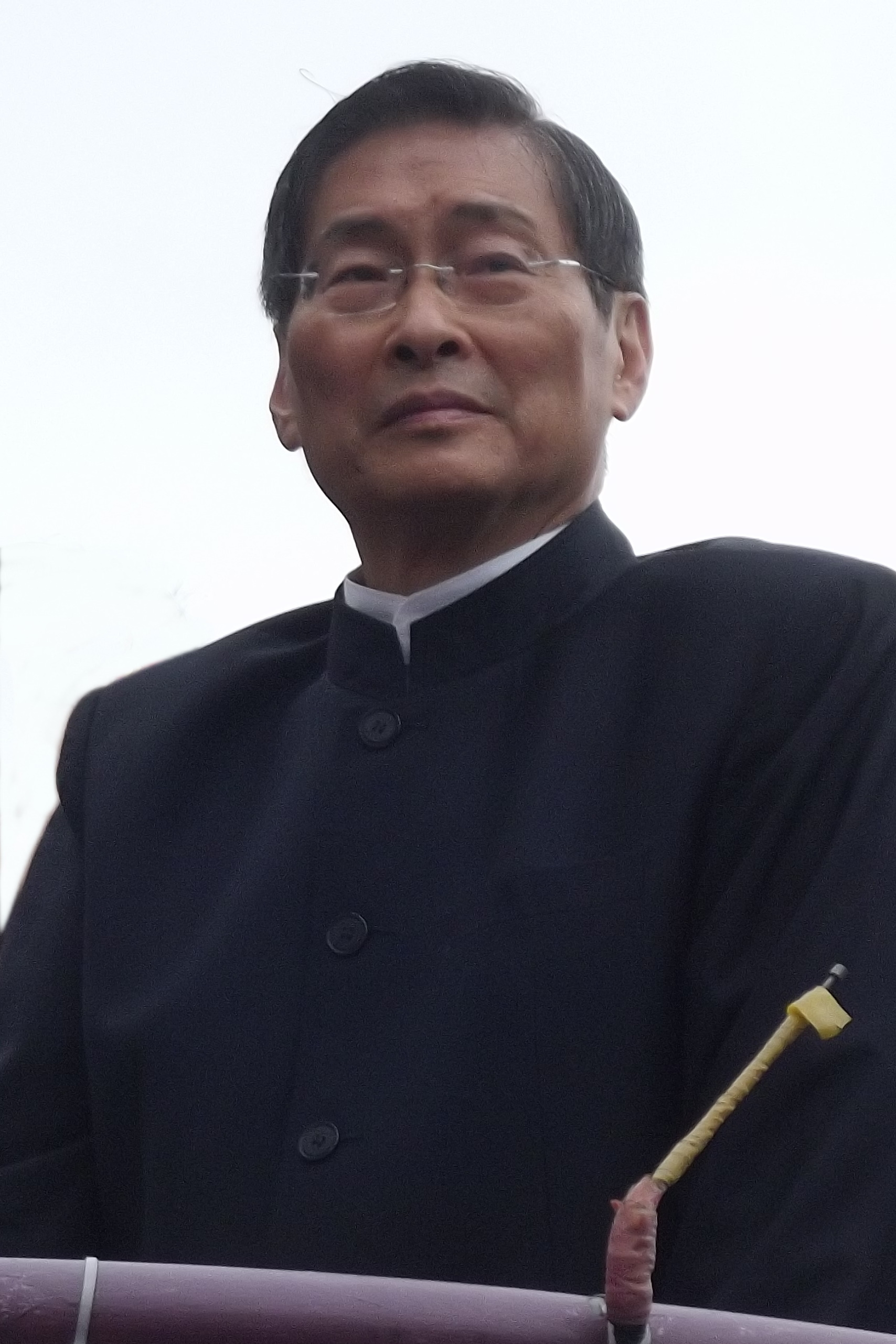
Chang An-lo, former leader of the Bamboo Union

In 2020, declassified documents showed that the Bamboo Union had close ties with the Kuomintang (KMT) government and Chiang Kai-shek family during the martial law period known as White Terror. Between 1960 and 1984, Bamboo Union members held up to 19 top government positions, including posts in the National Security Bureau, all branches of the armed forces, and the Ministry of Justice Investigation Bureau. Former leader Chang An-lo confirmed the 1984 plot to assassinate writer Henry Liu after his publication of an unauthorized biography of president Chiang Ching-kuo. He recounted that intelligence bureau chief Wang Hsi-ling sent gangsters Chen Chi-li and Wu Dun to assassinate Liu, though according to another account, Chiang Hsiao-wu dispatched the gangsters.

In response to the public outcry over Liu's murder, the government carried out Operation Clean Sweep, a widespread crackdown that led to the arrest of 2,346 gangsters and confiscation of large quantities of guns and knives. Small-time jiaotou boss Lo Fu-chu was imprisoned and suffered at the hands of other gangs. Three years later, in 1986, Lo created an alliance of local jiaotou gangs named the Heavenly Way Gang (Chinese: 天道盟), now the third largest gang, as a benshengren response to the waishengren-dominated gangs.

After martial law was lifted in 1987, organized crime saw a surge in the supply of smuggled guns and drugs, resulting from a reduction in maritime patrols. Mob infiltration of business and politics became more common in the 1990s.

In recent years, gang groups have expanded operations "by engaging in telecom fraud, online gambling, cross-border money laundering, arms and drugs trafficking, and other crimes" according to government officials. In a committee briefing, interior minister Lin Yu-chang noted that crackdowns on gang activity have identified 1,180 crime organizations across the country, with 755 businesses operated by gangs. Taiwan's Ministry of the Interior stated in 2017 that China's Ministry of State Security operates an "external liaison office" in Xiamen which communicates with and provides financial assistance to organized criminal groups in Taiwan.

== International activity ==
In 2008, the Bamboo Union was ranked by Foreign Policy as one of the world's most dangerous gangs. It was linked to the kidnapping of Hong Kong businessman Wong Yuk-kwan in 2015.

Taiwanese gangs have also been linked to human trafficking schemes in Southeast Asian countries like Cambodia and Myanmar. In 2022, Taiwanese law enforcement reported over 80 individuals were scammed into going to Cambodia that year. Victims are then coerced into committing wire fraud.

== In popular culture ==
The 1983 American crime novel China Gate chronicles the activities of the Taiwanese underworld from the end of World War II to the U.S. recognition of Mainland China in 1979. Though the novel opens with a disclaimer that its story is total fiction, it was widely praised at the time for its authenticity. The Portland Oregonian claimed that "though fiction... truth is ever present in its plot..."; and with its "connection between Chinese organized crime and American politics in the Far East", unfolding "on a large and believable scale over thirty years", the novel cannot help but establish "a tantalizing touch of exposé".

The Taiwanese film Monga (2010) depicts organized criminal activity, such as prostitution, in 1980s Wanhua District. Netflix series The Brothers Sun (2024) starring Michelle Yeoh is also in the gangster genre that portrays the organized crime underworld of Taiwan.

Funerals of crime bosses have become a cultural phenomenon, often covered in national media. The funeral of a Tainan local boss was attended by 3,000 alleged gang members, mostly from Taipei. Law enforcement speculated that these visiting groups aimed to use the occasion as a way to recruit members for their respective gangs. In 2023, a YouTube video of a crime boss's 2019 funeral reached over a million views. Criminal Investigation Bureau police asked the site to take down the video, on the grounds that gangs may use it to recruit youth members.

== See also ==
- Black gold (politics)
- Jianghu
- Law enforcement in Taiwan
- Crime in Taipei
