= 2024 Taichung MRT attack =

Attempted stabbing murder in Taiwan

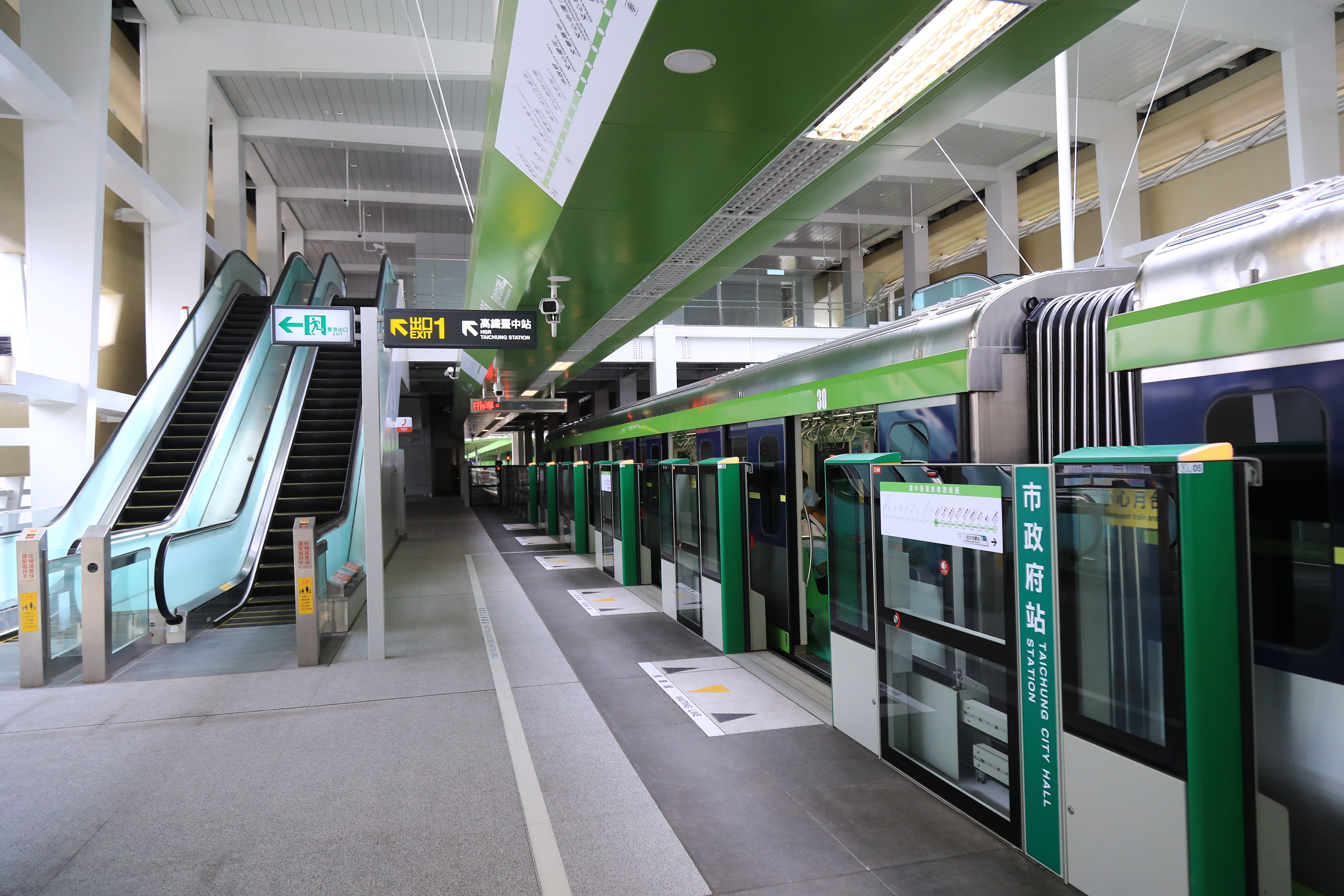
- Taichung City Hall Station platform
- Location: Taichung MRT Green line (between Shui-an Temple and Taichung City Hall), Taichung, Taiwan
- Date: 21 May 2024; 11:15 (National Standard Time; UTC+08:00)
- Target: Passengers of Taichung MRT
- Attack type: Stabbing
- Weapon: Knives
- Deaths: 0
- Injuries: 3 (including the suspect)
- Perpetrator: Hung Ching
- Motive: Dissatisfaction with society due to familial and academic reasons

On 21 May 2024, a stabbing took place on a Taichung MRT train, near Taichung City Hall station. Three people, including the attacker, were injured. The attack occurred exactly ten years after the 2014 Taipei Metro attack.

== Attack and immediate responses ==
The attacker entered Shui-an Temple Station at 11:03, boarded the train at 11:14, and began the attack at 11:15. After the train stopped at Taichung City Hall at 11:16, the attack was reported to the Taichung City Government Fire Bureau at 11:17. The attacker carried three knives, the first of which, a meat cleaver, was wrestled from him early by an elderly passenger. A 17-year-old victim was lacerated in the chest, shoulder and arm. The other victim, a 27-year-old male, was sustained a 15-cm slashing wound from his cheek to his jaw while attempting to stop the attack. The attacker injured his fingers. The injured were treated at Lin Shin Hospital. Between 11:20 and 15:10, authorities conducted an investigation. It is estimated that 17 passengers, including three foreign nationals, intervened in the attack.

In response to the attack, Taichung Mass Rapid Transit merged traffic from Wenxin Chongde and Wenxin Yinghua stations onto one track, while operations at Taichung City Hall station were suspended and restored by 15:30.

== Investigation and legal actions ==
Authorities collected three knives at the scene. An early investigation led by Taichung City Police Department's Sixth Precinct determined that the attacker was a nursing student in Kaohsiung, and had checked into a motel room in Xitun District, Taichung, the day before the stabbing. The attacker had arrived in Taichung without notifying his family of his travel plans. After relatives had been informed of the attack, they traveled to Taichung.

Police sent the case to the Taichung District Prosecutor's Office. The assailant, 20-year-old Hung Ching, informed investigators that he was unhappy with Taiwanese society, sought to make his displeasure known via a killing, and chose the date coinciding with the 2014 Taipei Metro attack.

The Taichung District Court sentenced Hung to ten years imprisonment on 26 December 2024. The Taichung High Court reduced Hung's sentence by three months in an April 2025 ruling, after he and the 17-year-old victim had reached a settlement. Hung appealed to the Supreme Court, which upheld the High Court ruling in August 2025.

== Aftermath and reactions ==
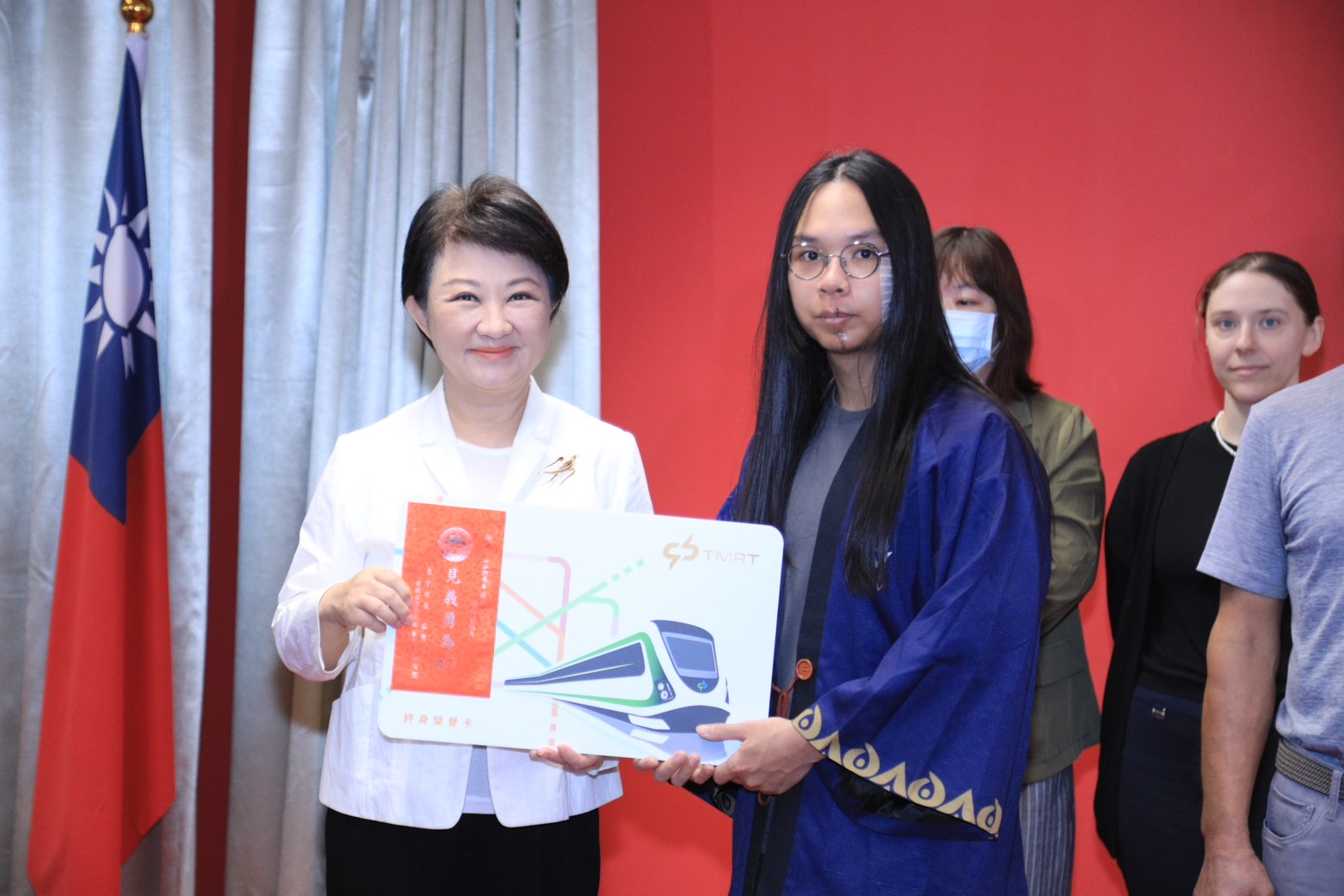
Taichung Mayor Lu Shiow-yen commending "Long-Haired Man", 27-year-old Hsu Jui-hsien (right).

The 27-year old stabbing victim, Hsu Jui-hsien recovered after surgery. He, the 17-year-old and seven other passengers were awarded free rides on the Taichung MRT for life by mayor Lu Shiow-yen, who also stated that the Taichung City Government would pay medical fees for the victims. The teenage victim's father planned to raise NT$2 million and use the funds to purchase shields and batons for the Taichung MRT. Upon meeting with Lu Shiow-yen, Hsu wore Monster Hunter clothes and cited lines from Frieren, specifically crediting the Frieren character Himmel as an inspiration to overturn the preconception of otaku subculture. His action quickly incited discussions among the local anime fandom.

All nine honored passengers were given monetary awards for their actions: four people, including Hsu, received NT$20,000 for directly engaging and subduing the attacker, two received NT$8,000 for providing aid after the attacker was subdued by helping in the restrainment and disarming, while three others received NT$5,000 for providing law enforcement with assistance and helping keep order in the immediate aftermath.

During the attack, Taichung Mass Rapid Transit received two notifications from the emergency intercommunications system. However, they reported no response from passengers, and concluded that riders had been too panicked to reply. In turn, passengers claimed that they did not hear from the control center. As a result, Lu additionally vowed to improve the responsiveness of the intercom.

Following the attack, police in Kaohsiung increased the frequency of patrols in train cars, throughout major Kaohsiung Metro stations, and in areas surrounding metro stations. The Taipei City Government announced similar measures for the Taipei Metro.

Shortly before Tsai Ing-wen stepped down as president, Ministry of Justice officials in her administration had defended the death penalty to justices of the Constitutional Court. As the attack happened the day after she had been replaced by Lai Ching-te, Lai's justice minister Cheng Ming-chien commented on the further discussion of the death penalty inspired by this attack.
