= 2014 Taipei Metro attack =

Mass stabbing in New Taipei City, Taiwan

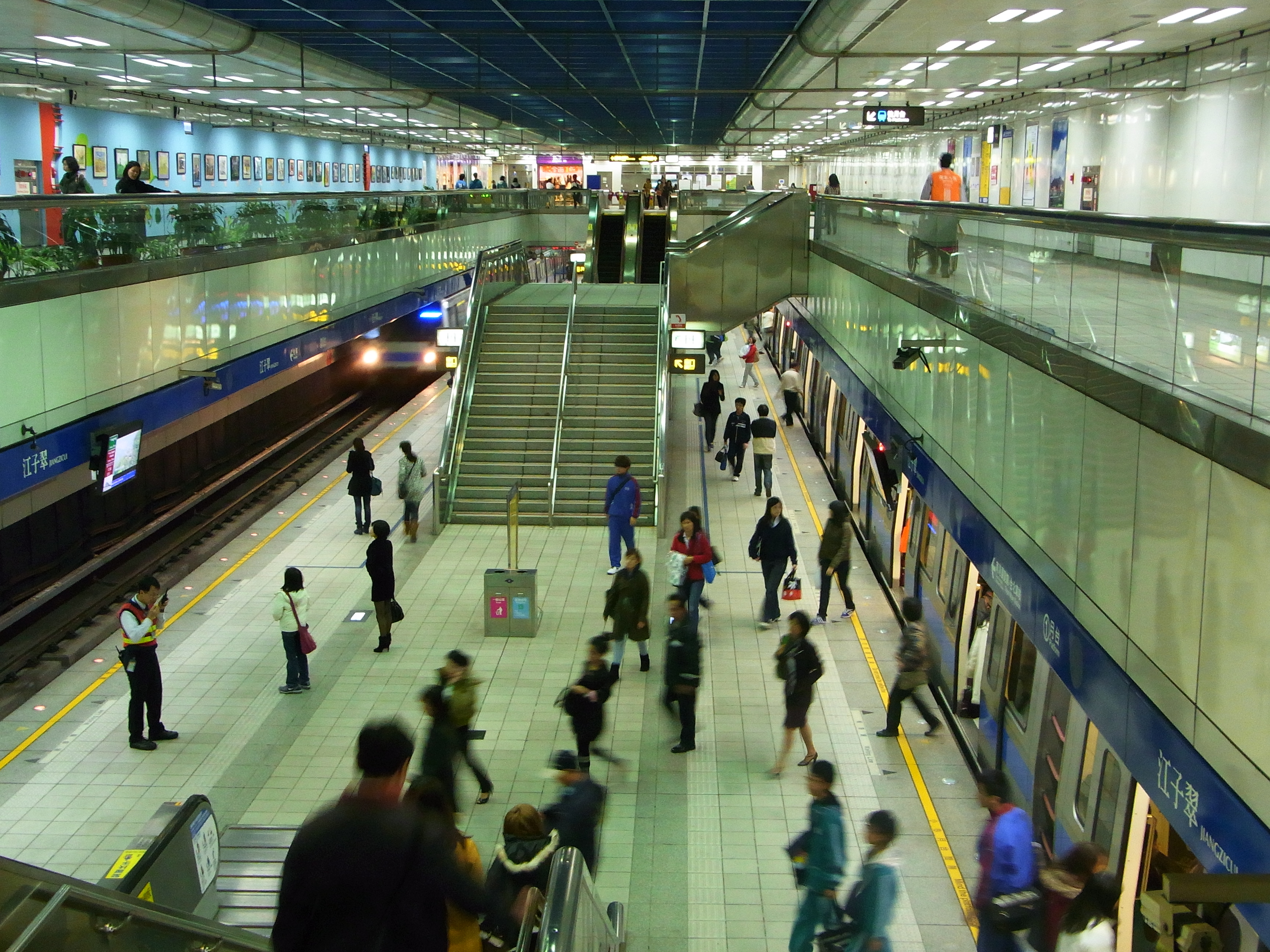
- Jiangzicui Station platform
- Location: 25°02′06″N 121°28′37″E; Taipei Metro Bannan Line (between Longshan Temple and Jiangzicui), New Taipei City, Taiwan
- Date: 21 May 2014; 12 years ago 16:25 (National Standard Time; UTC+08:00)
- Target: Passengers of Taipei Metro
- Attack type: Mass stabbing
- Weapons: Two fruit knives (one used); Swiss Army knife (unused)
- Deaths: 4
- Injuries: 24
- Perpetrator: Cheng Chieh
- Motive: Hatred towards two female elementary school classmates
- Convictions: Murder (4 counts); Attempted murder (22 counts)

On 21 May 2014, a mass stabbing took place on a Taipei Metro train near Jiangzicui Station in New Taipei City, Taiwan, resulting in four deaths and 24 injuries. It was the first fatal attack on the city's subway system since operations began in 1996. The attacker, 21-year-old Cheng Chieh, was arrested after the attack. He was sentenced to death, in addition to 144 years in prison, and was executed on 10 May 2016.

== Attack ==
The attack started at around 16:25 local time, inside a Taipei Metro C321 heading west on the Bannan line between Longshan Temple Station in Taipei and Jiangzicui Station in New Taipei City. The distance between the two stations is the longest between any two stations in the Taipei metro system, lasting three to five minutes. During the attack, the assailant chased and hacked passengers with a 30cm long fruit knife. Before the train could stop at Jiangzicui Station, a group of passengers banded together to distance themselves using umbrellas while others tried to discourage the attacker by loudly taunting him.

== Victims ==
The victims were two men and two women, identified by the New Taipei City Fire Department as 26-year-old National Cheng Kung University graduate student Chang Cheng-han (張正翰), (Note: traditional Chinese: 張正翰; simplified Chinese: 张正翰; pinyin: Zhāng Zhènghàn; Wade–Giles: Chang^{1} Chêng^{4} han^{4}) 28-year-old arcade worker Hsieh Ching-yun (解青雲), (Note: traditional Chinese: 解青雲; simplified Chinese: 解青云; pinyin: Jiě Qīngyún; Wade–Giles: Hsieh^{4} Chʻing^{1} yün^{2}) 52-year-old cleaner Pan Pi-chu (潘碧珠), (Note: Chinese: 潘碧珠; pinyin: Pān Bìzhū; Wade–Giles: P'an^{2} Pi^{4} chu^{1}) and 62-year-old retiree Lee Tsui-yun (李翠雲); (Note: traditional Chinese: 李翠雲; simplified Chinese: 李翠云; pinyin: Lǐ Cuìyún; Wade–Giles: Li^{3} Ts'ui^{4} yün^{2}) Pan was killed the day before her 53rd birthday. They were all taken to different hospitals in Taipei and New Taipei City, the department said. In addition, 24 others were wounded during the knife attack, 10 critically.

== Perpetrator ==
Cheng Chieh (鄭捷) (Note: traditional Chinese: 鄭捷; simplified Chinese: 郑捷; pinyin: Zhèng Jié; Wade–Giles: Cheng^{4} Chieh^{2}) was born 3 April 1993 in the Banqiao District, and attended schools in Taipei. He grew up with few friends and was extremely focused on his studies. Cheng was also interested in violent online games and had written horror stories.

In elementary school, Cheng threatened to kill classmates over small disagreements. In junior high school, he carried a knife for a month looking for a chance to stab his teacher. In high school, Cheng began blogging about his plans to kill and posted articles about murders. He enrolled in the Chung Cheng Institute of Technology in 2011 with the intention of receiving military training but was expelled two years later. He then transferred to Tunghai University. School officials there noticed Cheng's social media activity and offered him counseling before the incident, but no irregularities were discovered. At the time of the attack, Cheng still lived in the Banqiao District with his parents and younger brother.

After graduating from high school, Cheng enrolled in the Department of Power and Systems Engineering at the National Defense University; until June 2013 in the second semester of his sophomore year, when he was reprimanded by the school for failing to obtain more than half of the credits in that semester. He dropped out, and in September of the same year, he entered the second year of the Department of Environmental Engineering at Tunghai University, through the transfer exam. During the university's winter vacation in 2014, Cheng again applied to transfer to another school. He aimed to transfer to the Chinese literature department but failed the exam. Cheng's parents told the police that he had a lively personality in high school, and his personality changed after he dropped out of National Defense University.

== Aftermath ==
When the subway train arrived at Jiangzicui Station, a single suspected assailant was subdued by passengers, police and metro staff and taken to the nearby Haishan police station after a brief standoff. Taipei Mayor Hau Lung-pin said police presence on the metro was increased soon after the incident and added that he was requesting reinforcements from the National Police Agency.

On 22 May, the suspect was taken to the New Taipei District Prosecutors Office for questioning. A prosecutor applied to detain him in the New Taipei District Court, which was approved by a judge around 6:20 am. He was detained in the Taipei Detention Center located in Tucheng District, with an inmate number of 1892.

Trainset number 117/118, which was the setting of the stabbing attack, was temporarily withdrawn from service after arrival at Jiangzicui Station and underwent disinfection and change of seats. It was then renumbered 175/176 (173/174 was avoided as "一七三，一七四" (pinyin: yīqīsān, yīqīsì) sounds like "一起殺，一起死" (yīqǐ shā, yīqǐ sǐ), which literally means "kill together, die together") and returned to service in May 2015.

=== Questioning after attack ===
New Taipei City Police Chief Chen Kuo-en identified the suspected attacker as Cheng Chieh, a 21-year-old second-year student at Tunghai University in the central city of Taichung. Chief Chen said the suspect told police he had wanted to do something "shocking and big" and had plotted to carry out the attack from childhood. Chen said no other motive was presently known.

During questioning, the suspect said he originally intended to attack after his college graduation, but decided to move earlier since he had "no classes" on 21 May and he had grown tired of living. The suspect stated that he did not admit guilt, felt no regret, wanted the death sentence, and that even if his parents were on the train he attacked, he would have killed them, as well as the prosecutors questioning him.

== Reactions ==
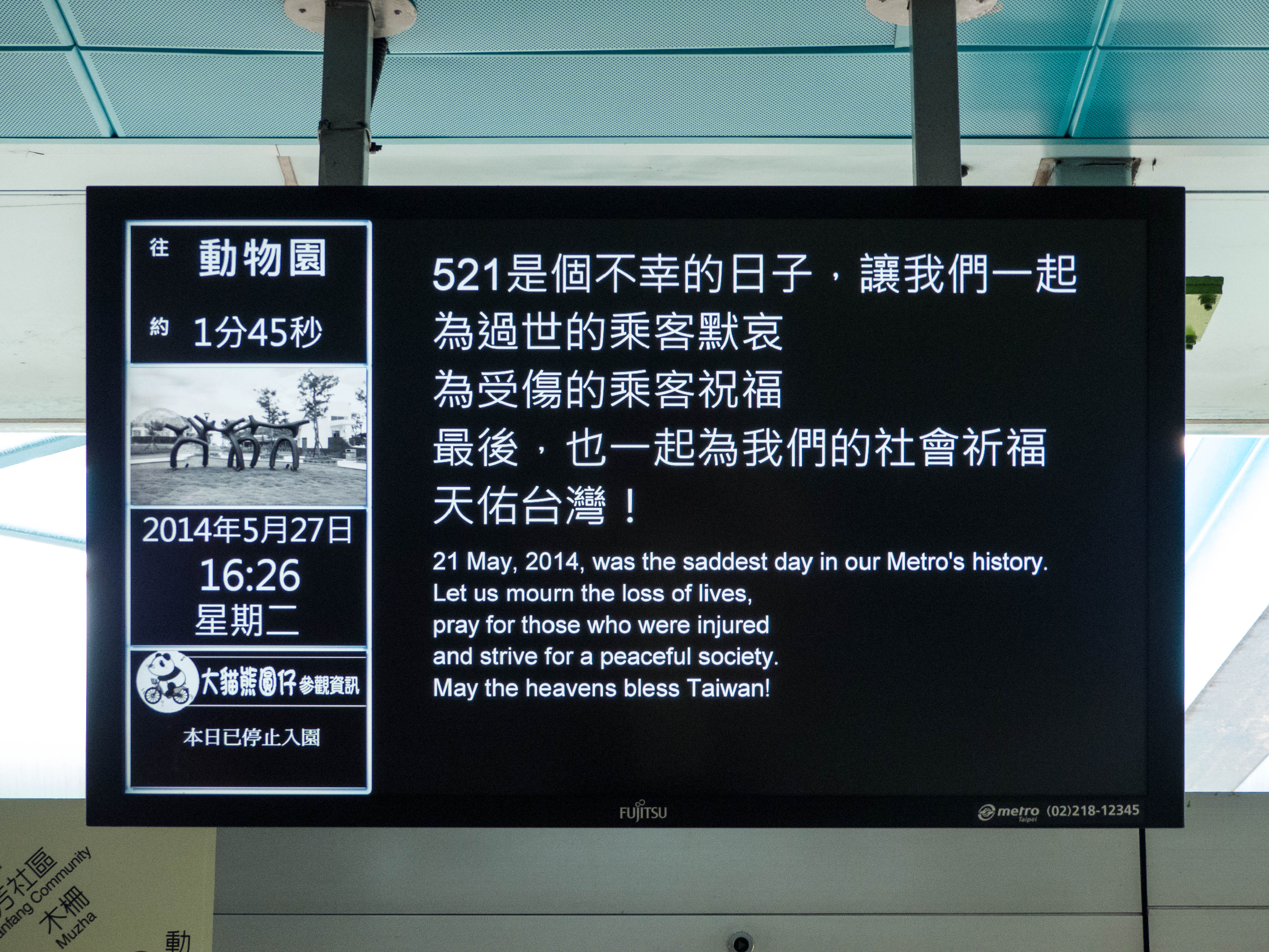
Condolence message displayed on a Taipei Metro Information television after the incident (shot on the Wenhu Line Station Platform). The English message is not a direct translation.

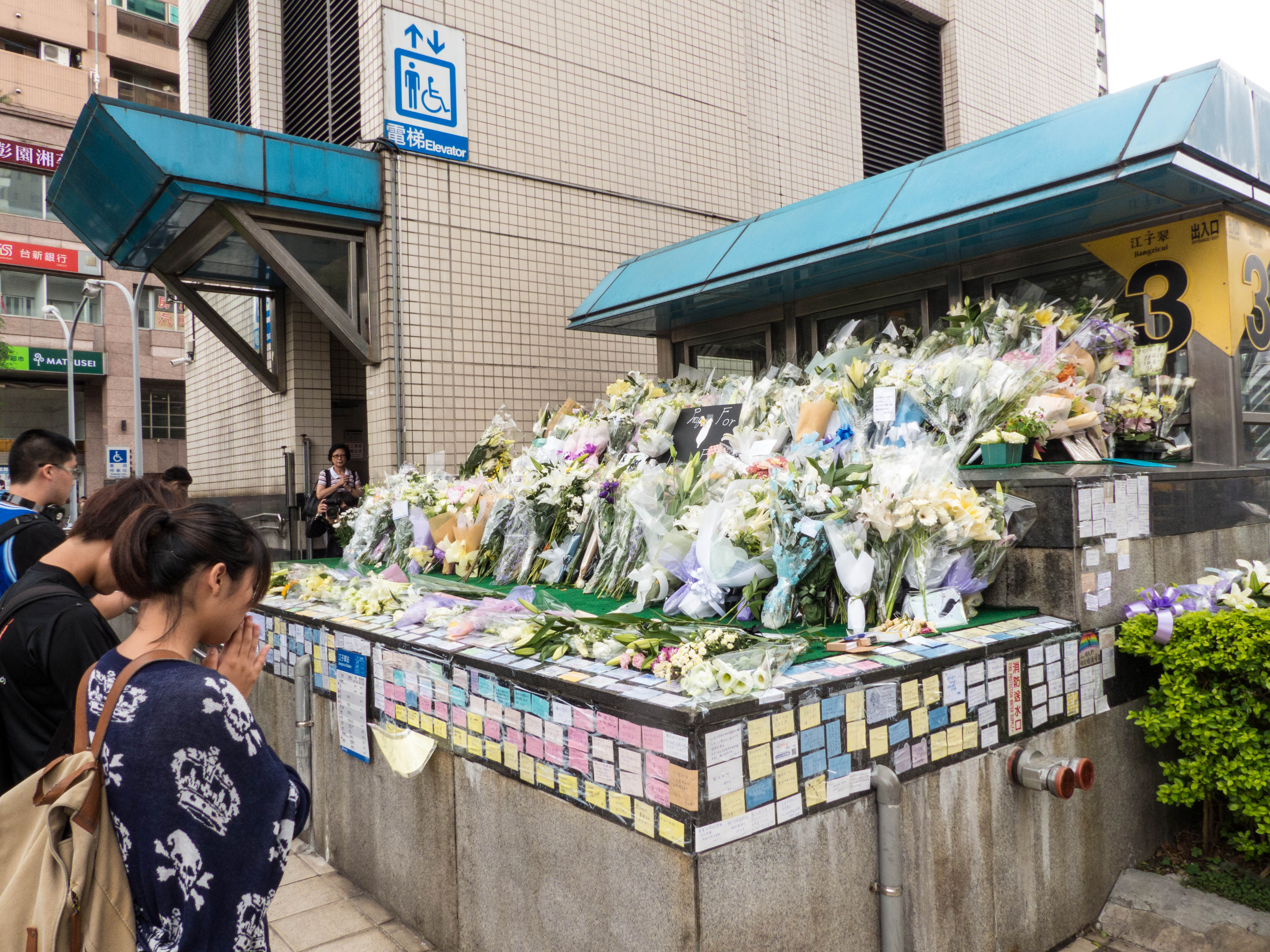
Tribute at Jiangzicui Station Exit 3

On the evening of 21 May, people began leaving flowers and cards at an exit of Jiangzicui Station to pay tribute to those who died in the attack.

On 22 May, President Ma Ying-jeou condemned the attack and ordered the National Police Agency to investigate what led a university student to stab four people to death on a crowded subway train. The Legislative Yuan on 23 May released a joint statement signed by all political parties calling for the National Police Agency to thoroughly re-examine and increase police deployment on metro systems, railways and airports. Taipei Mayor Hau Lung-bin announced that police officers from precincts in Taipei and New Taipei City are to be permanently deployed at each of the Taipei MRT commuter rail system's 109 stations.

General manager Tan Gwa-guang of the Taipei Rapid Transit Corporation stated that the company would pay the medical expenses of the victims and set aside NT$4 million to compensate their families. Taipei City Government also raised funds to use as compensation.

Tunghai University, where Cheng was a student, expressed sorrow at his actions and stated that "No matter what, Cheng will always be our family," urging students to show care for one another. They also promised to set up an expert committee to investigate the environment at the college.

Kuomintang legislator Chiang Huei-chen said the passengers had put themselves in danger by focusing on their smartphones, while another KMT legislator, Lin Te-fu, said the passengers should have quickly pressed the emergency alert button in the train and that the passengers lacked common sense. These remarks sparked a public outcry against the legislators.

The incident has sparked a debate online about whether the death penalty is appropriate punishment for such attacks. A Facebook group named "Indefinitely supporting death penalty for Cheng Chieh" had over 32,000 "likes" as of 22 May 2014. Lin Hsin-yi, executive director of the Taiwan Alliance to End the Death Penalty, said that the most important thing at present is for the public to think about how to help the victims of the metro slashing spree and ease the survivors and their relatives out of the suffering brought about by the tragedy.

On 27 May, Cheng Chieh's parents publicly apologized at Jiangzicui Station and called for a quick death sentence for their son. Cheng's parents told the media that he liked to play violent fighting games, and when he was interrogated by the police, Cheng said that the games he liked to play were League of Legends and Tower of Saviors, both of which are "fighting type" video games; the Taiwanese operational team for League of Legends issued a statement saying that its game had nothing to do with Cheng's motive for the murder, and the company behind Tower of Saviors also stated that the product is a match-three game, which had nothing to do with the crime.

== Trial ==
Cheng was indicted by the New Taipei District Prosecutors Office on 21 July, and charged with four counts of murder and 22 counts of attempted murder. The prosecution was led by Chen Po-chun. The Taipei Rapid Transit Corporation, the company that runs the Taipei Metro, claimed that ridership was down by 945,000 within ten days of Cheng's actions, causing them to lose NT$20.61 million, an amount for which they sued Cheng.

Cheng was found guilty of four counts of murder and 22 counts of attempted murder on 6 March 2015 in the Taiwan New Taipei District Court. For each count of murder, he was sentenced to death and deprivation of citizen's rights for life; for each count of attempted murder, he was sentenced to a jail term of between five years, two months and eight years. His knife was also confiscated. On 7 August, the New Taipei District Court ordered Cheng to pay approximately NT$30 million to ten victims of the attack. His death sentence was appealed to the Taiwan High Court, which upheld the ruling. In a separate ruling on 7 January 2016, the High Court determined that Cheng owed another NT$61.39 million to victims and their families. In February 2016, Cheng was granted permission to attend the Supreme Court proceedings for his final appeal of the death sentence. Cheng became the first defendant subject to a death penalty to appear in front of the Supreme Court when his appeal was heard in April 2016. The court's final decision, to uphold all previous rulings, was issued on 22 April. Cheng's criminal penalties included a total of 144 years imprisonment and four death sentences.

=== Execution ===
Justice Minister Luo Ying-shay signed the execution order for Cheng at 17:00 on 10 May 2016. Cheng was executed at 20:47 on the same day. After eating his last meal, a biandang with stewed pork, rice and vegetables, Cheng was given general anesthesia. Soon after its administration, he was laid in a prone position and shot in the heart three times. The 18-day gap between Cheng's final guilty verdict and execution was the shortest in Taiwanese judicial history.

== See also ==
- 2024 Taichung Metro attack, occurred exactly 10 years later.
- 2025 Taipei stabbings
- Crime in Taiwan
