= Taiwan McDonald's bombings =

Bombing incidents

Taiwan McDonald's Bombings
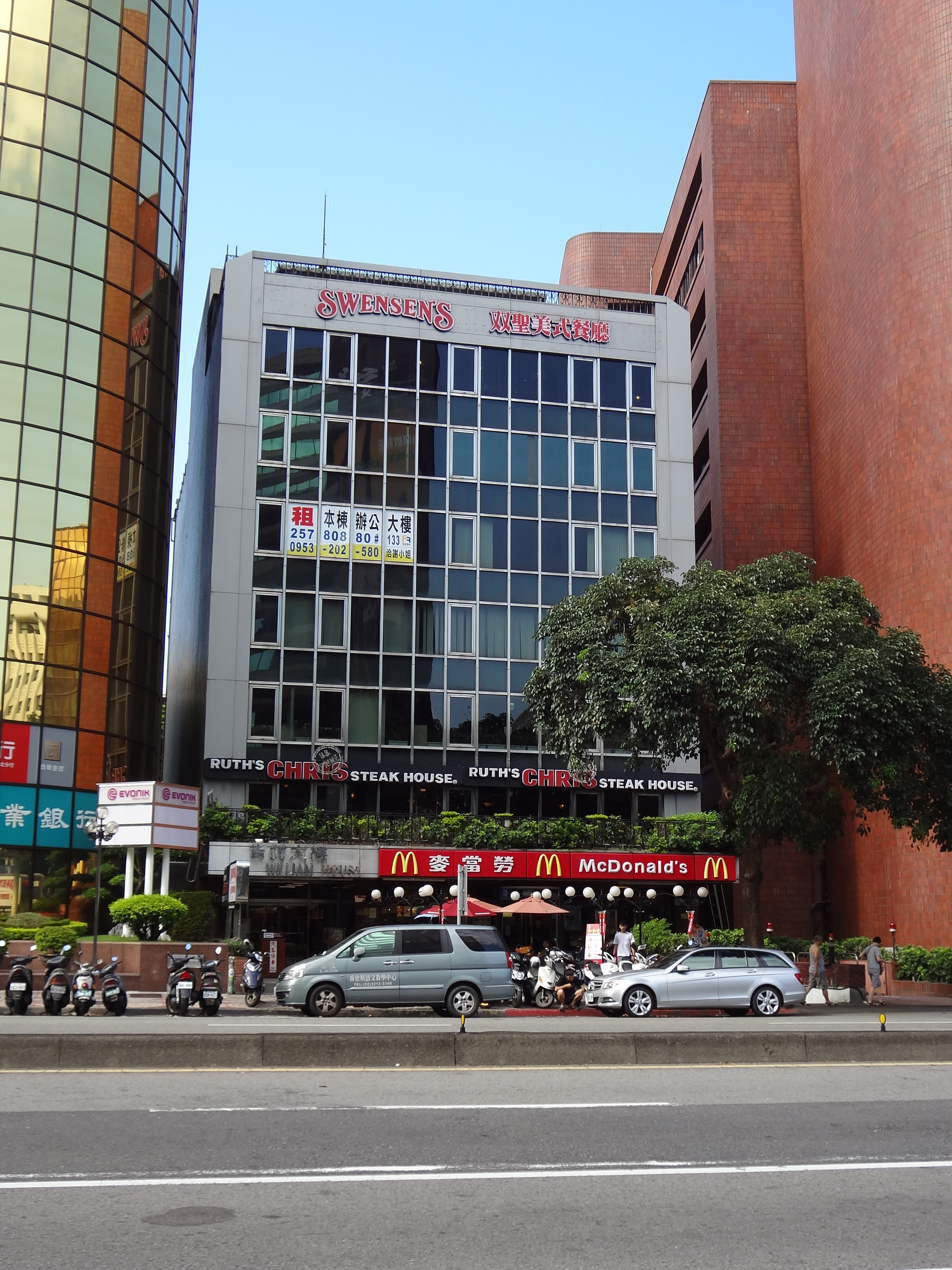
- William House on Minsheng East Road in Taipei, where the first McDonald's location opened in Taiwan (pictured in 2015)
- Location: Multiple McDonald's Restaurants, Taiwan
- Date: April 28 - April 29, 1992
- Attack type: Bombing
- Weapon: Explosive device
- Deaths: 1
- Injuries: 4
- Perpetrators: Chen Hsi-Hsieh, Pan Che-Ming
- Motive: Extortion plot
- Convictions: Life imprisonment (Chen), 15 years imprisonment (Pan)

The Taiwan McDonald's bombings (Chinese: 麥當勞爆炸案; pinyin: màidāngláo bàozhà àn; lit. 'McDonald's bombing incidents') occurred on April 28 and 29, 1992. Bombs were planted in or near various McDonald's restaurant franchises in Taiwan. The bombings – part of an extortion attempt – caused the death of a policeman and injuries to four civilians including two young children, and resulted in the temporary closure of certain McDonald's locations in Taiwan.

Two people were subsequently convicted of involvement in the bombings, with the bomber themselves being sentenced to life imprisonment.

== Bombings ==
The first bomb exploded at a restaurant in Taipei on the afternoon of April 28, 1992. A device had been located in the male toilets in the restaurant and the bomb squad were in attendance at the time. The bomb went off as it was either being removed from the restaurant or as an attempt was being made to defuse it in situ. The resulting explosion killed one bomb squad officer. Later that day another bomb exploded in a telephone booth outside a McDonald's in Kaohsiung in the south of the country. The devices were found to have been triggered by mercury tilt switches.

That evening, police found a soft-drink bottle in a Taipei parking lot containing an anonymous letter demanding NT$6 million (US$240,000) from McDonald's and stating that six bombs would be planted at McDonald's restaurants. Another device was found nearby.

On April 29, another bomb detonated in the Taipei suburb of Yonghe. The device had again been found in the men's room and detonated as it was being examined by the restaurant manager, leaving them in a critical condition and hospitalising another employee. Flying glass from the explosion also injured two children.

== Response ==
On April 29, Taiwan McDonald's Corp announced the indefinite closure of 49 of its restaurants and offered a NT$12 million ($480,000) reward for assistance in finding those responsible for the bombings. The firm also said that it was working closely with police to improve security at its restaurants after which they would reopen. A total reward of NT$22 million ($880,000) was made available.

McDonald's began reopening its restaurants in Taiwan on May 3. Initially only nine branches reopened. The reopened restaurants featured enhanced security measures including CCTV cameras, metal detectors and searches of patrons by security guards.

== Convictions ==
On May 16, Chen Hsi-Hsieh, a plumber, and Pan Che-Ming were arrested and charged with murder and extortion by the local prosecutor, who demanded the death penalty for both.

Chen was convicted of murder and extortion and sentenced to life in prison by a Taipei District Court on November 25, 1992. His accomplice Pan was sentenced to 15 years and six months for providing the explosives and harboring Chen. The presiding judge explained that they had not used the death penalty as they did not believe that Chen and Pan really intended to kill, demonstrated by them leaving a note for police explaining how to defuse the devices.

== See also ==
- Extortion
