= Gender mainstreaming =

Practice of considering impacts on men and women of proposed public policy

Gender mainstreaming is the public policy concept of assessing the implications for people of different genders of a planned policy action, including legislation and programmes.

The concept of gender mainstreaming was first proposed at the 1985 Third World Conference on Women and has subsequently been pushed in the United Nations development community. The idea was formally featured in 1995 at the Fourth World Conference on Women, and was cited in the document that resulted from the conference, the Beijing Platform for Action.

== Definition ==
Most definitions of gender mainstreaming conform to the UN Economic and Social Council formally defined concept:

Mainstreaming a gender perspective is the process of assessing the implications for women and men of any planned action, including legislation, policies or programmes, in all areas and at all levels. It is a strategy for making women's as well as men's concerns and experiences an integral dimension of the design, implementation, monitoring and evaluation of policies and programmes in all political, economic and societal spheres so that women and men benefit equally and inequality is not perpetuated. The ultimate goal is to achieve gender equality.

There are different approaches to gender mainstreaming:

Institutional perspective: The ways in which specific organizations adopt and implement mainstreaming policies. This will often involve an analysis of how national politics intersects with international norms and practices.

Discursive perspective: Queries the ways in which mainstreaming reproduces power relations through language and issue-framing. This approach will often involve looking at documents, resolutions and peace agreements to see how they reproduce the narratives of gender in a political context.

These approaches are not necessarily competing, and can be seen as complementary.

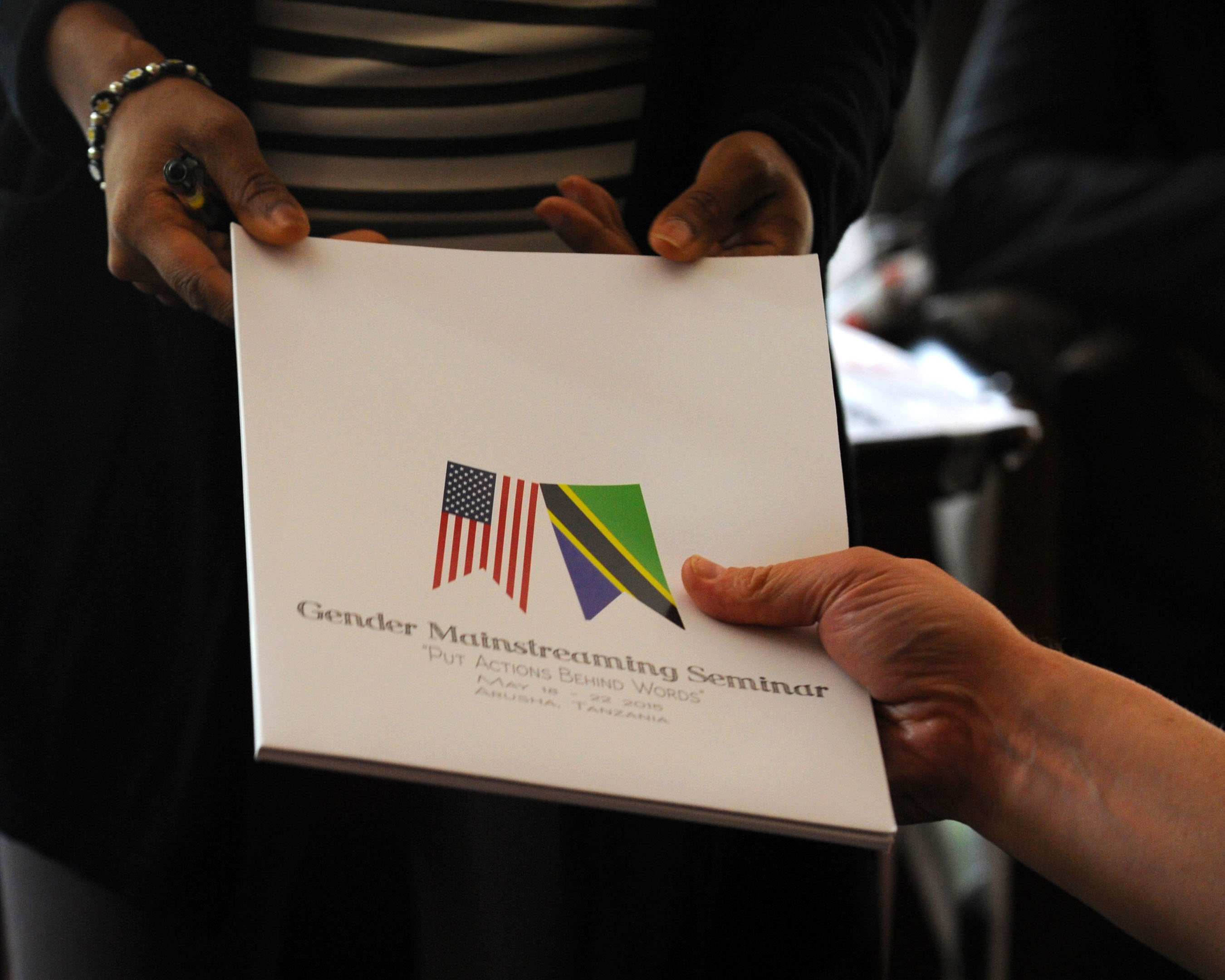
Gender Mainstreaming Seminar 2015

The ways in which approaches are used, however, can also reflect differing feminist theories. For example, liberal feminism is strongly invoked by mainstreaming through the binary approach of gender in strict relation to the public sphere of policymaking. Poststructuralist feminism can be seen in mainstreaming thought which seeks to displace gender difference as the sole axis of difference and to highlight the diversity of policy and its ramifications.

== Principles ==
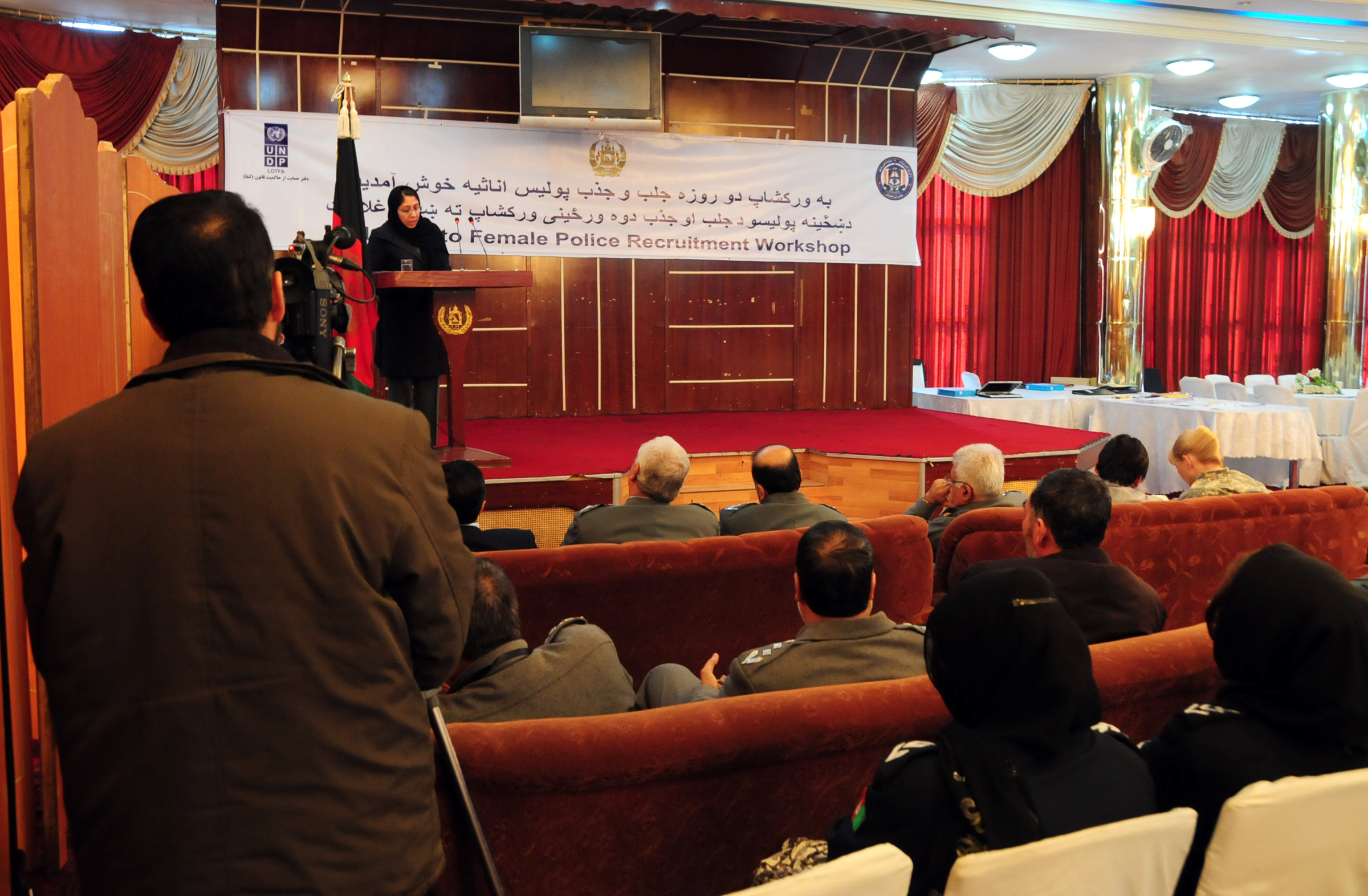
Col. Shafiqa Quraishi, Director of the Afghan National Police Gender Mainstreaming Unit, speaks at an ANP female recruiting conference covered how to recruit and train the additional 5,000 women that Afghan President Hamid Karzai has mandated be added to the police force by 2014.

=== Prioritizing gender equality ===
Gender mainstreaming tries, among others, to ascertain a gender equality perspective across all policy areas. According to Jacqui True, a Professor of politics and international relations, "[e]very policy or piece of legislation should be evaluated from the perspective of whether or not it reduces or increases gender inequalities." This concept of gender equality is not limited to formal equality, it includes as well equality de facto, which is a more holistic approach to gender policy in order to tackle the interconnected causes that create an unequal relation between the sexes in all areas of life (work, politics, sexuality, culture, and violence).

Lombardo notes that "[t]here should be evidence that gender equality objective and policies of special concern for women (for example, social policy) have been prioritized in the organization among competing objectives (in terms of financial and human resources, type of measures adopted, voting systems used, and so forth)."

=== Incorporating gender into politics and decision making ===
Puechguirbal takes a discursive approach to argue that in order to successfully mainstream a gendered perspective in politics, language needs to be reevaluated and used to change the parameters of how women are perceived.

Historically, documents concerning international agreements, peacekeeping arrangements and legal resolutions have perpetuated stereotypes that disempower women. This can be seen through the use of language, even as simply as in the UN Disarmament, Demobilization and Reintegration program's (DDR) motto: 'One man, on weapon'.

Reference of gender issues should be found in all policy areas. "There must be evidence that the mainstream political agenda has been reoriented by rethinking and rearticulating policy ends and means from a gender perspective," Lombardo says, referencing Rounaq Jahan, a political scientists, feminist leader and author. As the Beijing Platform for Action states, "women's equal participation in political life plays a pivotal role in the general process of the advancement of women."

Further, according to the Beijing Platform for Action "[w]ithout the active participation of women and the incorporation of women's perspective at all levels of decision-making, the goals of equality, development and peace cannot be achieved." Therefore, Lombardo claims that women and men should be equally represented in any decision-making institution. Charlesworth agrees and believes that every effort should be made to broaden women's participation at all levels of decision-making.

==== Post-conflict peace-building (PCPB) ====
An area of policy and decision making that will particularly benefit from gender mainstreaming is post-conflict peace-building, also known as PCPB. Various feminist research has concluded that men and women experience violent conflict differently and moreover, the current policies surrounding PCPB are insufficient in addressing the disadvantaged position of women in male-dominated power structures that are further reinforced by peace-building efforts, both from the domestic and international communities. Gender mainstreaming in PCPB would emphasize the importance of gendered considerations of particular issues that disproportionally affect women in post-conflict settings. This would mean that policy reflected an acknowledgment of the many instances of wartime sexualized violence perpetrated on women, among other issues that (primarily) women face during conflict. A major focus of the effort towards gender mainstreaming in post-conflict peace-building policy is to lessen the international community's inclination towards building a return to 'normal' for the post-conflict region. Much of feminist research has found that returning to 'normal' is of little comfort for women, who were burdened by the patriarchal systems that were in place before conflict broke out. As Handrahan notes, the international community involved in much of PCPB "tolerates high levels of violence against women in their own societies." Policy that prioritized gender in its applications and goals would seek to build a society where women are better off than they were before conflict broke out.

=== Shifts in institutional culture ===
Gender mainstreaming can be seen as a process of organizational change. Gender mainstreaming must be institutionalized through concrete steps, mechanisms, and processes in all parts of the organization. According to Lombardo, this change involves three aspects: policy process, policy mechanisms; and policy actors. She explains as follows:

"1. A shift in policy process means that the process "is reorganized so that ordinary actors know how to incorporate a gender perspective" or that gender expertise is included "as normal requirement for policy-makers" (Council of Europe 1998, 165).

2. A shift in policy mechanism involves (a) the adoption of horizontal cooperation on gender issues across all policy areas, levels, and departments; and (b) the use of appropriate policy tools and techniques to integrate the gender variable in all policies and to monitor and evaluate all policies from a gender perspective.

3. The range of policy actors participating in the policy-making process is broadened to include, apart from policy-makers and civil servants, gender experts and civil society."

== Gender budgeting ==
Gender budgeting encompasses activities and initiatives aiming at the preparation of budgets or the analysis of policies and budgets from a gender perspective. It can also be referred to as gender-sensitive budgeting or gender-responsive budgeting. Gender budgeting does not aim at creating separate budgets for women, or only increasing spending on women’s programmes. It is rather concerned with addressing budgetary gender inequality concerns, as for instance, how gender hierarchies influence budgets, and gender-based unpaid or low paid work.

== Examples ==
As Jacqui True says, "[m]ainstreaming was established as a global strategy for achieving gender equality, and in turn for achieving sustainable economic development in the 1995 Beijing Platform for Action ratified by all United Nations member states. It is now incumbent upon nation-states and international organizations to carry out gender mainstreaming. As such, mainstreaming has achieved widespread endorsement by individual governments, regional supra-state bodies." What follows is a non-exhaustive list of examples of these endorsements.

=== Nicaragua ===
The election of 1990 in Nicaragua brought to office the first female president in the Americas. On April 25, 1990, Violeta Chamorro became the first and only woman to defeat a male incumbent presentment. This helped to change and mobilize mainstream gender structure within Nicaragua. In 1993 the existing outdated Sandinista Women's organization, the Nicaraguan Institute for Research on Women, was revitalized and renamed by the Chamorro government as the Nicaraguan Institute for Woman (INIM). This was to encourage the involvement of Nicaraguan women in the country's economic, social, cultural, and political development and to promote a change in mainstream gender constructs. More specifically, the INIM aims to institute in all sectors a system of gender-focus indicators and to achieve equal opportunity in all State body programming. In 1994, the INIM with 62 women's groups held discussions to mobilize their initiatives and form a bill of action. The discussions formed a plan, which defined patriarchy, sexism, and gender stereotypes to reduce inequality in education, employment, and violence.

Although the Nicaraguan Institute for Women claimed to "have been instrumental in mainstreaming gender equality principles and strategies into agriculture, socio-economic development, higher education, and sexual and domestic violence prevention," the United Nations General Assembly on the Elimination of Discrimination against Women in 2007 raised several concerns, such as the backlog of important women's rights legislation in the country, the lack of studies on abortion, and the available funds of the Institute.

=== Taiwan ===
Under the influence of the UN community, the usage of the term increased in Taiwan since 2000. Local feminist organizations have different views on gender mainstreaming. Some groups considered that the Commission on Women Rights Promotion under Executive Yuan should be expanded, while other groups, including the National Alliance of Taiwan Women's Associations, considered that gender mainstreaming is not promotion of women's rights but an assessment of all policies and requires a specific organization.

Foundation of Women's Rights Promotion and Development (FWRPD) has conducted research on gender mainstreaming and gender equality development, produced gender resources kits for training and education, networked women groups and entrepreneurs, participated in international exchange in UN, APEC gender related meetings.

=== Vienna, Austria ===
In late 2006, the city council of Vienna, capital of Austria, ordered several gender mainstreaming measures for public facilities and areas. Pictograms and information display charts feature a male silhouette holding a baby in his arms to advise passengers on the underground railway to offer seating to parents with children.

Emergency escape paths are marked by a square table featuring a long-haired lady running in her high heel boots.

A pilot kindergarten now uses a flexible open play area instead of separate "playing corners" with toy cars and LEGO for boys or dolls and faux fireplaces for girls. In some pilot kindergartens, traditional fairy tales were rewritten, and a songbook featuring active women was created.

Infrastructure changes have included "unisex" playgrounds for city parks, which encourage young boys and girls to mix and redesigned streetlights to make parks and sidewalks safer for late night joggers.

=== UN Peacekeeping Operations ===
The United Nations began acknowledging the importance of gender mainstreaming as a tool towards achieving gender equality in the mid-1990s, as outlined in the Beijing Platform for Action and the Report from the Secretary General to the Economic and Social Council.

In October 2000, the UN Security Council passed Resolution 1325, a resolution that called for an enhanced female participation in the prevention, management and resolution of conflict. Peacekeeping was an area of particular concern, and the Security Council recognized "the urgent need to mainstream a gender perspective into peacekeeping operations." The Council requested "the Secretary-General, where appropriate, to include in his reporting to the Security Council, progress on gender mainstreaming throughout peacekeeping missions and all other aspects relating to women and girls." As a result, there has been an increase in female peacekeeping personnel. As of 2012, in peacekeeping operations and special political missions, 29 percent of international and 17 percent of national staff were women. If we compare these figures with the 48 percent representation of women at the UN Headquarters, the participation of women in the United Nations Peacekeeping operations still faces challenges.

=== European Union ===
The equality policy of the European Union consists of three pillars: (1) anti-discrimination, (2) affirmative action policies, and (3) gender mainstreaming.

In the 1990s the European Union officially put gender mainstreaming on their agenda, "fixing the principle in treaty articles, action programs and communications, and setting up institutional bodies and mechanisms to promote the incorporation of a gender perspective into policymaking." More specifically, gender mainstreaming was introduced in 1991 in the European Community as an element of the Third Action Programme on Equal Opportunities. Currently, the legal basis for gender mainstreaming in European law is Article 8 of the Treaty on the Functioning of the European Union (TFEU). This article states the following: "In all its activities, the Union shall aim to eliminate inequalities, and to promote equality, between men and women".

What follows is a non-exhaustive overview of current gender governance initiatives in the European Union that encourages gender mainstreaming.

For instance, since 1997 gender mainstreaming has been part of the European Employment Strategy, a concept launched by the European Council. The European Employment Strategy requires governments to adopt an approach that complies with the concept of gender mainstreaming, while deciding on employment policies. Some concrete examples: new equal opportunities acts requiring mainstreaming (e.g., in France social partners are required to promote gender equality through collective bargaining); mainstreaming or gender assessment in individual ministries or areas of public services (e.g., in Finland and Sweden); and gender assessment of all new pieces of legislation. According to Jill Rubery, a Professor of comparative employment system at Manchester School of Management, so far "the experience has been mixed: though the argument that increasing women's employment is critical to the achievement of Europe's aspirations for a higher employment rate has been widely accepted, there is a much weaker and more fragile commitment to improving the quality of work available to women."

A second example is the Transnational Women's Networks. As such we can cite the European Women's Lobby (EWL) as an important women's organization at EU level that was created in 1990. About 2,500 NGOs of 30 European countries are part of the EWL. The European Women's Lobby encourages "coordination of women's civic groups on the EU stages." The EWL lobbied for increasing the involvement of women's organizations in the process of gender governance. In addition the EWL has been pushing for "an EU Strategy to promote, implement and facilitate civil society and specifically women's organizations input into the European debate as an essential part of the European social model." Another important organization is Women in Development Europe (WIDE). This network, created in 1985, consists of NGOs, women's organizations, gender experts, and activists active in development. Women in Development Europe monitors European economic and developmental policies and practices and is involved at many phases in policy-making activities as knowledge source.

Another gender governance actor is the European Institute for Gender Equality (EIGE), established in May 2007. The EIGE has as mandate to "provide expertise, improve knowledge and raise visibility of equality between men and women".

Obviously there are many more initiatives on EU level, to name a few: Advisory Committee on Equal Opportunities for Women and Men, High Level Group on Gender Mainstreaming, Inter-Service Group on Gender Equality, Informal Group of Experts on Gender Equality in Development Cooperation, Women in Europe for our Common Future.

== Criticism ==
=== Ineffective results ===
Maria Stratigaki, Assistant Professor at the Department of Social Policy of Panteion University, claims that the transformative effect of gender mainstreaming was minimal and its application has led to contradictory results. It opened important opportunities for specific policies in new policy areas, whereas in some other it diluted positive action. She also claims that, at least as of 2003, gender mainstreaming has failed to affect core policy areas or radically transform policy processes within the European Institutions.

Some say that gender mainstreaming has not increased women's participation in decision making. As Charlesworth notes, "[i]n the most readily measurable area, the United Nations' employment of women in professional and managerial posts, progress has been glacial. In 2004, women held 37.4 percent of these positions. The annual growth rate toward the 50 percent target [...] is predicted to be 0.4 percent. On top of this slow growth, there is a considerable hierarchy based on sex. On June 30, 2004, women held 83.3 percent of positions at the lowest professional level, P-1, but just 16.7 percent at the highest staff level, Under-Secretary-General." In a similar vein, concerning the European Union, Lombardo reports that as of 2003 women represented only 20 percent of the representatives of the head of state or government the member states, 10 percent of the representatives of national parliaments, 31.25 percent of the representatives of the European Parliament and so forth.

True claims that mainstreaming gender does not end in simply increasing the number of women within a specific institution. It is about changing social consciousness, so that the effects of a policy for both women and men are truly analyzed before they are implemented. While it is necessary for feminists to engage with mainstream institutions, the ability of gender mainstreaming to deconstruct the embedded masculinization of institutions varies depending on the characteristics of the policy, the political nature of the institution, and the depth of the institution's consultation with civil society and other members of the women's rights movement. The danger of gender mainstreaming is that large compromises can be made for small gains and can lead to what feminist and sociology professor Gail Dines calls "trickle-down feminism"—i.e., "working to increase the ranks of women in elite jobs without a strategy for wider economic and social change represents a kind of "trickle-down feminism."

=== Poor implementation ===
Charlesworth remarks that "[a]lthough it has not been difficult to encourage the adoption of the vocabulary of mainstreaming, there is little evidence of monitoring or follow-up. A consistent problem for all the organizations that adopted gender mainstreaming is the translation of the commitment into action." She continues: "A review of gender mainstreaming policies implemented under the United Nations Development Programme, World Bank, and ILO found inadequate budgeting for the gender components of projects, insufficient development of analytical skills, poor supervision of the implementation of gender components and a general lack of political commitment both within the organization and at the country level."

=== Hindering progress ===
Stratigaki claims that positive action was sidelined after the launch of gender mainstreaming as a result of the specific way gender mainstreaming was used by the opponents of gender equality. According to Stratigaki, "[a]lmost all analyses of [gender mainstreaming] agree that it is a strategy which complements but does not replace previous gender specific equality policies like equal treatment legislation and positive action." However, she states too that "in a hostile gender equality policy environments (i.e. patriarchal structures of institutional organisations or the prevalence of policy objectives contrary to gender equality etc.), [gender mainstreaming] may be conceived and applied as an alternative to positive action and used to downplay the final overall objective of gender equality.

True is of the opinion that in practice, attempts to mainstream gender within international institutions have led to the marginalization and increasing invisibility of gender in each policy area. Anne-Marie Goetz, a Clinical Professor at NYU, and Joanne Sandler, a consultant for gender equality and organizational development, argue that ironically, mainstreaming gender runs the risk of becoming everyone's responsibility, yet nobody's at the same time. Gender mainstreaming can allow those in power who are not genuinely interested in the women's movement to adopt the language of women's rights, a reflection of power politics that becomes more of a tool used to legitimize the actions of governments. Gender mainstreaming then becomes more about advising governments than advancing gender equality.

=== Other criticism ===
As differences are silenced, the kind of feminism that is likely to be mainstreamed could be a Western or middle-class brand of feminism. When mainstreaming decisions within international organizations are made by elites can undermine the input of local women's groups.

When gender mainstreaming policies are drafted without consulting sections of the women's movement (i.e., women's rights civil society groups), they lack ground level-expertise. Policy decisions related to gender that are made without consulting sections of the women's movement do not demonstrate a clear political willingness to addressing gender inequality. When institutions reach out to the women's rights movement, it demonstrates transparency, inclusiveness, accountability and the implementation process is more likely to be monitored with diligence. For example, the Millennium Development Goals (MDGs), as an attempt at mainstreaming gender into development, were formed with minimal consultation with women's groups. The MDGs have led to a considerable amount of theoretically discourse about the goals but less analysis about how they will be implemented.

True highlights the tendency for gender mainstreaming to become a guise under which women are used as economic subjects. Women are framed in terms of advancing economic growth, as opposed to the inherent normative ideal for women and men to hold equal positions of power in society.

== See also ==
- Feminist economics
- Gender and security sector reform
- Gender Empowerment Measure
- Gender mainstreaming in teacher education policy
- Gender mainstreaming in mine action
- History of feminism
- Material feminism
- Sex differences in psychology
- Special measures for gender equality in the United Nations
- Youth mainstreaming
