= Feminism in Taiwan =

Taiwan has a complex history with feminist and women's rights movements, marked by periods of progress where feminism and strong female icons flourished, as well as periods of strict authoritarianism that devalued equality and individual rights. Thanks in part to the efforts of generations of feminists, Taiwan is now one of the most gender-equal countries in Asia, consistently outranking its East Asian neighbors in international gender equality indices (ranked 6th globally by the Gender Inequality Index in 2019 and 29th globally according to the government's own calculations based on the Gender Gap Index in 2020).

== Japanese rule ==
At the beginning of Japanese Colonial Rule, the government was in some ways more progressive than Taiwanese society. The Bureau of Social Education in the Japanese colonial government proposed policies to curb abuse and trafficking of adopted daughters, specifically to strengthen protection of such children and launch campaigns to raise awareness of such issues. In the same period, elimination of foot-binding was announced by the Japanese government in 1914. During the 1920s, the colonial government was relatively tolerant of political dissent, allowing the first autonomous women's movement in Taiwanese history to flourish.

=== Autonomous Women's Movement in the 1920s ===
Throughout the 1920s, progressive Taiwanese intellectuals and students published numerous articles to raise awareness on women's issues in the Taiwanese society. In 1921, fearing Japanese assimilation, the Taiwanese Cultural Association, a Taiwan petition movement demanding the formation of a local parliament, was founded. Many intellectuals traveled through Taiwan to raise public awareness about women's rights and labor-related issues. Additionally, they opposed the trafficking of women and advocated for gender equality and universal suffrage. According to Doris Chang, the goal of the movements was to achieve the emancipation of Taiwanese women from colonial domination, patriarchal oppression, and capital exploitation.

As the New Culture movement occurred in China from 1915 to 1923, raising awareness of modern culture to replace the concepts of certain Confucian conducts, Taiwanese intellectuals were influenced by progressive ideas and eventually launched Taiwan's own New Culture Movement in the 1920s. During the movement, articles challenged the inferiority of women in the traditional Confucian system, stating that Heaven provided equality among both men and women, and advocated human rights. Intellectuals reinterpreted the concept of heaven and legitimized men and women's common humanity and gender equity. Such new culture advocates also advocated women's independence in marriage and family. A female intellectual, Su Yi-chen, urged women to resist any marriage coercion where parents force their daughters into unwanted marriages. She believed that marriages should be done freely between two individuals based on mutual respect and opinions.

Thus, from the 1920s to 1931, enhancement of gender equality and women's status was promoted on Taiwan's social and political grounds, including revisions to certain concepts in Confucianism.

Due to the industrialization in Taiwan in the mid-1920s, labor disputes increased between Japanese capitalists and Taiwanese laborers. Mostly female strikers protested against undesirable working conditions, unequal wages between men and women and more. Left-wing organizations such as the Taiwan Farmers' Union and the Taiwan Communist Party promoted women's rights, meanwhile regularly giving speeches awakening women farm laborers to unite with male laborers to go against Japanese capitalists. Such movements were helped by the Taiwan Cultural Association which in fact led to a military strategy for achieving independence from the Japanese empire in 1928.

While some autonomous women's associations have succeeded in their movements, many feminist activists were aware of capitalists' exploitation of women laborers. Compared with the revolutionary goals of the Taiwan Farmers' Union and the Taiwan Communist Party, the goals of certain autonomous women's associations were relatively moderate and reformist. Apart from promoting women workers' rights and feminist movements in Taiwan, they enhanced in exchange of ideas and knowledge, also providing emotional supports among members between several association groups.

Ultimately, autonomous women's organizations in colonial Taiwan were relatively short-lived due to intervention of the Japanese colonial government, which in the 1930s started suppressing left-wing women's movements and social and political organizations that supported them such as the Taiwan Cultural Association and Taiwan Communist Party.

=== Government-affiliated Women's Organizations ===
While autonomous women's movements were suppressed, the government-affiliated women's organizations in Japan as well as in its colonies flourished during Japan's military expansion. Government-affiliated women's associations such as the Patriotic Women's Association, which was created as early as 1901, were in charge of consoling wounded military soldiers. Apart from supporting the troops and their families, members of the Association have also functioned as an institution for the colonial government to reinforce Taiwanese women's identification with the Japanese nation. This identification includes fulfilling their "patriotic duties" by contributing their labor in industries and factories. In 1942, the Great Japan Women's Association was created in northern Taiwan in order to eliminate unnecessary government-affiliated organizations and merge them as a whole new Great Japan Women's Association. While adult women joined the Great Japan Women's Association, Taiwanese high school girls were encouraged to join the Girl's Youth Corps where some volunteered as nurses during the Pacific War.

== ROC era ==
=== The 1950s and 1960s ===
After the Japanese defeat in World War 2 in 1945, when the Kuomintang gained control of Taiwan, rates of female workforce participation and functional literacy were higher in Taiwan than in mainland China. The political climate however, became increasingly repressive after the brutal crackdown on Taiwanese protestors in 1947. Having fled to Taiwan in 1948/1949, the government enacted martial law, under which civil liberties guaranteed in the constitution such as freedom of speech and freedom of assembly where severely restricted and political dissidents punished harshly. The following decades of hard authoritarian rule known as the "White Terror" were not conductive to the development of an autonomous women's movement. While Government associated woman's organizations worked to ensure female education on one hand, they reinforced traditional Confucian gender roles on the other. These gender roles were further emphasized through public education and mass media.

As the Taiwanese economy grew and industrialized in the 60s and 70s, the number of women in the workforce kept increasing, reaching 41,5% in 1973 (from 32.6 in 1966). Especially unmarried women were encouraged by the government to participate in the workforce. However, after they married and bore children many women left the workplace to take care of the children and their in-laws. This was due to traditional societal expectations, a lack of social support systems and a lack of opportunity to pursue careers in a male-dominated workplace. Even though laws passed by the KMT back in the 1930s, when it ruled China, formally guaranteed equal pay for equal work and paid maternity leave, these laws were not always followed in practice.

=== 1970s ===
Although martial law was still active, the 1970s saw a weakening of authoritarian control in Taiwan, which gave rise to political opposition and various social movements.

Annette Lu is considered the founder of feminist thinking in modern Taiwan and established the first formal women's-rights movement in 1972. Like many other prominent activists of the time, she was a highly educated member of the middle class who had studied abroad. After completing her law studies at National Taiwan University as first of her class, she had accepted a scholarship at the University of Illinois in Urbana-Champaign, where she encountered American feminism. After attaining her degree in 1971, she returned to Taiwan for a high-ranking government job.

Lu's activism was first triggered by two ongoing debates in Taiwanese society: the first concerned a Taiwanese man who had murdered his wife in the US and fled to Taiwan, whom many defended publicly on the grounds that his wife might have cheated. The second was the rising number of female college applicants, which increased competition for college spots and led some to demand formal privileges for men. Lu's articles vehemently criticized the dehumanization of the murdered wife and argued for fair competition between men and women for college spots.

In the following years, "Lu openly criticized male supremacy, parental preference for male offspring, double moral standards and inequality embedded in both family law and nationality law." Double moral standards especially included the demand of female chastity, while male unfaithfulness was widespread and accepted. In 1974, she published her first theoretical book on feminism, named New Feminism. She argued that "gender differences ought to be diminished in their social roles and believed that individuals ought to have the option of remaining unmarried", but she never went as far as criticizing the institution of marriage or the role of women in the family, emphasizing that taking care of the family was women's "divine role", nor did she openly support homosexuality. This very moderate feminism is the reason why she was able to disseminate her ideas in a conservative society under a repressive government.

In institutionalizing her ideas through various organizations, however, Lu faced conservative backlash and government censorship. In 1976, she founded the Pioneer Press in Taibei, which published fifteen books by prominent feminist thinkers in just one year, before having to close due to backlash in 1977. After delivering a twenty-minute keynote address during the Kaohsiung Incident in 1979, Lu was arrested, court-martialled and sentenced to twelve years in prison. She served five-and-a-half years and was released in 1985. She would later serve as the Vice President of the Republic of China between 2000 and 2008.

Despite the repressive political and social climate, Lu had successfully managed to disseminate her very moderate feminist ideas to educated middle class women, ensuring the continuation of the feminist movement into the 1980s.

=== 1980s ===
Annette Lu was a leading figure of the feminist movement in Taiwan in the 1970s. Lee Yuan-chen, one of her associates, became a leading figure in the 1980s. Born in Kunming in mainland China, Lee's family moved to Taipei in 1949. She was an educated woman, having studied at the National Taiwan University's Chinese Literature department, obtaining a bachelor's degree in 1968 and a master's degree in 1970. After graduating she started working in a teaching position at Tamkang University. She married a classmate and while their marriage was egalitarian at first, this changed after the birth of their child. Pushed into a traditional female role, she divorced her husband, went to the United States and enrolled at the University of Oregon. She became familiar with several feminist ideologies, which continued to influence her after her return to Taiwan in 1976.

After Lu's imprisonment, Lee and several other associates founded the Awakening Publishing House in 1982. Its goals were to enable women to take sole control of their financial and emotional independence. It remained the only non-government affiliated group to challenge existing hierarchy and stand in for gender equality until the lifting of martial law in 1987. The monthly magazine Awakening dominated feminist discourse in the 1980s and Awakening Publishing House became an important gathering point for feminist activities, similar to Lu's Pioneer Press in the previous decade. Awakening Publishing House's role in the Taiwanese feminist movement would remain of great importance until the early 1990s.

The feminists belonging to Awakening Publishing House stood for a gender-egalitarian society. In this society, occupation should be determined by talents and interests rather than gender. Additionally, both men and women should be able to express themselves freely without the need to adhere to gender specific roles. To achieve this, they found communication and a mutual understanding between men and women to be a key factor. Awakening engaged in organizing or participating in workshops and panel discussions. By ensuring these events were covered by the media, they hoped to transfer these discussions from a public space into homes in Taiwan. They continued to face difficulties as women started to engage in male-dominated major affairs i.e. issues regarding politics or finance set in a public space. However, men were very reluctant to take over female-dominated minor affairs such as housework. Besides communication between men and women, Lee urged women to also discuss amongst themselves and support each other. This mutual support was especially important in dividing the responsibility for child upbringing, freeing up time to go to work, do voluntary service and participate in a public social life. Furthermore childcare should no longer be solely a responsibility of women. Instead both parents should divide time between them and childcare centers should enable women to return to work.

Following the end of martial law in 1987 and the democratization of Taiwanese society, feminist thought flourished in the 1990s and many legal aims of feminist organizations were achieved. This includes children being able to inherit women's last names, women being allowed to live without their husbands, and equal rights for women in divorce proceedings.

=== Late 1990s to present ===
In late 1990s, the feminist groups in Taiwan became more diverse and were reaching into more social issues like the division of household labour and the decriminalization of adultery. At the same time, inner differences started to appear, with certain groups deliberately distancing themselves from the feminist movement, and feminist opinions diverging on certain issues. The following section will cover in detail the development of feminist discourse and legislation within certain topics.

=== Sex Industry ===
In 1987, the Huaxi Street Parade in Taipei City, which cared for young prostitutes, and the ensuing controversy over the abolition of public prostitution brought to the fore the contradiction between the positions of "sexual liberation" and "sexual criticism" in the women's movement circle.

On 4 September 1997, the Taipei City Government announced the abolition of the "Management Measures for Prostitution" and the suspension of issuing licenses for prostitution. From the 6th, a full ban on prostitution was implemented. On the eve before the abolition of the "Prostitution Management Measures" was announced by the city government, on 1 September, more than a hundred public prostitutes in Taipei City made a petition to the city government and the city council, hoping that the city government can suspend the abolition of prostitution, using the "two-year buffer" as the main appeal. Various feminist organizations, among them the Awakening foundation, came forward to support the demands of the prostitutes.

Supporting the abolition of prostitution, there were women's groups in Taipei that specialize in rescuing young prostitutes, such as the Taipei Women's Rescue Foundation and the Lixin Foundation. Both believed that the prostitution industry does not respect women's personality and exploits women, and should be abolished. Among them, Lin Fangmei believed that women are victims of the sex industry, and advocates that the sex industry and clients should be regulated, prostitution should be decriminalized, and that prostitution should not be punished. Shen Meizhen, who was engaged in the rescue of young prostitutes, believed that "the prostitution system violates human dignity and value", and the government should guide public prostitutes to change jobs.

Josephine Ho took the viewpoint of sexual liberation. She believed that sex work can also be a kind of selective liberation of the subject, demanding more appropriate working conditions for prostitutes. Wang Fangping of the Women Workers Unite Production Line believed that the middle-class women's movement ignores the livelihood of prostitutes, "Illegalizing prostitution does not mean banning prostitution, it just makes the sex trade move completely underground, and at the same time gives up all opportunities to protect the labor rights of prostitutes."

In the end, public prostitutes took advantage of the Mayor election of Taipei City in 1998 to support Ma Ying-jeou in the mayoral election campaign. After Ma Ying-jeou was elected mayor, he brought the case forward again, and finally won a two-year grace period for the abolition of prostitution.

To this day, gender groups and women's activists still have different positions on sex workers, but most of them sympathize with sex workers and agree that prostitutes should not be punished. The attitude of society as a whole towards the sex industry is gradually opening up, and there are guided tours of the history and culture of the sex industry from time to time. In 2020, under the impact of the epidemic, the livelihood of many sex workers will be greatly affected, and at the same time, they will bear the stigma of causing the expansion of the epidemic. However, there is an association legal person Taiwan Sex Industry Workers' Rights Promotion Association, which is concerned about the situation of sex industry workers.

=== Right to work ===
After the 1970s, Taiwan's economy grew, and the female labor force participation rate gradually increased, but the distribution of economic achievements was uneven. By 1989, the female labor remuneration rate was only 50%-70% of that of males. When women entered the workplace, they encountered gender discrimination in the process of recruitment, promotion, and retirement, and housework is also taken for granted.

In 1987, 57 female waiters at the National Sun Yat-Sen Memorial Hall in Taipei entrusted lawyers to ask for the abolition of the requirement that they must leave their jobs at the age of 30 or if they were pregnant. The institution replied: "We are the highest cultural institution in the country. When receiving foreign guests, we must introduce noble cultural relics. The reception staff must be dignified, but women over 30 years old are old and pearly." Such a reply made female employees and women's groups quite dissatisfied, so they took to the streets and filed a complaint with the Sun Yat-Sen Memorial Hall. But except for the 7th article of the constitution, which stipulates that "The people of the Republic of China, regardless of gender, are equal in law", they found no other relevant provisions based on which they could sue the Memorial Hall. Therefore, women's movement groups such as Awakening Foundation began to draft the "Gender Equality in Work Law". Finally, in 2001, the "Gender Equality in Work Law" was enacted to guarantee the equality of the right to work for both sexes. In 2007, it was amended as the Gender Equality Work Law to guarantee the equality of gender equality in work rights.

== Prominent Taiwanese Feminists ==
- Li Ang (writer) Feminist writer
- Chen Hsiu-hui Feminist activist and politician
- Fangge Dupan Feminist Poet
- Josephine Ho Feminist scholar and activist
- Huang Sue-ying Feminist activist and politician
- Yenlin Ku Feminist involved in the women's movement in Taiwan
- Annette Lu Feminist politician active in the Tangwai movement
- Miss Ko Feminist singer-songwriter and rapper
- Tina Pan Feminist politician and member of the Legislative Yuan from 1993 to 2002 and again from 2005 and 2016
- Peng Wan-ru Feminist politician. Former director of the Democratic Progressive Party's Women's Affairs Department
- Jolin Tsai Feminist singer, songwriter, dancer, actress, and businesswoman
- Wu Yi-chen Feminist lawyer and politician
- Xie Xuehong Feminist activist and politician
- Yang Fang-wan Feminist lawyer and politician

== See also ==
- Women in Taiwan
- National Alliance of Taiwan Women's Associations
