= Women in Taiwan =

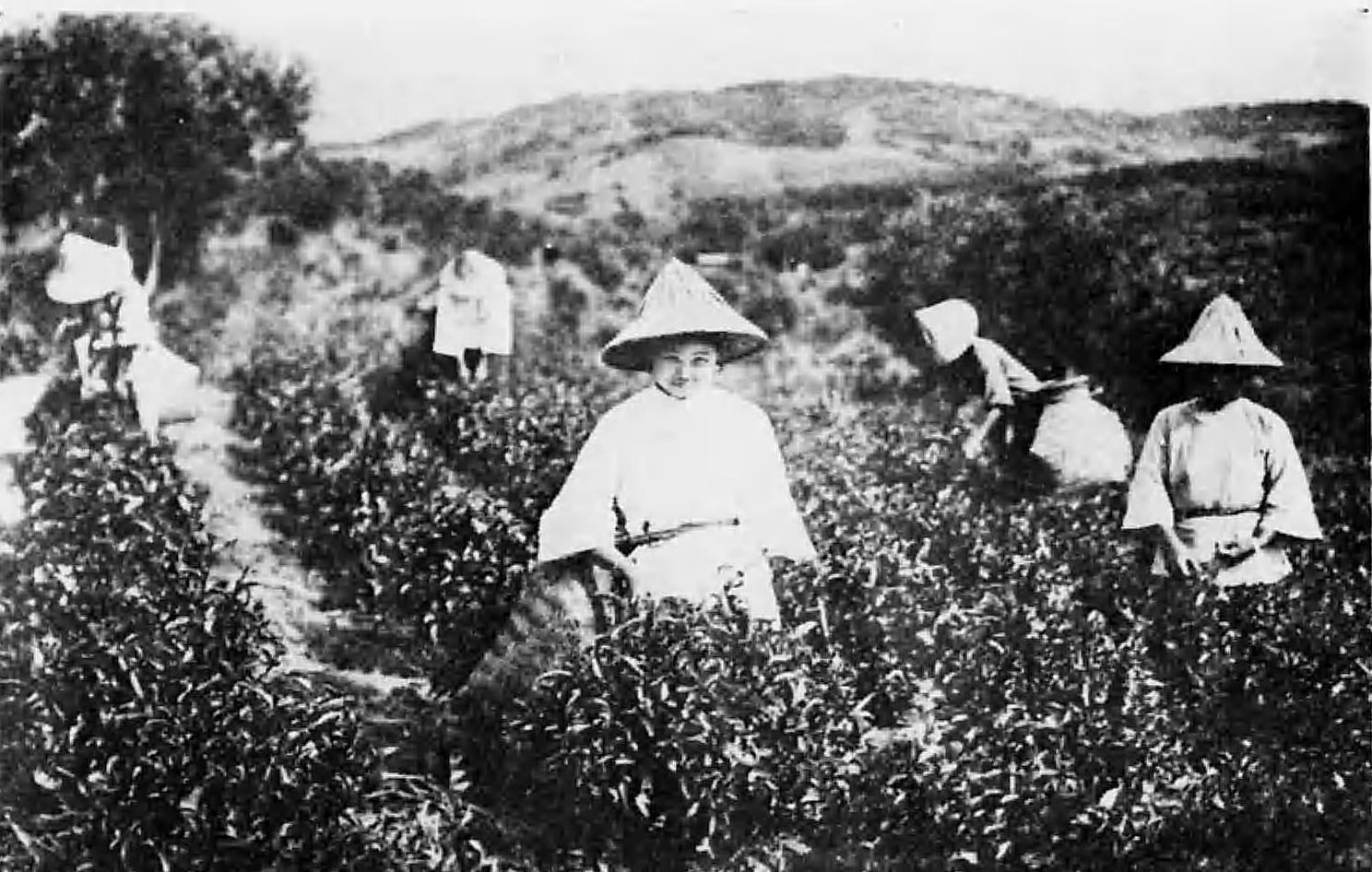
Women in Taiwan in 1933

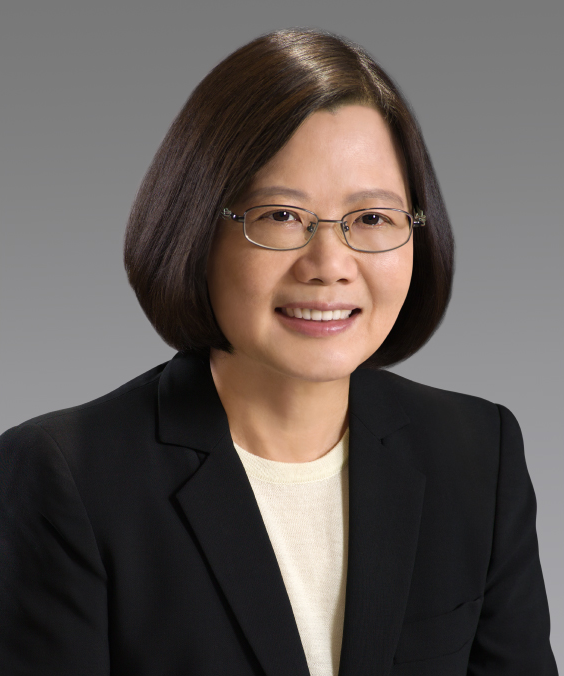
Tsai Ing-wen, elected as president of Taiwan in 2016 and 2020

The status of women in Taiwan has been based on and affected by the traditional patriarchal views and social structure within Taiwanese society, which put women in a subordinate position to men, although the legal status of Taiwanese women has improved in recent years, particularly during the past three decades when family law underwent several amendments. Throughout history, women in Taiwan had suffered various forms of discrimination, including foot binding.

== Marriage and family law ==
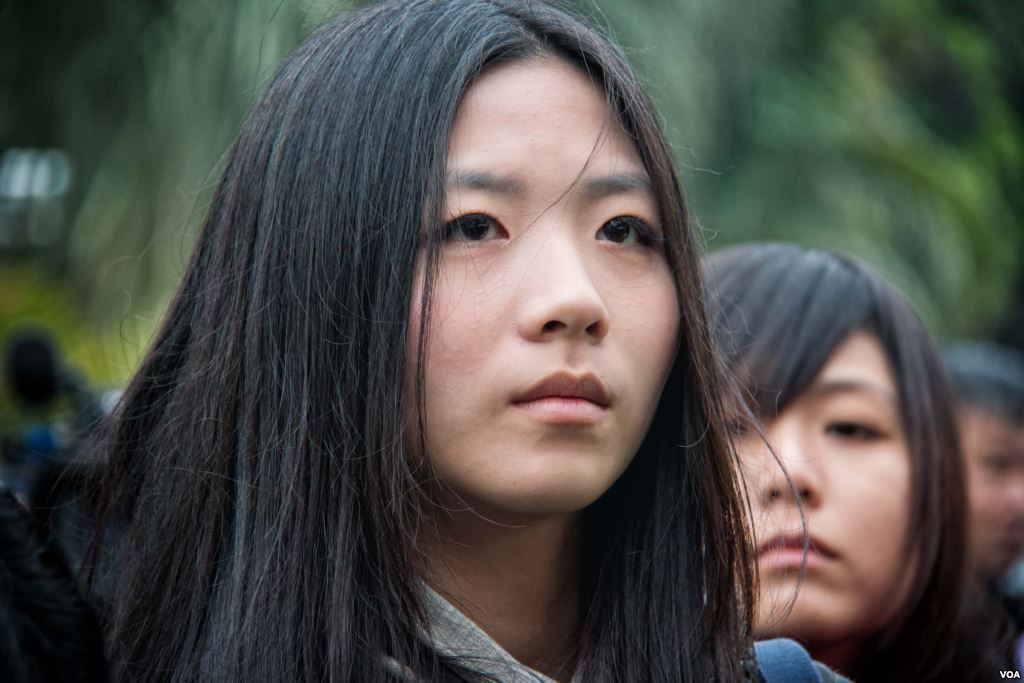
Young women in Taiwan

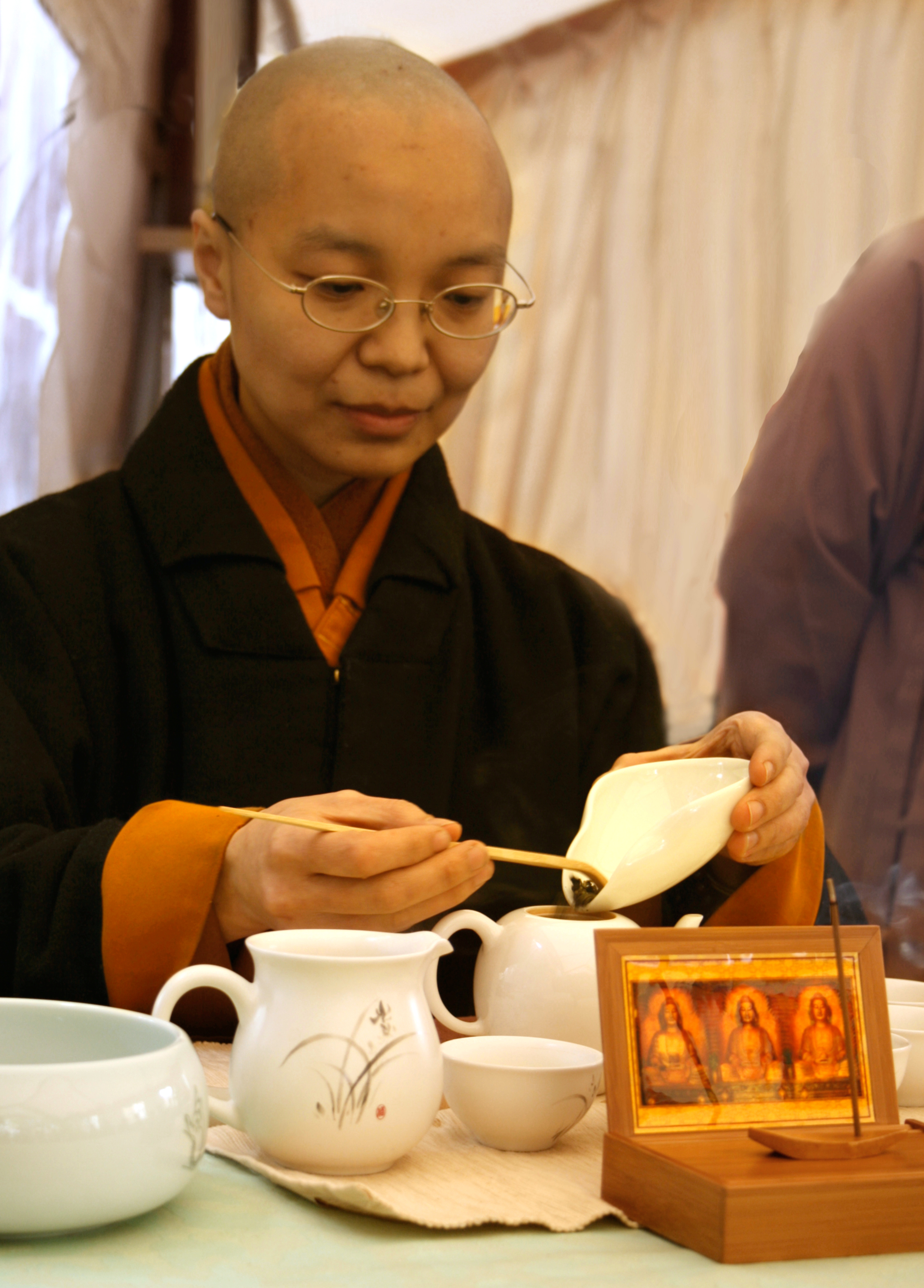
Taiwanese bhiksuni (Buddhist nun) at a Vesak celebration, serving Oolong tea

Throughout the 20th century, married women's rights were severely restricted, but they gradually improved, especially due to legal changes made from the late 20th century onward (family law was revised five times between 1996 and 2002).

In 1895, Taiwan came under Japanese rule and Japanese marriage laws (which discriminated against women) were applied. After Japan's defeat in 1945, the section of family law from the Civil Law promulgated on the Republican mainland in 1930, came into force in Taiwan, too (family law was later changed in the mainland by the communist regime, but this did not apply to Taiwan).

The 1930 Taiwanese Civil Code provided limited rights to Taiwanese women, such as having no right in deciding their residence, the lack of right to own property, the lack of right to file a divorce, the lack of self-protection, and the lack of right to child custody, and discrimination against illegitimate children.

The situation of married women improved slightly due to changes made in 1985 and 1996. By 1998, the new regulations had made divorce a little easier, allowed the wife to keep her own property registered in her name before 1985 without proving that she previously owned it; and allowed the judge to consider the best interest of children when evaluating the custody of children in a divorce case. Yet these changes did not go all the way as to give wives equal rights with husbands, as the continuation of the influence of patriarchal ideology with regards to family matters was maintained: the male still had superiority in decisions related to the wife's residence, disciplinary measures for their offsprings, and managing property.

In 1998, the Domestic Violence Prevention Law came into force, dealing with domestic violence. New changes to the family law between 1998 and 2000, provided that the husband and wife's domicile is that which is agreed upon by them, rather than necessarily that of the husband's; and amended the law on legal guardians of a minor.

Marriage regulations are currently based on gender equality, being found in Chapter II- Marriage of the Civil Code (Articles 972 - 1058). Mothers and fathers now have equal rights towards their children: the original Article 1089 stated that parental rights should be exercised by the father if the father and the mother did not share the same views, but this provision was declared unconstitutional (in contradiction of Article 7 of the Constitution), and, as such, Article 1089 was amended to read: "[...] If there is inconsistency between the parents in the exercise of the rights in regard to the grave events of the minor child, they may apply to the court for the decision in accordance with the best interests of the child". Also, the Article 1019 (which stipulated that only the husband had the right to manage the shared property of a married couple, and had the right to use and receive profits from property that originally belonged to his wife, and not vice versa) was repealed.

== Constitutional protections ==
Women's rights are protected in the Constitution of Taiwan: Article 7 states: "All citizens of the Republic of China, irrespective of sex, religion, race, class, or party affiliation, shall be equal before the law". The Additional Article 10, section 6 reads: The State shall protect the dignity of women, safeguard their personal safety, eliminate sexual discrimination, and further substantive gender equality.

The constitution also protected female candidates in elections. In Article 134 states: "In the various kinds of election, quotas of successful candidates shall be assigned to women; methods of implementation shall be prescribed by law".

The constitutional amendments further state that legislators elected through the party list must have at least half being women. In local elections the law requires that in each district, at least a quarter of the elected representatives must be women.

== Labour rights ==
Th Act of Gender Equality in Employment ensures women's rights in the workforce. It was enacted in 2002 under the name of "Gender Equality in Employment Law of Taiwan", and later was amended and renamed the "Act of Gender Equality in Employment".

== Sex-selective abortion ==
As in other parts of East Asia, sex-selective abortion is reported to happen in Taiwan. The Department of Health has taken measures to curb this practice.

== MeToo movement ==
In 2023 the Taiwanese hit drama Wave Makers brought increased attention to sexual harassment in Taiwanese society and set of a round of grappling with the issue.

== See also ==
- Feminism in Taiwan
- Abortion in Taiwan
- Taiwanese people
- Yenlin Ku
- National Alliance of Taiwan Women's Associations
- Women in Asia
