= Chen Hsiu-hui =

Chen Hsiu-hui MLY
- 陳秀惠

Member of the Legislative Yuan
- In office 1 February 2005 – 31 January 2008
- Constituency: Republic of China

Personal details
- Born: 7 May 1962 (age 64) Taitung County, Taiwan
- Party: Democratic Progressive Party
- Education: Chung Chi College
- Occupation: politician

Chen Hsiu-hui (Chinese: 陳秀惠; pinyin: Chén Xiùhuì; born 7 May 1962) is a Taiwanese Amis politician.

== Activism ==
Chen attended Chung Chi College in Hong Kong and is a minister of the Presbyterian Church of Taiwan. She has also been active in the Foundation of Women's Rights Promotion and Development and the National Cultural Association.

Chen is the founding chair of the Homemakers' Union, and has led the National Alliance of Taiwan Women's Associations.

== Political career ==
Chen was listed on the Democratic Progressive Party list and elected to the Legislative Yuan via proportional representation in 2004. She criticized a 2004 bill regarding land restoration and conservation, stating, "Land restoration and conservation should be a national issue, not the sole responsibility of aboriginal peoples. If the government really wants the draft to benefit indigenous peoples, it can approve various budgets, such as for a forest protection fund, to assist them with practical sustainable development plans." As written, the bill was vague, not practical, and amounted to political propaganda, she believed. Chen also derided government attempts to promote aboriginal languages. Chen supported the caning of people who have committed sex crimes.

She was named the leader of Taipei's Indigenous Peoples Commission by mayor Ko Wen-je in December 2014, and began receiving pressure to resign in 2016, after she made remarks that stigmatized Atayals.
