= United Nations Staff Selection System =

The United Nations Staff Selection System is a system of rules for recruitment, placement, promotion, and mobility of staff up to the D-2 level, incorporating mobility requirements and specific provisions for gender equality.

The United Nations Secretariat, in April 2010, pursuant to Secretary-General's bulletin ST/SGB/2002/5, promulgated United Nations Staff Selection System administrative instruction (ST/AI 2010/3) dated 22 April 2010. Administrative instruction ST/AI 2010/3 supersedes and abolishes the administrative instructions titled "Staff selection system" (ST/AI/ 2006/3/Rev.1), "Technical cooperation personnel and OPAS officers" (ST/AI/297 and Add.1), and "Movement of staff from the Field Service category to the Professional category" (ST/AI/360/Rev.1 and Corr.1). The new administrative instruction will remain in effect "until specifically amended or abolished". ST/AI 2010/3 applies to all appointments up to the D-2 level that have contracts of 1 year or longer. It excludes appointments at the Assistant Secretary-General and Under-Secretary-General levels, temporary appointments, and appointment of staff selected through a competitive examination.

The intent of the new system is to integrate "recruitment, placement, promotion and mobility of staff within the Secretariat" up to and including D-1 and equivalent posts. The new system introduces a new requirement of periodic 'mobility' for promotion for "Staff in the Professional and above categories, up to and including those at the D-2 level".

== ST/SGB and ST/AI ==
In the hierarchy of UN laws, ST/Secretary-General bulletins (ST/SGB) are higher than ST/AI. ST/SGB are bulletins that promulgate "Regulations adopted by the General Assembly, establish Financial Rules, Staff Rules and the organizational structure of the Secretariat and contain important decisions of policy. They are issued by the Secretary-General and remain in effect from a given date until specifically amended or abolished". The ST/AI series are administrative instructions that implement ST/SGB. These "prescribe instructions and procedures ... and set forth office practices and procedures to be applied in more than one department of the Secretariat. These instructions remain in effect from a given date until specifically amended or abolished".

== Staff Selection System and gender equality in the UN ==
Affirmative measures to achieve gender equality in the UN system are contained in administrative instruction ST/AI/1999/9, "Special Measures for the Achievement of Gender Equality". This remains in force, and is listed under the heading Appointments, placement and promotion in the Annual Index to Administrative Issuance along with the administrative instruction on the Staff Selection System (ST/AI/2010/3). Since 2010, the UN Secretariat has contended that section 13.3 of the new Staff Selection System (ST/AI 2010/3) supersedes the administrative instruction on gender equality (ST/AI 1999/9), especially its section 1.8 on affirmative action as it is inconsistent with 2010/3. Similar provisions for gender equality existed in earlier Staff Selection System administrative instructions (ST/AI/2006/3). However, it has been reported that administrative instruction addressing gender equality in the UN has become a more prominent issue since 2010 and has been implemented reluctantly with diminishing enthusiasm by UN entities. UN Women, in contrast, continues to affirm that ST/AI/1999/9 is in effect and applicable. The Secretary General has also reiterated to the general assembly that ST/AI/1999/9 remains in effect.

== Manuals on staff selection ==
The administrative instructions on the Staff Selection System have been supplemented with several manuals that are designed to serve as guidance on the responsibilities of (a) the head of the department, (b) the hiring manager, (c) the staff member/applicant, (d) the central review body members, (e) the recruiter (namely, the Office of Human Resources Management [OHRM]), as well as others. The main manuals, which are periodically updated by OHRM, are: (a) The Applicant's Manual: Manual for the Applicant on the Staff Selection System (Inspira); and (b) Manual for the Recruiter on the Staff Selection System.

== Jurisprudence ==
The Staff Selection System (ST/AI 2010/3) has been a frequent cause of litigation, especially with regard to affirmative action policies promulgated in ST/AI 1999/9. UN tribunals have ruled in favor of the UN gender equality policies in ST/AI 1999/9. Recent tribunal judgements are:

=== Appleton (2012) ===
In August 2012, the tribunal acknowledged that "The general provisions to give women preferential treatment for appointments are found in ST/AI/1999/9" and that during "selection, vacancies shall be filled by a woman if her qualifications (a) meet the requirements for the vacant post and (b) are substantially equal or superior to those of competing male candidates (sec. 1.8)" As a result, the tribunal confirmed the mandatory character of the "rules in ST/AI/1999/9 concerning preferential treatment of women in selection processes".

=== Farrimond (2014) ===
In August 2014, the UN administration accepted in the United Nations Dispute Tribunal that administrative instruction ST/AI/1999/9 was valid in a selection process. In examining whether the relevant sections of ST/AI 1999/9 had "been correctly applied to the case at hand", the tribunal concluded that the administration failed to respect the provisions of ST/AI 1999/9 and rescinded the initial selection decision for this and other infractions.

== See also ==
- United Nations Secretariat
- Special measures for gender equality in the United Nations
