= Kalanke v Freie Hansestadt Bremen =

- Court: European Court of Justice
- Decided: 17 October 1995
- Citation: (1995) C-450/93, [1995] IRLR 660, [1996] ICR 314, [1996] ECR I-03051

Keywords
- Positive action

Kalanke v Freie Hansestadt Bremen (1995) C-450/93 is a German and EU labour law case, concerning positive action. It was qualified in Marschall v Land Nordrhein Westfalen (1997) C-409/95.

== Facts ==
Mr Kalanke and a woman were shortlisted for promotion to a management position in the city's parks department. Both were equally qualified. The council's rules gave automatic priority, if two candidates were equally qualified, to women in sectors where they were under-represented. That meant less than half in any pay bracket. Mr Kalanke claimed it was discrimination under Directive 76/207/EC art 2(1) and art 2(4).

AG Tesauro concluded it would be unlawful. At paragraph 28 he said, 'Formal, numerical equality is an objective which may salve some consciences, but it will remain illusory and devoid of all substance unless it goes together with measures which are genuinely destined to achieve equality, which was not the case in this instance and, in any event, it was not claimed that any such measures were significant. In the final analysis, that which is necessary above all is a substantial change in the economic, social and cultural model which is at the root of the inequalities – a change which will certainly not be brought about by numbers and dialectical battles which are now on the defensive.’

== Judgment ==
The European Court of Justice held that 'where women and men who are candidates for the same promotion are equally qualified, women are automatically to be given priority in sectors where they are under-represented, involves discrimination on grounds of sex'. The derogation under the Equal Treatment Directive art 2(4) for 'measures to promote equal opportunity for men and women, in particular by removing existing inequalities which affect women's opportunities' had to be narrowly construed.

17 October 1995. The following judgment was delivered in open court in Luxembourg. 1 By order of 22 June 1993, received at the court on 23 November 1993, the Bundesarbeitsgericht (Federal Labour Court) referred to the court for a preliminary ruling under article 177 of the E.E.C. Treaty two questions on the interpretation of article 2(1) and (4) of Council Directive (76/207/E.E.C.) of 9 February 1976 on the implementation of the principle of equal treatment for men and women as regards access to employment, vocational training and promotion, and working conditions. 2 Those questions were raised in proceedings between the plaintiff, Mr. Kalanke, and Freie Hansestadt Bremen (City of Bremen). 3 Paragraph 4 of the Landesgleichstellungsgesetz of 20 November 1990 (“L.G.G.;” the Bremen Law on Equal Treatment for Men and Women in the Public Service) (Bremisches Gesetzblatt, p. 433) provides: “Appointment, assignment to an official post and promotion “(1) In the case of an appointment (including establishment as a civil servant or judge) which is not made for training purposes, women who have the same qualifications as men applying for the same post are to be given priority in sectors where they are under-represented. (2) In the case of an assignment to a position in a higher pay, remuneration and salary bracket, women who have the same qualifications as men applying for the same post are to be given priority if they are under-represented. This also applies in the case of assignment to a different official post and promotion ... (4) Qualifications are to be evaluated exclusively in accordance with the requirements of the occupation, post to be filled or career bracket. Specific experience and capabilities, such as those acquired as a result of family work, social commitment or unpaid activity, are part of the qualifications within the meaning of sub-paragraphs (1) and (2) if they are of use in performing the duties of the position in question. (5) There is under-representation if women do not make up at least half of the staff in the individual pay, remuneration and salary brackets in the relevant personnel group within a department. This also applies to the function levels provided for in the organisation chart.” 4 It appears from the order for reference that, at the final stage of recruitment to a post of section manager in the Bremen parks department, two candidates, both in B.A.T. pay bracket III (see ante, p. 317G–H), were shortlisted: the plaintiff, the holder of a diploma in horticulture and landscape gardening, who had worked since 1973 as a horticultural employee in the parks department and acted as permanent assistant to the section manager; and Mrs. Glissmann, holder of a diploma in landscape gardening since 1983 and also employed, since 1975, as a horticultural employee in the parks department. 5 The staff committee refused to give its consent to the plaintiff's promotion, proposed by the parks department management. Reference to arbitration resulted in a recommendation in favour of the plaintiff. The staff committee then stated that the arbitration had failed and appealed to *330 the conciliation board which, in a decision binding on the employer, considered that the two candidates were equally qualified and that priority should therefore be given, in accordance with the L.G.G., to the woman. 6 Before the Arbeitsgericht (Labour Court), the plaintiff claimed that he was better qualified than Mrs. Glissmann, a fact which the conciliation board had failed to recognise. He argued that, by reason of its quota system, the L.G.G. was incompatible with the Bremen Constitution, with the Grundgesetz (German Basic Law) and with paragraph 611a of the B.G.B. (German Civil Code). His application was dismissed, however, by the Arbeitsgericht and again, on appeal, by the Landesarbeitsgericht (Regional Labour Court). 7 The first chamber of the Bundesarbeitsgericht, hearing the plaintiff's application for review on a point of law, considers that resolution of the dispute depends essentially on the applicability of the L.G.G. It points out that, if the conciliation board was wrong in applying that Law, its decision would be unlawful because it gave an advantage, solely on the ground of sex, to an equally qualified female candidate. The Bundesarbeitsgericht accepts the Landesarbeitsgericht's finding that the two applicants were equally qualified for the post. Considering itself bound also by that court's finding that women are under-represented in the parks department, it holds that the conciliation board was obliged, under paragraph 4(2) of the L.G.G., to refuse to agree to the plaintiff's appointment to the vacant post. 8 The Bundesarbeitsgericht points out that the case does not involve a system of strict quotas reserving a certain proportion of posts for women, regardless of their qualifications, but rather a system of quotas dependent on candidates' abilities. Women enjoy no priority unless the candidates of both sexes are equally qualified. 9 The national court considers that the quota system is compatible with the German constitutional and statutory provisions referred to in paragraph 6 above. More specifically, it points out that paragraph 4 of the L.G.G. must be interpreted in accordance with the Grundgesetz with the effect that, even if priority for promotion is to be given in principle to women, exceptions must be made in appropriate cases. 10 It notes a number of factors suggesting that such a system is not incompatible with Directive (76/207/E.E.C.). 11 Considering, however, that doubts remain in that regard, the Bundesarbeitsgericht has stayed the proceedings and sought a preliminary ruling from the court on the following questions: “(1) Must article 2(4) of Council Directive (76/207/E.E.C.) be interpreted as also covering statutory provisions under which, when a position in a higher pay bracket is being assigned, women with the same qualifications as men applying for the same position are to be given priority if women are under-represented, there being deemed to be under-representation if women do not make up at least half of the staff in the individual pay brackets in the relevant personnel group within a department, which also applies to the function levels provided for in the organisation chart? “(2) If question (1) is answered in the negative, must article 2(1) of Council Directive (76/207/E.E.C.) be interpreted, having regard to *331 the principle of proportionality, as meaning that it is not permissible to apply statutory provisions under which, when a position in a higher pay bracket is being assigned, women with the same qualifications as men applying for the same position are to be given priority if women are under-represented, there being deemed to be under-representation if women do not make up at least half of the staff in the individual pay brackets in the relevant personnel group within a department, which also applies to the function levels provided for in the organisation chart?” 12 Both questions seek to clarify the scope of the derogation from the principle of equal treatment allowed by article 2(4) of Directive (76/207/E.E.C.) and should therefore be examined together. 13 The national court asks, essentially, whether article 2(1) and (4) of Directive (76/207/E.E.C.) precludes national rules such as those in the present case which, where candidates of different sexes shortlisted for promotion are equally qualified, automatically give priority to women in sectors where they are under-represented, under-representation being deemed to exist when women do not make up at least half of the staff in the individual pay brackets in the relevant personnel group or in the function levels provided for in the organisation chart. 14 In its order for reference, the national court points out that a quota system such as that in issue may help to overcome in the future the disadvantages which women currently face and which perpetuate past inequalities, inasmuch as it accustoms people to seeing women also filling certain more senior posts. The traditional assignment of certain tasks to women and the concentration of women at the lower end of the scale are contrary to the equal rights criteria applicable today. In that connection, the national court cites figures illustrating the low proportion of women in the higher career brackets among city employees in Bremen, particularly if sectors such as education, where the presence of women in higher posts is now established, are excluded. 15 The purpose of Directive (76/207/E.E.C.) is, as stated in article 1(1), to put into effect in the member states the principle of equal treatment for men and women as regards, inter alia, access to employment, including promotion. Article 2(1) states that the principle of equal treatment means that “there shall be no discrimination whatsoever on grounds of sex either directly or indirectly.” 16 A national rule that, where men and women who are candidates for the same promotion are equally qualified, women are automatically to be given priority in sectors where they are under-represented involves discrimination on grounds of sex. 17 It must, however, be considered whether such a national rule is permissible under article 2(4), which provides that Directive (76/207/E.E.C.): “shall be without prejudice to measures to promote equal opportunity for men and women, in particular by removing existing inequalities which affect women's opportunities …” 18 That provision is specifically and exclusively designed to allow measures which, although discriminatory in appearance, are in fact *332 intended to eliminate or reduce actual instances of inequality which may exist in the reality of social life: see Commission of the European Communities v. French Republic (Case 312/86) [1988] E.C.R. 6315, 6336, para. 15. 19 It thus permits national measures relating to access to employment, including promotion, which give a specific advantage to women with a view to improving their ability to compete on the labour market and to pursue a career on an equal footing with men. 20 As the Council considered in the third recital in the preamble to Recommendation (84/635/E.E.C.) of 13 December 1984 on the promotion of positive action for women: “existing legal provisions on equal treatment, which are designed to afford rights to individuals, are inadequate for the elimination of all existing inequalities unless parallel action is taken by governments, both sides of industry and other bodies concerned, to counteract the prejudicial effects on women in employment which arise from social attitudes, behaviour and structures; …” 21 Nevertheless, as a derogation from an individual right laid down in Directive (76/207/E.E.C.), article 2(4) must be interpreted strictly: see Johnston v. Chief Constable of the Royal Ulster Constabulary (Case 222/84) [1987] I.C.R. 83, 104, para. 36. 22 National rules which guarantee women absolute and unconditional priority for appointment or promotion go beyond promoting equal opportunities and overstep the limits of the exception in article 2(4) of Directive (76/207/E.E.C.). 23 Furthermore, in so far as it seeks to achieve equal representation of men and women in all grades and levels within a department, such a system substitutes for equality of opportunity as envisaged in article 2(4) the result which is only to be arrived at by providing such equality of opportunity. 24 The answer to the national court's questions must therefore be that article 2(1) and (4) of Directive (76/207/E.E.C.) precludes national rules such as those in the present case which, where candidates of different sexes shortlisted for promotion are equally qualified, automatically give priority to women in sectors where they are under-represented, under-representation being deemed to exist when women do not make up at least half of the staff in the individual pay brackets in the relevant personnel group or in the function levels provided for in the organisation chart. Costs 25 The costs incurred by the United Kingdom and the Commission of the European Communities, which have submitted observations to the court, are not recoverable. Since these proceedings are, for the parties to the main proceedings, a step in the action pending before the national court, the decision on costs is a matter for that court. On those grounds, the court, in answer to the questions referred to it by the Bundesarbeitsgericht by order of 22 June 1993, hereby rules:

- 333

Article 2(1) and (4) of Council Directive (76/207/E.E.C.) of 9 February 1976 on the implementation of the principle of equal treatment for men and women as regards access to employment, vocational training and promotion, and working conditions precludes national rules such as those in the present case which, where candidates of different sexes shortlisted for promotion are equally qualified, automatically give priority to women in sectors where they are under-represented, under-representation being deemed to exist when women do not make up at least half of the staff in the individual pay brackets in the relevant personnel group or in the function levels provided for in the organisation chart.
