= Youth mainstreaming =

Advocacy for youth concerns in governance

Youth mainstreaming is a public policy concept. The Commonwealth of Nations describes it in this context:

National youth development is often the sole responsibility of the government ministry or department where the youth portfolio lies, whereas youth issues should be mainstreamed across various sectors and line ministries such as health, finance, economic development, housing, justice, foreign affairs, education, and agriculture.

It is modeled on gender mainstreaming, which the United Nations defined in the 1990s as:

the process of assessing the implications for women and men of any planned action, including legislation, policies or programmes, in all areas and at all levels. It is a strategy for making women's as well as men's concerns and experiences an integral dimension of the design, implementation, monitoring and evaluation of policies and programmes in all political, economic and societal spheres so that women and men benefit equally and inequality is not perpetuated.

== Strategy ==
Youth mainstreaming is a two-fold strategy for pursuing youth development. Inspired by the experience of gender mainstreaming, it involves ensuring youth is reflected in policy and project stages in various sectors and ensuring there are specific projects addressing youth. Together these add up to a youth responsive approach.

By reflecting, addressing, being sensitive to, and being responsive to youth issues, mainstreaming is meant to both looking at the impact of a policy/project on young women and men, and involve young men and women in order to ensure youth participation in the decision-making of those policies and/or projects that affects them.

Advocates of youth mainstreaming point out that young people represent a disadvantaged and marginalised social group, being over-represented among the global poor and unemployed. As such it is argued that "pro-poor" strategies must be "pro-youth", and that any development intervention seeking sustainable impact must address the youth cohort.

=== Purposes ===
The purposes of youth mainstreaming include:

- Avoiding perpetuating and/or reinforcing the marginalisation of young people
- Confronting society's stigmatization of young people as deviant, criminal, incapable etc.
- Maximizing the positive impact of policies and/or projects upon young people
- Promoting inter-generational transfer of knowledge and positive cultural values
- Investing in young people: realise the benefits of engaging them as a human resource
- Respecting the right of young people to participate in decision-making (for under 18s this is enshrined in Article 12 of the UN Convention on the Rights of the Child).
- Benefiting from young people’s knowledge, skills, ideas and practical contributions
- Empowering young people, which is a Commonwealth objective under the "Plan of Action for Youth Empowerment".

== See also ==
- Adultism
- Youth-adult partnerships
- Gender mainstreaming
