= Marschall v Land Nordrhein Westfalen =

German and EU labour law case concerning positive action

- Court: European Court of Justice
- Decided: 11 November 1997
- Citation: (1997) C-409/95, [1997] ECR I-06363, [1996] ICR 45

Keywords
- Positive action

Marschall v Land Nordrhein Westfalen (1997) C-409/95 is a German and EU labour law case concerning positive action.

== Facts ==
Marschall was a teacher. He applied for promotion and did not get it and a woman did. The school's rules allowed for promotion of women 'unless reasons specific to an individual candidate tilt the balance in his favour'. He sought an order that he was in fact appointed. The Verwaltungsgericht Gelsenkirchen made a reference to the ECJ asking whether the rule was compatible with the Equal Treatment Directive 76/207/EC art 2(1) and 2(4).

Advocate General Jacobs gave his opinion that the rule in question was compatible with EU law.

== Judgment ==
The European Court of Justice held that positive action was lawful if (1) the employer had a 'saving clause' so it could take into account objective factors specific to an individual man (2) the criteria in such a procedure did not discriminate against female candidates. The art 2(4) derogation could be triggered where positive action aimed to counteract 'the prejudicial effects on female candidates' of stereotyped attitudes about women at work.

23 in paragraph 16 of its judgment in Kalanke, the Court held that a national rule which provides that, where equally qualified men and women are candidates for the same promotion in fields where there are fewer women than men at the level of the relevant post, women are automatically to be given priority, involves discrimination on grounds of sex.

24 However, unlike the provisions in question in Kalanke, the provision in question in this case contains a clause ('Öffnungsklausel', hereinafter 'saving clause') to the effect that women are not to be given priority in promotion if reasons specific to an individual male candidate tilt the balance in his favour.

25 It is therefore necessary to consider whether a national rule containing such a clause is designed to promote equality of opportunity between men and women within the meaning of Article 2(4) of the Directive.

26 Article 2(4) is specifically and exclusively designed to authorize measures which, although discriminatory in appearance, are in fact intended to eliminate or reduce actual instances of inequality which may exist in the reality of social life (Case 312/86 Commission v France [1988] ECR 6315, paragraph 15, and Kalanke, paragraph 18).

27 It thus authorizes national measures relating to access to employment, including promotion, which give a specific advantage to women with a view to improving their ability to compete on the labour market and to pursue a career on an equal footing with men (Kalanke, paragraph 19).

28 As the Council stated in the third recital in the preamble to Recommendation 84/635/EEC of 13 December 1984 on the promotion of positive action for women (OJ 1984 L 331, p. 34), 'existing legal provisions on equal treatment, which are designed to afford rights to individuals, are inadequate for the elimination of all existing inequalities unless parallel action is taken by governments, both sides of industry and other bodies concerned, to counteract the prejudicial effects on women in employment which arise from social attitudes, behaviour and structures' (Kalanke, paragraph 20).

29 As the Land and several governments have pointed out, it appears that even where male and female candidates are equally qualified, male candidates tend to be promoted in preference to female candidates particularly because of prejudices and stereotypes concerning the role and capacities of women in working life and the fear, for example, that women will interrupt their careers more frequently, that owing to household and family duties they will be less flexible in their working hours, or that they will be absent from work more frequently because of pregnancy, childbirth and breastfeeding.

30 For these reasons, the mere fact that a male candidate and a female candidate are equally qualified does not mean that they have the same chances.

31 It follows that a national rule in terms of which, subject to the application of the saving clause, female candidates for promotion who are equally qualified as the male candidates are to be treated preferentially in sectors where they are under-represented may fall within the scope of Article 2(4) if such a rule may counteract the prejudicial effects on female candidates of the attitudes and behaviour described above and thus reduce actual instances of inequality which may exist in the real world.

32 However, since Article 2(4) constitutes a derogation from an individual right laid down by the Directive, such a national measure specifically favouring female candidates cannot guarantee absolute and unconditional priority for women in the event of a promotion without going beyond the limits of the exception laid down in that provision (Kalanke, paragraphs 21 and 22).

33 Unlike the rules at issue in Kalanke, a national rule which, as in the case in point in the main proceedings, contains a saving clause does not exceed those limits if, in each individual case, it provides for male candidates who are equally as qualified as the female candidates a guarantee that the candidatures will be the subject of an objective assessment which will take account of all criteria specific to the individual candidates and will override the priority accorded to female candidates where one or more of those criteria tilts the balance in favour of the male candidate. In this respect, however, it should be remembered that those criteria must not be such as to discriminate against female candidates.

34 It is for the national court to determine whether those conditions are fulfilled on the basis of an examination of the scope of the provision in question as it has been applied by the Land.

35 The answer to be given to the national court must therefore be that a national rule which, in a case where there are fewer women than men at the level of the relevant post in a sector of the public service, and both female and male candidates for the post are equally qualified in terms of their suitability, competence and professional performance, requires that priority be given to the promotion of female candidates unless reasons specific to an individual male candidate tilt the balance in his favour is not precluded by Article 2(1) and (4) of the Directive, provided that:

- in each individual case the rule provides for male candidates who are equally as qualified as the female candidates a guarantee that the candidatures will be the subject of an objective assessment which will take account of all criteria specific to the individual candidates and will override the priority accorded to female candidates where one or more of those criteria tilts the balance in favour of the male candidate, and
- such criteria are not such as to discriminate against the female candidates..
