= Re Badeck's application =

Re Badeck’s application
- Court: European Court of Justice
- Decided: 28 March 2000
- Citations: (2000) C-158/97, [2001] 2 CMLR 6

Keywords
- Positive action

Re Badeck's application (2000) C-158/97 is a German and EU labour law case concerning positive action.

== Facts ==
The First Minister and Attorney General of Hesse, CDU member Georg Badeck, wanted to review a Hesse law which set out a list of positive action measures for appointment to public office. They argued it violated the German Grundgesetz constitutional duty to get the best people for the job, and violated the Equal Treatment Directive 76/207/EC articles 2(1) and 2(4).

== Judgment ==
The European Court of Justice held that priority for under represented groups was lawful, but that priority could not be automatic. The following public sector positive action measures were in fact legitimate under article 2(4): (1) aiming to get a parity split of men and women in the public sector, (2) providing a quota for female academic staff too, (3) reserving half the training places in certain fields for women, (4) providing that suitably qualified women would be guaranteed an interview, and an equal number to men. The summary of the judgment on the limits and what is not precluded by EU law was stated as follows.

Article 2(1) and (4) of Directive 76/207 on the implementation of the principle of equal treatment for men and women as regards access to employment, vocational training and promotion, and working conditions does not preclude a national rule which,

- in sectors of the public service where women are under-represented, gives priority, where male and female candidates have equal qualifications, to female candidates where that proves necessary for ensuring compliance with the objectives of the women's advancement plan, if no reasons of greater legal weight are opposed, provided that that rule guarantees that candidatures are the subject of an objective assessment which takes account of the specific personal situations of all candidates,
- prescribes that the binding targets of the women's advancement plan for temporary posts in the academic service and for academic assistants must provide for a minimum percentage of women which is at least equal to the percentage of women among graduates, holders of higher degrees and students in each discipline,
- in so far as its objective is to eliminate under-representation of women, in trained occupations in which women are under-represented and for which the State does not have a monopoly of training, allocates at least half the training places to women, unless despite appropriate measures for drawing the attention of women to the training places available there are not enough applications from women,
- where male and female candidates have equal qualifications, guarantees that qualified women who satisfy all the conditions required or laid down are called to interview, in sectors in which they are under-represented,
- relating to the composition of employees' representative bodies and administrative and supervisory bodies, recommends that the legislative provisions adopted for its implementation take into account the objective that at least half the members of those bodies must be women.
