= Special measures for gender equality in the United Nations =

The United Nations Secretariat, in September 1999, promulgated Administrative Instruction (AI) on "Special Measures for the Achievement Of Gender Equality" (ST/AI/1999/9, also Gender Equality A/I), to strengthen and expedite measures to achieve gender equality in the United Nations' staff, especially in posts in the Professional category. Gender Equality A/I (ST/AI/1999/9), which superseded ST/AI/412 of 5 January 1996, came into effect on 1 October 1999. In 2012, Ban Ki-moon, the Secretary-General of the United Nations, in his Annual Reports to the General Assembly, titled "Improvement of the status of women in the United Nations system" stated that Special Measures are "procedures designed to accelerate the achievement of gender parity at the Professional levels and above" and that the aim of these procedures was to ensure "gender balance in recruitment and promotion" and rectify "past and current forms and effects of discrimination against women". The Secretary General reiterated that Special measures for gender equality would remain in effect until the "goal of gender parity is achieved, and would be sustained for a period of time".

Gender Equality A/I echoes the goals of, and is in conformity with, mandate of Articles 8 and 101 of the Charter of the United Nations, and Article 4 paragraph 1 of the Convention on the Elimination of All Forms of Discrimination against Women (CEDAW).

== Convention on the Elimination of All Forms of Discrimination Against Women (CEDAW) ==
=== Article 4 paragraph 1, CEDAW ===
The CEDAW or the Convention, also known as the international Bill of Women's Rights, is a legally binding international treaty ratified by 187 States Parties, that entered into force in 1981. All parties to CEDAW, including the UN, are bound to honor it. The UN Doctrine of Gender Equality, and 'Special Measures for Gender Equality' are inspired by and rooted in the CEDAW, specifically in Article 4 paragraph 1, which states:

"Article 4, paragraph 1: Adoption by States Parties of temporary special measures aimed at accelerating de facto equality between men and women shall not be considered discrimination as defined in the present Convention, but shall in no way entail as a consequence the maintenance of unequal or separate standards; these measures shall be discontinued when the objectives of equality of opportunity and treatment have been achieved. [emphasis added]."

=== General Recommendation No. 25, on Article 4, paragraph 1 of CEDAW ===
The United Nations Committee on the Elimination of Discrimination against Women (CEDAW), an expert body composed of 23 experts on women's issues established in 1982 to monitor the progress of the CEDAW's implementation, in 2004, adopted General Recommendation 25, on Temporary Special Measures, on Article 4 paragraph 1 of the Convention on the Elimination of All Forms of Discrimination against Women. The general recommendation "clarifies the nature and meaning of article 4, paragraph 1, in order to facilitate and ensure the implementation of Temporary special measures and accelerate progress in achieving gender equality in employment and professional fields".

The purpose of the "special measures", which are 'temporary' is "to accelerate the improvement of the position of women to achieve their "substantive equality with men, and to effect the structural, social and cultural changes necessary to correct past and current forms and effects of discrimination against women, as well as to provide them with compensation." These are not an exception 'to the norm of non-discrimination', but rather 'part of a necessary strategy' to achieve 'substantive equality of women'. The 'temporary special measures', includes 'preferential treatment; targeted recruitment, hiring and promotion; numerical goals connected with time frames; and quota systems'.

=== UN and Article 4, paragraph 1 on Special Measures ===
The UN Committee on CEDAW in its general recommendations number 25 commended the Secretary General on his initiative to implement 'temporary special measures', noting "The use of temporary special measures by the Secretary-General of the United Nations is a practical example in the area of women's employment, including through administrative instructions on the recruitment, promotion and placement of women in the Secretariat. These measures aim at achieving the goal of 50/50 gender distribution at all levels, but at the higher echelons in particular".

In 2012, the UN Secretary General drawing attention to Article 4 paragraph 1 of the Convention on the Elimination of All Forms of Discrimination against Women (CEDAW) assured the General Assembly that Special Measures were temporary, and will "be discontinued when gender parity has been achieved and sustained for a period of time".

== Gender inequality in the UN ==
Gender equality in the United Nations (UN), particularly at managerial and decision-making positions at the D-1 level and above level, has been a United Nations General Assembly goal since 1970 and a recurring concern since then. In 1984, the UN Secretariat, in order to better focus efforts to wards achieving Gender Equality, prepared its first five-year "Action plan to improve the status of women for the period 1985–90". Since then there have been several Five Year Plans, including Strategic Plans, to Improve the Status of Women in the UN. In 1990, the United Nations General Assembly after years of slow progress, urged the Secretary General to "accord priority" to increase "the participation of women at the D-1 level and above to 25 per cent" by 1995. In December 1994, the UN General Assembly "disappointment" that the targets set in 1990 were not achieved and that women in posts at the D-1 level were "still well below the 25 per cent goal", urged the Secretary General to prioritize the recruitment and promotion of women to reach to 50/50 representation in D1 and above posts by 2000. In February 2004, in the context of the continuing sluggish progress in achieving the target of gender parity the General Assembly revised the target for achieving 50/50 goal to 2015. Gender parity in the UN has become a distant goal, and since 2005 the UN has stopped indicating the target year when gender parity will be achieved.

=== Representation of women in decision-making positions ===
Women's representation in the UN secretariat, at the D1 level, in 2000, was 30.3 percent. By 2009, the representation of women in the secretariat at D1 level decreased to 26.7 percent; by way comparison the representation in the entire UN system in 2009 was 29.2 percent.

The representation of women in 2011 in the secretariat at D2 level was 24.4 percent. In December 2011, the representation of women in the Secretariat at the D1 level was 27.4 percent, an increase of .6 percent over a two-year period. At the current rate of progress, according to the secretary general's report, gender parity at the D-1 to higher levels will be achieved after 102 years.

=== Reasons for continuing gender equality ===
Reasons most frequently cited for failure to meet the General Assembly targets for Gender Equality, and slide in women's representation at the D1 and above level, according to the Secretary General, are: [a] failure by some "entities" in the "implementation of special measures for gender equality", and [b] tardy implementation of five year Actions Plans [para 143]. In 2010–2011, only two out of thirty departments in the UN applied the "target of gender parity" [A/67/347, p. 46, paragraph 110(b)]. The UN Secretariat, the largest entity in the United Nations system, in which 38.7 percent of the staff is women, according to the report, claimed to be one of them.

== Special measures for the achievement of gender equality ==
The Special Measures in ST/AI/1999/9, which has four sections, apply throughout the Secretariat "for the filling of all vacant posts in the Professional category and above", including temporary posts. Sections 1.6 and 1.8 of the ST/AI makes clear that special measures "shall apply to the selection of staff for posts in all categories where women are under-represented".

=== Goal ===
The Goal of the Special Measures as set by the General Assembly is to achieve a 50/50 gender distribution in the entire organization and all departments, and in all "posts in the professional category and above, including posts at the D1 level and above. This goal applies throughout the Organization, and in every department, office or regional commission, overall and at each level. It applies not only to posts subject to geographical distribution but to all categories of posts, irrespective of the type or duration of the appointment ..., the series of the Staff Rules under which the appointment is to be given ... or the source of funding. ..."

=== Cumulative seniority ===
Section 1.6 of ST/AI/1999/9 mandates that "Cumulative seniority shall be taken into account when considering women candidates for promotion, except when it would adversely affect their situation. Cumulative seniority shall be calculated as the average of the years of the staff member accrued in her present Professional grade and in her immediately preceding Professional grade".

=== Selection appointment ===
Section 1.8 of ST/AI/1999/9 mandates "Vacancies in the Professional category and above shall be filled, when there are one or more women candidates, by one of those candidates" when "Her qualifications meet the requirements for the vacant post"; and "her qualifications are substantially equal (emphasis added) or superior to those of competing male candidates" (Section 1.8 (i)(ii)).

== Implementation and monitoring ==
The Heads of Departments (HODs) of UN entities are responsible, and accountable, for the implementation of the special measures, and the Office of Human Resources (OHRM), under the Department of Management (DM), is responsible for monitoring the implementation of the special measures. The Steering Committee for the Improvement of the Status of Women in the Secretariat (ST/SGB/1999/9) is responsible for monitoring and implementation of policies of gender equality, including Special Measures.

== Status ==
=== Appointments, placement and promotion ===
The current policies for appointments, placement and promotion to obtain gender equality in the United Nations system are outlined in ST/SGB/282 (Policies to Achieve Gender Equality in the United Nations), and ST/AI/1999/9 (Special Measures for Achievement of Gender Equality), which entered into force on 1 October 1999. Gender Equality A/I is listed under the heading "Appointments, placement and promotion" in the Index to Administrative Issuance in effect as on 31 December 2013. The Gender Equality A/I is in force, and will remain in effect, as the UN secretariat has made clear, "until specifically amended or abolished".

=== UN Women ===
The United Nations Entity for Gender Equality and the Empowerment of Women, known as UN Women, the United Nations entity responsible for 'gender equality', and holding "the UN system accountable for its own commitments on gender equality" has also promulgated that the Gender Parity A/I will "remain in effect until the Secretary-General is satisfied that substantial progress towards the goal of gender balance has been made".

== Secretary General Report on Special Measures ==
Special Measures have found regular affirmation by the Secretary General in his reports to the General Assembly. In 2011, Secretary-General's Policy Committee, of which all heads of departments (HOD) are members, including HOD of management, decided on "specific actions" to "accelerate progress towards the goal of gender parity". An important measure identified for action was measures for more effective implementations of Special Measures. The Secretary General in the "Report of the Secretary General" to the General Assembly, in September 2012, to accelerate the goal of gender parity, affirmed the following:

- Special measures, include "targeted recruitment and promotion"
- Temporary special measures, paraphrasing section 1.8 of ST/AI 1999/9, "should be effectively utilized for the placement of women candidates who are equally or substantially better qualified and should be introduced or restored in entities and at levels where progress is slow".
- Special measures "include mandatory selection of equally or better qualified women candidates, mandatory inclusion of women candidates on all shortlists, and justification in cases where they have not been included or where the shortlisted women are not selected despite prevailing imbalance at that level"
- Special measures, in ST/AI 1999/9 to be revised and strengthened, to ensure effective implementation
- Senior officials to ensure "effective implementation of special measures for gender equality."
- Special Measures are temporary and will "be discontinued when gender parity has been achieved and sustained for a period of time";
- In the context of the legal challenges to Special Measures in the United Nations, and hesitant implementation by some UN entities, the Secretary General drew attention to the judgment by the United Nations Administrative Tribunal, in November 1994, and reiterated that "special measures are fully compatible with the objectives of Article 8 of the Charter of the United Nations".

== New staff selection system and Gender Equality A/I ==
The United Nations Secretariat, in April 2010, superseded the old Staff selection system (ST/AI/ 2006/3/Rev.1) with a new staff selection system (ST/AI 2010/3). The new Staff selection system was listed in 2014 with Gender Affirmative A/I ((ST/AI 1999/9)) as applicable law for Appointments, placement and promotion.

The 'final provision' of the new staffing system which entered into force on 22 April 2010 in section 13.3 notes that "The provisions of the present administrative instruction shall prevail over any inconsistent provisions contained in other administrative instructions and information circulars currently in force". There was a similar provision in the earlier Administrative instruction Staff selection system (ST /AI/2006/3) as well. The UN Secretariat since 2010, citing section 13.3 of the new Staff Selection System (ST/AI 2010/3), has, some times, contended that provision of section 13.3 supersede Gender Equality A/I(ST/AI 1999/9), especially section 1.8 on affirmative action, as Gender A/I is inconsistent with 2010/3. UN Women, the agency designated to implement UN Gender Policy, however, continues to assert, including on its web site, that affirmative action for women remain in effect, and continues to be list it as applicable law. The Secretary General has also affirmed to the general assembly, as noted above, that Gender A/I, remains in effect. As a result of the secretariat's reservation, and reluctance to implement gender A/I, it has been implemented with diminishing enthusiasm, and become a frequent cause of litigation.

== Jurisprudence ==
UNAT jurisprudence has, in its consideration of unsuccessful male candidates, as well as claims of women under the Organization's affirmative action policies, repeatedly upheld affirmative action provisions in ST/AI/412 and its successor ST/AI 1999/9, as lawful and in accordance with the UN Charter. ST/AI 1999/9. ST/AI 1999/9 continues to be cited as an applicable instrument by applicants, as well as the respondent, in cases before the UN Dispute Tribunal (UNDT) and the United Nations Appeals Tribunal (UNAT).

=== Judgement No. 671, Grinblat (1994) ===
United Nations Administrative tribunal with Judge Sumar Sen as president, in a seminal Judgment on affirmative action, held: "that the various resolutions for Improvement of the status of women in the Secretariat which have been referred to and statements of the Secretary-General have conceded the existence of an unsatisfactory history with respect to the recruitment and promotion of women that does not accord with Article 8 of the Charter. In such circumstances, the Tribunal considers that Article 8 of the Charter must be regarded as a source of authority for reasonable efforts to improve the status of women. It would be anomalous indeed if this unsatisfactory history had to remain unremedied for an unduly long period. Unless affirmative action measures are taken towards ameliorating the effects of this past history, they will, without doubt, be perpetuated for many years. This is incompatible with the objectives of Article 8, as recognized by the General Assembly. Hence, the Tribunal concludes that Article 8 permits the adoption of reasonable affirmative action measures for improvement of the status of women." The Tribunal added that, "as long as affirmative action is required to redress the gender imbalance with which the Secretary-General and the General Assembly have been concerned, Article 8 of the Charter would permit, as a reasonable measure, preferential treatment to women candidates where their qualifications are substantially equal to the qualifications of competing male candidates; obviously such a preference is not needed if a woman's qualifications are superior". The Tribunal, however, cautioned that affirmative action, however laudable, did not justify any weakening of the requirements of Article 101 (3) of the Charter that officials of the Organization be of "the highest standards of efficiency, competence and integrity": "In evaluating the reasonableness of affirmative action measures, pertinent provisions of the Charter may not be ignored. The Tribunal considers that, with respect to affirmative action measures, it would be impermissible to view Article 8 of the Charter as overriding Article 101 (3) ... This language unequivocally establishes a standard under which less qualified persons are not entitled to preferential treatment based on gender. The fundamental principle reflected in Article 101 (3) may not be diluted by a desire, however commendable, to overcome past problems." The Tribunal concluded that, "as long as affirmative action is required to redress the gender imbalance with which the Secretary-General and the General Assembly have been concerned, Article 8 of the Charter would permit, as a reasonable measure, preferential treatment to women candidates where their qualifications are substantially equal to the qualifications of competing male candidates (emphasis added); obviously such a preference is not needed if a woman's qualifications are superior".

=== Judgement No. 765, Anderson Bieler (1996) ===
United Nations Administrative Tribunal, with Mr. Luis de Posadas Montero, Vice-President, Presiding, reaffirmed Grinblat (1992), and held that "the affirmative action measure establishes a right to preferential treatment for women whose qualifications 'are substantially equal to the qualifications of competing male candidates'", and ruled that "as the Applicant was the only woman short-listed for the post, and as she was equally, if not more, qualified for the post, she had a right to promotion, in the light of ST/SGB/237".

=== Judgement No. 1056, Katz (2002) ===
United Nations Administrative Tribunal (Mr. Mayer Gabay, President; Ms. Marsha A. Echols; and Mr. Omer Yousif Bireedo) in the case of an unsuccessful male candidate who challenged the promotion of a woman as unlawful and in violation of his rights of due process, citing UNAT Judgements No. 411 (1988) and No. 958 (2000), recalled its "established jurisprudence ... that appointments and promotions are within the discretionary authority of the Secretary-General", and that "qualifications, experience, favourable performance reports and seniority are appraised freely by the Secretary-General and therefore cannot be considered by staff members as giving rise to any expectancy". The tribunal held that these "discretionary powers of the Secretary-General are not absolute. They are governed by the relevant provisions of the Charter and by General Assembly resolutions. In this context the Tribunal notes that ST/AI/412 provides that special measures for the achievement of gender equality within the Secretariat must be instituted towards achieving the goal of '50-50 parity between men and women both overall and for positions at the D-1 level and above by the year 2000. It also provides for flexibility in various promotion requirements in order to increase the number of women considered for promotions, for example flexibility regarding seniority."

The Tribunal concluded that the male candidate had received "full and fair consideration" for the post and that the Organization was not bound by the recommendation of the hiring department. The Tribunal held that the Secretary-General "acted within his discretionary authority in deciding to promote a substantially equally qualified female candidate to the D-1 level post".

=== Judgement No. 1302 (2006) ===
United Nations Administrative Tribunal (Mr. Spyridon Flogaitis, President; Mr. Kevin Haugh; Ms. Brigitte Stern) held that ST/AI/1999/9 required that where there are both male and female candidates with substantially equal qualifications, "the female candidate should be appointed unless the qualifications of the male candidate are in some demonstrable and measurable way superior to those of the best qualified female candidate. The Tribunal has chosen to use the words 'demonstrable' and 'measurable' advisedly for, since appointment and promotion decisions are amenable to administrative review under the Organization's internal justice system and under the Statute of the Tribunal, and since the body carrying out such review ... should act on identifiable facts and on evidence, there should be evidence which can be examined and assessed by the body carrying out the review from which it can be determined if the affirmative action requirements have been fully complied with. This is an essential requirement if there is to be a meaningful review and if the policy of ST/AI/1999/9 or other affirmative action policy is to be enforced as an imperative. Otherwise, such policies become mere shibboleths or mere set pieces of lip service invoked in the pretence of achieving their objectives." The tribunal concluded that although as a general principle, the party making an allegation bears the burden of proving it, but "this general proposition must require modification where the relevant evidence is solely in the hands of the Administration and not available to an Applicant, the onus of proof in certain matters should be viewed as neutral rather than as resting on the Applicant". The Tribunal, while agreeing with the conclusions of the Joint Appeals Board (JAB) that "since there was no demonstrable or measurable evidence to support a conclusion that the successful male candidate enjoyed substantially superior qualifications when compared with those of the Applicant, a breach of ST/AI/1999/9 [had] been established". Accordingly, the Tribunal ordered the Respondent to pay the Applicant the difference between her salary at the P-3 level and the P-4 salary that she would have received had she been appointed to the post in question, from October 2002, for the lesser of either two years or until her promotion to the P-4 level, and ordered the Respondent either to place the Applicant on the "Galaxy roster" until she secures a suitable post at the P-4 level or to pay her two months' net base salary.

=== Appleton (2012) ===
In August 2012, the Organization acknowledged ST/AI/1999/9 (Special measures for achieving Gender Equality) as applicable law on gender balance, noting that "The general provisions to give women preferential treatment for appointments are found in ST/AI/1999/9" and that "selection, vacancies shall be filled by a woman if her qualifications: (a) meet the requirements for the vacant post and (b) are substantially equal or superior to those of competing male candidates (sec. 1.8)". The Tribunal Judge Coral Shaw confirmed the mandatory character of the "rules in ST/AI/1999/9 concerning preferential treatment of women in selection processes".

=== Farrimond (2014) ===
In August 2014, the UN administration conceded in a United Nations Dispute Tribunal hearing that administrative instruction ST/AI/1999/9 (Special measures for the achievement of Gender Equality), was valid in a selection process. While examining "whether the relevant sections of that administrative instruction have been correctly applied to the case at hand", the Tribunal Judge Thomas Laker concluded that the Administration failed to respect provision of the ST/AI 1999/9 and rescinded the selection decision, for this and other infractions."

=== Tribunal judgments and orders related to ST/AI/1999/9 (Gender AI) ===
Gender A/I, as already mentioned, has often been a subject of litigation. In cases brought before the tribunal, the respondent, i.e., the Secretary General, has, so far, not contested the applicability of the gender AI as applicable law. The tribunal in several cases has upheld the validity of Gender AI and cited it in its judgment. A tabulation of the salient cases in which gender A/I has been a subject of litigation, and judgments by the tribunal, is below:

Year	Case/ Judgement	Section of AI	SG/ Respondent's Response to gender AI	Tribunal's Ruling
2010	James, 2010-UNAT-009	2.1 /2.2	ST/AI/1999/9, not questioned, accepted as applicable law	not applicable to male candidate
2012	Appleton	1.5 / 1.8	do	Listed as applicable law The Tribunal also notes that the mandatory rules in ST/AI/1999/9 concerning preferential treatment of women in selection processes only applies if the female candidate in question is found suitable for the job and her qualifications are substantially equal or superior to that of the male competitors. The Tribunal Judge Coral Shaw confirmed the mandatory character of the "rules in ST/AI/1999/9 concerning preferential treatment of women in selection processes".
2013	Asariotis, 2013-UNAT-309		do	
2014	Zhao, Zhuang, Xi, UNDT/2014/036	1.8 (a – d)	Test of 1.8(a) [para. 27(l)]	Woman candidate did not meet 1.8 (a) [79] Administration failed to meet 1.8 (d) [82], grounds for rescinding decision Used ST/AI/1999/9 to assess likelihood of success and compensation for administration's failure to meet 1.8 (d) [85]
2014	Farrimond, UNDT/2014/068	1.8 (a-d)	Respondent conceded applicability of ST/AI/1999/9 Test of 1.8(d) Asked tribunal to consider if "the selection memorandum satisfies the formal requirements of ST/AI/1999/9" A written memorandum was also produced in accordance with 1.8 (d)	The Tribunal finds that the few lines do not meet minimum standards of a written analysis as required by sect. 1.8(d), and that in the absence of a written analysis with appropriate supporting documentation as required under sec. 1.8(d) of ST/AI/1999/9, the Tribunal cannot but conclude that the Administration failed to respect said provision Sufficient to rescind the post [41]
2014	Farrimond, Order No. 200 (GVA/2013)	1.8 (a – d)	ST/AI/1999/9, accepted as applicable law Test of 1.8(a) [para. 14 e]	Relied upon ST/AI/1999/9 1.8 to rule that selection process met the criteria for prima facie illegality [29–34; 50–51]

== See also ==
- Convention on the Elimination of All Forms of Discrimination against Women
- Gender equality
- Gender inequality
- Gender mainstreaming
- Gender Parity Index
- Beijing Declaration
- Declaration on the Elimination of Discrimination against Women
- UN Secretariat
- UN Women
- Women's rights
