= Abortion in Taiwan =

Abortion in Taiwan is generally accessible through the 24th week of pregnancy under various circumstances and legally available afterwards when deemed medically necessary. It was legalized by the Genetic Health Act (Chinese: 優生保健法), enacted in 1985 and last amended in 2009, which makes abortion accessible for unmarried adult women as well as married women whose husbands are legally considered incapable or have genetic conditions in their family, while married women with a legally competent spouse and minors/adult women placed under a custodianship need to obtain consent from their spouse and guardian respectively.

== History ==
The Siraya people were observed to practice mandatory abortion by Dutch colonizers, which modern scholars have found to be part of a taboo that a women's pregnancy would adversely impact her husbands performance in war. This reflected a broader pattern of gendered separation until the man became recognized as an elder at the age of forty, after which it was societally permissible for his wife, often younger by a number of years, to carry a pregnancy to term. Continued influence from Dutch missionaries led to the Siraya ending this practice and allowing newlyweds to live with each other.

Abortion was common in premodern Taiwan (as well as China) before being made illegal when the Qing dynasty adopted a Western legal code in its later period. Abortion continued to be outlawed during the Japanese colonization, which placed Taiwan under Japanese criminal law, and the early Republic of China period. Under the penal code of Taiwan, abortion was illegal, including in response to rape. However, abortion was relatively common and easy to obtain in Taiwan during this period, with a 1969 study finding that 10-20% of respondents had the procedure.

The "new feminism" movement headed by Annette Lu saw the criminalization of abortion as a core mechanism, along with patronymy, of patriarchal control over women's reproductive rights. To avoid persecution under the martial law era, activists argued that legalizing abortion would serve the government's population control policies, at times brushing off ethical quandaries about the government's support for eugenics and portraying lower class women as "ignorant" in their reproductive decisions. While the Genetic Health Act was drafted in 1971, its passage was stalled for thirteen years due to "ethics concerns" until 1984, when the Chiang Ching-kuo government prioritized family planning and eugenicist measures in response to increasing fears of overpopulation. Additionally, activists changed their campaigning in the 1980s to reflect positions of abortion as an issue of reproductive health and privacy, shifting political discourse around abortion to that of women's rights, and in 1984 petitioned the Legislative Yuan and the public twice with more conservative arguments to legalize abortion, which were the first feminist lobbying sessions in Taiwan. Following its passage, the act took effect in 1985.

Under the law, abortion is available under six conditions:

- Acquisition of a "genetic, infectious or psychiatric disease detrimental to reproductive health" by the parents
- Acquisition of a genetic disease within four degrees of relational separation from either parent
- The pregnancy threatens the bearer's life or adversely impacts their mental/psychical health
- Potential medical risk for teratogenesis (development of congenital abnormalities)
- For pregnancies that resulted from rape, sexual intercourse of false premises, or with a person who cannot legally be married to the bearer
- Likely effect on mental health or family life

The law in general has been seen as an indirect legalization of abortion on request due to the vague nature of its prose. The last condition has become the most common way to seek an abortion in Taiwan due to its ease of invocation, with some anti-abortion activists citing it as an obstacle to tightening restrictions on the procedure. The law's focus on eugenics, seen by the direct translation of the Chinese name being the "Eugenic Health Law", has continued to be criticized by feminists as discriminatory and lacking commitment to women's reproductive rights, as abortion is still technically criminalized by the penal code despite being legally accessible, and there are restrictions placed on married women and minors, who require spousal and parental consent in most cases. As of August 2026, Taiwan is one of ten countries that requires spousal consent for abortion.

The legislation was amended in 2009, with a provision that would have introduced mandatory counseling and a six-day waiting period being rejected amid pushback from women's rights activists. Religious groups attempted to reintroduce the stipulation in 2019 but failed to get enough support to put the issue on the ballot. In 2023, after continuing efforts from feminist organizations, an amendment abolishing the spousal consent requirement, modifying the minor consent process to be in line with the Convention on the Elimination of All Forms of Discrimination Against Women and renaming the legislation to the "Fertility Health Law" (Chinese: 生育保健法) was drafted, but is yet to be finalized by the Executive Yuan.

Unlike other countries, there is not a major debate over abortion in Taiwan; anti-abortion movements were largely "nonexistent" before 2002 and rose in the mid-2000s to support the proposal of mandatory counseling and waiting. However, stigma over underage pregnancy and issues with accessing abortion for minors has stimulated a belief in "fetus ghosts", considered a version of the Japanese concept of mizuko kuyō that gained popularity in Taiwan as a reaction the broadened availability of abortion. Thus, some teenagers have conducted Buddhist and Taoist post-abortion rituals to bless the fetus after the abortion to reduce the parent's guilt and karma, sparking varied responses from the religious establishment for the practice.
