= Abrahamsson and Anderson v Fogelqvist =

Labour law case

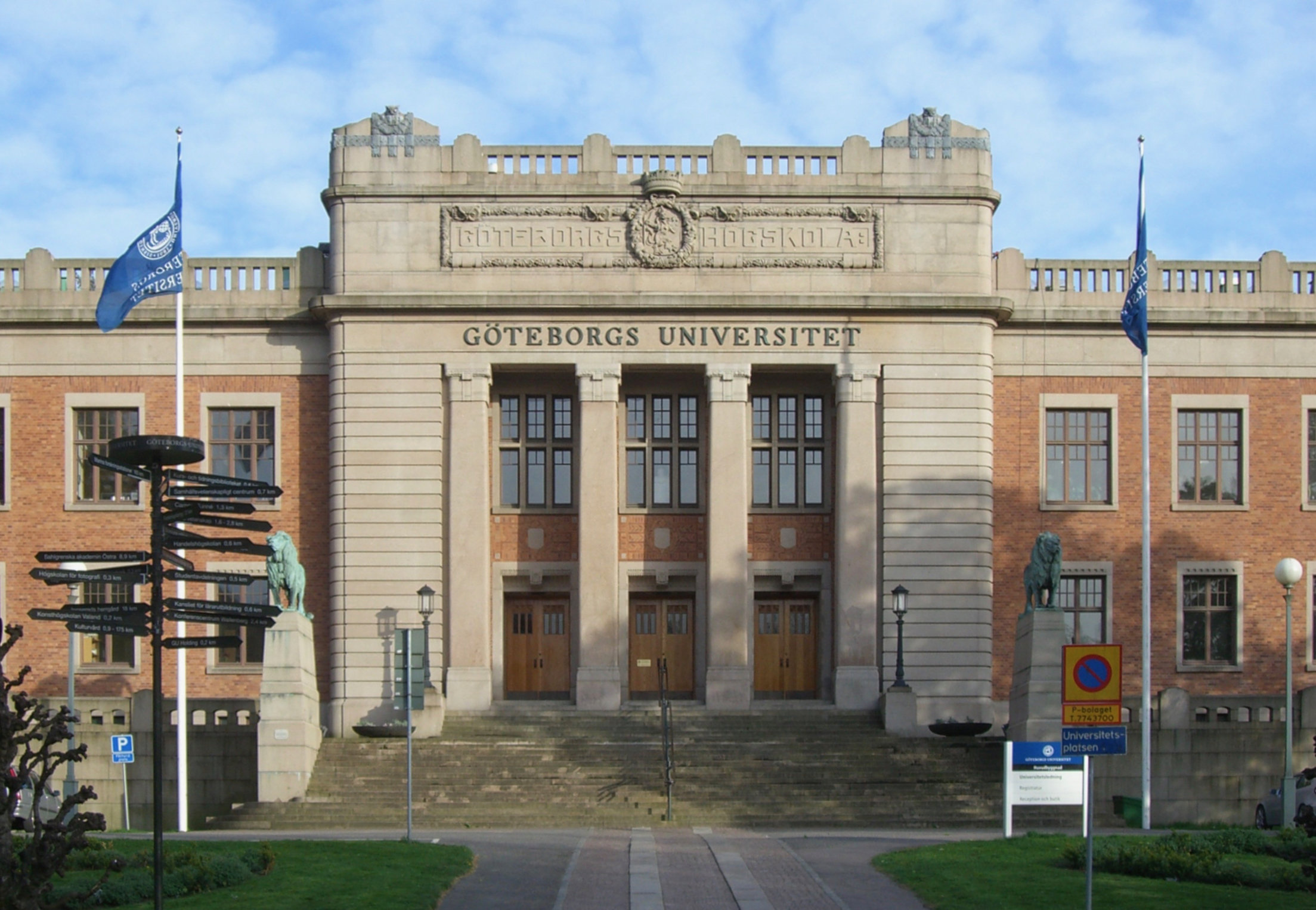
- University of Gothenburg
- Court: European Court of Justice
- Decided: 6 July 2000
- Citations: (2000) C-407/98, [2000] ECR I-05539

Keywords
- Positive discrimination

Abrahamsson and Anderson v Fogelqvist (2000) C-407/98 is a Swedish and EU labour law case, concerning positive action.

== Facts ==
Mr Anderson was slightly better qualified than his three female competitors for the post of Professor of Hydrospheric Science at the University of Gothenburg. But the job was offered to one of the women, Ms Destouni, and when she turned it down, another of the women, Ms Fogelqvist was given the job. Ms Abrahamsson had complained that she was also better than Ms Fogelqvist, but that Mr Anderson was better than her. The universities’ policy was to hire sufficiently qualified people in underrepresented group, even if that meant as in this case a less qualified woman, unless ‘the difference between the candidates’ qualification is so great that such application would give rise to a breach of the requirement of objectivity in the making of appointments.’ This policy was adopted after an earlier recruitment drive had failed.

== Judgment ==
The European Court of Justice held that this form of positive discrimination was unlawful because it overrode consideration of applicants' individual merits. A rule which required an underrepresented group to be promoted over the other was justified if two candidates were equally qualified and assessment was based on objective assessment of their personal situations. But that did not happen here. At paragraph 55 the Court stated,

55. ... even though Article 141(4) EC allows the Member States to maintain or adopt measures providing for special advantages intended to prevent or compensate for disadvantages in professional careers in order to ensure full equality between men and women in professional life, it cannot be inferred from this that it allows a selection method of the kind at issue in the main proceedings which appears, on any view, to be disproportionate to the aim pursued. 56. The answer to the first question must therefore be that Article 2(1) and (4) of the Directive and Article 141(4) EC preclude national legislation under which a candidate for a public post who belongs to the under-represented sex and possesses sufficient qualifications for that post must be chosen in preference to a candidate of the opposite sex who would otherwise have been appointed, where this is necessary to secure the appointment of a candidate of the under-represented sex and the difference between the respective merits of the candidates is not so great as to give rise to a breach of the requirement of objectivity in making appointments.

== See also ==
- Briheche v Ministre de l'Intérieur [2005] 1 CMLR 4 (C-319/03), rule struck down which indiscriminately favoured all widows over widowers, regardless of individual circumstances
- Lommers v Minister van Landbouw, Natuurbeheer en Visserij [2002] ECR-I 2891 (C-476/99), rule upheld restricting child care places to female employees, so long as men with child care responsibilities could also benefit
