= European Employment Strategy =

The 1997 Treaty of Amsterdam introduced the concept of a European Employment Strategy (EES), following on from the integrated strategy for employment launched at the Essen European Council in December 1994.

== Strategy ==
At Essen, the European Council had asked the Member States to draw up multiannual programmes for employment (MAPs) and to provide the Commission with reports on their implementation. These reports describe the main measures taken by the governments to apply their multiannual programmes over the previous twelve months, assess, in certain cases, the impact of those measures on employment, and announce major changes or new initiatives in this field.

The European Employment Strategy is built around priority themes under the four pillars of employability, entrepreneurship, adaptability and equal opportunities. Each year, the Member States draw up National Action Plans on Employment (NAPS) implementing these broad policy guidelines. The NAPS are analysed by the Commission and the Council, and the results, presented in a Joint Employment Report, serve as a basis for reprioritising and making recommendations to Member States in respect of their employment policies.

Five years after its launch, the European strategy entered a review phase.

In January 2003, the Commission adopted a communication presenting a new approach through the European Employment Strategy, better adapted to the needs of an ageing population, increasing women's participation in the labour market, enlargement and the increasing pace of economic change. Main priorities of the new strategy are full employment and better working conditions.

== See also ==
- EU law
- European labour law
- Europe 2020
