= Lee Yuan-Chen =

Lee Yuan-Chen (Chinese: 李元貞; born 1946) is an active feminist and one of the leading figures in Taiwan's feminist movements.

== Early life ==
Born in Kunming, the largest city of Yunnan province in pre-1949 China, Lee Yuan-Chen came to Taiwan with her parents at the age of three. Lee Yuan-Chen received both her bachelor's and master's degrees from the National Taiwan University, Department of Chinese literature, respectively in 1968 and in 1971. Inspired by Annette Lu, the pioneer of Taiwan's feminist movement, and triggered by a myriad of societal issues in Taiwan, Lee Yuan-Chen together with other Taiwanese feminists founded the Awakening magazine in 1982, during a historical period in which Taiwan was still under the martial law. As one of the founders and the leader of the Awakening magazine, Lee Yuan-Chen decided to transform it into the Awakening Foundation in 1987, which helped usher in a new era for feminist movements in Taiwan. Currently, Lee Yuan-Chen is an emeritus professor at Tamkang University, Department of Chinese literature.

== Married life ==
Lee Yuan-Chen married her husband during the time she taught at Tamkang University. Initially, Lee Yuan-Chen and her husband had reached a consensus that they would function as a modern couple with the implication of having an egalitarian relationship. However, that consensus was eroded after the birth of their first daughter, as Lee Yuan-Chen's husband demanded her to live with his parents. Lee Yuan-Chen felt forced into a lifestyle that was contradictory to her beliefs and divorced her husband in 1973. Due to the law of the Republic of China at that period of time, custody of her child was granted to the husband. Lee Yuan-Chen was deeply frustrated with this result.

== The Awakening Period ==
Discontent with the patriarchal structure embedded in Taiwan's democratic movement around 1970s, motivated by Annette Lu, and provoked by her own marriage experience, Lee Yuan-Chen was determined to awaken female consciousness in Taiwan. Partnering up with other Taiwanese feminists, Lee Yuan-Chen led the effort of founding the very first magazine concentrating on highlighting female issues in Taiwan, the Awakening Magazine. As the leader of the Awakening group, Lee Yuan-Chen and other like-minded members not only focused on the publication, but also devoted themselves to initiating a series of public activities for the purpose of raising Taiwanese society's awareness on feminist issues. Amid the financial challenges that loomed over the Awakening magazine around 1980s, Lee Yuan-Chen, along with other members of the Awakening group, made the decision of transforming the Awakening magazine into a nonprofit organization that would be more adept at attracting founding and therefore permit the group to continue pushing forward feminist movements in Taiwan. In the year of 1987, the Awakening Foundation was established.

== Feminist Movement vis-à-vis Mass Media in Taiwan ==
Lee Yuan-Chen is convinced that holding mass demonstrations on the streets cannot sufficiently gain more attention for feminist movements in Taiwan's mass media. She contends that feminist organizations in Taiwan must expand both in terms of the number of branches and memberships, especially at the grassroots level, in order to increase the awareness of Taiwan's mass media of the importance of feminist issues.

== Critique of Lee Yuan-Chen ==
The Awakening Foundation was criticized for being incapable of communicating with women at the grassroots level, due to the fact that most of the members of the Awakening group, including Lee Yuan-Chen herself, were from middle or upper-middle classes.

== Lee Yuan-Chen's Critique of Tsai Ing-Wen's Administration ==
In 2016, Taiwan elected its very first female president, Tsai Ing-Wen. However, it did not lead to the increase of female cabinet members in the Tsai administration. Instead, there were only 4 female politicians in a cabinet consisted of 40 members. As a result, Lee Yuan-Chen declined an invitation sent by President Tsai to the state banquet in 2016 to protest the gender inequality in President Tsai's cabinet.
