= Joanne Sandler =

Gender equality advocate

Joanne Sandler is an international gender equality policy adviser, academic and broadcaster. She is Honorary Professor in Gender Equality and Policy at King's College London. She served as Deputy Executive Director of the United Nations Development Fund for Women (UNIFEM) from 2001 to 2010.

== Career ==
Sandler held senior leadership roles at UNIFEM, including Deputy Executive Director for programmes, and served for a period as Acting Executive Director. UNIFEM was the principal United Nations entity dedicated to women's rights prior to the creation of the United Nations Entity for Gender Equality and the Empowerment of Women (UN Women), which became operational in 2011.

Following the adoption of United Nations Security Council Resolution 1325 on women, peace and security, Sandler oversaw an independent expert assessment examining the impact of armed conflict on women and their participation in peace processes. Sandler has been quoted as a commentator on UN Women and international women's rights policy in UN-focused journalism.

=== Scholarly discussion ===
Sandler has been discussed in scholarship on feminist bureaucrats and feminist practice inside international organisations. Rosalind Eyben quotes and cites Sandler in a chapter analysing organisational power, hierarchy and gender equality work in the United Nations system.

Sandler is also referenced in academic research examining feminist practice in international bureaucracies, and in peer-reviewed journal literature analysing the role of "femocrats" within international institutions.

Sandler is listed as a contributor in The Oxford Handbook of Transnational Feminist Movements, an academic reference work published by Oxford University Press.

== Selected works ==
- Sandler, Joanne, and Anne Marie Goetz. 2020. "Can the United Nations deliver a feminist future?" Gender & Development 28 (2).
