= Positive action =

Promotion of an under-represented group

Positive action consists of measures which are targeted at protected groups in order to enable or encourage members of those groups to overcome or minimise disadvantage; or to meet the different needs of the protected group; or to enable or encourage persons in protected groups to participate in an activity. In contrast to affirmative action, there is no element of compulsion in positive action.

In the United Kingdom in the Equality Act 2010 ss. 158-159, the term is used in the context of employment to allow selection of a candidate from an "under-represented" group, so long as he or she is no less than equally qualified compared to another potential candidate that is not from the under-represented group.

== European law ==
- Treaty on the Functioning of the European Union Article 157(4)
- Kalanke v Freie Hansestadt Bremen [1995] IRLR 660, [1996] ECR I-03051 (C-450/93)
- Marschall v Land Nordrhein Westfalen [1997] ECR I-06363 (C-409/95)
- Re Badeck’s application [2001] 2 CMLR 6 (C-158/97)
- Abrahamsson and Anderson v Fogelqvist [2000] ECR I-05539 (C-407/98)

== See also ==
- Affirmative action
- EU law
- UK employment discrimination law
- Equal Opportunity
- Social equality
