= Foundation of Women's Rights Promotion and Development =

Foundation of Women's Rights Promotion and Development (FWRPD; Chinese: 婦女權益促進發展基金會), a center of information and resource for all women in Taiwan, "dedicated to the enhancement and development of women's rights", is funded and established by Taiwanese government. FWRPD is the most important non-profit organization promoting gender mainstreaming in Taiwan.

FWRPD has conducted research on gender mainstreaming and gender equality development, produced gender resources kits for training and education, networked women groups and entrepreneurs, participated in international exchange in UN, APEC gender related meetings.

== Gender impact assessment ==
FWRPD has contributed to the development and execution of Gender Impact Assessment (GIA) in Taiwan. Along with Taiwan's Women's Rights Committee, FWRPD led a series of discussions to draft and implement Taiwan's Gender impact assessment, at the beginning of Taiwan's history of gender impact assessment.

FWRPD has held four gender analysis and impact assessment training workshops in 2008 so as to prepare frontline bureaucrats to implement gender impact assessment.
