= Yenlin Ku =

- Born: 1948 (age 77–78); Taiwan
- Other name: Yenling Ku

Academic background
- Education: National Taiwan University (BA); Claremont Graduate University (MA); Indiana University Bloomington (EdS)

Academic work
- Main interests: Feminism

Yenlin Ku (Chinese: 顧燕翎; born 1948) (sometimes spelled Yenling Ku) is a prominent feminist involved in the women's movement in Taiwan.

== Education ==
Ku has a Bachelor of Arts from National Taiwan University, an Master of Arts from the Claremont Graduate University and an Ed.S. from Indiana University Bloomington.

== Career ==
She is a teacher at the Graduate Institute for Gender Studies and an adviser to Taipei City Government. Many of her experiences and observations are collected in her blog "feminist-original".

Ku has been active in the movement since the mid-1970s. In 1982 Ku and a group of colleagues who supported gender equality established the magazine Awakening to encourage women's self-awareness and to raise public concern about women's issues. This project was followed in 1987 by the Awakening Foundation with the intention of mobilizing more women, improving their social conditions and striving for their rights. After returning from the 1985 Nairobi conference, Ku and other women's studies scholars formed the Women's Research Program at National Taiwan University. She served as chair of the Awakening Foundation from 1997 to 1998 and became the first femocrat in Taiwan in the end of 1998.

== Selected works ==
- Ku, Yenlin (1988). "The changing status of women in Taiwan: A conscious and collective struggle toward equality". Women's Studies International Forum. 11 (3): 179–186. doi:10.1016/0277-5395(88)90133-1.
- Ku, Yenlin (January–March 1989). "The feminist movement in Taiwan, 1972-87". Bulletin of Concerned Asian Scholars. 21 (1). Committee of Concerned Asian Scholars. Archived from the original on 2015-12-08.
- Ku, Yenlin (1996), "Selling a feminist agenda on a conservative market: The awakening experience in Taiwan", in Bell, Diane; Klein, Renate (eds.), Radically speaking: feminism reclaimed, North Melbourne, Victoria: Spinifex Press, pp. 423–428, ISBN 9781875559381.
- Ku, Yenlin (May–June 2008). "Feminist activism within bureaucracy: Process of formulating and implementing regulations governing the protection of women's rights in Taipei". Women's Studies International Forum. 31 (3): 176–185. doi:10.1016/j.wsif.2008.04.004.
