= National Alliance of Taiwan Women's Associations =

The National Alliance of Taiwan Women's Associations (NATWA) (Chinese: 臺灣婦女團體全國聯合會) is the only umbrella group for organizations promoting women's interests across the island of Taiwan. The Alliance is both a Non-governmental organization and a Non-profit organization. Founded in 2001, the alliance consists of 67 member groups. The alliance was created to more efficiently coordinate the distribution of resources among different organizations operating under different circumstances. It regularly publishes educational material, holds conferences and workshops, and participates in movements that advance the rights and interests of Taiwan's women.

== Goals ==
The goals of NATWA are manifold and include the following:
1. Promoting awareness of women's rights issues in Taiwan
2. Publicizing the content of UN treaties that specifically address women's issues
3. Decreasing the disparities between women in rural and urban areas
4. Collaborating with other women's organizations to promote women's interests
5. Monitoring government policy related to women's issues

== Activities ==
=== Lobbying ===
In 2002, NATWA, along with representatives from other women's groups, began lobbying legislators in both the Kuomintang and Democratic Progressive Party to set up an independent gender agency in the central government. They held a series of panel discussions and public hearings, eventually convincing the executive branch to include a special gender agency under the Organizational Reform Plan in 2005. Currently, the plan is still pending approval by the Legislative Yuan.

=== Government collaboration ===
Since 2002, the Ministry of the Interior has invited NATWA to represent women's NGOs in collaborating with other NGOs to evaluate local governments’ executions of the Women's Welfare Policy and Budget. Representatives work with the Ministry of the Interior, touring the island every July to make inspections. They not only supervise policy execution, but also provide advice to local and central governments alike.

NATWA works with 10 other women's groups to form an alliance, the Women on Women's Budget Alliance, which supervises the central government's inclusion of gender mainstreaming in the annual budget on women's affairs.

The Commission of Women's Rights Promotion and Development (WRPD) heeded the Alliance's advice and included the Alliance in its 2003 annual plan. Ever since, every February, each department of the central government has had to submit a report on how their budget meets the needs of women to WRPD for commissioners and women's NGOs to evaluate.

=== International collaboration ===
==== APEC ====
In 2002, NATWA's then-president Dagmar Yu was a representative of Taiwan at WLN (Women's Leaders Network), part of the annual APEC summits. Her speech was called “Best Practice, financial support to the women micro entrepreneur—experience from Taiwan.”

==== United Nations Commission on the Status of Women (UN NGO CSW) ====
NATWA first participated in the UN NGO CSW conference in 2004.

In 2005, NATWA joined 16 women representatives to participate in the UN 49th. NGOCSW, 2005

In 2006, NATWA helped coordinate the participation of Taiwanese women's organizations in the 50th UN NGO CSW conference in 2006.

In 2007, NATWA presented a paper at the 51st UN NGO CSW conference on the status of gender equity education in Taiwan.

==== Convention on the Elimination of All Forms of Discrimination Against Women (CEDAW) ====
Starting in 2004, NATWA held annual conventions on the contents of CEDAW and the importance of its ratification in Taiwan's Legislative Yuan. This eventually resulted in the Legislative Yuan ratifying CEDAW's stipulations in 2007. Taiwan's participation in CEDAW is still pending international approval from the United Nations.

NATWA works with other women's groups to advocate the practice and the signing of CEDAW in Taiwan.

=== Educational programs and conventions ===
In December 2002, NATWA toured 14 counties island-wide to educate local government officials on the Violence in Family Prevention and Sexual Assault Prevention Laws, seeking the practice of these laws on the local level.

In 2003, NATWA held conventions on National Women's Rights in both Taipei and Kaohsiung, evaluating the outcome of the women's rights commission in both central and local governments.

In 2003, NATWA also hosted a program to encourage women's participation in public affairs.

In accordance with gender mainstreaming theories, NATWA held a convention on The Evaluation of Social Welfare—from a Women's and Gendered Perspective on Dec. 12, 2003. At this convention, experts and scholars examined current social welfare policy and laws from a gendered perspective.

From 2002-2004, NATWA instituted the “Ms. Science Training Program,” which encouraged gender-neutral educational planning. NATWA brought outstanding women scientists to speak at female high schools, encouraging young women to cross the gender divide in science-related occupations.
